= Black players in ice hockey =

History of Black people in ice hockey

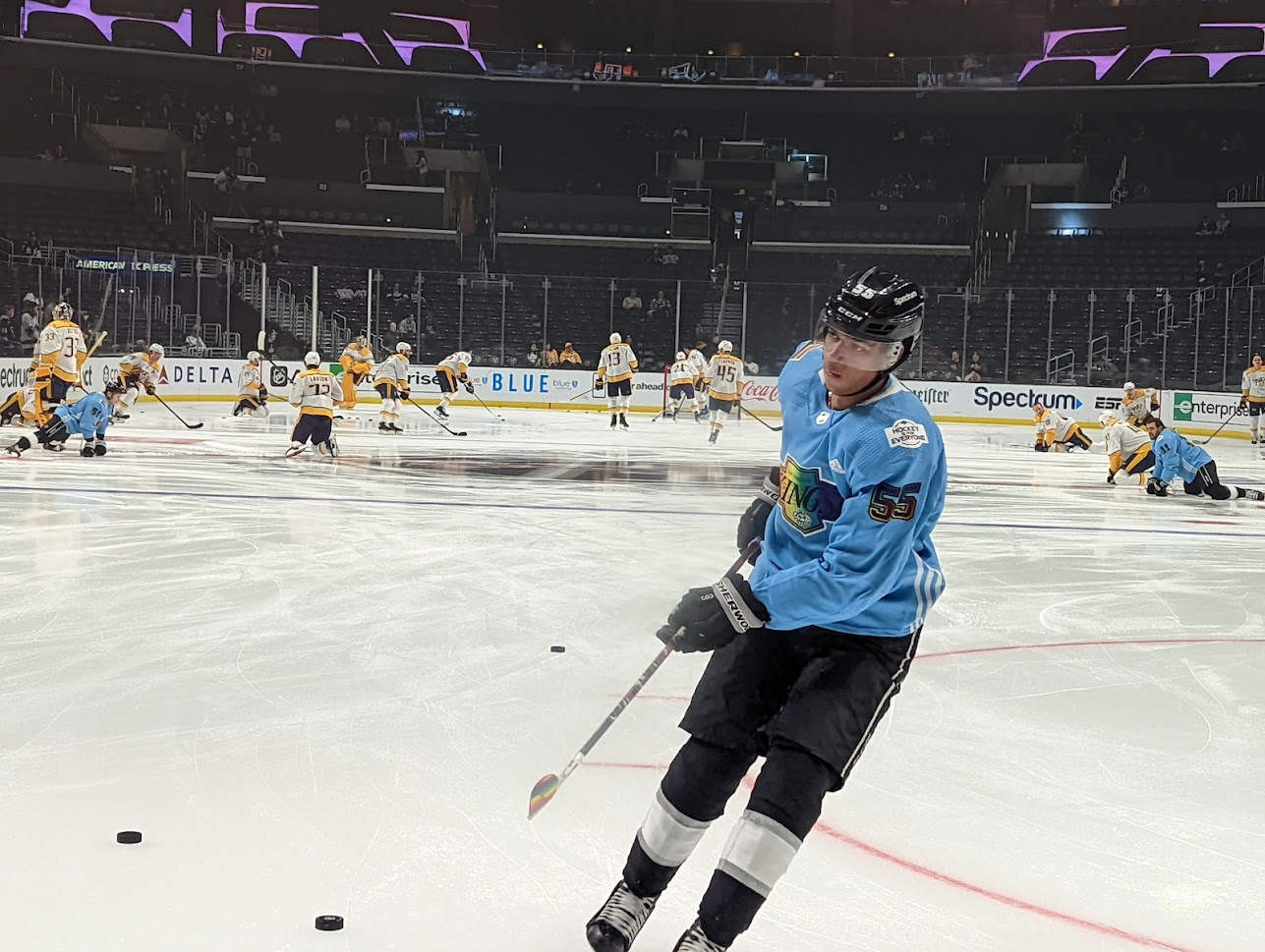
Quinton Byfield during warmups on Los Angeles Kings Pride night, 2022

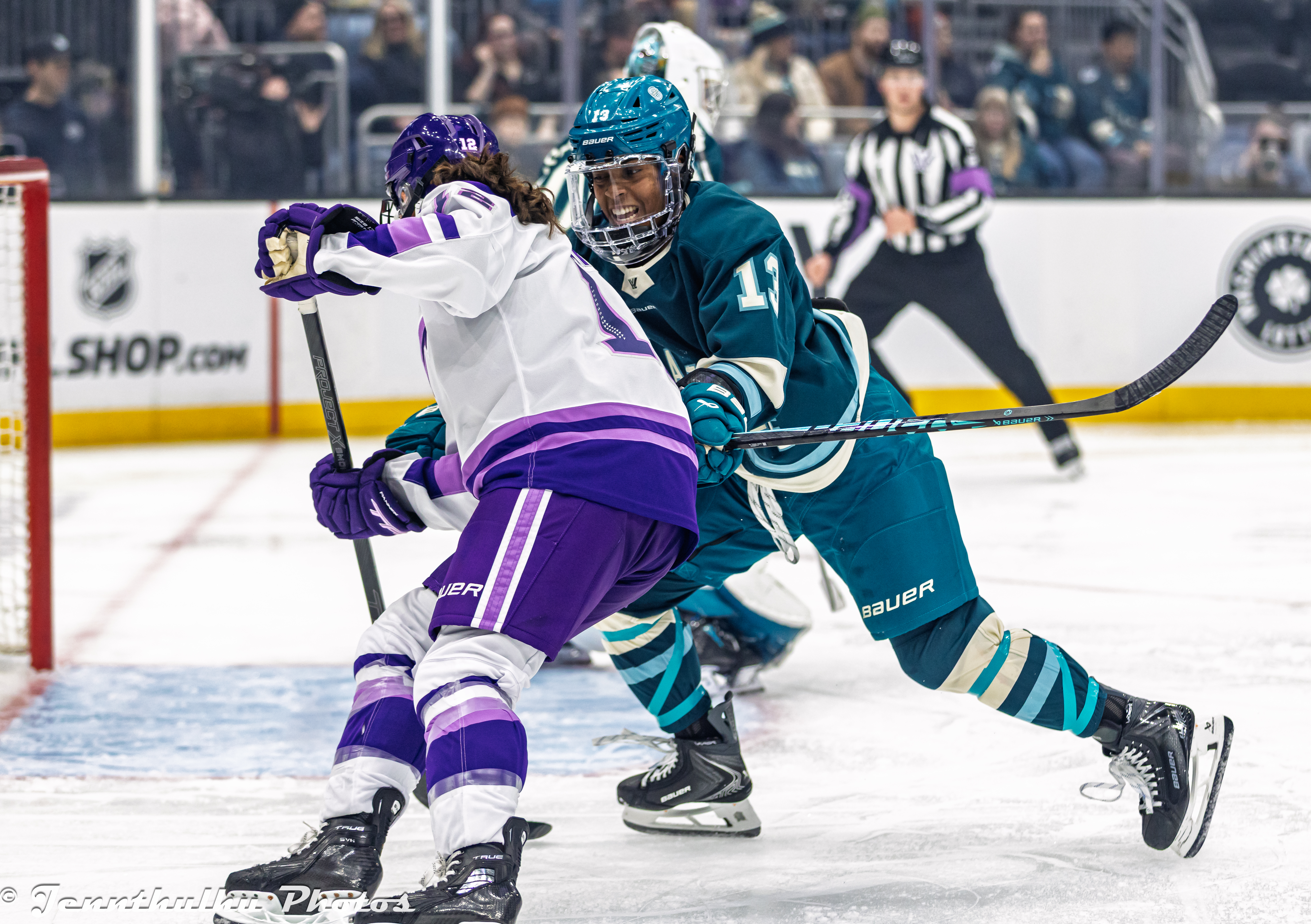
Mikyla Grant-Mentis (right) during a game with the Seattle Torrent against the Minnesota Frost, November 2025

The history of black players in ice hockey has roots dating back to the late 19th century in North America. The first black ice hockey star was Herb Carnegie, who rose to stardom during the Great Depression. In the National Hockey League, Willie O'Ree broke the color barrier with the Boston Bruins in 1958. (Note: "China Clipper" Larry Kwong broke the NHL's color barrier a decade earlier than Willie O'Ree, on March 13, 1948, playing with the New York Rangers against the Montreal Canadiens at the Montreal Forum.) Angela James broke many records. She became the captain of the Canada women's national ice hockey team in 1990 and remains the only Black captain of a national Canadian ice hockey team, men's or women's.

Over the decades, both men's and women's ice hockey have gradually seen an increase in the number of Black players, and the number of historic firsts has grown. However, Black people continue to be underrepresented in ice hockey among players and staff. Black people have traditionally faced racism across leagues in the United States and Canada. Efforts to combat racism within the sport and grow ice hockey among Black players have taken the form of player protests, formal organizations, and league initiatives.

== Men's ice hockey ==
=== Late 19th century and early 20th century ===
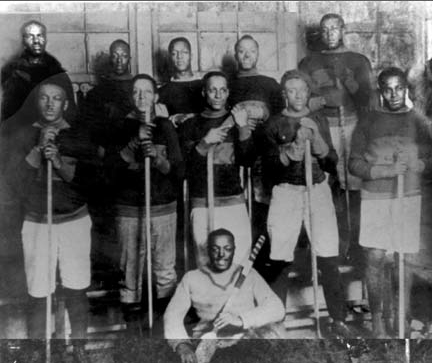
Africville Sea-Sides of the Colored Hockey League, c. 1921

The Colored Hockey League of the Maritimes began in 1895, as an initiative of black Baptist churches in Nova Scotia. The aim was to increase and retain male membership. The league consisted of teams from Halifax, Africville, Hammond's Plains, Dartmouth, Truro, Amherst, and Charlottetown, P.E.I. All games were on an invitational basis with the trophy still residing in a private home in Halifax, Nova Scotia. Historically, they were the first league to allow the goaltender to drop to the ice to stop the puck. The league operated for several decades lasting until 1930.

Ontario is geographically large, and it was impossible in the early 20th century to organize an all-black league like in Nova Scotia. Some of the early black players in Ontario ice hockey history included Hipple Galloway and Fred Kelly. Galloway played as a member of the Woodstock team in the Central Ontario Hockey Association in 1899. In 1916, Fred (Bud) Kelly of London played for the 118 Battalion team of the Ontario Hockey League. Kelly was scouted by the Toronto St. Pats but was never officially contacted. One of the first all-black teams in Ontario was the Orioles. The team was from St. Catharines and played in the Niagara District Hockey League during the 1930s.

=== 1930s to 50s ===
Herb Carnegie's career began in 1938 with the Toronto Young Rangers and continued in the early 1940s with the Buffalo Ankerites, a team in a mines league that played in mining towns in northern Ontario and Quebec. While with the Ankerites, Carnegie was part of the Black Aces line. The other line members consisted of his brother, Ossie Carnegie, and Manny McIntyre, originally from Fredericton, New Brunswick. (Herb was at center, Ossie was right wing, and McIntyre was the left wing.) They were recognized as much for their talent and skill as their skin color. In the semi-professional Quebec Provincial League, Herb was named most valuable player in 1946, 1947, and 1948.

In 1948, Carnegie was given a tryout with the New York Rangers and offered a contract to play in the Rangers' minor league system. However, he was offered less money than he was earning in the Quebec league and turned down all three offers made by the Rangers organization during his tryout.

In August 1950, Canadian centre Art Dorrington became the first Black player to sign an NHL contract (though not with an NHL team directly), signing with a minor league team affiliated with the New York Rangers organization. However, Dorrington only played with minor league teams, including the Atlantic City Seagulls, the New Haven Tomahawks, and the Washington Lions, and was never called up to play a game with the Rangers. Dorrington played professional hockey from 1949 to 1958.

In 1955, John Utendale became the first Black player to sign a contract directly with an NHL team, the Detroit Red Wings. Utendale practiced with the Red Wings but never played in an NHL game; instead he played with the Red Wings' minor league affiliate, the Edmonton Flyers. During the 1958–59 season, Utendale played with the Quebec Aces with fellow Black players Willie O'Ree and Stan Maxwell on "The Black Line"; O'Ree would go on to be the first Black player to actually play in an NHL game. In 2006, Utendale's brother claimed that Jack Adams, the Red Wings' coach and general manager at the time, refused to give Utendale any playing time because Adams objected to his relationship with a white woman whom Utendale later married.

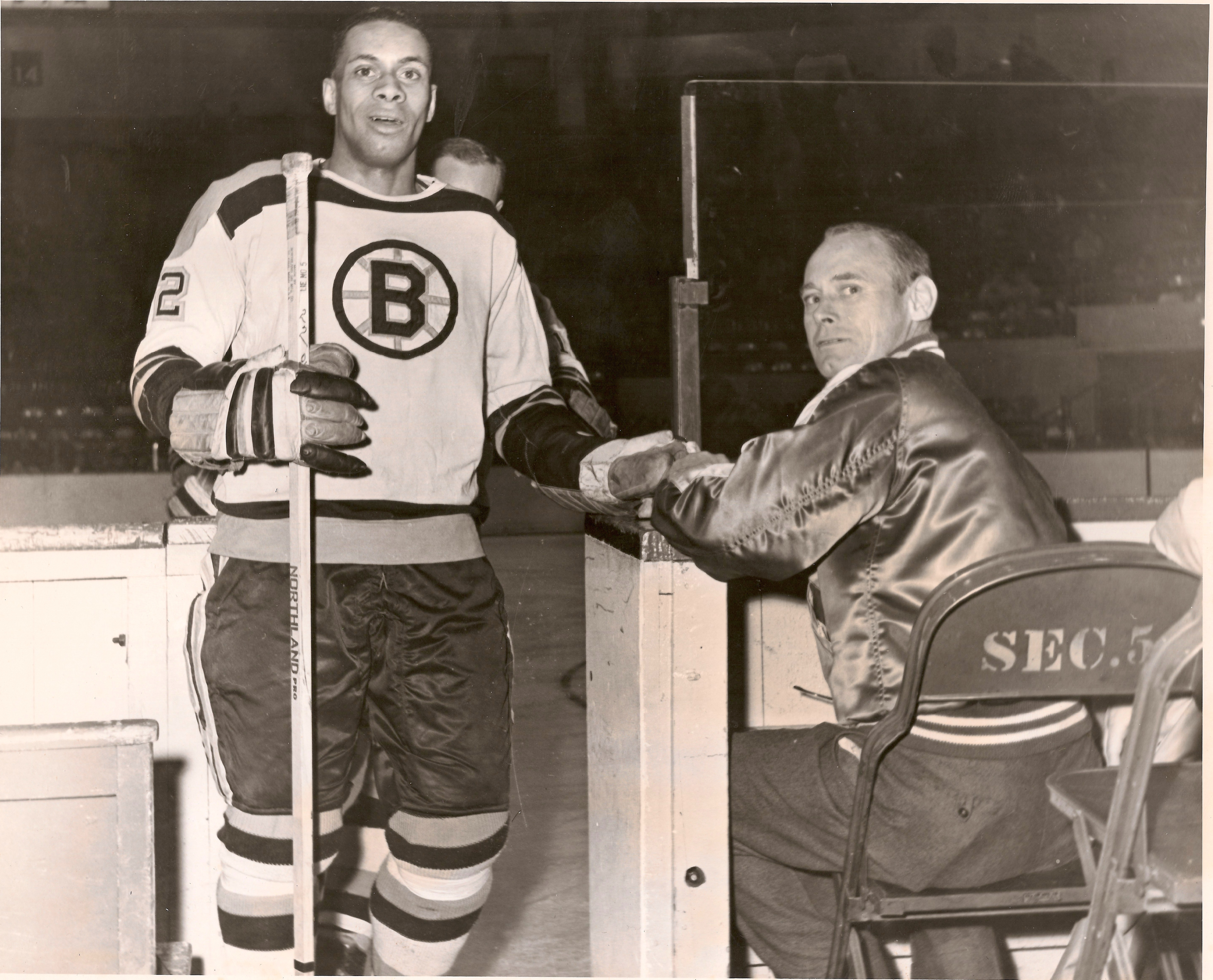
Willie O'Ree of the Boston Bruins and Detroit Red Wings trainer Len "Johny" Fletcher, 1961

Willie O'Ree is referred to as the "Jackie Robinson of ice hockey" (and twice met Robinson personally, in O'Ree's own younger years) as the first black player in the National Hockey League (NHL). He was called up to the Boston Bruins of the NHL to replace an injured player. He made his NHL debut with the Bruins on January 18 of the 1957–58 NHL season, against the Montreal Canadiens, becoming the first black player in league history. O'Ree is still heavily involved with the NHL, in promoting the league's Diversity Program all over North America with amateur youth and adult ice hockey players.

=== 1960s to 80s ===
Alton White was active from 1965 through 1975 in the World Hockey Association (WHA). He played for the New York Raiders, Los Angeles Sharks, Michigan Stags, and Baltimore Blades. White is best known for being the second player of African descent, after Willie O'Ree, to have played on a professional major league ice hockey team. In addition, White is the first player of African descent to score 20 goals in a single season. He did this for the Los Angeles Sharks during the 1972–73 season. During the same 1972–73 season, he became the first black player in history to score a hat trick in a major league professional game.

Mike Marson was active from 1974 to 1981 as a Black Canadian left winger. He was drafted in the second round, 19th overall by the Washington Capitals in the 1974 NHL entry draft, making him the first black player to be drafted in an NHL entry draft (first introduced in 1963). He became the second Black Canadian to play in the NHL. He played five seasons in the NHL for the Washington Capitals and the Los Angeles Kings. While playing for the Capitals, Marson and Bill Riley (the third black player in the NHL) became the first two black players to play in an NHL game together.

Tony McKegney is a Black Canadian who was active from 1978 to 1991. He was adopted and raised by a white family in Sarnia, Ontario. At age twenty, Tony McKegney signed a contract with the WHA's Birmingham Bulls, only to see the owner illegally renege on the deal after fans threatened to boycott the team for having added a black player to its roster. He was drafted by the Buffalo Sabres 32nd overall in 1979. He played in the NHL for the Buffalo Sabres, Quebec Nordiques, Minnesota North Stars, New York Rangers, St. Louis Blues, Detroit Red Wings, and Chicago Blackhawks from 1979 to 1991. He was the first black player to score 40 goals in a season during the 1987–88 season. He played 912 regular season games, scoring 320 career goals with 319 assists. His total of 78 points in the same season was the highest recorded by a black player until Jarome Iginla broke the record in 2001–02.

Val James was active from 1978 to 1988 as an African American defenceman. He was the first American-born African American to play in the NHL, debuting with the Buffalo Sabres during the 1981–82 season. However, James was not the first African American player to be trained exclusively in the United States, as he played in the Canadian Major Junior Hockey League.

=== 1980s to 1990s ===
Dirk Graham was active from 1979 to 1995 as a black Canadian right winger. He was the first black player to be named team captain, captaining the Chicago Blackhawks from 1989 to 1995. Graham was also the first black player to be awarded Selke Trophy for the best defensive forward in 1990–91 as well as the first black head coach, coaching the Blackhawks during the 1998–99 season.

Grant Fuhr was active from 1981 to 2000 as a Black Canadian goaltender. Making his NHL debut in the 1981–82 season, he was the first black goaltender in the NHL and later became the first black player to win the Stanley Cup in 1984. Shortly after his retirement, in 2003, he became the first black player to be inducted into the Hockey Hall of Fame.

Ray Neufeld was active from 1979 to 1990. He played for the Hartford Whalers, Winnipeg Jets and the Boston Bruins.

Claude Vilgrain was active from 1988 to 2002 as a Haitian-born Canadian player. He played 89 NHL games with the Vancouver Canucks, New Jersey Devils, and Philadelphia Flyers. He played in the 1988 Olympics for Team Canada. He was raised in Quebec City, Quebec.

=== 1990s to 2020s ===
Anson Carter was active from 1996 to 2008. On May 11, 2003, he scored on Mikael Tellqvist of Sweden men's national team to lead Canada men's national team to the gold medal at the 2003 IIHF World Championship.

Graeme Townshend was active from 1989 to 1994. He was the first Jamaican born NHL player. His family moved to Toronto Canada in 1969.

Mike Grier was active from 1996 to 2011 as an African American right winger. Born in Detroit, Michigan, he became the first African American player born and trained in the United States to play in the NHL, after making his NHL debut during the 1996–97 season. He later became the first black general manager in the NHL, after being hired by the San Jose Sharks before the 2022–23 season.

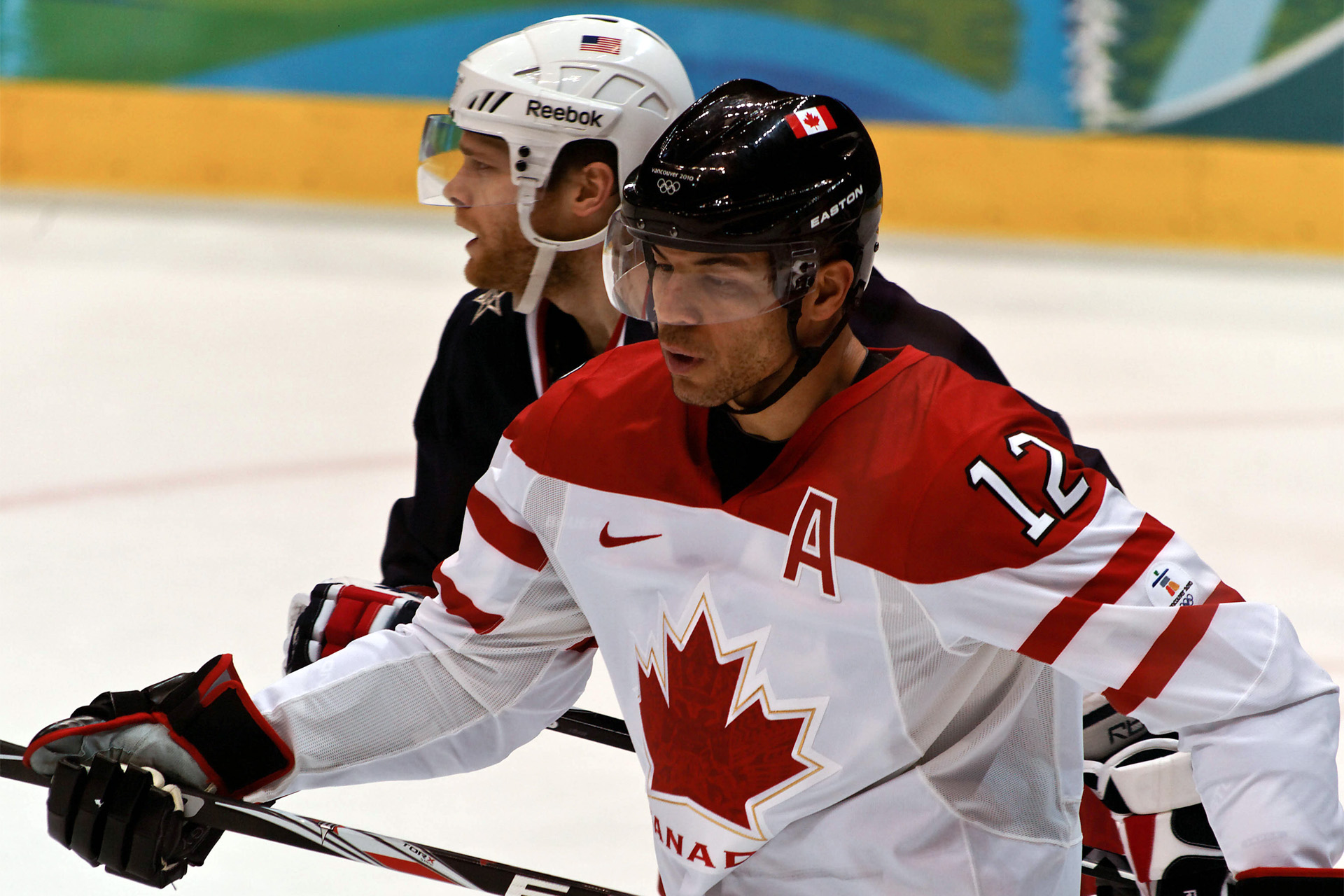
Jarome Iginla won gold medals for Canada at the Olympics in 2002 and 2010

Jarome Iginla was active from 1996 to 2017 as a black Canadian right winger. He is the Calgary Flames' all-time leader in goals, points, and games played. Iginla is the first black NHL player to win the Art Ross Trophy (leading point scorer) and the first to win the Maurice "Rocket" Richard Trophy (leading goal scorer), both in 2002. As a member of the Canadian men's national team in the 2002 Winter Olympics, he became the first black man to win any gold medal at the Winter Olympics.

Johnny Oduya was active from 1999 to 2018. He is an African Swedish defenceman, whose father was a Luo from Kenya. He became the first European-trained player of African descent to play in the NHL, after making his NHL debut during the 2006–07 season.

Wayne Simmonds was active from 2008 to 2023 as a black Canadian right winger. He was the first black player to be awarded the NHL All-Star Game MVP in 2017.

P. K. Subban was active from 2009 to 2022 as a Black Canadian defenceman. His father immigrated to Canada from Jamaica. He was the first black player to win the award for the NHL's best defenceman, the James Norris Memorial Trophy in 2013.

=== Anti-Black racial incidents in the NHL ===
Black players in the National Hockey League (NHL) have faced racism and discrimination throughout their careers from the league and fans. They continue to face racism today. The NHL has taken various approaches to address this problem.

=== Current players ===
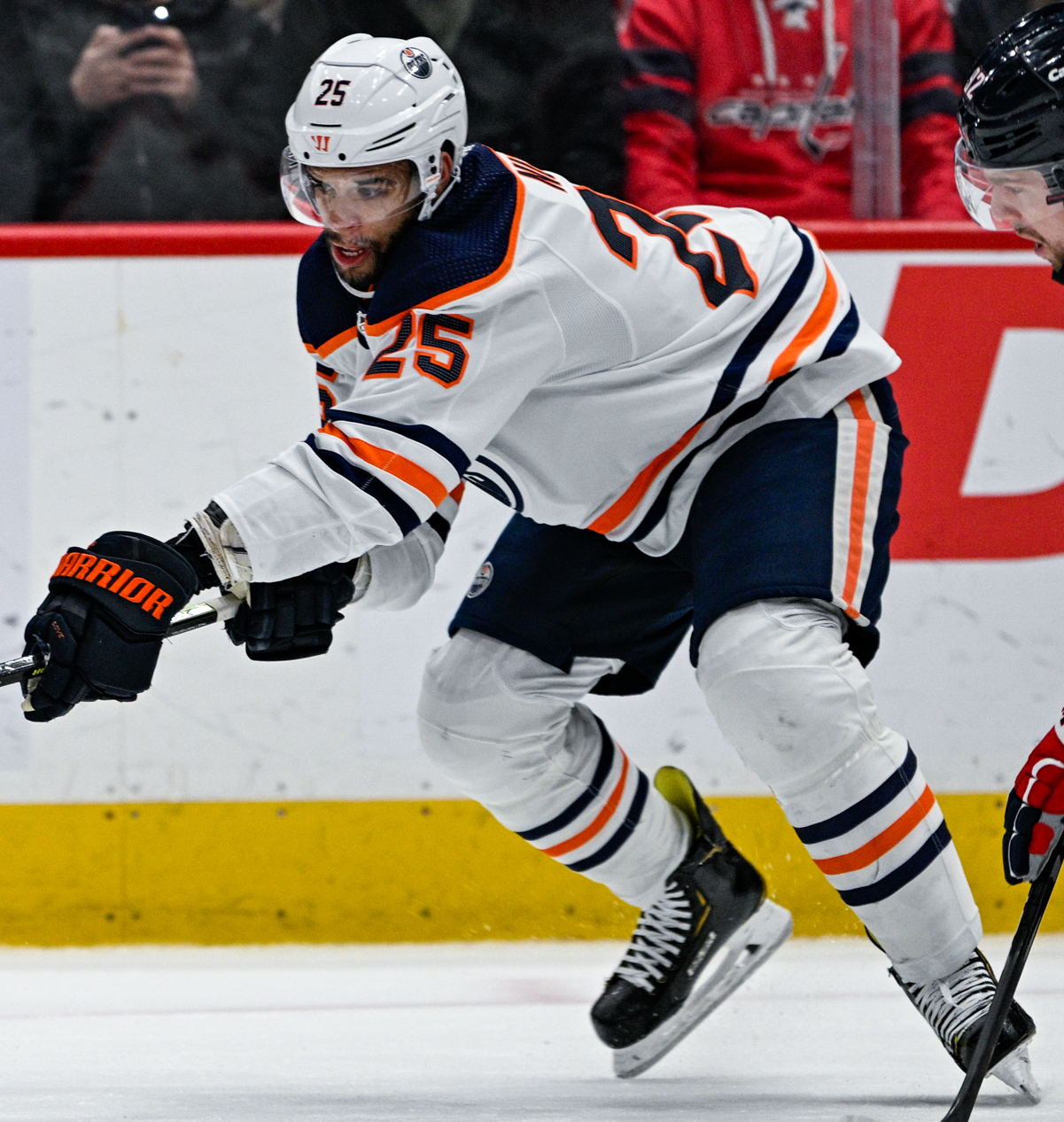
Darnell Nurse with the Edmonton Oilers, 2022

In the 2025–26 NHL season, there were between 23 and 26 active black players in the NHL.

Darnell Nurse is a Canadian professional defenceman for the NHL. Nurse was selected by the Edmonton Oilers seventh overall in the 2013 NHL entry draft. He played for the Oilers until he was traded to the San Jose Sharks in 2026. Internationally, he won gold with the Canada junior team at the 2015 World Junior Championships and was named one of Canada's top three players, as well as the player of the match for the gold medal game against Russia. He won silver with Team Canada in the 2019 World Championship. Nurse has competed with Team Canada several other times.

Jet Greaves is a goaltender for the Columbus Blue Jackets. He made his NHL debut on April 4, 2023, as an undrafted player and set the record for most saves by a Columbus goaltender in their debut match. His 46 save performance was the fifth most in an NHL debut since the 1955–56 NHL season. Greaves was named to Team Canada for the 2026 World Championship, where he played with Nurse. Out of eight total games for Canada, he was the goaltender for six, one of which was a shutout. He had a 1.88 goals-against average and a .920 save percentage.

Quinton Byfield set a record for being the highest-ever selected black player in the NHL entry draft when he was picked by the Los Angeles Kings at second overall in the 2020 NHL entry draft. The Kings signed Byfield to a three-year, entry-level contract on October 16, 2020. He was assigned to the Kings' American Hockey League (AHL) roster to begin the 2020–21 season where he played on a line with Akil Thomas and Devante Smith-Pelly. His line became the first all-Black line in professional ice hockey since Herb Carnegie, Ossie Carnegie, and Manny McIntyre in the 1940s. During their first game together, Thomas recorded a natural hat-trick and his line combined for six points in the eventual win. On April 28, 2021, Byfield made his NHL debut in a 3–2 loss to the Anaheim Ducks.

== Women's ice hockey ==
=== History ===
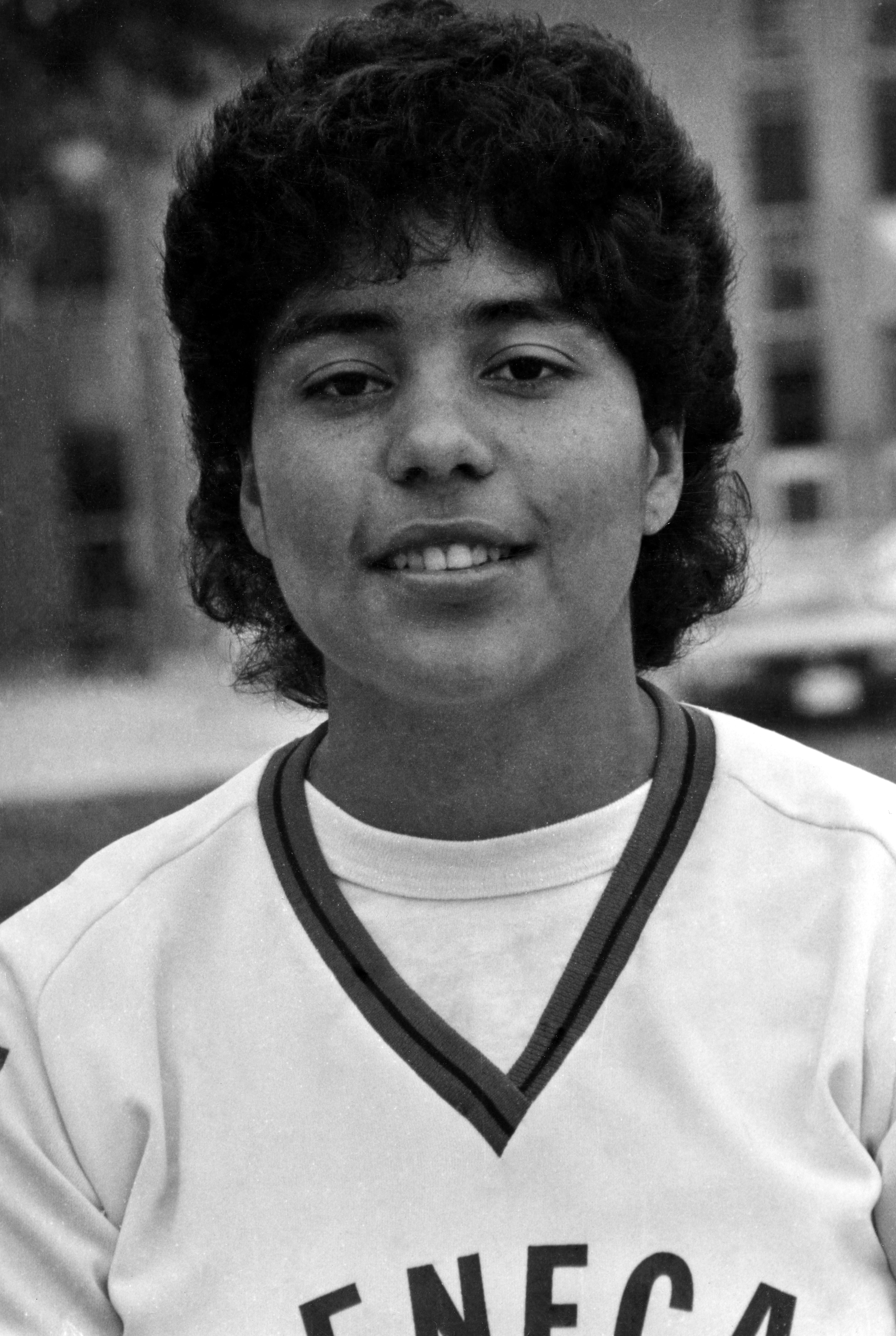
Angela James at Seneca College, c. 1983

Angela James played in the Central Ontario Women's Hockey League, precursor to the National Women's Hockey League and Canadian Women's Hockey League. She represented Canada women's national team internationally and was the team captain in the inaugural World Women's Championship in 1990. She has been called "the Wayne Gretzky of women's hockey" and remains the only Black Canadian to captain a national team.

James scored 34 points (22 goals, 12 assists) in 20 games over four Women's World Championships, including 11 goals in five games in the 1990 IIHF Women's World Championship tournament, a record that still stands today. James has won four world championship gold medals, two 3 Nations Cup gold medals, and one IIHF Pacific Rim Championship gold medal with Canada women's national team. In 2008, James, Cammi Granato (United States), and Geraldine Heaney (CAN) became the first women to be inducted into the IIHF Hall of Fame. In 2010, she was inducted into the Hockey Hall of Fame, accomplishing several firsts: the first woman (along with Cammi Granato), the first openly gay player, and the first Black woman—only the second Black player, seven years after Grant Fuhr.

=== Current players ===
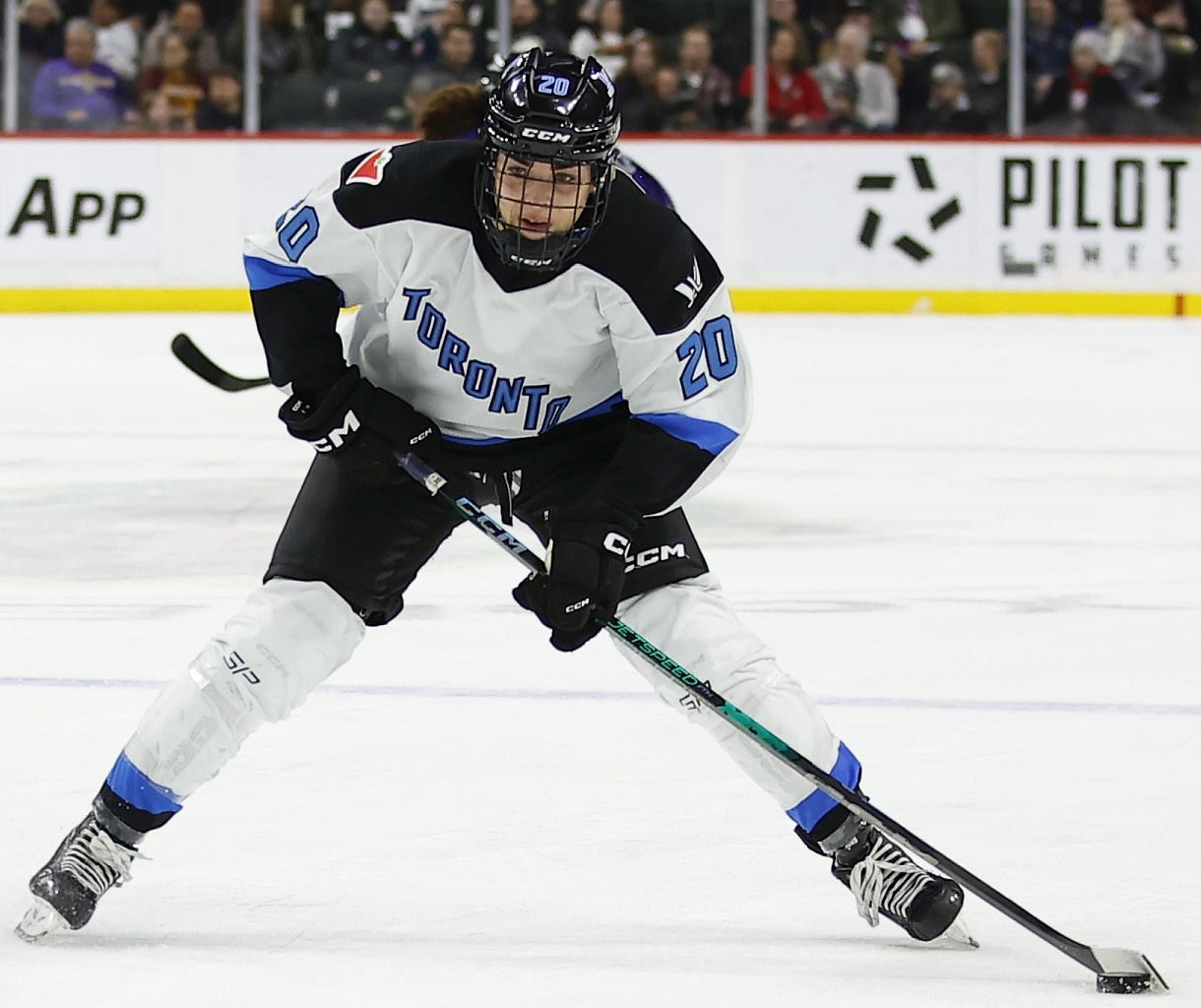
Sarah Nurse playing for the Toronto Sceptres, 2024

Sarah Nurse is a Canadian professional ice hockey player and alternate captain for the Vancouver Goldeneyes of the Professional Women's Hockey League (PWHL) and Canada women's national ice hockey team. She became the first Black woman to win a silver medal in Olympic ice hockey at the 2018 Winter Olympics. She won Olympic gold with Team Canada at the 2022 Winter Olympics, where she broke the single-tournament Olympic point record with 18 and became the first Black woman to win a gold medal in Olympic ice-hockey. She scored the opening goal of the gold medal game against the United States and added an assist on Marie-Philip Poulin's eventual game-winning goal in Canada's 3–2 victory.

Mikyla Grant-Mentis is a Canadian professional ice hockey forward for the Seattle Torrent of the PWHL. She is the all-time leading scorer of the Merrimack Warriors women's ice hockey team and made history in 2021 as the first Black player to win the Most Valuable Player award of the Premier Hockey Federation (PHF), becoming the most decorated player in a single PHF season with a record four accolades.

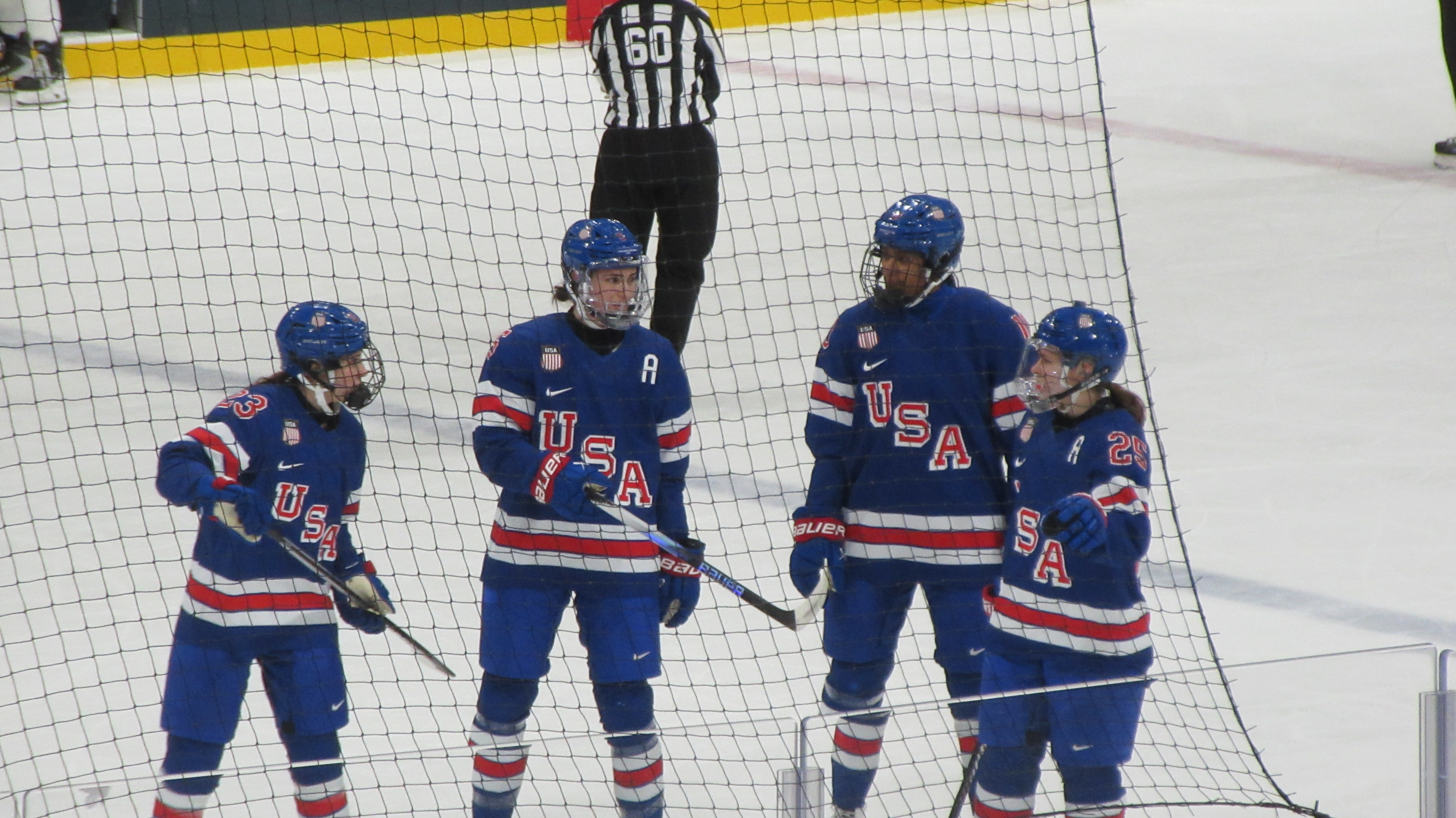
Laila Edwards (center right) with her teammates at the 2026 Winter Olympics

In 2023, Laila Edwards became the first black woman to compete for the United States women's national team. In 2026, she became the first Black woman to play hockey for Team USA at the Olympics. When Team USA won gold in the 2026 Winter Olympics, Edwards became the first Black American woman to win Olympic gold in ice hockey. Following the tournament she was named to the media all-star team.

On June 17, 2026, Edwards was selected fourth overall in the 2026 PWHL Draft, to the San Jose Sea Lions, making her the first entry drafted player in franchise history and the highest-selected black woman in PWHL history.

=== Management ===
Kim Davis was hired in 2017 as the Executive Vice President of Social Impact, Growth Initiatives & Legislative Affairs for the NHL.

Kelsey Koelzer is an American ice hockey defenceman. In 2019, she was hired as head coach of the Arcadia University women's ice hockey program, becoming the first black female head coach in NCAA history. She was formerly the Advisor to the Commissioner on Diversity, Equity, and Inclusion for the National Women's Hockey League (NWHL).

=== Fans ===
The Black Girl Hockey Club was founded in October 2018 by Renee Hess, an assistant director at La Sierra University and Pittsburgh Penguins fan, as an online chat group for black women in ice hockey. Hess previously conducted a study on black women's experiences in the game, the Black Hockey Research Project, noting that many experienced discrimination at games and that there were only three black women playing professional ice hockey in North America at the time. The group quickly grew, and began organising meet-ups at NHL and NWHL games. The first NHL meet-up was held at a Washington Capitals match on December 16, 2018, and was attended by over 40 members, including NWHLer Kelsey Koelzer.

== Career stats ==
=== Franchise career ===
These are the top-ten points, goals, and assists scorers in any franchise history. Figures are updated after each completed NHL regular season.

Note: Pos = Position; GP = Games played; G = Goals; A = Assists; Pts = Points; P/G = Points per game; G/G = Goals per game; A/G = Assists per game; * = Active player; Bold = Current team

Points
| Player | GP | G | A | Pts | P/G | Team |
|---|---|---|---|---|---|---|
| Jarome Iginla (RW) | 1,219 | 525 | 570 | 1,095 | .90 | Calgary Flames |
| Wayne Simmonds (RW) | 584 | 203 | 175 | 378 | .65 | Philadelphia Flyers |
| Kyle Okposo (RW) | 529 | 139 | 230 | 369 | .70 | New York Islanders |
| Dirk Graham (W) | 546 | 172 | 191 | 363 | .66 | Chicago Blackhawks |
| Dustin Byfuglien (D) | 528 | 102 | 261 | 363 | .69 | Winnipeg Jets |
| Darnell Nurse* (D) | 716 | 81 | 219 | 300 | .42 | **Edmonton Oilers** |
| P. K. Subban (D) | 434 | 63 | 215 | 278 | .64 | Montreal Canadiens |
| Tony McKegney (LW) | 363 | 127 | 141 | 268 | .74 | Buffalo Sabres |
| Lucas Raymond* (LW) | 320 | 98 | 156 | 254 | .79 | **Detroit Red Wings** |
| Kyle Okposo (RW) | 516 | 103 | 142 | 245 | .47 | Buffalo Sabres |

Goals
| Player | G | G/G | Team |
|---|---|---|---|
| Jarome Iginla (RW) | 525 | .43 | Calgary Flames |
| Wayne Simmonds (RW) | 203 | .35 | Philadelphia Flyers |
| Dirk Graham (W) | 172 | .32 | Chicago Blackhawks |
| Kyle Okposo (RW) | 139 | .26 | New York Islanders |
| Tony McKegney (LW) | 127 | .35 | Buffalo Sabres |
| Kyle Okposo (RW) | 103 | .20 | Buffalo Sabres |
| Dustin Byfuglien (D) | 102 | .19 | Winnipeg Jets |
| Lucas Raymond* (LW) | 98 | .31 | **Detroit Red Wings** |
| Ray Neufeld (RW) | 95 | .29 | Hartford Whalers |
| Evander Kane* (LW) | 87 | .41 | San Jose Sharks |

Assists
| Player | A | A/G | Team |
|---|---|---|---|
| Jarome Iginla (RW) | 570 | .47 | Calgary Flames |
| Dustin Byfuglien (D) | 261 | .49 | Winnipeg Jets |
| Kyle Okposo (RW) | 230 | .43 | New York Islanders |
| Darnell Nurse* (D) | 219 | .31 | **Edmonton Oilers** |
| P. K. Subban (D) | 215 | .50 | Montreal Canadiens |
| Dirk Graham (W) | 191 | .35 | Chicago Blackhawks |
| Wayne Simmonds (RW) | 175 | .30 | Philadelphia Flyers |
| Seth Jones (D) | 173 | .45 | Columbus Blue Jackets |
| Trevor Daley (D) | 164 | .22 | Dallas Stars |
| Lucas Raymond* (LW) | 156 | .49 | **Detroit Red Wings** |

=== NHL career ===
These are the top-ten points, goals, and assists scorers in NHL history. Figures are updated after each completed NHL regular season.

Note: Pos = Position; GP = Games played; G = Goals; A = Assists; Pts = Points; P/G = Points per game; G/G = Goals per game; A/G = Assists per game; * = Active player

Points
| Player | Pos | GP | G | A | Pts | P/G |
|---|---|---|---|---|---|---|
| Jarome Iginla | RW | 1,554 | 625 | 675 | 1,300 | .84 |
| Tony McKegney | LW | 912 | 320 | 319 | 639 | .70 |
| Evander Kane* | LW | 930 | 326 | 291 | 617 | .66 |
| Kyle Okposo | RW | 1,051 | 242 | 372 | 614 | .58 |
| Wayne Simmonds | RW | 1,037 | 263 | 263 | 526 | .51 |
| Dustin Byfuglien | D | 869 | 177 | 348 | 525 | .60 |
| Dirk Graham | W | 772 | 219 | 270 | 489 | .63 |
| P. K. Subban | D | 834 | 115 | 352 | 467 | .56 |
| Seth Jones* | D | 860 | 99 | 342 | 441 | .51 |
| Anson Carter | RW | 674 | 202 | 212 | 414 | .61 |

Goals
| Player | Pos | G | G/G |
|---|---|---|---|
| Jarome Iginla | RW | 625 | .40 |
| Evander Kane* | LW | 326 | .35 |
| Tony McKegney | LW | 320 | .35 |
| Wayne Simmonds | RW | 263 | .25 |
| Kyle Okposo | RW | 242 | .23 |
| Dirk Graham | W | 219 | .28 |
| Anson Carter | RW | 202 | .30 |
| Dustin Byfuglien | D | 177 | .20 |
| Mike Grier | RW | 162 | .15 |
| Ray Neufeld | RW | 157 | .26 |

Assists
| Player | Pos | A | A/G |
|---|---|---|---|
| Jarome Iginla | RW | 675 | .43 |
| Kyle Okposo | RW | 372 | .35 |
| P. K. Subban | D | 352 | .42 |
| Dustin Byfuglien | D | 348 | .40 |
| Seth Jones* | D | 342 | .40 |
| Tony McKegney | LW | 319 | .35 |
| Evander Kane* | LW | 291 | .31 |
| Dirk Graham | W | 270 | .35 |
| Wayne Simmonds | RW | 263 | .25 |
| Mike Grier | RW | 221 | .21 |

== Historic firsts ==
=== NHL ===
- First black player to sign an NHL contract (with a minor league team in an NHL organization): Art Dorrington (August 1950)
- First black player to sign a contract with an NHL team: John Utendale (1955)
- First black player in an NHL game: Willie O'Ree (January 18, 1958)
- First black goaltender in the NHL: Grant Fuhr (1981–82)
- First black player to win the Stanley Cup: Grant Fuhr (1983–84)
- First black player to win the Frank J. Selke Trophy: Dirk Graham (1990–91)
- First black player to win the William M. Jennings Trophy: Grant Fuhr (1993–94)
- First black player to win the Art Ross Trophy: Jarome Iginla (2002)
- First black player to win the Maurice "Rocket" Richard Trophy: Jarome Iginla (2002)
- First black player to earn 20 shutouts: Grant Fuhr (1996–97)
- First black head coach in the NHL: Dirk Graham (1998–99 Chicago Blackhawks)
- First black player to win the James Norris Memorial Trophy: P. K. Subban (2012–13)
- First Black referee to officiate an NHL game: Jay Sharrers (2001)

=== Goals and points ===
- First black player to surpass 20 goals in a single season: Alton White, Los Angeles Sharks, WHA (1972–73 season)
- First black player to surpass 100 PIM in an NHL season: Bill Riley (1976–77)
- First black player to surpass 20 goals in a single NHL season: Tony McKegney (1979–80)
- First black player to surpass 100 goals in the NHL: Tony McKegney (1982–83)
- First black player to surpass 500 NHL points: Tony McKegney (1987–88)
- First black player to surpass 200 NHL wins: Grant Fuhr (1988–89)
- First black player to surpass 200 PIM in an NHL season: Donald Brashear (1995–96)
- First black player to surpass 1,000 PIM in the NHL: Donald Brashear (1997–98)
- First black player to surpass 400 NHL wins: Grant Fuhr (1999–00)
- First black player to surpass 50 goals in a single NHL season: Jarome Iginla (2001–02)
- First black player to surpass 2,000 PIM in the NHL: Donald Brashear (2005–06)
- First black player to surpass 500 goals in the NHL: Jarome Iginla (2011–12)

=== International play ===
- First Black captain for Canadian national team: Angela James (1990)
- First Black player to win a gold medal at the Winter Olympics: Jarome Iginla (2002)
- First Black woman inducted into the IIHF Hall of Fame: Angela James (2008)
- First Black American goaltender to win a medal (bronze) at World Junior Championship: Kaidan Mbereko (2023)
- First Black woman to compete for the United States women's national ice hockey team: Laila Edwards (2023)
- First Black woman to play hockey for Team USA at the Olympics and first Black American woman to win Olympic gold in ice hockey: Laila Edwards (2026)

=== American-born ===
- First American-born black player in an NHL game: Val James (1981–82)
- First American-born and exclusively American-trained black player in an NHL game: Mike Grier (1996–97)
- First American-born black player to surpass 1,000 PIM in the NHL: Donald Brashear (1997–98)
- First American-born black player to surpass 20 goals in a single NHL season: Mike Grier (1998–99)
- First American-born black goaltender in the NHL: Gerald Coleman (2005–06)
- First American-born black player to play 1,000 NHL Games: Donald Brashear (2009–10)
- First American-born black player to win the Stanley Cup: Dustin Byfuglien (2009–10)

=== Others ===
- First all-Black line in professional ice hockey: Herb Carnegie, Ossie Carnegie, and Manny McIntyre (1940s)
- First black head coach in the NCAA: Ed Wright, Buffalo Bulls (1970–71)
- First black coach in professional ice hockey: John Paris Jr. of Windsor, Nova Scotia, for the Atlanta Knights (1994)
- First time two black players played in the NHL in the same game: Mike Marson and Bill Riley
- First black player in the Hockey Hall of Fame: Grant Fuhr (2003)
- First black TV analyst in ice hockey: Kevin Weekes Weekes provides color commentary for NHL games on the NHL Network and Hockey Night in Canada.
- First all-Black TV broadcast in NHL history: On February 17, 2022, J. T. Brown and Everett Fitzhugh called the Kraken's game against the Winnipeg Jets.

== Black teams, leagues, and organizations ==
- Hockey Diversity Alliance
- HPOC Tournament Team of the Players of Color Movement
- The Fort Dupont Hockey Club in Washington, D.C. is the longest-running hockey club for Black players or any minority in North America.
- The Ice Hockey and Sports Hall of Fame Society runs a Black Youth Ice Hockey (BYIH) program. It also hosts an annual Colored Hockey League of the Maritimes Memorial Game.
- The Panthers were an all-black hockey team that competed in the Minneapolis 2022 AAA Summer Showdown Hockey Tournament.

== In media and popular culture ==
=== Documentaries ===
Damon Kwame Mason has written, directed, or produced several documentaries about Black players in ice hockey:

- Soul on Ice (2016) is about the Colored Hockey League and the history of Black players in ice hockey. It features Herb Carnegie, Val James, and Willie O'Ree.
- The Cannons (2022) follows two Black teenage hockey players who play for the Fort Dupont Cannons in Washington, D.C., and their coach, Neal Henderson.
- Ice Queens (2023) documents the history of Black women in ice hockey and features Angela James, Sarah Nurse, Mikyla Grant-Mentis, Kim Davis, and Kelsey Koelzer.

The NHL produced NHL Bound (2022), which follows two black coaches.

Black Ice (2022) is a documentary about the Colored Hockey League.

=== Fiction ===
Hockey is for Everybody is a semi-autobiographical, illustrated children's book series written by Anthony Charles Walsh about a young Black hockey player who faces racism.

The film Youngblood (2025 film) focuses on a fictional Black hockey player from Detroit who plays in Hamilton, Ontario. It is an adaptation of the 1986 film of the same name.

== See also ==
- African Americans in sports
- History of the National Hockey League
- Race and ethnicity in the NHL
- Race and sports
- List of African-American sports firsts
- List of African American sportspeople
- List of films about ice hockey
