= List of sports desegregation firsts =

This is a list of sports desegregation firsts. Within each section, the entries are in chronological order by achievement.

== Major League Baseball ==
- 1871: Steve Bellán (1849–1932), first Latin American, depending on whether or not the National Association of Professional Base Ball Players is considered a major league
- 1879: William Edward White (1860–1937), believed to be the first African American to play in the major leagues, appearing in one game on June 21, 1879. White passed as white.
- 1884: Moses Fleetwood Walker (1856–1924), first openly African-American player
- 1887: Jim Toy (1858–1919), another possible, disputed candidate for first Native American player
- 1897: Louis Sockalexis (1871–1913), a member of the Penobscot tribe, often considered the first player of Native American ancestry
- 1902: Lou Castro (1876–1941), the first Latin American, if not Bellán
- 1921: Moses Yellowhorse (1898–1964), first full-blooded Native American player, from the Pawnee tribe
- 1947: Jackie Robinson (1919–1972), first African American to play in Major League Baseball in the modern era
- 1947: Larry Doby (1923–2003), second African American to break the color barrier, first in the American League
- 1964: Masanori Murakami (born 1944), first Japanese player

== National Football League ==
Note: NFL.com, the official site of the league, recognizes players of the American Professional Football Association (APFA), which was renamed the National Football League (NFL) in 1921, as members of the NFL.

=== Players ===
- 1920: Fritz Pollard (1894–1986), one of the first two African-American players; also the first (co-)head coach (see below)
- 1920: Bobby Marshall (1880–1958), one of the first two African-American players
- 1927: Lou Molinet (1904–1976), first Hispanic, Cuban and Latin American player
- 1927: Sneeze Achiu (1902–1989), first player of East Asian descent

=== Others ===
- 1921: Fritz Pollard: first (co-)head coach, of the Akron Pros of the APFA
- 1965: Burl Toler (1928–2009), first African-American official
- 1988: Johnny Grier (1947–2022), first African-American referee

== National Basketball Association ==
- 1947: Wat Misaka (1923–2019), first non-white player and first of Asian descent
- 1950: Harold Hunter (1926-2013), first African-American player to sign an NBA contract (with the Washington Capitols) on April 26, 1950. However, he was cut from the team during training camp and did not play professionally.
- 1950: Nat Clifton (1922–1990), Chuck Cooper (1926–1984) and Earl Lloyd (1928–2015) become the first three African-Americans to play in the NBA. Clifton was the second African-American player to sign an NBA contract on May 24, 1950 (with the New York Knicks), but Lloyd was the first to actually play in a game (with the Washington Capitols on October 31, 1950, preceding Cooper (with the Boston Celtics) by one day and Clifton by four days. The order of which player went first was based entirely upon the NBA schedule of that year.
- 1953: Don Barksdale (1923-1993) becomes the first African-American to play in an NBA All-Star Game.

== National Hockey League ==
- 1926: Taffy Abel (1900–1964), first known American-born Indigenous American (Ojibwe) player (with the New York Rangers); however, Abel kept his ethnic background a secret until after he was retired from hockey in the late 1930s
- 1930: Henry Maracle (1904-1958), first known full-blooded First Nations (Mohawk) hockey player in the NHL (with the New York Rangers); unlike Taffy Abel, Maracle's ethnicity was known publicly during his playing career in the 1930s
- 1948: Larry Kwong (1923–2018), first player of Asian descent (Canadian-Chinese) to play in an NHL game (with the New York Rangers)
- 1948: Herb Carnegie (1919-2012), first Black player to play in a professional hockey game, although not the NHL; first Black player to be given a tryout and offered a contract with an NHL team's organization (the New York Rangers), although with an affiliated minor league team and not with the NHL team itself (Carnegie did not sign)
- 1950: Art Dorrington (1930-2017), first Black player to sign a contract with an NHL team's organization (the New York Rangers), although with an affiliated minor league team and not with the NHL team itself
- 1955: John Utendale (1937-2006), first Black player to sign an NHL contract directly with an NHL team (the Detroit Red Wings), although he only played for their minor league team and did not play in an NHL game
- 1958: Willie O'Ree (born 1935), first Black player to play in the NHL (with the Boston Bruins)
- 1991: Bill Guerin (born 1970), first player of Hispanic descent
- 1989: Robin Bawa (born 1966), first player of Indian or South Asian descent

== Boxing ==
- 1890: George Dixon (1870–1908), a Canadian and the first black world champion in any sport
- 1902: Joe Gans (1874–1910), first African-American world champion boxer
- 1907: Jack Johnson (1878–1946), first African-American world heavyweight champion

== Tennis ==
- 1945, 1958: Bob Ryland (1920–2020), first African American to compete in the NCAA National Championships and first professional player
- 1950: Althea Gibson (1927–2003), first African American to play in the United States National Championships (now the US Open) and first to win a Grand Slam title (French Open)
- 1963: Arthur Ashe (1943–1993), first African American selected to the United States Davis Cup team

== Golf ==
- 1896: John Shippen (1879–1968), first African-American to play in the U.S. Open, in 1896, also the first American-born professional golfer
- 1896: Oscar Bunn (1875–1918), first Native American (a Shinnecock Indian) to play in a Major, the same 1898 U.S. Open as his friend Shippen
- 1961: Charlie Sifford (1922–2015), first African American to join the PGA tour
- 1963: Sewsunker Sewgolum (1928–1978), first person of color to win a provincial open in South Africa, the Natal Open
- 1963: Althea Gibson (1927–2003), first African American to join the LPGA tour

== Association football ==
- 1881: Andrew Watson (1856–1921), considered the first black person to play association football at the international level
- 1889: Arthur Wharton (1865–1930), widely considered to be the first black professional footballer in the world

== Rugby union ==
- 1871: James Robertson (c. 1854–1900), Scottish rugby union player reputed to be the first black rugby union player in the world

== Cycling ==
- 1897: Major Taylor (1878–1932), a member of the integrated Boston Pursuit cycling team, first African-American world champion in any sport (1899)
