= Soul on Ice (film) =

- Directed by: Damon Kwame Mason
- Written by: Damon Kwame Mason
- Starring: Herb Carnegie; Val James; Willie O'Ree
- Release date: November 4, 2015
- Running time: 89 minutes
- Country: United States
- Language: English

Soul On Ice: Past, Present, & Future is a 2016 American documentary film directed, produced, and written by Damon Kwame Mason. The film tells the story of the Colored Hockey League and the history of Black players in ice hockey in the United States and Canada.

== Reception ==
The film has gained positive reviews from critics.
