= Larry Kwong =

Canadian ice hockey player

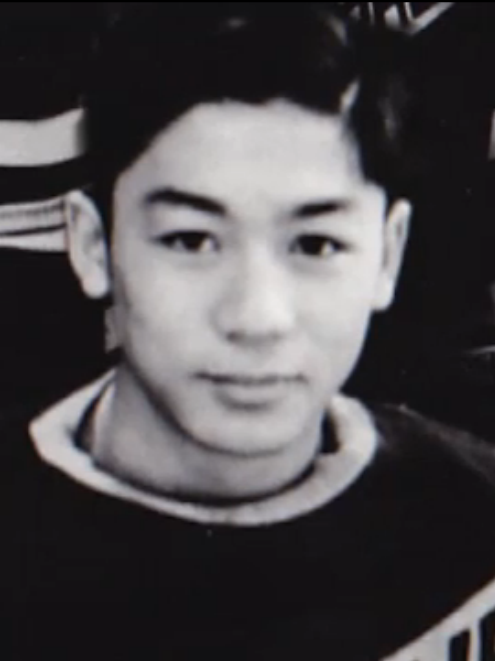
- Larry Kwong pictured with the Vernon Hydrophones in the 1938–39 season
- Born: June 17, 1923 Vernon, British Columbia, Canada
- Died: March 15, 2018 (aged 94) Calgary, Alberta, Canada
- Height: 5 ft 6 in (168 cm)
- Weight: 150 lb (68 kg; 10 st 10 lb)
- Position: Centre/Right Wing
- Shot: Right
- Played for: New York Rangers
- Playing career: 1941–1959

Lawrence Kwong (born Eng Kai Geong; Chinese: 吳啟光; pinyin: Wú Qǐguāng; Cantonese Yale: Ǹgh Káigwōng; June 17, 1923 – March 15, 2018) was a Canadian professional ice hockey forward who was the first player of Chinese descent in the National Hockey League (NHL), playing one shift late in the third period of a 1948 game. He was the NHL's first player who was neither white nor Indigenous North American, debuting ten years before Willie O'Ree. Although denied much playing time in the NHL, Kwong was a top player in senior hockey leagues outside the NHL throughout his entire career and battled the likes of Jean Béliveau for the scoring race in Quebec.

Kwong came from a Cantonese-speaking family, and was also the first NHL player from Vernon, British Columbia, and the Okanagan region. Kwong's nicknames included the "China Clipper" and "King Kwong".

Kwong continued his playing career in Europe and became the first ethnic Chinese coach of a professional hockey club in Switzerland. In his later years, he returned to Canada and operated a supermarket, following his father's footsteps.

== Early years ==
Kwong was born in 1923 in Vernon, British Columbia, as the second youngest of 15 children born to his Cantonese-speaking father who had two wives. His father had immigrated from China in 1884 for the gold rush in Cherry Creek, BC. His father later started farming and then went into the grocery business in Vernon, British Columbia, calling his store Kwong Hing Lung. Larry's Chinese surname was Eng, but decided to take the name of his father's store as the last name in his English name.

Just two weeks after his birth, the government of the Dominion of Canada enacted the Chinese Exclusion Act of 1923 which completely prohibited Chinese immigrants from entering Canada. Kwong faced numerous acts of racial discrimination during his youthful years in Vernon, as he recalled being denied service at a barbershop because of his ethnic background.

== Early playing career ==
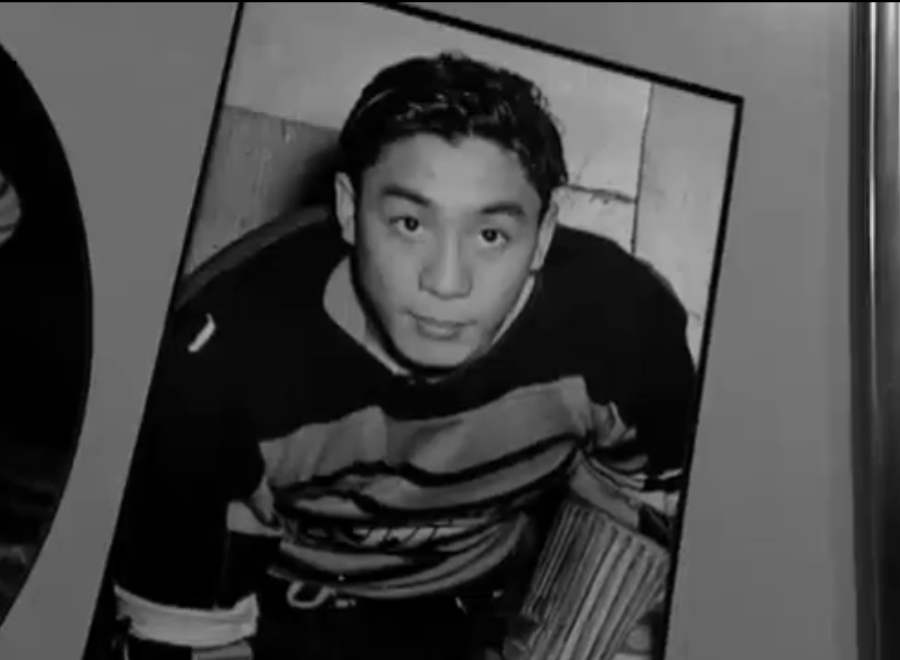
Larry Kwong pictured with the Trail Smoke Eaters

Kwong practiced ice hockey on outdoor rinks and frozen ponds around Vernon, before the city’s first indoor arena opened when he was 14 years old. He powered the Vernon Hydrophones to the midget hockey championship of BC in 1939 and then to the provincial juvenile title in 1941. As an 18-year-old, Kwong jumped the junior ranks to play senior hockey after a try-out for the elite semi-professional Trail Smoke Eaters, who had won the 1939 World Ice Hockey Championships. In Trail, players who made the roster got good-paying jobs at a local smelter, but Kwong was denied a job because of his Chinese heritage. Instead, he was sent to a nearby hotel to work as a bellhop.

In early 1944, Kwong was drafted into the Canadian Army. Instead of being deployed overseas, he was selected to join "Sugar" Jim Henry and Mac Colville on the Red Deer Wheelers of the Central Alberta Garrison Hockey League. The Wheelers defeated the Calgary Combines (starring two-time NHL scoring champion Sweeney Schriner) in the playoff semi-final, before falling to Calgary Currie Army (whose roster included Hart Trophy winners Max Bentley and Tommy Anderson) in the final series. In a game with the Wetaskiwin Army Colonels in 1945, Kwong scored 7 goals, including 6 in the third period alone, in a 9-3 victory over the Penhold Air Force team.

After World War II, Kwong returned to Trail and won the provincial senior hockey championship with the Smoke Eaters in 1946. In that BC Final series against the New Westminster Royals, Kwong led the Smokies in scoring (tied with Mike Buckna) and scored the Savage Cup-winning goal.

Later in 1946, Lester Patrick and Frank Boucher scouted Kwong and were impressed, signing him for the New York Rovers, a farm team of the New York Rangers. Kwong scored a goal in his debut for the Rovers against the Boston Olympics in Boston on October 27, 1946. At Madison Square Garden on November 17, 1946, Shavey Lee presented Kwong with the Key to New York's Chinatown. Kwong went on to lead the New York Rovers in scoring in 1947–1948 with 86 points in 65 games.

== NHL debut ==
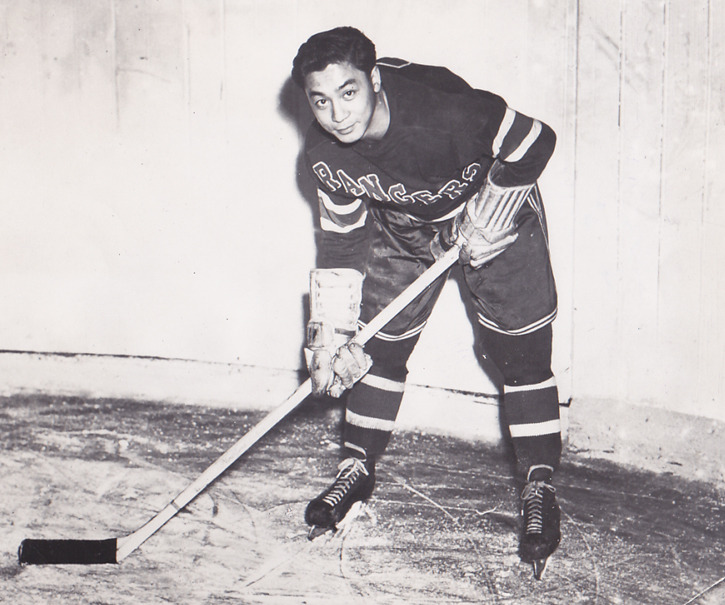
Kwong in New York Rangers uniform, 1946

On March 13, 1948, Kwong became the first player of Asian descent to play in the NHL. Kwong was not the first non-white player, having been preceded by several Indigenous athletes, including Paul Jacobs, Taffy Abel and Henry Maracle. Kwong wore number 8 and played against Maurice Richard and the Montreal Canadiens in the Montreal Forum. This event came less than a year after Jackie Robinson shattered the baseball colour line in the US. During this game, Kwong was benched until late in the third period, when he was sent to play his lone shift of the game. Spending just a minute on the ice, he tallied no points in what would be his only big-league game.

While several other Rover forwards were called to play subsequent games, Kwong was not, despite being the Rovers' top scorer and MVP. Kwong became convinced that he would not get an opportunity to prove himself at the NHL level with the Rangers, and he left the Rangers organization at the end of the season. In the off-season, Kwong accepted a more lucrative offer to play for the Valleyfield Braves of the Quebec Senior Hockey League.

== Career peak outside of the NHL ==
Kwong went on to have a long and successful career in senior and professional leagues in Canada and the United States. Coached by Toe Blake, Kwong was named as an alternate captain of the Valleyfield Braves. In 1951 Kwong won the Vimy Trophy as the Most Valuable Player (MVP) of the Quebec Senior Hockey League. That year, he led the Valleyfield Braves to the league championship and then to the Alexander Cup, the Canadian major senior title. In the following QSHL season (1951–52), Kwong's 38 goals were topped only by Jean Béliveau's 45 tallies. In his nine-year tenure in the Quebec League, competing against future NHL All-Stars such as Béliveau, Jacques Plante, Dickie Moore, Gerry McNeil and Jean-Guy Talbot, Kwong averaged better than a point per game. Béliveau, who later became a Hall of Fame inductee, said: "Larry made his wing men look good because he was a great passer. He was doing what a centre man is supposed to do."

== Player-coaching career ==
Kwong accepted an offer to play hockey in England and, later, in Switzerland, before it even became fashionable to do so in Europe. He expected only to stay for a year, but remained in Europe for 15 years. "I went there to coach ice hockey and then after six years of coaching, I decided to start teaching tennis as a tennis pro." Kwong spent one season with the Nottingham Panthers in Britain, scoring 55 goals in 55 games, before moving to Switzerland where he led HC Ambrì-Piotta in scoring as player-coach. With this coaching assignment, he became the first person of Chinese descent to coach a professional hockey team. He later coached HC Lugano, HC Lausanne, EHC Aarau and the Neuchâtel Young Sprinters. In 1960, Kwong led a team of expatriates, the Swiss Canadians, to victories over the Soviet and Czechoslovak national squads at the Geneva International Tournament. According to former Swiss Ice Hockey Federation CEO Patrick Bloch, Kwong was "a great ambassador and builder of hockey."

== Personal life ==
Kwong was married to Audrey Craven (1929–1979) in Nottingham in 1964. The couple had one daughter, Kristina Heintz. In 1972 Kwong returned to Canada with his family to run Food-Vale Supermarket with his brother Jack. In 1989 Kwong married Janine Boyer. He was widowed for a second time in 1999. Retired from the grocery business, he lived in Calgary, Alberta. Kwong died on March 15, 2018, in Calgary at the age of 94.

== Honours & achievements ==
Kwong has been honoured on numerous occasions. Below is a list of select honours:

=== On-ice achievements ===
1939: British Columbia Midget Hockey Championship (Cromie Cup)

1941: British Columbia Juvenile Hockey Championship (Monarch Life Cup)

1946: British Columbia Senior Hockey Championship; scored the Savage Cup-winning goal

1947-48: Leading scorer on the New York Rovers (86 points in 65 games), the top minor league team for the New York Rangers

March 13, 1948: Breaking the NHL's colour barrier by playing for the New York Rangers as the first player of Asian descent in the league

1950-51: Byng of Vimy Trophy winner as MVP of the Quebec Senior Hockey League; QSHL First Team All-Star Centre; league leader in assists (51), second in points (85), third in goals (34)

1951: Quebec Senior Hockey League Championship (O’Connell Trophy)

1951: Canadian Major Senior Hockey Championship (Alexander Cup)

1951-52: Second in QSHL scoring with 38 goals, only behind Jean Béliveau's 45 goals

1957-58: 55 goals in 55 games for the Nottingham Panthers in the British National League

1958-59: Leading scorer on HC Ambrì-Piotta (30 points in 14 games) in the Swiss National League A

=== Awards ===
November 17, 1946: Received Key to New York's Chinatown in Madison Square Garden

2002: Calgary's Asian Heritage Month Award

2009: Heritage Award from the Society of North American Historians and Researchers (SONAHR)

2010: Okanagan Hockey Group's inaugural Pioneer Award

November 23, 2011: Okanagan Sports Hall of Fame Honoured Member in the Athlete category

September 19, 2013: Honoured Member of the B.C. Sports Hall of Fame

July 23, 2016: Honoured Member of the Alberta Hockey Hall of Fame

December 7, 2022: Honoured with Paul Jacobs, Henry Maracle, Fred Sasakamoose and Willie O'Ree for breaking racial barriers in the NHL with a Canadian National Historic Event designation and commemorative plaque in Toronto

January 28, 2025: Seattle Kraken's Hero of the Deep Award

July 12, 2025: Honoured Member of the British Columbia Hockey Hall of Fame as a Player/Pioneer

Kwong's game-worn 1942–43 Nanaimo Clippers sweater hangs in the Hockey Hall of Fame as a part of its exhibit The Changing Face of Hockey – Diversity in Our Game.

=== Honorary appearances ===
2008: Saluted by the Calgary Flames of the National Hockey League at the Saddledome

2009: Honoured by the Vernon Vipers of the British Columbia Hockey League in a pre-game ceremony

=== Movies and media ===
2011: Kwong's story is featured in the documentary film Lost Years: A People's Struggle for Justice, written, directed and produced by Kenda Gee and Tom Radford.

2014: The Shift: The Story of the China Clipper, a documentary by Chester Sit, Wes Miron and Tracy Nagai, had its theatrical premiere in Vernon, BC.

2015: King Kwong: Larry Kwong, the China Clipper who Broke the NHL Colour Barrier, a biography by Paula Johanson, was published.

2024: The Longest Shot: How Larry Kwong Changed the Face of Hockey, a biography written by Chad Soon and George Chiang and illustrated by Amy Qi, was released by Orca Book Publishers.

== Career statistics ==
=== Regular season and playoffs ===
			Regular season					Playoffs
Season	Team	League	GP	G	A	Pts	PIM	GP	G	A	Pts	PIM
1940–41	Vernon Hydrophones	BCAHA	—	—	—	—	—	—	—	—	—	—
1941–42	Trail Smoke Eaters	ABCHL	29	9	13	22	10	3	0	0	0	0
1942–43	Nanaimo Clippers	VISHL	11	6	6	12	0	3	0	1	1	2
1943-44	Vancouver St. Regis	PCSHA	17	10	6	16	0	—	—	—	—	—
1943–44	Red Deer Army Wheelers	ASHL	2	0	0	0	0	5	1	2	3	0
1945–46	Trail Smoke Eaters	WKHL	19	12	8	20	12	10	9	3	12	10
1945–46	Trail Smoke Eaters	Al-Cup	—	—	—	—	—	5	2	1	3	0
1946–47	New York Rovers	EAHL	47	19	18	37	15	9	7	3	10	0
1947–48	New York Rangers	NHL	1	0	0	0	0	—	—	—	—	—
1947–48	New York Rovers	EAHL	17	13	16	29	5	—	—	—	—	—
1947–48	New York Rovers	QSHL	48	20	37	57	23	4	1	0	1	0
1948–49	Valleyfield Braves	QSHL	63	38	47	85	8	3	1	0	1	7
1949–50	Valleyfield Braves	QSHL	60	24	35	59	16	5	2	1	3	2
1950–51	Valleyfield Braves	QSHL	60	34	51	85	35	28	7	21	28	6
1951–52	Valleyfield Braves	QSHL	60	38	28	66	16	6	1	5	6	0
1952–53	Valleyfield Braves	QSHL	56	10	22	32	6	3	0	2	2	0
1953–54	Valleyfield Braves	QHL	68	24	25	49	17	7	3	3	6	2
1954–55	Valleyfield Braves	QHL	50	24	30	54	8	—	—	—	—	—
1955–56	Trois-Rivieres Lions	QHL	29	3	6	9	10	—	—	—	—	—
1955–56	Troy Bruins	IHL	21	9	9	18	2	5	1	2	3	2
1956–57	Troy Bruins	IHL	9	1	0	1	0	—	—	—	—	—
1956–57	Cornwall Chevies	OHA Sr	33	14	15	29	22	6	5	1	6	0
1957–58	Nottingham Panthers	BNL	31	39	15	54	6	24	16	9	25	4
1958-59	HC Ambrì-Piotta	NLA	14	19	11	30	—	—	—	—	—	—
Totals			745	366	398	764	211	126	56	54	110	35
NHL totals			1	0	0	0	0	—	—	—	—	—

== See also ==
- List of sports desegregation firsts
- Herb Carnegie, Hockey Hall of Fame honoured member who played against Kwong for 5 seasons in the QSHL
- Willie O'Ree, first black player in the NHL, a decade after Larry Kwong broke the colour barrier
- Mike Wong, former NHL player
- Robin Bawa, first player of South Asian descent in the NHL
- Jim Paek, two-time Stanley Cup champion
- Peter Ing, former NHL goalie
- Andong Song, first Chinese-born hockey player to be drafted by an NHL team (New York Islanders)
- List of players who played only one game in the NHL

== Bibliography ==
- Lost Years Official Website (Episode 1): http://www.lostyears.ca/episode-one.html
- Barman, Jean. The West Beyond the West: A History of British Columbia (Third Edition). Toronto: University of Toronto Press, 2007. ISBN 978-0-8020-9495-7.
- Cohen, Russ. 100 Things Rangers Fans Should Know & Do Before They Die. Chicago: Triumph Books, 2014. ISBN 9781600789175.
- Greig, Murray. Trail on Ice: A Century of Hockey in the Home of Champions. Trail: City of Trail Archives, 1999. ISBN 0-9690305-3-3.
- Johanson, Paula. King Kwong: Larry Kwong, the China Clipper Who Broke the NHL's Colour Barrier. Neustadt: Five Rivers Publishing, 2015. ISBN 9781927400753.
- Ma, Adrian. How the Chinese Created Canada. Dragon Hill Publishing Ltd., 2010. ISBN 978-1-896124-19-3.
- McKinley, Michael. Hockey: A People's History. Toronto: McClelland & Stewart Ltd, 2006. ISBN 978-0-7710-5769-4.
- Mortillaro, Nicole. Hockey Trailblazers. Markham: Scholastic Canada Ltd, 2011. ISBN 978-1-4431-0469-2.
- Poulton, J. Alexander. A History of Hockey in Canada. OverTime Books, 2010. ISBN 978-1-897277-56-0.
- Reid, Ken. One Night Only: Conversations with the NHL's One-Game Wonders. Toronto: ECW Press, 2016. ISBN 9781770412972.
- Soon, Chad and Chiang, George. The Longest Shot: How Larry Kwong Changed the Face of Hockey. Victoria: Orca Book Publishers, 2024. ISBN 9781459835030.
- Wong, David H.T. Escape to Gold Mountain: A Graphic History of the Chinese in North America. Vancouver: Arsenal Pulp Press, 2012. ISBN 9781551524764.
- Zweig, Eric. The Big Book of Hockey for Kids. Markham: Scholastic Canada Ltd, 2013. ISBN 9781443119528.
