= Chooks (disambiguation) =

Chook is an Australian/New Zealand slang term for a chicken.

Chook or chooks may also refer to:

== People ==
- Chook Sibtain (born 1969), Joplin Sibtain, English actor
- Charles "Chook" Fraser (1893–1981), Australian rugby league footballer
- Bill "Chook" Fowler, cricketer, born 1959
- Stan "Chook" Maxwell, (1935–2001), Canadian professional ice hockey player

== Food ==
- Chooks Fresh & Tasty, a Western Australian fast food chain
- Chooks-to-Go, a Filipino restaurant chain.

== See also ==
- Chooka (disambiguation)
