= Bill Riley (ice hockey, born 1950) =

Canadian ice hockey player (1950–2026)

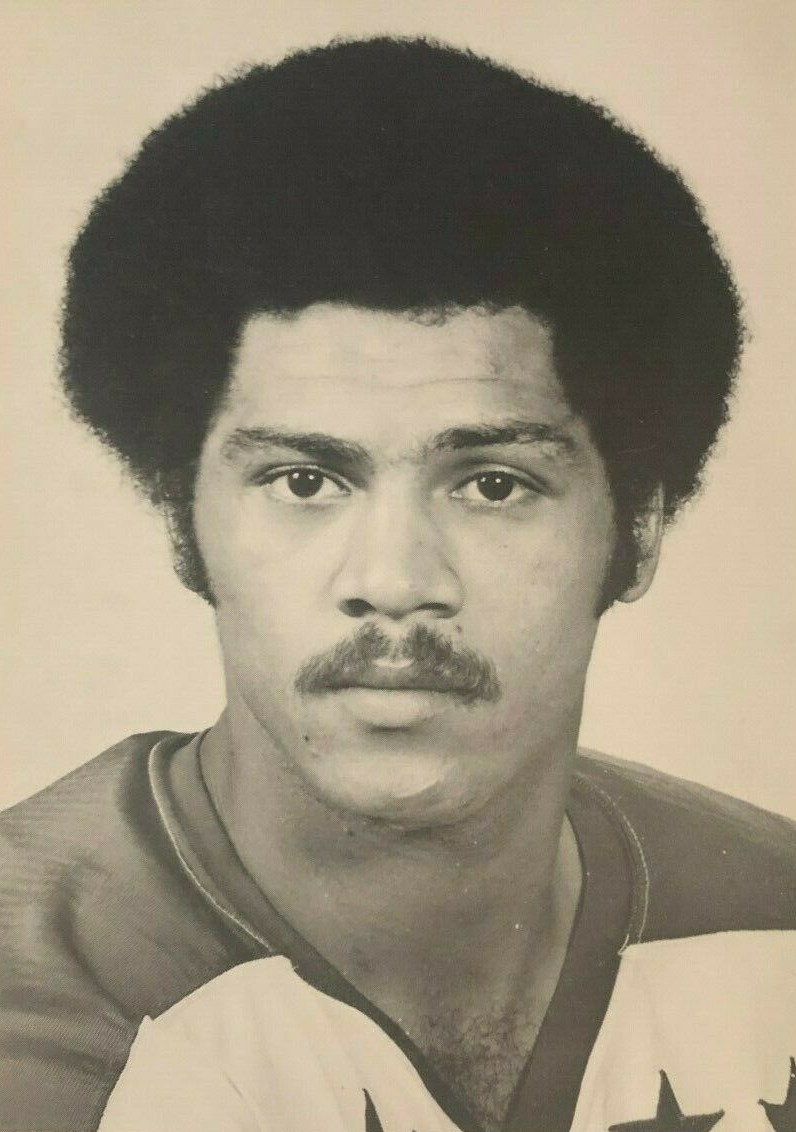
- Riley in 1976
- Born: 20 September 1950 Amherst, Nova Scotia, Canada
- Died: 29 March 2026 (aged 75) Amherst, Nova Scotia, Canada
- Height: 5 ft 11 in (180 cm)
- Weight: 195 lb (88 kg; 13 st 13 lb)
- Position: Right wing
- Shot: Right
- Played for: Washington Capitals; Winnipeg Jets
- NHL draft: Undrafted
- Playing career: 1974–1989

William James Riley (20 September 1950 – 29 March 2026) was a Canadian professional ice hockey player, and was the third black player and first of African Nova Scotian descent in the National Hockey League (NHL). He played 139 games for the Washington Capitals and Winnipeg Jets between 1974 and 1980. The rest of his career, which lasted from 1974 to 1989, was spent in the minor leagues.

== Early life ==
Riley's mother worked as a cleaning lady, while his father earned the minimum wage of $1.25 per hour. With limited finances, they made the necessary sacrifices to outfit their son with the required equipment to play hockey starting in peewee. Riley stuck with the game in spite of the absence of many black role models in the sport. After two seasons with the Amherst Ramblers, a team he would go on to coach many years later, he held no aspirations of pursuing hockey as a big-league career.

In 1973 while working in a factory and playing senior hockey with the Kitimat Eagles senior team in the Pacific Northwest Hockey League in British Columbia, Riley was discovered after putting up 206 points in 80 games across two seasons. Future NHL coach Tom McVie was in the process of fortifying his lineup for the Dayton Gems of the International Hockey League (IHL). He discovered Riley in Kitimat and invited him for a tryout. Riley accepted and made the club in 1974.

== Career ==
Riley was given a tryout with the Washington Capitals during their inaugural season in 1974-75 and played just one game on 26 December 1974. In that game, he shared the ice with Capitals left winger Mike Marson, making the duo the first black teammates in the NHL. Riley spent the rest of the season and the next season in the minors with Dayton. It was during this time that he was reunited with and played under future Capitals' coach McVie. He would eventually be signed as a free agent by the Capitals during the 1976–77 NHL season and played for the team in parts of the next three seasons.

Riley was claimed by the Winnipeg Jets in the 1979 NHL Expansion Draft, but only played in 14 games before he was sent to the minors, where he played, with the New Brunswick Hawks, Moncton Alpines and the Nova Scotia Voyageurs, until he retired following the 1983–84 season. Riley was the captain on the 1981-82 Hawks teams that won the AHL's Calder Cup championship.

Riley was back on the ice as player-coach and captain of the St. John's Capitals of the Newfoundland Senior Hockey League for three seasons during the late 1980s.

== Coaching career ==
After retiring from professional play, Riley returned to coaching in 1989-90, when he landed a head coaching position with the Amherst Ramblers of the Maritime Junior A Hockey League. Later, he was the head coach, general manager and director of player personnel of the Miramichi Timberwolves of the Maritime Junior A Hockey League. He also served as head coach of the Moncton Wildcats during the 1996–97 season, finishing with a 16–52–2 record.

== Personal life and death ==
Riley was roommates with Dave Feamster, and together they once poached a deer, to provide meat for Riley and his family.

Riley's son, Billy Jr., was killed in a motor vehicle accident in 2011 in Moncton at age 35.

In 2017, after seeing a segment on Hockey Night in Canada about Toronto Maple Leafs player Bill Barilko, Riley sent his daughter, who lived in Timmins, to the site of Barilko's grave to clean his tombstone.

Riley died from cancer on 29 March 2026, aged 75.

== Awards and honours ==
- Calder Cup (As a player) - 1982
- Callaghan Cup (As a coach) - 1990
- Nova Scotia Sport Hall of Fame - 1998
- Number 8 jersey retired by Amherst Ramblers - 2013

== Career statistics ==
=== Regular season and playoffs ===
			Regular season					Playoffs
Season	Team	League	GP	G	A	Pts	PIM	GP	G	A	Pts	PIM
1968–69	Amherst Ramblers	MJHL	48	32	32	64	—	—	—	—	—	—
1969–70	Amherst Ramblers	MJHL	30	34	28	62	—	1	0	0	0	0
1970–71	Amherst Square M's	MJHL	—	—	—	—	—	—	—	—	—	—
1971–72	Kitimat Eagles	BCSHL	—	—	—	—	—	—	—	—	—	—
1972–73	Kitimat Eagles	BCSHL	40	56	32	88	—	—	—	—	—	—
1973–74	Kitimat Eagles	BCSHL	40	76	42	118	—	—	—	—	—	—
1974–75	Washington Capitals	NHL	1	0	0	0	0	—	—	—	—	—
1974–75	Dayton Gems	IHL	63	12	16	28	279	14	5	0	5	29
1975–76	Dayton Gems	IHL	69	35	31	66	301	15	6	10	16	54
1976–77	Washington Capitals	NHL	43	13	14	27	124	—	—	—	—	—
1976–77	Dayton Gems	IHL	30	19	15	34	69	—	—	—	—	—
1977–78	Washington Capitals	NHL	57	13	12	25	125	—	—	—	—	—
1978–79	Washington Capitals	NHL	24	2	2	4	64	—	—	—	—	—
1978–79	Hershey Bears	AHL	51	15	15	30	118	4	1	0	1	8
1979–80	Winnipeg Jets	NHL	14	3	2	5	7	—	—	—	—	—
1979–80	Nova Scotia Voyageurs	AHL	63	31	33	64	157	4	0	0	0	2
1980–81	New Brunswick Hawks	AHL	46	12	25	37	107	12	3	3	6	49
1981–82	New Brunswick Hawks	AHL	80	32	30	62	104	15	8	8	16	6
1982–83	Moncton Alpines	AHL	73	33	30	63	134	—	—	—	—	—
1983–84	Nova Scotia Voyageurs	AHL	78	24	24	48	79	12	2	5	7	8
1986–87	St. John's Capitals	NFLD	44	29	33	62	—	—	—	—	—	—
1987–88	St. John's Capitals	NFLD	37	39	63	102	43	—	—	—	—	—
1988–89	St. John's Capitals	NFLD	29	25	36	61	—	—	—	—	—	—
AHL totals			391	147	157	304	699	47	14	16	30	73
NHL totals			139	31	30	61	320	—	—	—	—	—
