= Black Girl Hockey Club =

American non-profit organization

- Formation: October 31, 2018; 8 years ago
- Region served: North America
- Members: 500+
- Executive Director: Renee Hess
- Website: blackgirlhockeyclub.org

Black Girl Hockey Club is a North American nonprofit organization that advocates for Black women in ice hockey. The organization is guided by a mission to "inspire and sustain passion for the game of hockey within the Black community," specifically among Black women, their families, friends and allies, and to "prevent exclusion in hockey based on race, gender, sexuality or ability in the face of institutional racism, financial gatekeeping, and program access."

== History ==
The organisation was founded in October 2018 by Renee Hess, an assistant director at La Sierra University and Pittsburgh Penguins fan, as an online chat group for Black women in hockey. Hess previously conducted a study on Black women's experiences in hockey, the Black Hockey Research Project, noting that many experienced discrimination at games and that there were only three Black women playing professional ice hockey in North America at the time. The group quickly grew, and began organising meet-ups at NHL and NWHL games. The first NHL meet-up was held at a Washington Capitals match on December 16, 2018, and was attended by over 40 members, including NWHLer Kelsey Koelzer.

In January 2019, the group organised a campaign to help 12-year-old Minnesotan Kalei Forga raise the funds she needed to play at the 2019 World Selects Invitational in France. In March 2019, the group began the process of gaining nonprofit certification.

In 2020, the organisation announced its first scholarship programme aiming to subsidize the costs of playing hockey for Black girls ages 9–18 years old. In September 2020, the organisation launched the Get Uncomfortable campaign, which included a set of recommendations for how entities involved in ice hockey can contribute to the movement against the oppression of BIPOC communities and asking members of the hockey community to pledge to actively disrupt racism on and off the ice. In 2021, BGHC launched a mentorship program for Black adult professionals of all genders looking to get involved in hockey in a non-playing capacity. Areas of mentorship range from broadcast journalism to physiotherapy and photography. There are two six month terms per year but applications are open for mentors and mentees interested throughout the year. The Black Girl Hockey Club's scholarship program has helped Black women pursue opportunities in college hockey. In 2023, NHL.com reported that three scholarship recipients were playing NCAA women's hockey. One recipient, Dayton O'Donoghue, used scholarship funding to attend a recruiting showcase in Florida, where she connected with collage coaches. Another recipient, Willow Poppleton, used her scholarship toward tuition at Lake Forest College. These examples show how the club's financial support can help players continue their education while pursuing hockey.

== See also ==
- Race and ethnicity in the NHL
- Black players in ice hockey
- Misogyny in ice hockey
