= Art Dorrington =

Canadian ice hockey player (1930–2017)

- Born: March 13, 1930 Truro, Nova Scotia, Canada
- Died: December 29, 2017 (aged 87) Atlantic City, New Jersey, U.S.
- Height: 5 ft 9 in (175 cm)
- Weight: 160 lb (73 kg; 11 st 6 lb)
- Position: Centre
- Shot: Left
- Played for: Atlantic City Seagulls; New Haven Tomahawks; Washington Lions; Boston Olympics; Johnstown Jets; Philadelphia Ramblers
- Playing career: 1949–1958

Art Dorrington (March 13, 1930 – December 29, 2017) was a Canadian professional ice hockey centre.

Dorrington became the first black hockey player to sign a National Hockey League (NHL) contract when he joined the New York Rangers organization in 1950. Despite putting up very good statistics in the minor leagues, he was never able to make it to the major league ranks. Dorrington played for the Atlantic City Seagulls of the Eastern Hockey League.

After retiring from hockey, Dorrington joined the Atlantic County Sheriff's Office. In the late 1990s he created the Art Dorrington Ice Hockey Foundation, a program that teaches hockey to children from low-income families in Atlantic City.

He died on December 29, 2017, at the age of 87 in Atlantic City.

== See also ==
- John Utendale, the first Black player to sign an NHL contract directly with an NHL team (the Detroit Red Wings), although only played for their minor league team and did not play in an NHL game
- Willie O'Ree, the first Black player to play in an NHL game (the Boston Bruins)
- Black players in ice hockey
- Race and ethnicity in the NHL
