= John Utendale =

Canadian ice hockey player, coach, professor (1937–2006)

John Frederick Utendale (/ˈjuːtəndeɪl/; January 15, 1937 – August 24, 2006) was a Canadian professional ice hockey player, ice hockey coach, and college professor. He signed a contract with the Detroit Red Wings in 1955, becoming the first Black man to sign a contract with a National Hockey League team. Utendale later became a professor at Western Washington State College (now Western Washington University) as the first Black faculty member of the school's Woodring College of Education.

== Early life and hockey career ==
Utendale was born on January 15, 1937, in Edmonton, Alberta, Canada, to father Alfred and mother Grayce. While still in high school, he began playing hockey with the Edmonton Oil Kings. He signed a contract with the Red Wings in 1955, three years before Willie O'Ree broke the NHL's color barrier by playing his first game with the Boston Bruins. Utendale practiced with the Red Wings but never played in an NHL game. He played with the Red Wings' minor league affiliate, the Edmonton Flyers. During the 1958–59 season, Utendale played with the Quebec Aces with fellow Black players O'Ree and Stan Maxwell on "The Black Line".

In 2006, John's brother Paul Utendale claimed that Jack Adams, the Red Wings' coach and general manager, refused to give John any playing time because Adams objected to John's relationship with Mickey, a white woman who he later married. Mickey and her son Robb said in 2021 that they suspect that John’s relationship with Mickey prevented John from getting playing time with the Red Wings.

== Transition to education ==
Utendale earned a teaching certificate from the University of British Columbia in 1961. While at UBC, he played for the Thunderbirds hockey team for one season, leading the team in scoring. Utendale earned an undergraduate degree in education at the University of Alberta in 1963, after only two years of study while playing semi-pro hockey for local teams.

Utendale's first educational job was as the first director of physical education at the Northern Alberta Institute of Technology, where he also coached the school's hockey team. He played for several minor hockey teams until 1969, when he ended his hockey playing career and began pursuing a master's degree at Eastern Washington State College (now Eastern Washington University). After earning his master's degree, he was hired as an academic coordinator for the athletics department at Washington State University. At WSU, Utendale also taught in the Black studies department and was a member of the Washington State Human Rights Commission. While fulfilling all these duties, Utendale also earned a doctorate in education from WSU.

== Educational career ==
Western Washington State College (now Western Washington University) in Bellingham, Washington, hired Utendale as the first Black faculty member of its Woodring College of Education. Utendale headed Western's master's degree program in student personnel administration for over 25 years. He was recognized nationally for his efforts to increase Western's minority student population. He later earned academic tenure at WWU.

While at Western, Utendale coached the Western Washington Vikings men's hockey team. He was the western regional director of the United States Amateur Hockey Association (now USA Hockey). He also co-founded the Bellingham Area Minor Hockey Association and coached the city's junior ice hockey team.

In 1980, Utendale was named as an assistant training coach with the United States men's national ice hockey team, thus becoming the first Black member of the team's coaching staff. The team won gold at the 1980 Winter Olympics in a campaign that included the famous "Miracle on Ice" game.

Utendale retired from WWU in 2001. He remained in Bellingham until his death in 2006.

== Personal life ==
Utendale married Maryan "Mickey" Maddison Leonard in 1959. They remained married until his death from cancer in 2006. The couple had two sons.

The Seattle Kraken honored Utendale at its February 24, 2022, game as part of Black History Month festivities.

== See also ==
- Art Dorrington, the first Black player to sign an NHL contract, in 1950 with a minor league team in the New York Rangers organization
- Willie O'Ree, the first Black player to play in an NHL game
- Black players in ice hockey
- Race and ethnicity in the NHL
