= Tony McKegney =

Canadian ice hockey player

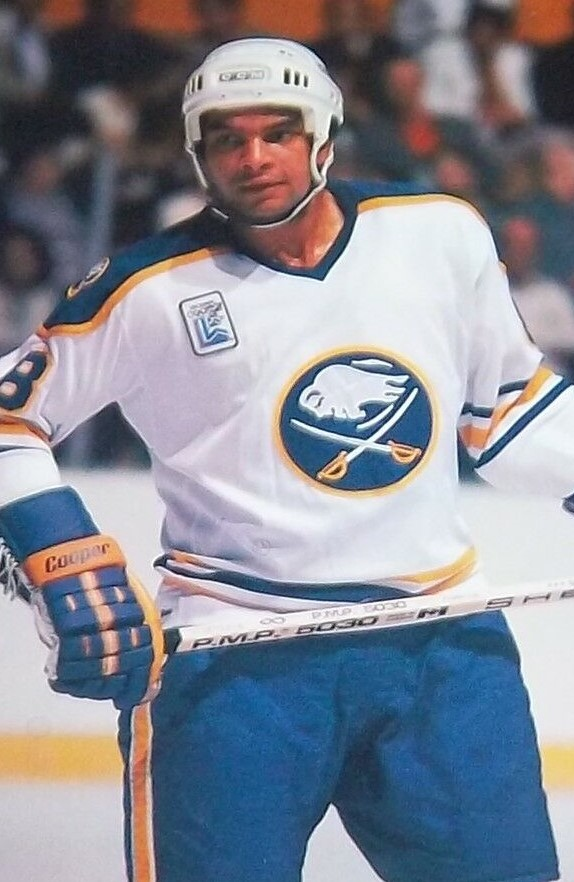
- Born: February 15, 1958 (age 68) Montreal, Quebec, Canada
- Height: 6 ft 1 in (185 cm)
- Weight: 200 lb (91 kg; 14 st 4 lb)
- Position: Left wing
- Shot: Left
- Played for: Buffalo Sabres; Quebec Nordiques; Minnesota North Stars; New York Rangers; St. Louis Blues; Detroit Red Wings; Chicago Blackhawks; Varese HC
- National team: Canada
- NHL draft: 32nd overall, 1978; Buffalo Sabres
- Playing career: 1978–1991

Anthony Syiid McKegney (born February 15, 1958) is a Canadian former professional ice hockey player who played 13 seasons in the National Hockey League (NHL) from 1978–79 until 1990–91. He is the first Black player in NHL history to score 40 goals in a season.

== Career ==
McKegney was drafted 32nd overall by the Buffalo Sabres in the 1978 NHL Amateur Draft. On June 8, 1983, after five seasons with the Sabres, he was traded along with centers Andre Savard and J.F. Sauve to the Quebec Nordiques in exchange for winger Real Cloutier and Quebec's first-round draft pick in the 1983 draft.

McKegney was born in Montreal, to a Nigerian father and Canadian mother, but was adopted soon thereafter, and raised by a white family in Sarnia, Ontario. As a teenager he played Jr. 'B' hockey in Sarnia. He was following in the footsteps of his older brother Ian, who had been a star with the Sarnia Legionnaires before moving on to the pros. At age twenty, Tony McKegney signed a contract with the now defunct World Hockey Association’s (WHA) Birmingham Bulls, only to see the owner illegally renege on the deal after fans threatened to boycott the team for having added a black player to its roster. However, the WHA’s loss became the NHL’s gain, as McKegney would go on to score over 300 career goals, including 40 in the 1987-88 season. His total of 78 points in one season would remain the highest ever recorded by a black player until Jarome Iginla's breakout 2001-2002 campaign. He registered nine 20-goal seasons in a career that lasted over 900 games.

After finishing the 1990-91 season with the Chicago Blackhawks, McKegney would spend a season in Italy with HC Varese, as well as three games with the Canadian National Team.

Terry Crisp, who was on the Canadian National Team coaching staff was named the head coach of the Tampa Bay Lightning for their inaugural season in 1992-93, raising McKegney's hopes that he could mount an NHL comeback with the club. He felt that he could be a veteran leader for the expansion club, but he didn't crack the roster and instead played 23 games with the San Diego Gulls in 1992-93 before retiring.

McKegney currently does periodic work on behalf of the Red Wings Alumni Association and the Buffalo Sabres Alumni Hockey Team.

== Achievements and awards ==
- OMJHL First All-Star Team (1977)
- OMJHL Second All-Star Team (1978)

== Career statistics ==
=== Regular season and playoffs ===
			Regular season					Playoffs
Season	Team	League	GP	G	A	Pts	PIM	GP	G	A	Pts	PIM
1974–75	Kingston Canadians	OMJHL	52	27	48	75	36	8	5	7	12	0
1975–76	Kingston Canadians	OMJHL	65	24	56	80	20	7	5	6	11	2
1976–77	Kingston Canadians	OMJHL	66	58	77	135	30	14	13	10	23	14
1977–78	Kingston Canadians	OMJHL	55	43	49	92	19	5	3	3	6	0
1978–79	Hershey Bears	AHL	24	21	18	39	4	1	0	0	0	0
1978–79	Buffalo Sabres	NHL	52	8	14	22	10	2	0	1	1	0
1979–80	Buffalo Sabres	NHL	80	23	29	52	24	14	3	4	7	2
1980–81	Buffalo Sabres	NHL	80	37	32	69	24	8	5	3	8	2
1981–82	Buffalo Sabres	NHL	73	23	29	52	41	4	0	0	0	2
1982–83	Buffalo Sabres	NHL	78	36	37	73	18	10	3	1	4	4
1983–84	Quebec Nordiques	NHL	75	24	27	51	23	7	0	0	0	0
1984–85	Quebec Nordiques	NHL	30	12	9	21	12	—	—	—	—	—
1984–85	Minnesota North Stars	NHL	27	11	13	24	4	9	8	6	14	0
1985–86	Minnesota North Stars	NHL	70	15	25	40	48	5	2	1	3	22
1986–87	Minnesota North Stars	NHL	11	2	3	5	16	—	—	—	—	—
1986–87	New York Rangers	NHL	64	29	17	46	56	6	0	0	0	12
1987–88	St. Louis Blues	NHL	80	40	38	78	82	9	3	6	9	8
1988–89	St. Louis Blues	NHL	71	25	17	42	58	3	0	1	1	0
1989–90	Detroit Red Wings	NHL	14	2	1	3	8	—	—	—	—	—
1989–90	Quebec Nordiques	NHL	48	16	11	27	45	—	—	—	—	—
1990–91	Quebec Nordiques	NHL	50	17	16	33	44	—	—	—	—	—
1990–91	Chicago Blackhawks	NHL	9	0	1	1	4	2	0	0	0	4
1991–92	Varese HC	ITA	16	15	13	28	70	6	8	2	10	12
1991–92	Varese HC	Alp	17	18	14	32	55	—	—	—	—	—
1991–92	Canada	Intl	3	2	2	4	6	—	—	—	—	—
1992–93	San Diego Gulls	IHL	23	8	5	13	38	3	0	1	1	4
NHL totals			912	320	319	639	517	79	24	23	47	56

=== International ===
Year	Team	Event	GP	G	A	Pts	PIM
1978	Canada	WJC	6	2	6	8	0
