= Chooka =

Chooka may refer to:

- Chooka Talesh F.C., Iranian football club based in Talesh, Iran
- Chooka Parker, a contestant musician in season 5 of Australia's Got Talent
