= Stan "Chook" Maxwell =

Canadian ice hockey player (1935–2001)

- Born: 24 March 1935 Truro, Nova Scotia
- Died: September 7, 2001 (aged 66) Truro, Nova Scotia
- Position: Centre
- Shot: Left
- Played for: Quebec Aces; Kingston Frontenacs; Hull-Ottawa Canadiens; Toledo Blades
- Playing career: 1959–1971

Stan Maxwell, known as "Chook" Maxwell (March 24, 1935 – September 7, 2001) was a Canadian professional ice hockey player whose professional hockey career spanned from 1959 to 1971. Stan “Chook” Maxwell is documented as one of the earliest Black professional hockey players, first appearing with the Quebec Aces. He frequently played with Willie O'Ree throughout the span of eight years and five different organizations. He also once competed in a professional exhibition game with the Boston Bruins at Boston Garden. In 1980, he was inducted to the Nova Scotia Sport Hall of Fame.

== Early life ==
On March 24, 1935, Stan “Chook” Maxwell was born and raised in Truro in the province of Nova Scotia in Canada. He was the second oldest of fifteen children.

Growing up, Chook Maxwell was skilled in a variety of sports, but his greatest strengths were baseball and ice hockey. The young Truro boy purchased his first set of skates at a yard sale. It is said that he practiced with his siblings more than 14 hours a day on ponds around Truro, where he tallied his first 500 goals between rocks that served as goalposts.

Early on, he was scouted and travelled to Quebec to play junior ice hockey.

== Career ==
=== Hockey ===
While competing in the Quebec Junior Hockey League for the Royal Montreal Hockey Club, Three Rivers Flames, and Quebec Citadelles, Stan "Chook" Maxwell earned a reputation for himself.

A 20-year-old Chook Maxwell signed with Punch Imlach for $3,000 per season to play professionally with the Quebec Aces, a senior league team affiliated with the Boston Bruins. When he turned pro with the Aces of the Quebec Senior Hockey League, he played with frequent teammate Willie O'Ree. In the 1955–56 season, he scored 12 goals and dished out 12 assists. He helped the Quebec Aces in their Edinburgh Trophy victory against the Brandon Regals in 1957. In 1957 and 1958, the Boston Bruins welcomed prospects Chook and Willie O'Ree to training camp. The pair competed in a professional exhibition game with the Boston Bruins against the Springfield Indians of the American Hockey League at Boston Garden. On January 18, 1958, O'Ree was called up from the Quebec Aces to the Boston Bruins for two games, making him the NHL's first player of colour. Chook Maxwell was not promoted to the NHL team's parent organization and competed in the semi-pro league until 1959. He competed against players like Gordie Howe, Henri Richard, and Jean Beliveau while playing for Quebec Aces, scoring 60 goals and dishing out 75 assists.

Chook Maxwell's professional hockey career continued in the Eastern Professional Hockey League. He played for the Kingston Frontenacs in Kingston, Ontario, from 1959 to 1961, and was one of their top scorers during that time. He was a member of the Hull-Ottawa Canadiens for the 1961–62 EPHL season, who were the champions of the Eastern Professional Hockey League that year. It was a Montreal Canadiens-affiliated minor league team that included Willie O'Ree, Keith McCreary, Bob Armstrong (ice hockey), and Jacques Laperrière.

He later played in the Western Hockey League for the Los Angeles Blades from 1961 until 1965. In his 4 seasons with the Los Angeles Blades, Chook recorded 45 goals and 67 assists.

From 1966 to 1971, Stan “Chook” Maxell played in the International Hockey League with the Toledo Blades, a team affiliated with the Los Angeles Kings. From 1966 to 1969, he had three straight seasons with the most points in the league. Chook contributed to the team's Turner Cup victory over the Fort Wayne Komets in the 1966–67 season. He tallied 140 goals and 194 assists in 5 seasons with the Toledo Blades.

=== Baseball ===
Stan "Chook" Maxwell was also a skilled baseball player. During the 1950s, he spent five seasons playing semipro baseball in the Halifax and District Baseball League with the Truro Bearcats.

Despite receiving a contract offer from Jeff Jones and the Milwaukee Braves in 1959 to play professional baseball, Chook Maxwell chose to focus on professional hockey instead.

== Retirement ==
In 1971, Maxwell retired from playing professional hockey with the Toledo Blades after suffering from an injury.

== Death ==
Stan “Chook” Maxwell died from cancer on September 7, 2001, at the age of 66 years old.

Maxwell's funeral took place in 11 September 2001, the same morning that the World Trade Center in New York City was attacked. Long time friend and teammate, Willie O'Ree, delivered the eulogy.

== Honors and awards ==
- 1957 Edinburgh Trophy Champion with the Quebec Aces.
- 1961–62 EPHL season League Champion with the Hull-Ottawa Canadiens.
- 1967 Turner Cup Champion with the Toledo Blades.
- IHL Second All-Star Team. (1968–1969)
- Inductee of the Nova Scotia Sport Hall of Fame. (1980)
- Inductee of the Truro Sports Hall of Fame. (1987)
- Inductee of the Black Ice Hockey and Sports Hall of Fame. (2006)
- Honored by Stan ‘Chook’ Maxwell Memorial Park in Truro, Nova Scotia.
