= Henry Maracle =

Canadian ice hockey player (1904–1958)

- Buddy Maracle pictured in a 1931 newspaper
- Born: September 8, 1904 Ayr, Ontario, Canada
- Died: June 20, 1958 (aged 53) Dallas, Texas, US
- Height: 5 ft 11 in (180 cm)
- Weight: 195 lb (88 kg; 13 st 13 lb)
- Position: Left wing
- Shot: Left
- Played for: New York Rangers
- Playing career: 1926–1939

Henry Elmer "Buddy" Maracle (September 8, 1904 – June 20, 1958) was a Canadian professional ice hockey player who played eleven games in the National Hockey League with the New York Rangers during the 1930–31 season. Born in Ayr, Ontario, but grew up in Haileybury, Ontario. A member of the Mohawk tribe, Maracle was the first full-blooded First Nations hockey player in the National Hockey League at the time of his recall to the New York Rangers in March 1931.

== Early life ==
Research has suggested that Maracle's family heritage draws from the Oneida Mohawks. His family picked up and moved from the reserve at Six Nations of the Grand River to Ayr early in the 20th century. Maracle was born in Ayr in 1904 to Albert Maracle and Elsie Hill. After moving to Haileybury, Maracle took up the game of hockey at the high school level.

== Career ==
Maracle's hockey career lasted 20 years, and he is known to have suited up for teams across North America, including the North Bay Trappers of the Northern Ontario Hockey Association, Toronto Industrial of the TIHL, the Springfield Indians of the Canadian–American Hockey League (Can-Am), the New York Rangers of the National Hockey League, the Bronx Tigers of the Can-Am, the New Haven Eagles of the Can-Am, the Philadelphia Arrows of the Can-Am, the Tulsa Oilers of the American Hockey Association, and the Detroit Pontiacs of the Michigan–Ontario Hockey League.

Maracle spent six seasons in Springfield, and eventually became the club's captain. He was called up to the NHL by the New York Rangers half-way through the 1930-31 season, and played 15 games for the team.

== Personal ==
Maracle married Josephine Hardman. He died in Dallas, Texas in 1958 of complications from anemia. He had been a truck driver for a produce company at the time of his death.

== Legacy ==
The NHL has not recognized Maracle's place in League history despite mounting evidence and research published in 2018 by multiple authors, including from The Ayr News and The Hockey News. Instead the focus has been to accept Fred Sasakmoose's 1953 debut with the Chicago Blackhawks as the league's first indigenous player representation in a regular season game. In a competing claim, a third player, Paul Jacobs, is also alleged to have been the first indigenous player when he supposedly played a single game for the Toronto Arenas in the NHL in 1918, the league's second season. However, newspaper records suggest he may have only practiced with the team in the pre-season before heading back to Quebec.

In 2018, the Rangers donated a pair of modern-day jerseys emblazoned with Maracle's name and number 14 to rinks in Ayr and at Six Nations.

In 2020, the Ontario Sports Hall of Fame notified The Ayr News that Maracle was being considered for induction.

== Career statistics ==
=== Regular season and playoffs ===
			Regular season					Playoffs
Season	Team	League	GP	G	A	Pts	PIM	GP	G	A	Pts	PIM
1921–22	Haileybury Public School	HS-CA	—	—	—	—	—	4	3	5	8	—
1922–23	North Bay Trappers	NOHA	—	—	—	—	—	—	—	—	—	—
1923–24	North Bay Trappers	NOHA	6	11	0	11	—	5	11	0	11	—
1924–25	North Bay Trappers	NOHA	—	—	—	—	—	—	—	—	—	—
1925–26	Toronto Industrial	TIHL	—	—	—	—	—	—	—	—	—	—
1926–27	Springfield Indians	Can-Am	32	5	1	6	44	6	2	1	3	4
1927–28	Springfield Indians	Can-Am	40	15	3	18	65	3	2	1	3	0
1928–29	Springfield Indians	Can-Am	37	4	4	8	47	—	—	—	—	—
1929–30	Springfield Indians	Can-Am	31	5	4	9	22	—	—	—	—	—
1930–31	New York Rangers	NHL	11	1	3	4	4	4	0	0	0	0
1930–31	Springfield Indians	Can-Am	26	6	4	10	44	—	—	—	—	—
1931–32	Bronx Tigers	Can-Am	1	0	0	0	0	—	—	—	—	—
1931–32	Springfield Indians	Can-Am	27	3	9	12	14	—	—	—	—	—
1933–34	New Haven Eagles	Can-Am	40	11	6	17	31	—	—	—	—	—
1934–35	New Haven Eagles	Can-Am	29	8	7	15	20	—	—	—	—	—
1934–35	Philadelphia Arrows	Can-Am	14	6	3	9	4	—	—	—	—	—
1935–36	Tulsa Oilers	AHA	48	12	8	20	17	3	0	0	0	0
1936–37	Tulsa Oilers	AHA	42	3	10	13	12	—	—	—	—	—
1938–39	Detroit Pontiacs	MOHL	22	3	5	8	2	7	1	0	1	6
Can-Am totals			277	63	41	104	291	9	4	2	6	4
NHL totals			11	1	3	4	4	4	0	0	0	0
