= Mike Marson =

Canadian ice hockey player

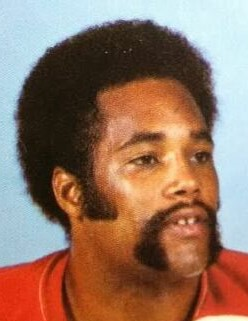
- Born: July 24, 1955 (age 71) Scarborough, Ontario, Canada
- Height: 5 ft 9 in (175 cm)
- Weight: 200 lb (91 kg; 14 st 4 lb)
- Position: Left wing
- Shot: Left
- Played for: Washington Capitals; Los Angeles Kings
- NHL draft: 19th overall, 1974; Washington Capitals
- Playing career: 1974–1981

Michael Robert Marson (born July 24, 1955) is a Canadian former professional ice hockey player. He played as a left winger during six seasons in the National Hockey League (NHL) for the Washington Capitals and Los Angeles Kings from 1974 to 1979. He was the second Black Canadian to play in the NHL.

== Hockey career ==
=== Amateur ===
As a youth, Marson played in the 1968 Quebec International Pee-Wee Hockey Tournament with a minor ice hockey team from Wexford, Toronto. During the 1973–74 OHA season, he was named a second team all-star, and led the Sudbury Wolves with 94 points at age 18.

=== Professional ===
Marson was drafted as the first pick of the 2nd round, 19th overall, by the Washington Capitals in the 1974 NHL entry draft. He signed a five-year contract with the Capitals and would become the second Black Canadian to play in the NHL, following Willie O'Ree. He was available in the 1974 NHL Amateur Draft because of league's decision to allow drafting of underage players that year.

His first NHL game was also the first game in Washington Capitals franchise history played on October 9, 1974. He recorded his best NHL season as a rookie when he scored 16 goals, added 12 assists for 28 points in 76 games.

Marson claims to have encountered discrimination early in his first season, and has recalled having the racial slurs "nigger" and "sambo" yelled at him during his first game at Maple Leaf Gardens against the Toronto Maple Leafs.

His teammates expressed how the slurs and taunts adversely impacted Marson: "There were racial slurs that were fired and he'd be quick [to react]. He had a short fuse. The next thing you knew, he'd be involved in something. It was hard for him to work on his game. And he could skate. He was one of the best skaters in the league, but he spent so much energy having to defend himself," said teammate Ron Lalonde.

He also was the target of numerous death threats.

Marson struggled with weight problems and alcoholism during his career.

In all, Marson played 196 games in the NHL (193 with Washington and three with Los Angeles). He totaled 48 points on 24 goals and 24 assists and amassed 233 penalty minutes.

During his career in the American Hockey League, Marson played for the Baltimore Clippers, Springfield Indians, Hershey Bears, Philadelphia Firebirds, and Binghamton Dusters.

== Personal life ==
Marson attended classes at the University of Maryland during his playing days in Washington.

At age 17, while playing junior hockey in Sudbury, Ontario, Canada, he suffered the loss of his mother who died unexpectedly of a brain aneurysm. Nearly four years later, he was dealt another personal tragedy when his younger brother passed suddenly at the age of 20.

After his hockey playing career ended in 1980 he studied Martial arts. Marson became a seventh degree black belt in the Japanese style of Shotokan, attaining the status of Master-Shihan. Marson has developed an off-ice martial arts training program for hockey players designed to improve timing, focus and confidence. Former NHL player Rick Nash was a student of the program.

== Career statistics ==
=== Regular season and playoffs ===
			Regular season					Playoffs
Season	Team	League	GP	G	A	Pts	PIM	GP	G	A	Pts	PIM
1971–72	Chatham Junior Maroons	SOHL	—	—	—	—	—	—	—	—	—	—
1972–73	Sudbury Wolves	OHA	57	12	21	33	117	4	1	0	1	2
1973–74	Sudbury Wolves	OHA	69	35	59	94	146	4	1	0	1	0
1974–75	Washington Capitals	NHL	76	16	12	28	59	—	—	—	—	—
1975–76	Washington Capitals	NHL	57	4	7	11	50	—	—	—	—	—
1975–76	Baltimore Clippers	AHL	12	1	3	4	16	—	—	—	—	—
1976–77	Washington Capitals	NHL	10	0	1	1	18	—	—	—	—	—
1976–77	Springfield Indians	AHL	66	15	17	32	81	—	—	—	—	—
1977–78	Washington Capitals	NHL	46	4	4	8	101	—	—	—	—	—
1977–78	Hershey Bears	AHL	20	5	3	8	35	—	—	—	—	—
1978–79	Washington Capitals	NHL	4	0	0	0	0	—	—	—	—	—
1978–79	Philadelphia Firebirds	AHL	6	3	2	5	19	—	—	—	—	—
1978–79	Binghamton Dusters	AHL	68	12	11	23	132	10	4	3	7	20
1979–80	Los Angeles Kings	NHL	3	0	0	0	5	—	—	—	—	—
1979–80	Binghamton Dusters	AHL	58	7	8	15	85	—	—	—	—	—
AHL totals			230	43	44	87	368	10	4	3	7	20
NHL totals			196	24	24	48	233	—	—	—	—	—

== See also ==
- List of black NHL players
