= New Haven Nutmegs (ice hockey) =

- City: New Haven, Connecticut
- League: Eastern Amateur Hockey League (EAHL)
- Operated: 1951–1953
- Home arena: New Haven Arena
- Colors: Red, white

Franchise history
- 1951–1952: New Haven Tomahawks
- 1952–1953: New Haven Nutmegs

The New Haven Nutmegs were an American professional ice hockey team based in New Haven, Connecticut.

== History ==
=== New Haven Tomahawks ===
The New Haven Tomahawks joined the Eastern Hockey League as one of four expansion teams for the 1951-52 season. Morden "Ducky" Skinner, who had spent three years coaching the San Diego Padres in the Pacific Coast Hockey League, took charge behind the bench. The Tomahawks' first-ever game took place in Troy, New York, on November 4, 1951, against the New York Rovers.

The Tomahawks' single season in the league saw them win 37 of 66 contests and make it to the EHL Finals, where the Johnstown Jets eliminated them in five games.

The New Haven Tomahawks helped introduce ice hockey to North Carolina on April 18, 1952, when they faced the Boston Olympics in a 5-5 tie at Raleigh's Reynolds Coliseum, drawing an estimated 3,000 people to the state's first hockey game.

=== New Haven Nutmegs ===
For the second season, the team was renamed 'Nutmegs' after Connecticut, the nutmeg state. The rebranding didn't help their attendance figures, but more likely, the main culprit was their fall in the standings. Though the team finished with a losing record, they still managed to make the playoffs. Unfortunately, that was not enough to continue the franchise, and the team was disbanded after the '53 season.

== Season-by-season record ==
Note: GP = Games played, W = Wins, L = Losses, T = Ties, Pts = Points, GF = Goals for, GA = Goals against

EHL Season	GP	W	L	T	Pts	GF	GA	Finish	Coach	Playoffs
1951–52	66	37	27	2	76	256	241	2nd in Northern	Morden "Ducky" Skinner	Lost in Finals
1952–53	60	28	31	1	57	251	223	3rd	Tony Hemmerling	Lost in Semifinals
