= Willie O'Ree =

Canadian ice hockey player (born 1935)

CM ONB Willie O'Ree
- Hockey Hall of Fame, 2018 (Builder)
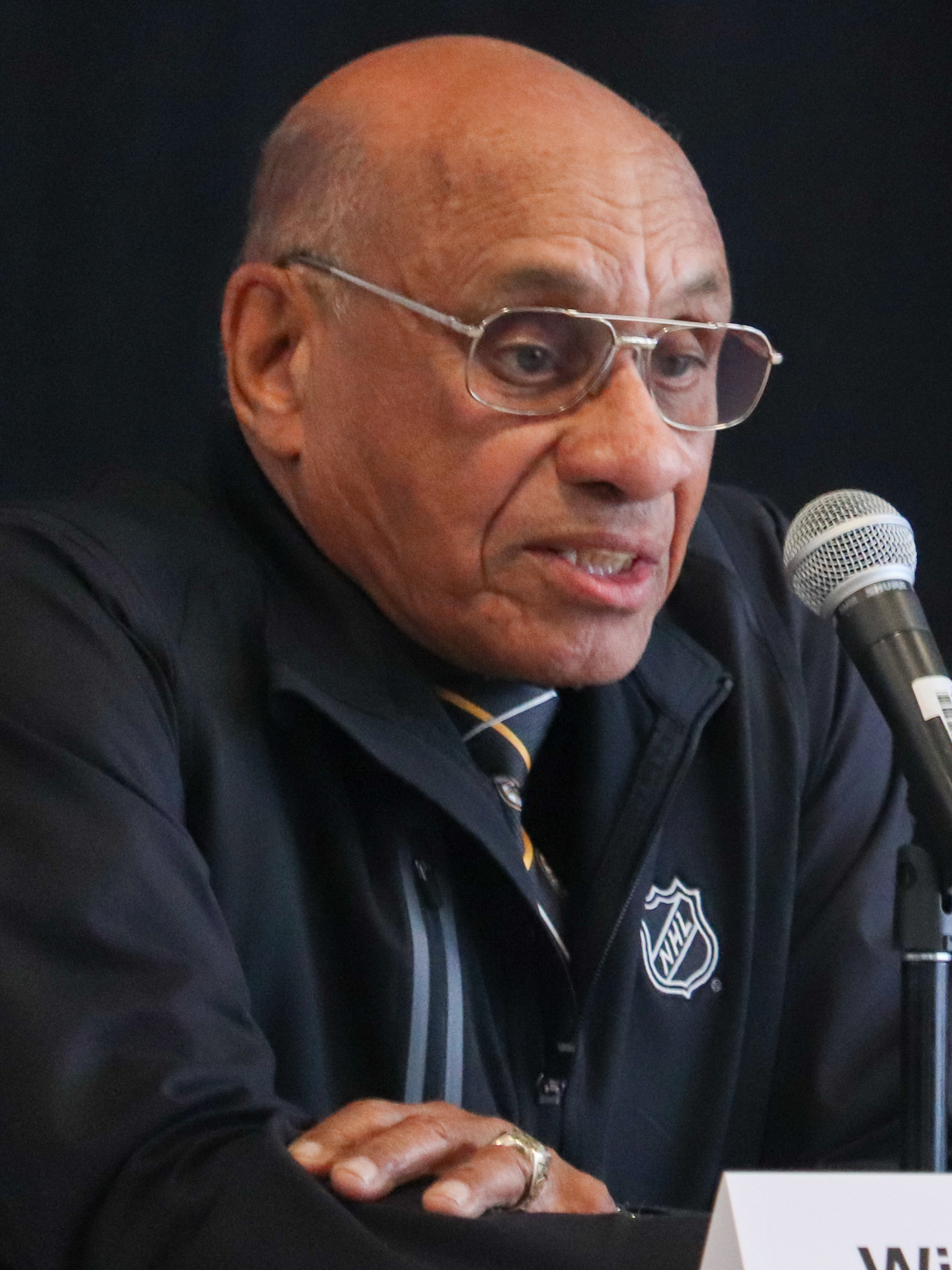
- O'Ree in 2020
- Born: October 15, 1935 (age 91) Fredericton, New Brunswick, Canada
- Height: 5 ft 10 in (178 cm)
- Weight: 175 lb (79 kg; 12 st 7 lb)
- Position: Winger
- Shot: Left
- Played for: Boston Bruins
- Playing career: 1958–1979

William Eldon O'Ree CM ONB (born October 15, 1935) is a Canadian former professional ice hockey player from Fredericton, New Brunswick. He is widely recognized for being the first black player in the National Hockey League (NHL), playing as a winger for the Boston Bruins. His accomplishment of breaking the colour barrier in the NHL has led him to sometimes be referred to as the "Jackie Robinson of hockey," whom he had the chance to meet when he was younger. In 2018, O'Ree was inducted into the Hockey Hall of Fame, and starting that year the NHL has introduced the annual Willie O'Ree Community Hero Award in his honour.

== Early life and career ==
William Eldon O'Ree was born on October 15, 1935, in Fredericton, New Brunswick, to Harry, a civil engineer and road maintenance worker, and Rosebud O'Ree. He was the youngest of nine siblings. His grandparents were escapees of slavery in the United States, moving to Canada through the Underground Railroad. Fredericton had a small black population during O'Ree's early years, with only two families living in the city at the time.

O'Ree began skating at the age of three and started playing organized hockey at the age of five. O'Ree regularly used the family's backyard rink to play the game, and when the weather allowed, he would skate to school. In the early rinks, skin colour was never a problem, as O'Ree wrote in his autobiography, The Willie O’Ree Story: Hockey’s Black Pioneer.

When O'Ree was 14 years old, he was taught how to bodycheck by his older brother Richard, with whom he played organized hockey. O'Ree also played baseball during this time for Fredericton's West Enders team, where in October 1950 he received an outstanding player trophy. O'Ree was predicted by The Daily Gleaner sportswriter Jack Riley to have the potential to become "another Don Newcombe, Sam Jethroe, or Jackie Robinson" in the future. At this age, O'Ree also met Robinson. At the age of 15, O'Ree participated in the New Brunswick Amateur Hockey Association playoffs as a part of the Fredericton Falcons. He later played for the Fredericton Capitals and attended Fredericton High School, but was deemed potentially ineligible to play hockey for the school because of a New Brunswick Interscholastic Athletic Association (NBIAA) rule forbidding players who already have a history playing intermediate or senior sports from playing on the interscholastic level.

== Playing career ==
O'Ree first began playing hockey out-of-province after being signed to the Quebec Frontenacs of the Quebec Junior Hockey League in September 1954. O'Ree played junior hockey for several teams in Quebec and Ontario before being signed by the Quebec Aces of the Quebec Hockey League (QHL) in 1955. Midway through his second minor-league season with the Quebec Aces, O'Ree was called up to the Boston Bruins of the NHL to replace Leo Labine, who was unable to play due to an illness. Two years earlier, O'Ree had been blinded when he was hit in his right eye by an errant puck; this would have precluded him from playing in the NHL if the Bruins had known. However, O'Ree managed to keep it secret, and made his NHL debut with the Bruins on January 18, 1958, against the Montreal Canadiens, becoming the first black player in league history. He played two games that year, with centre man Don McKenney and right wing Jerry Toppazzini as his linemates. O'Ree played 43 games for the Bruins during the 1960–61 NHL season. An incident occurred during a game from that season against the Chicago Blackhawks in Chicago Stadium. According to O'Ree, he was called racist names by several of the Blackhawks players. During the game, Eric Nesterenko butt-ended O'Ree, knocking out his two front teeth and breaking his nose. O'Ree responded by hitting Nesterenko over the head with his stick, which O'Ree said "almost created a riot." O'Ree remembered that fans called him racist names and that the Blackhawks players were threatening to kill him, and he stated that he was "lucky to get out of the arena alive." After the 1960–61 season, O'Ree was traded to the Montreal Canadiens. O'Ree described that the Canadiens were run by racists and that he wasn't invited to try out for the team, but was sent to a minor league team in Hull, Quebec. O'Ree scored 4 goals and 10 assists in his NHL career, all in 1961.

O'Ree faced racial taunts throughout his hockey career, including in the NHL, especially in the United States. He noted that racist remarks were much worse in the U.S. cities than in Toronto and Montreal, the two Canadian cities hosting NHL teams at the time, and that "Fans would yell, 'Go back to the South' and 'How come you're not picking cotton?' Things like that. It didn't bother me. I just wanted to be a hockey player, and if they couldn't accept that fact, then that was their problem, not mine."

In the minor leagues, O'Ree won two scoring titles in the Western Hockey League (WHL) between 1961 and 1974, scoring 30 or more goals 4 times, with a high of 38 in 1964–65 and 1968–69. O'Ree played 50 games for the American Hockey League's New Haven Nighthawks in 1972–73. Most of O'Ree's playing time was with the WHL's Los Angeles Blades and San Diego Gulls. The latter team retired his number, which now hangs from the rafters at Pechanga Arena, formerly known as the San Diego Sports Arena. O'Ree continued to play in the minors until the age of 43.

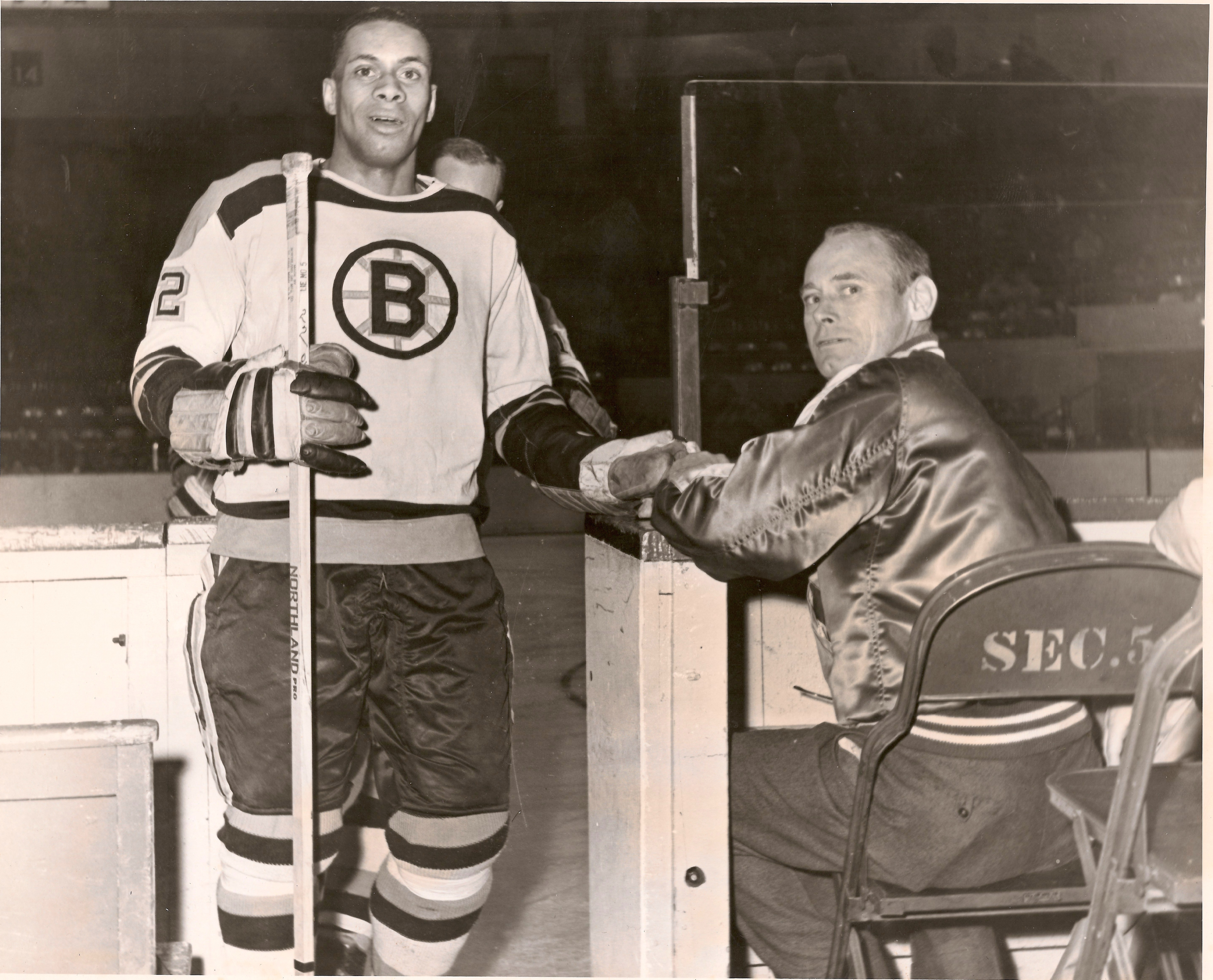
Willie O'Ree of the Boston Bruins and Detroit Red Wings trainer Len "Johny" Fletcher, 1961

== Impact on hockey ==
After O'Ree's stint in the NHL, there were no other black players in the NHL until another Canadian player, Mike Marson, was drafted by the Washington Capitals in 1974. There were 23 black players in the NHL as of the mid-2010s. Art Dorrington was the first black player to sign an NHL contract, in 1950 with the New York Rangers organisation, but never played beyond the minor league level. NHL players are now required to enroll in a preseason diversity training seminar, and racially based verbal abuse is punished through suspensions and fines. O'Ree is sometimes referred to as the "Jackie Robinson of hockey" for breaking the colour barrier in hockey.

Since 1998, O'Ree has been the NHL's Diversity Ambassador, traveling across North America to schools and hockey programs to promote messages of inclusion, dedication, and confidence.

Starting in the 2017–18 season, the NHL has instituted the annual Willie O'Ree Community Hero Award to recognize "an individual who - through the game of hockey - has positively impacted his or her community, culture or society". It is awarded through public voting.

== Personal life ==
O'Ree moved to California in the United States, where he married and had two sons. They divorced and O'Ree later married Deljeet Kaur Manak O'Ree, with whom he has a daughter. He currently lives in La Mesa, California, where he first moved in 1967 to play for the San Diego Gulls.

== Accomplishments ==
O'Ree was inducted into the New Brunswick Sports Hall of Fame in March 1984. In 1998, O'Ree was working at the Hotel del Coronado near San Diego, California, when the National Hockey League approached him to be the director of youth development for its diversity task force. The NHL/USA Hockey Diversity Task Force is a non-profit program for minority youth that encourages them to learn and play hockey. O'Ree and Kevin Weekes appeared in the Everybody Hates Chris episode "Everybody Hates Gretzky" in 2008.

On the afternoon of January 19, 2008, the Bruins and NHL deputy commissioner Bill Daly honoured O'Ree at TD Garden in Boston to mark the 50th anniversary of his NHL debut. In addition, The Sports Museum of New England located in the TD Garden, established a special exhibit on O'Ree's career, comprising many items on loan from his collection. Those in attendance included a busload of friends from O'Ree's hometown of Fredericton. Two days earlier, the City of Fredericton honoured him by naming a new sports complex on the North side after him. Around the time of the 60th anniversary of O'Ree's contribution to ice hockey in early 2008, he was once again honoured by the Bruins and the NHL, with a new street hockey rink in Boston named in his honour, one of many accolades with which the Bruins and NHL legend are involved. On January 27, 2008, the NHL also honoured O'Ree during the 56th National Hockey League All-Star Game in Atlanta, Georgia. On February 5, 2008, ESPN did a special on him in honour of Black History Month. On October 29, 2008, San Diego State University presented O'Ree with an Award for Outstanding Commitment to Diversity and Cross Cultural Understanding. In 2008, O'Ree was also inducted by the San Diego Hall of Champions into the Breitbard Hall of Fame honouring San Diego's finest athletes both on and off the playing surface.

The same year, O'Ree received the Order of Canada, the highest civilian award for a Canadian citizen. He was honoured as a pioneer of hockey and a dedicated youth mentor in Canada along with the U.S. On June 28, 2011, The Sports Museum at TD Garden in Boston honoured O'Ree with the Hockey Legacy Award at the 10th Annual "The Tradition." Other honourees that evening included Larry Bird, Mike Lowell, and Ty Law. The Buffalo Sabres hosted a Willie O'Ree skills weekend in March 2012. His jersey was retired by the San Diego Gulls on October 16, 2015.

As the 2016 Stanley Cup Finals were about to start, the San Jose Sharks' Barbadian Canadian star right winger Joel Ward was preparing to play against the Pittsburgh Penguins, and told ESPN that O'Ree was one of his inspirations to play pro hockey, and should have his player number 22 retired by the NHL league-wide, just as Jackie Robinson, the first player of colour in Major League Baseball, has been honoured. Ward himself honoured Robinson's legacy through his last season in NHL play by wearing jersey number 42 in NHL play; Robinson's player number 42 has been retired league-wide in pro baseball.

On November 3, 2017, O'Ree was honoured with a banner by the Springfield Thunderbirds during a pregame ceremony to commemorate his time with the Springfield Indians.

A more personal honour for O'Ree was arranged by John Grzelcyk, father of former Bruins defenseman Matt Grzelcyk. A long-time member of the Boston Garden and TD Garden "bull-gang" team of arena personnel that assists with "changeovers" for different events at each facility, the senior Grzelcyk had saved an original number 22 Bruins uniform jersey worn by O'Ree from the 1960–61 Boston Bruins season, when O'Ree last played in the NHL as a Bruin. Both Grzelcyks personally presented the jersey to O'Ree, to honour him for his time with the Bruins and the NHL. At about the same time as O'Ree received his vintage Bruins game-sweater, it became known that Madison Bowey, a then-Washington Capitals rookie of bi-racial ethnicity, had been taught by his Black Canadian father about O'Ree's importance in NHL history, and selected 22 as his number with the Capitals to honour O'Ree's achievement.

On June 26, 2018, it was announced that O'Ree would be inducted as a builder into the Hockey Hall of Fame later that year.

Almost ten months after receiving his original Bruins sweater from the Grzelcyks, on November 1, 2018, O'Ree attended the ceremonial dedication of a street hockey rink named in his honour in the Boston neighbourhood of Allston, as part of the continuing legacy of O'Ree's time with the Bruins.

By early May 2019, following O'Ree's builder honour with the Hockey Hall of Fame the previous year, a bill was introduced in the 116th U.S. Congress authorising the award of the United States Congressional Gold Medal for O'Ree's achievements "in recognition of his contributions and commitment to hockey, inclusion, and recreational opportunity."

In 2019, O'Ree and the campaign to get him inducted into the Hockey Hall of Fame were profiled in Willie, a documentary film by Laurence Mathieu-Léger.

O'Ree was named to Canada's Sports Hall of Fame on May 27, 2020, in the Builder category. The formal induction ceremony was postponed to October 3, 2021, due to concerns over COVID-19.

On January 12, 2021, the Boston Bruins announced that they would retire O'Ree's number 22 on February 18. However, the jersey retirement ceremony was moved to January 18, 2022, by the NHL.

In 2021, as a celebration of Black History Month, all NHL players wore a commemorative helmet decal honouring O'Ree from January 16 to February 28.

In 2022, US President Joe Biden signed the Willie O'Ree Congressional Gold Medal Act. The bill awarded O'Ree a Congressional Gold Medal, the U.S. Congress' highest honour, for his contributions to "hockey, inclusion and recreational opportunity." O'Ree is the first player in NHL history to receive the honour.

Canada Post released a commemorative postage stamp on October 30, 2023, honouring Willie O'Ree.

== Awards and honours ==
- WHL Second All-Star Team (1969)
- New Brunswick Sports Hall of Fame (1984)
- Lester Patrick Trophy (2003)
- Order of New Brunswick (2005)
- Willie O'Ree Place (Fredericton arena, dedicated 2008)
- Order of Canada (2008)
- Breitbard Hall of Fame (2008)
- Hockey Hall of Fame (2018)
- Congressional Gold Medal (2019)
- Canada's Sports Hall of Fame (2020–21)
- His #22 jersey number was retired by the Boston Bruins on January 18, 2022.
- Named One of the Top 100 Best Bruins Players of all Time.

== Career statistics ==
=== Regular season and playoffs ===
			Regular season					Playoffs
Season	Team	League	GP	G	A	Pts	PIM	GP	G	A	Pts	PIM
1950–51	Fredericton Falcons	NBAHA	—	—	—	—	—	2	0	0	0	4
1951–52	Fredericton Merchants	YCHL	6	10	4	14	2	8	10	5	15	18
1951–52	Fredericton Jr. Capitals	NBJHL	3	2	0	2	0	—	—	—	—	—
1952–53	Fredericton Jr. Capitals	NBJHL	12	15	3	18	6	4	5	0	5	2
1952–53	Fredericton Capitals	NBSHL	2	2	0	2	0	—	—	—	—	—
1953–54	Fredericton Capitals	NBSHL	23	7	11	18	15	25	15	10	25	10
1954–55	Quebec Frontenacs	QJHL	43	27	17	44	41	17	7	6	13	10
1955–56	Kitchener Canucks	OHA	41	30	28	58	38	8	4	3	7	6
1956–57	Quebec Aces	QHL	68	22	12	34	80	15	3	3	6	10
1957–58	Boston Bruins	NHL	2	0	0	0	0	—	—	—	—	—
1957–58	Springfield Indians	AHL	6	0	0	0	0	—	—	—	—	—
1957–58	Quebec Aces	QHL	57	13	19	32	43	9	4	2	6	8
1958–59	Quebec Aces	QHL	56	9	21	30	74	—	—	—	—	—
1959–60	Kingston Frontenacs	EPHL	50	21	25	46	41	—	—	—	—	—
1960–61	Boston Bruins	NHL	43	4	10	14	26	—	—	—	—	—
1960–61	Hull-Ottawa Canadiens	EPHL	16	10	9	19	21	—	—	—	—	—
1961–62	Hull-Ottawa Canadiens	EPHL	12	1	2	3	18	—	—	—	—	—
1961–62	Los Angeles Blades	WHL	54	28	26	54	57	—	—	—	—	—
1962–63	Los Angeles Blades	WHL	64	25	26	51	41	3	2	3	5	2
1963–64	Los Angeles Blades	WHL	60	17	18	35	45	12	4	8	12	10
1964–65	Los Angeles Blades	WHL	70	38	21	59	75	—	—	—	—	—
1965–66	Los Angeles Blades	WHL	62	33	33	66	30	—	—	—	—	—
1966–67	Los Angeles Blades	WHL	68	34	26	60	58	—	—	—	—	—
1967–68	San Diego Gulls	WHL	66	21	33	54	54	7	2	2	4	6
1968–69	San Diego Gulls	WHL	70	38	41	79	63	7	3	3	6	12
1969–70	San Diego Gulls	WHL	66	0	0	69	50	6	6	3	9	4
1970–71	San Diego Gulls	WHL	66	18	15	33	47	6	4	1	5	14
1971–72	San Diego Gulls	WHL	48	16	17	33	42	4	0	1	1	2
1972–73	New Haven Nighthawks	AHL	50	21	24	45	41	—	—	—	—	—
1972–73	San Diego Gulls	WHL	18	6	5	11	18	6	1	4	5	2
1973–74	San Diego Gulls	WHL	73	30	28	58	89	4	3	3	6	0
1974–75	San Diego Charms	SoCal-Sr.	—	—	—	—	—	—	—	—	—	—
1975–76	San Diego Charms	SoCal-Sr.	—	—	—	—	—	—	—	—	—	—
1978–79	San Diego Hawks	PHL	53	21	25	46	37	—	—	—	—	—
WHL totals			785	328	311	639	669	55	25	28	53	52
NHL totals			45	4	10	14	26	—	—	—	—	—

== See also ==
- List of sports desegregation firsts
- Black players in ice hockey
- Race and ethnicity in the NHL
- Art Dorrington, the first Black player to sign an NHL contract, in 1950, with a minor league team in the New York Rangers organization
- John Utendale, the first Black player to sign an NHL contract directly with an NHL team (the Detroit Red Wings), in 1955, although only played for their minor league team and did not get to play in an NHL game
