= Herb Carnegie =

Canadian ice hockey player (1919–2012)

CM OOnt OMC Herb Carnegie
- Hockey Hall of Fame, 2022 (Builder)
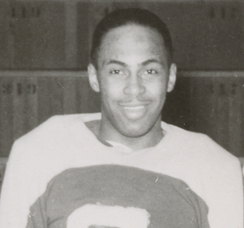
- Born: November 8, 1919 Toronto, Ontario, Canada
- Died: March 9, 2012 (aged 92) Toronto, Ontario, Canada
- Position: Centre
- Shot: Left
- Played for: Quebec Aces; Shawinigan Cataractes; Sherbrooke Randies; Sherbrooke St. Francis
- Playing career: 1944–1954

Herbert Henry Carnegie CM OOnt OMC (November 8, 1919 – March 9, 2012) was a Canadian ice hockey player of Jamaican descent. After his playing career was over, he became a successful businessman, working in the investment industry. In 1954, he founded one of Canada's first hockey schools, Future Aces, and in reflection of his lifetime work in training young hockey players was recognized as a Companion of the Order of Canada, his country's highest civilian honour. He was also inducted as a member of the Order of Ontario in his home province. In Canada's sport community he was recognized as an inductee into Canada's Sports Hall of Fame in 2001, the Ontario Sports Hall of Fame in 2014, and the Hockey Hall of Fame in 2022.

== Playing career ==
Carnegie's hockey career began in 1938 with the Toronto Young Rangers and continued in the early 1940s with the Timmins Buffalo-Ankerite Bisons, a team that played in mining towns in northern Ontario and Quebec. From 1944–45 to 1947-48 he played for Shawinigan and Sherbrooke of the semi-professional Quebec Provincial League and was named most valuable player in 1946, 1947 and 1949. During those years with the Bisons and in Quebec, he played alongside his brother Ossie.

In 1948, Carnegie was given a tryout with the New York Rangers and offered a contract worth $2,700 to play in the Rangers' minor league system. However, he was offered less money than he was earning in the Quebec league and turned down all three offers made by the Rangers organization during his tryout.

Returning to Canada to play in the Quebec Senior Hockey League, he played for Sherbrooke St. Francis and the Quebec Aces before moving to Ontario to play a single season with the Owen Sound Mercuries of the Ontario Senior Hockey Association. During his years in the Quebec Senior League, Carnegie played with future Montreal Canadiens star Jean Beliveau and was coached by Punch Imlach.

=== Facing racism ===
As a black man playing hockey in the 1940s and 1950s, Carnegie endured his share of racism. In one notorious 1938 incident, Conn Smythe, the owner of the Toronto Maple Leafs, is alleged to have commented to the effect that he would accept Carnegie onto the team if he were white, or that he would pay $10,000 to anyone who could turn Carnegie white.

== Retirement ==
After retiring from the game of hockey in 1953, Carnegie started the Future Aces Hockey School, one of the first hockey schools in Canada. In 1954, he wrote the "Future Aces Creed" in an attempt to foster respect, tolerance, diversity and sportsmanship among young people.

Carnegie also continued his athletic career as a golfer, winning the Canadian Seniors Golf Championship in 1977 and 1978, and the Ontario Senior Golf Championship in 1975, 1976 and 1982.

In 1987, he established the Herbert H. Carnegie Future Aces Foundation to provide bursaries for college and university. Carnegie also had a successful business career as a financial planner with the Investors Group.

In 1996, he published his biography, A Fly in a Pail of Milk: The Herb Carnegie Story (Mosaic Press, 1996).

Carnegie was named to the Order of Ontario in 1996 and the Order of Canada in 2003. On May 2, 2005, the North York Centennial Centre was renamed the Herbert H. Carnegie Centennial Centre in his honour. On June 12, 2006, he received an Honorary Doctor of Laws degree from York University. A public school in York Region is named in his honour.

He also received the Queen's Silver Jubilee Medal in 1977, the Ontario Medal for Good Citizenship in 1988, the Metropolitan Toronto Canada Day Medal in 1990, the 125th Anniversary of the Confederation of Canada Medal in 1992, the Queen's Golden Jubilee Medal in 2002 and the Queen's Diamond Jubilee Medal in 2012.

Carnegie became legally blind. He died in Toronto, Ontario, Canada where he lived in an assisted living home.

== Family life ==
Carnegie last resided in Toronto. He was married to Audrey May Carnegie for 63 years, from 1940 until her death in 2003. They had four children, nine grandchildren and six great-grandchildren. His grandson, Rane Carnegie, is also a hockey player. Rane had a successful junior career with several teams and has played professional hockey since joining the Milwaukee Admirals as part of the postseason roster at the end of the 2005–06 AHL season. Rane Carnegie is now spreading awareness about Herb's story. As of 2022, his daughter, Bernice Carnegie, is a co-owner of the Toronto Six, a professional women's hockey team in the Premier Hockey Federation.

== Appearances in media ==
In the early 1990s, Carnegie and his Future Aces hockey program were featured in two special issues of The Amazing Spider-Man, helping Spider-Man bring down Electro and his hockey puck/drug smuggling operation (issue 1, Skating on Thin Ice) and foil the Chameleon's plan to steal a valuable chemical formula (issue 2). The comics were set in Winnipeg and Fredericton, respectively.

== See also ==
- Carnegie (disambiguation)
- Black players in ice hockey
- Race and ethnicity in the NHL

== Bibliography ==
- Canadian Who’s Who. 2006 edition. Toronto : University of Toronto Press, 2006. ISBN 0-8020-4054-3.
- Harris, Cecil. Breaking the Ice: The Black Experience in Professional Hockey. Toronto: Insomniac Press, 2003. ISBN 1-894663-58-6.
- Who’s Who in Black Canada: Black Success and Black Excellence in Canada: A Contemporary Directory. Toronto : D.P. Williams & Associates, 2002. ISBN 0-9731384-1-6.
- Daniel Cross. Too Colorful For the League. DVD (English). 6 Feb 2001. Canada.
