= Race and ethnicity in the NHL =

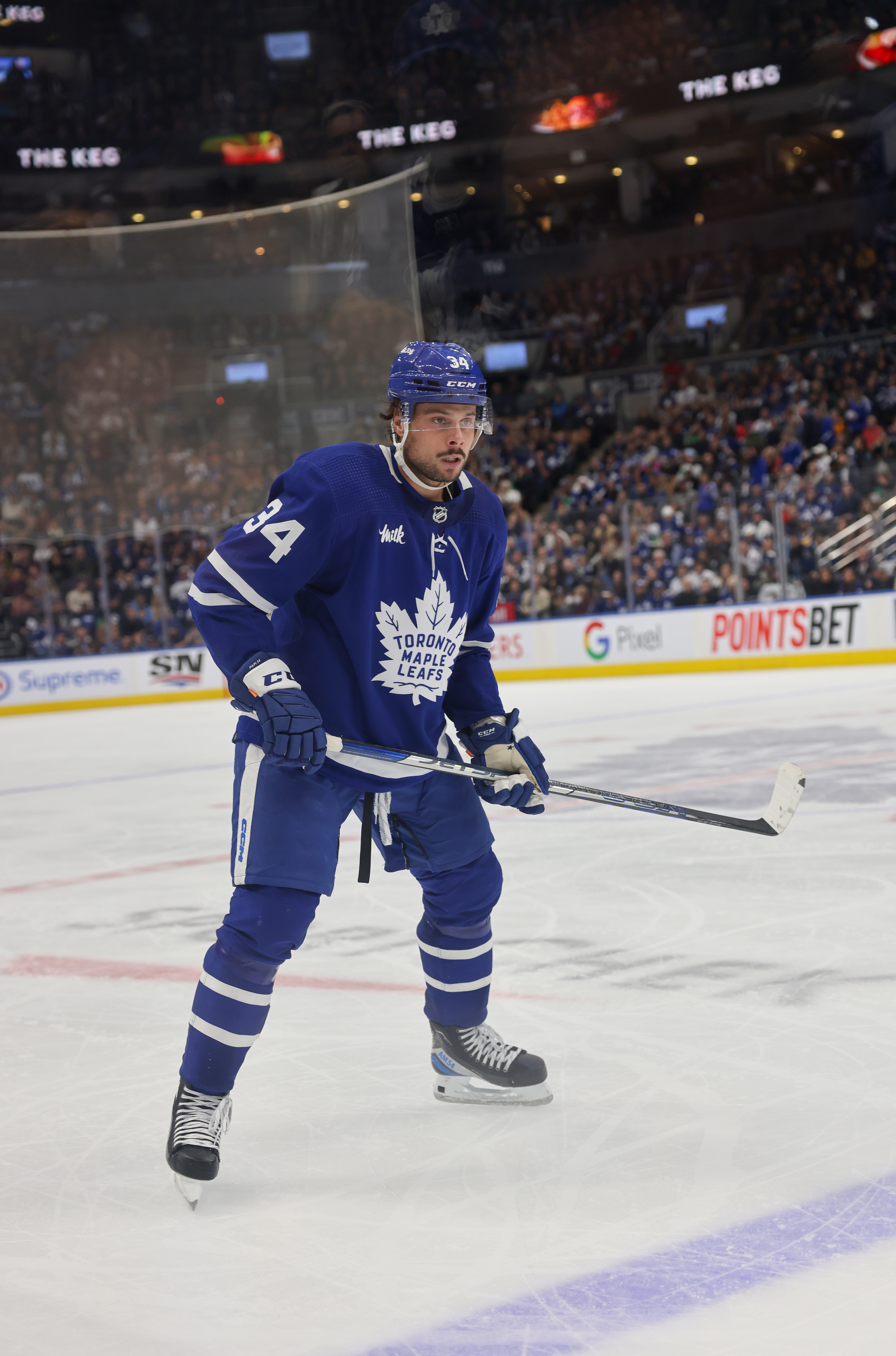
Auston Matthews with the Toronto Maple Leafs in October 2022

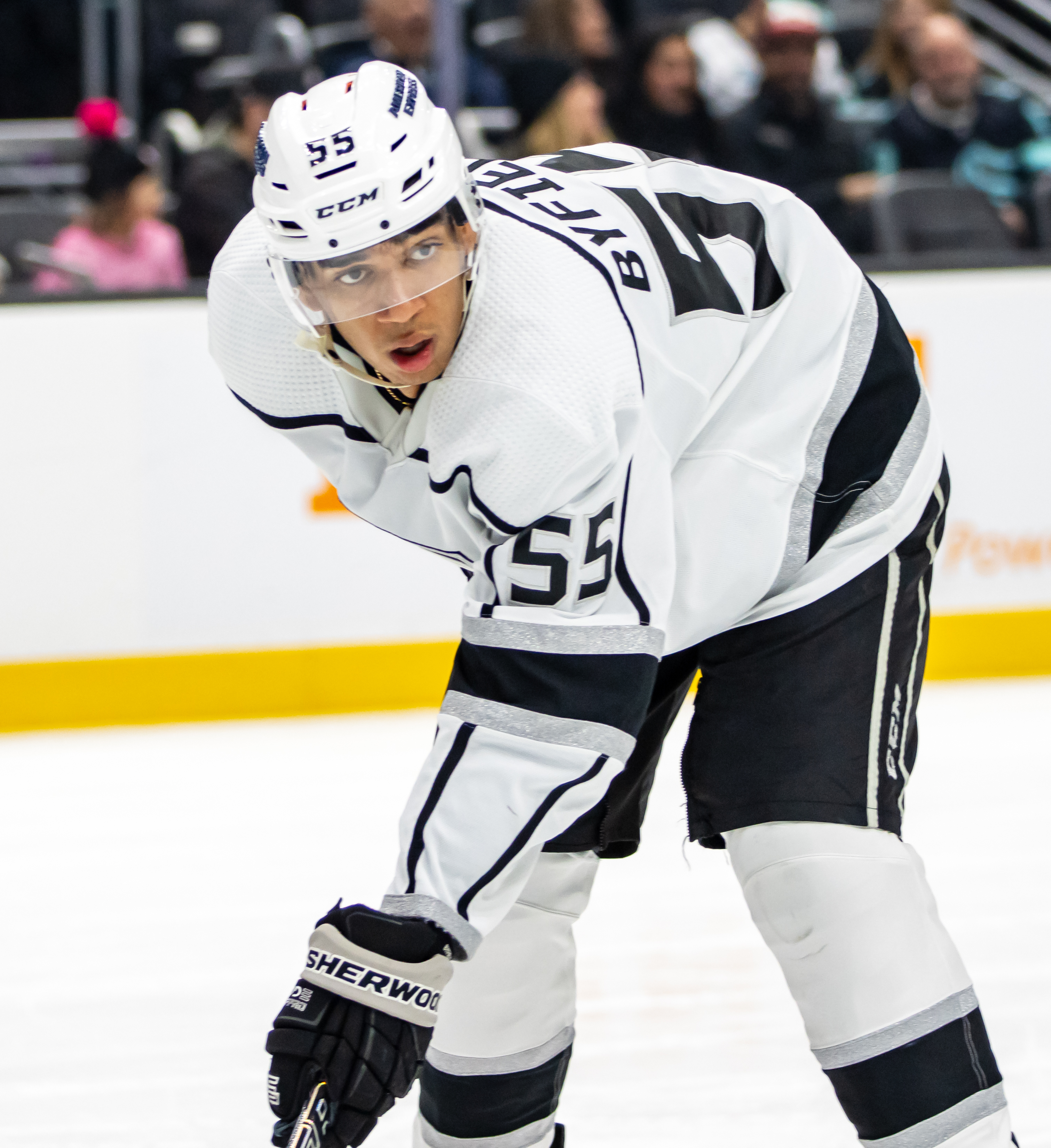
Quinton Byfield with the Los Angeles Kings in 2023

The National Hockey League (NHL) has evolved from a mono-ethnic and primarily Canadian professional athletic league to one that spans North America. The distribution of ethnic groups has been gradually changing since the inception of the NHL. The league consists of players from varying nationalities and diverse backgrounds. The NHL first expanded its representation of player nationalities in the 1970s, with players joining the league from the United States, Sweden, and Finland. The share of Canadians in the league dropped to 75% by the 1980s and was slightly under 50% by 2012.

The first player to break the NHL colour barrier was Indigenous Native American Taffy Abel on November 16, 1926. Larry Kwong became the first Asian to play in the NHL in 1948. In 1958, Willie O'Ree became the first NHL player of African descent. The NHL has made an effort to create a more diverse and inclusive institution. In 2011, 93% of NHL players identified as white, with the remaining 7% identifying as varying ethnicities. In the 2025–26 NHL season, there were between 23 and 26 active black players in the NHL.

== History of representation ==
A number of ice hockey leagues for players of African descent formed in Canada as early as the late-19th century. The Coloured Hockey League was an all-black ice hockey league established in 1895. Operating across the Maritime provinces of Canada, the league operated for several decades until 1930. Other minor ice hockey leagues saw integration in the early 20th century, including the Quebec Senior Hockey League. However, the major league did not. The precursor to the National Hockey League (NHL), the National Hockey Association (NHA), was founded in 1909. The NHL came into existence when the NHA was suspended in 1917.

The first player to break the NHL colour barrier was Indigenous Native American Taffy Abel, when he joined the New York Rangers on November 16, 1926. Abel, who was Ojibwe, was forced to hide his Native American ancestry until 1939 after he retired. He played with the New York Rangers and Chicago Black Hawks between 1926 and 1934. During his career, he was a member of two Stanley Cup championship teams. Abel is also a member of the United States Hockey Hall of Fame. Abel was a silver medalist in ice hockey at the 1924 Winter Olympics and the U.S. flagbearer for those games, making him the first Native American to play, and to win a medal, in the Winter Olympics.

Henry Maracle played eleven games in the NHL with the New York Rangers during the 1930–31 season. A member of the Mohawk tribe, Maracle was the first full-blooded First Nations hockey player in the NHL at the time of his recall to the New York Rangers in March 1931. In 1953, Fred Sasakamoose was the first Cree NHL player, and he became the second Canadian indigenous player in the NHL, debuting with the Chicago Black Hawks.

On March 13, 1948, Larry Kwong became the first Asian to play in the NHL, with the New York Rangers. Born in Vernon, British Columbia, Kwong was a Chinese Canadian of Cantonese descent.

Herb Carnegie was the first black player to play on ice in a professional hockey game. In 1948, Carnegie was given a tryout with the New York Rangers and offered a contract to play in the Rangers' minor league system. However, he was offered less money than what he was earning in the Quebec league and turned down all three offers made by the Rangers organization during his tryout. On January 18, 1958, Willie O'Ree became the first Black Canadian to play in the NHL. Playing with the Boston Bruins, he was also the first NHL player of African descent. Val James was the first African American player to play in the NHL, called up by the Buffalo Sabres in 1982. His stints with the Buffalo Sabres and Toronto Maple Leafs were short-lived and he eventually retired in 1987 due to injury.

In the 1970s, there were zero African American players in the NHL. That number rose to 26 in the 1980s, then to 32 in the 1990s. Though seemingly minute, it was a significant change in the racial demographic of the NHL at the time. The number of black NHL players was 26 by the end of the 20th century and sat at 32 in 2016.

== Racism and discrimination ==
=== Herb Carnegie ===
Herb Carnegie was a Canadian ice hockey player of Jamaican descent. He played for semi-professional teams, including the Toronto Young Rangers in Toronto, as well as teams in northern Ontario and Quebec. He was the first Black player to play on ice in a professional hockey game. In one notorious 1938 incident, Conn Smythe, the owner of the Toronto Maple Leafs, is alleged to have commented to the effect that he would accept Herb Carnegie onto the team if he were white, or that he would pay $10,000 to anyone who could turn Carnegie white.

In 1948, Carnegie became the first known Black player to be given a tryout and offered a contract by an NHL's team's organization (although not directly by an NHL team), when he was given a tryout with the New York Rangers and offered a contract worth $2,700 to play in the Rangers' minor league system. However, he was offered less money than what he was earning in the semi-professional Quebec Provincial League and turned down all three offers made by the Rangers organization during his tryout.

=== John Utendale ===
In 1955, John Utendale became the first Black player to sign a contract directly with an NHL team, the Detroit Red Wings. Utendale practiced with the Red Wings but never played in an NHL game; instead, he played with the Edmonton Flyers, as they were the Red Wings' minor league affiliate. In 2006, Utendale's brother claimed that Red Wings coach Jack Adams had refused to give Utendale any playing time on the Red Wings because Adams objected to his relationship with a white woman whom Utendale later married.

=== Willie O'Ree ===
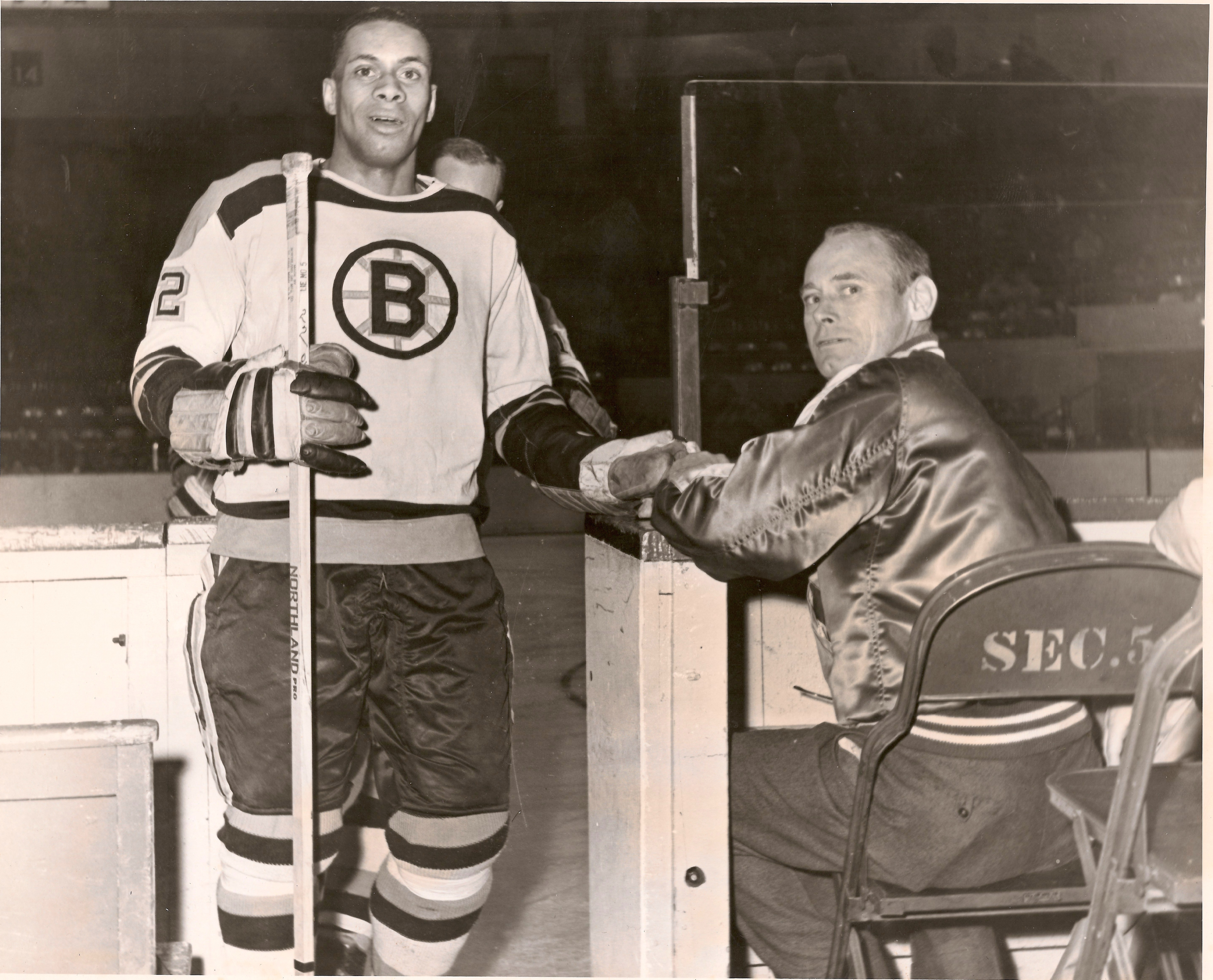
Willie O'Ree of the Boston Bruins and Detroit Red Wings trainer Len "Johny" Fletcher, 1961

During the 1957-58 season, Canadian-born Willie O'Ree became the first player of African descent to play a game in the NHL, making his debut on January 18, 1958 with the Boston Bruins, against the Montreal Canadiens. Playing a short career of only 45 games, O'Ree faced racism after being recalled from the Canadian minor leagues. While in the minor leagues, O'Ree recalls the racism he faced as predominantly muted. However, as soon as O'Ree entered into the NHL, racist remarks and actions by hostile fans and players appeared. While playing in America, O'Ree recalled one racial incident where Chicago Blackhawks forward Eric Nesterenko yelled racial slurs at O'Ree and butt-ended O'Ree with his stick. The event caused fights to break out between all players of each team and a police escort was required for O'Ree to leave the building safely. O'Ree has stated that racism had not affected him in his playing career. In addition, any racial slurs, according to him, "would go in one ear, and out the other." O'Ree cites his brother as his main inspiration to become the first black player. He found that if the fans were against him playing because of his skin color, he may as well ignore it and focus on what he does best. This motivation led Willie O'Ree to be named the "Jackie Robinson" of ice hockey by the NHL community.

When O'Ree first entered the league as the first ice hockey player of African descent, he received no recognition from the league or the media. The media did not publish any articles that the color line in ice hockey had been broken. Some newspapers who reported about the first game O'Ree played confused O'Ree's first name Willie, as Billy. O'Ree himself noted, "It didn't really dawn on me then," that he had broken the color barrier in professional ice hockey. When Val James first entered the league in 1981, the NHL did not make any recognition of him being the first African American in the NHL.

O'Ree currently serves as the NHL Diversity Ambassador and is involved in hosting various programs at local ice arenas. These programs include learn-to-skate clinics as well as youth ice hockey development clinics for children of multi-ethnic backgrounds.

=== Val James ===
Val James, the first U.S.-born African American hockey player was called up by the Buffalo Sabres in 1982. He refrained from openly discussing his experiences with racism in the league until three decades after retiring from the sport. James's short career was spent with the Toronto Maple Leafs and the Buffalo Sabres. James recalls fans taunting him with racial slurs as well as players committing penalties and fights against him because of his skin color. The depth of his ordeal was so profound that he reported being unable to watch hockey for a full decade without being haunted by memories of discrimination in the league.

"When I started skating, I set out to be a hockey player, not a black hockey player," he wrote. "However, the two concepts quickly became intertwined. And not by choice. From early on, there were some people who were determined to prove that being black and being a hockey player were mutually exclusive."

James found the most intensive racism to be in the United States. During his career with the Buffalo Sabres, Val James recalls beer bottles being thrown at him when entering the arena as well as fans shouting racial slurs at him. Further insights into James's life and experiences can be found in the autobiography Black Ice: The Val James Story, authored by James himself and John Gallagher.

=== Modern day ===
Modern-day racial incidents in the NHL come in many different forms; however, the most prominent are player and spectator interactions. According to an interview with Washington Capitals forward Devante Smith-Pelly, "As a Black hockey player, he [Smith-Pelly] knew exactly what they meant by, 'Basketball, basketball, basketball!'" In this case, the spectators were taunting Smith-Pelly that he is better suited to play basketball, since the majority of players in the National Basketball Association (NBA) are African American. Smith-Pelly states that this incident was "just ignorant people being ignorant."

Many other racist incidents during games have also occurred. During a preseason game, while playing for the Philadelphia Flyers, Wayne Simmonds had a banana thrown at him by a fan. Simmonds' response to this event was very similar to Smith-Pelly's. He believed that a strong example should be set by including a zero-tolerance policy in the NHL. With this policy enacted, any racist remarks or gestures would cause an immediate ejection from the arena and a subsequent ban from attending that organization's games.

In December 2025, at a game between the Dallas Stars and the Toronto Maple Leafs, several Stars fans seated in a group in the upper deck of the American Airlines Center repeatedly stood and made Nazi salutes after the Stars scored goals. The fans' behavior was captured on video, but it did not go viral or attract press attention until the following March. The Stars subsequently tracked down the fan who had purchased the block of tickets for the group and banned him indefinitely from the American Airlines Center for violating their Fan Code of Conduct.

== Player activism ==
=== Black Lives Matter ===
Several NHL players took action in solidarity with the Black Lives Matter movement during the 2010s and 2020s.

On September 28, 2017, before a preseason season game versus the Florida Panthers, J. T. Brown of the Tampa Bay Lightning raised his fist during the U.S. national anthem, in an attempt to "bring awareness to police brutality and inequality for minorities." He did the same on an October 7 game also against the Panthers, becoming the first NHL player to protest during the anthem in a regular season game. He stated that he had "received death threats" after the protest. In the week following, he and a few teammates met with members of the Tampa Police Department after receiving an invitation from the interim police chief. On October 18, Brown announced that he would no longer raise a fist during the anthem, but would continue to work to bring awareness around issues of police brutality and other racial inequalities and injustices.

After the murder of George Floyd in May of 2020, NHL players formed the Hockey Diversity Alliance.

Ryan Reaves, who was one of only two Black players on the roster for the Vegas Golden Knights, organized his team in a demonstration on July 30, 2020. During the national anthem before their exhibition game against the Arizona Coyotes, the players locked arms and bowed their heads. Reaves decided on locking arms because not everyone on the team was comfortable kneeling during the anthem.

On August 1, 2020, Matt Dumba, a Filipino-Canadian member of the Hockey Diversity Alliance, became the first NHL player to kneel during the U.S. national anthem. Though he was a member of the Minnesota Wild, he was not playing that night. While he knelt, two Black players from the teams who were playing placed their hands on his shoulders: Malcolm Subban of the Chicago Blackhawks and Darnell Nurse of the Edmonton Oilers. The three of them remained in this position during both the American and Canadian national anthems. Dumba then gave a speech about racial equality while the screens in the rink displayed the messaged "END RACISM." The action was coordinated with the NHL.

Several days later, on August 3, 2020, Ryan Reaves approached Tyler Seguin of the Dallas Stars before the two teams played each other. He told Seguin that he planned to kneel during the anthem. Seguin agreed to join him. Seguin then told the locker room about what he planned to do, and Jason Dickinson from the Stars volunteered to join him. Reaves, who is Black, and three white players—Seguin, Dickinson, and Knights goalie Robin Lehner—knelt for both the American and Canadian national anthems.

Later that month, the Hockey Diversity Alliance successfully called for the NHL to suspend games following the shooting of Jacob Blake. The NHL postponed their scheduled games for August 27 and 28. These games were part of the 2020 Stanley Cup playoffs.

== Efforts by the NHL to increase inclusion ==
In September 2017, the NHL and the National Hockey League Players' Association (NHLPA), along with 17 other hockey organizations, released the league's Declarations of Principles. The eighth principle reads:

All hockey programs should provide a safe, positive and inclusive environment for players and families regardless of race, color, religion, national origin, gender, age, disability, sexual orientation and socio-economic status. Simply put, hockey is for everyone.

This became part of the NHL's "Hockey Is For Everyone" initiative. Soon after, in December 2017, the NHL hired Kim Davis as Executive Vice President of Social Impact, Growth Initiatives & Legislative Affairs, with a particular focus on improving diversity within the league.

In 2019, the NHL designed a Black History Month mobile museum. The mobile museum is a part of the "Hockey is For Everyone" campaign and is aimed to celebrate Black History Month. The mobile museum is also a commemoration of the black players who have played in the NHL. The museum completed an eight-city tour in February, with its final stop being outside the Canadian embassy in Washington, D.C.

NHL commissioner Gary Bettman has supported his players' wishes by including the zero-tolerance policy for racism. According to Gary Bettman, "Even if it's only one incident it is one too many." The NHL has taken increasing action in the past few years against racist events, even banning four fans from the United Center and all future Chicago Blackhawks events. Bettman has also raised awareness of racist incidents around the league by dedicating the month of February to "Hockey is for Everyone Month". The event starts on February 1, the same date as Black History Month, and has the goal of raising awareness of equality throughout the league. Players tape their sticks with pride tape that represents awareness of equality, respect, and inclusion. In addition, many different programs take place across the nation to include players with disabilities. The event is also promoted through social media with the hashtag #HockeyIsForEveryone.

Although the NHL has taken strong actions against racism in the league, players still believe there is a large issue at hand. Most players, including Smith-Pelly and Evander Kane of the Edmonton Oilers, believe that the NHL has still a long way to go. In their words, race as an issue in the NHL will continue to exist, due to similar incidents occurring in the NHL both sixty years ago and today. O'Ree has a hopeful outlook for the future of ice hockey's diversity. He has stated, "There's more kids of colour playing hockey today than ever before, and more girls." Furthermore, many players are optimistic that the NHL community has gathered around to protect its players from racist incidents.

Speaking about how to increase inclusion of Black players in the NHL, Kim Davis said in 2020:

And our particular situation in our sport is different [than in the NFL], because we don’t necessarily currently have a pipeline of black and brown coaches within our system that we can point to. So our issues are more fundamental. How do we source and identify in the youth hockey system, as well as players who retire who want to be coaches—how do we create and formalize development programs and mentoring programs to create that pipeline of talent?

In 2020, the NHL and NHL Coaches’ Association developed the NHLCA BIPOC Coaches Program, a BIPOC coaching mentorship program to complement its similar program for women coaches. The first group included 40 coaches.

As of 2026, several teams currently hold Black excellence nights or Black history nights to celebrate Black culture and players.

== Current players ==
=== Demographics ===
The NHL first expanded its representation of player nationalities in the 1970s, with players joining the league from the United States, Sweden, and Finland. The share of Canadians in the league dropped to 75% by the 1980s and was slightly under 50% by 2012.

The NHL does not keep statistics on the percentages of ethnicities in the league. However, outside sources have collected statistics on the number of black players in the NHL as well as the percentage of white players in the NHL. A Sports Illustrated article in 1999 attributed the increase in black NHL players, in part, to significant demographic changes in Canada, the country which supplies the largest share of the league's players: "In 1971 there were only 34,445 blacks in Canada ... 25 years later, after heavy immigration from British Commonwealth nations in the Caribbean, Canada had 573,860 blacks (2% of the population) ...."

In 2011, 93% of NHL players identified as white, with the remaining 7% identifying as varying ethnicities. According to a 2015 article by USA Today, 97% of the NHL was white, while the other 3% was made of different ethnicities. Of the 3% of the remaining ethnicities, twenty-six were black. Twenty of the twenty-six black players are from Canada while six were American. In 2019, the NHL was made up of 47.4% Canadians, 25.4% Americans, 9.0% Swedes, and the rest is made up by Russia, Finland, and a few other nations. In the 2025–26 NHL season, there were between 23 and 26 active black players in the NHL.

=== Black players ===
Notable players of African descent include Dustin Byfuglien, who is of Norwegian, African, and Swedish descent; Kyle Okposo, who is of Nigerian descent; and Joel Ward, whose ancestors are from Barbados.

Quinton Byfield of the Sudbury Wolves of the OHL set a record for being the highest-ever selected black player in the NHL entry draft when he was picked by the Los Angeles Kings at second overall in the 2020 NHL entry draft. The Kings signed Byfield to a three-year, entry-level contract on October 16, 2020.

=== Non-black minorities ===
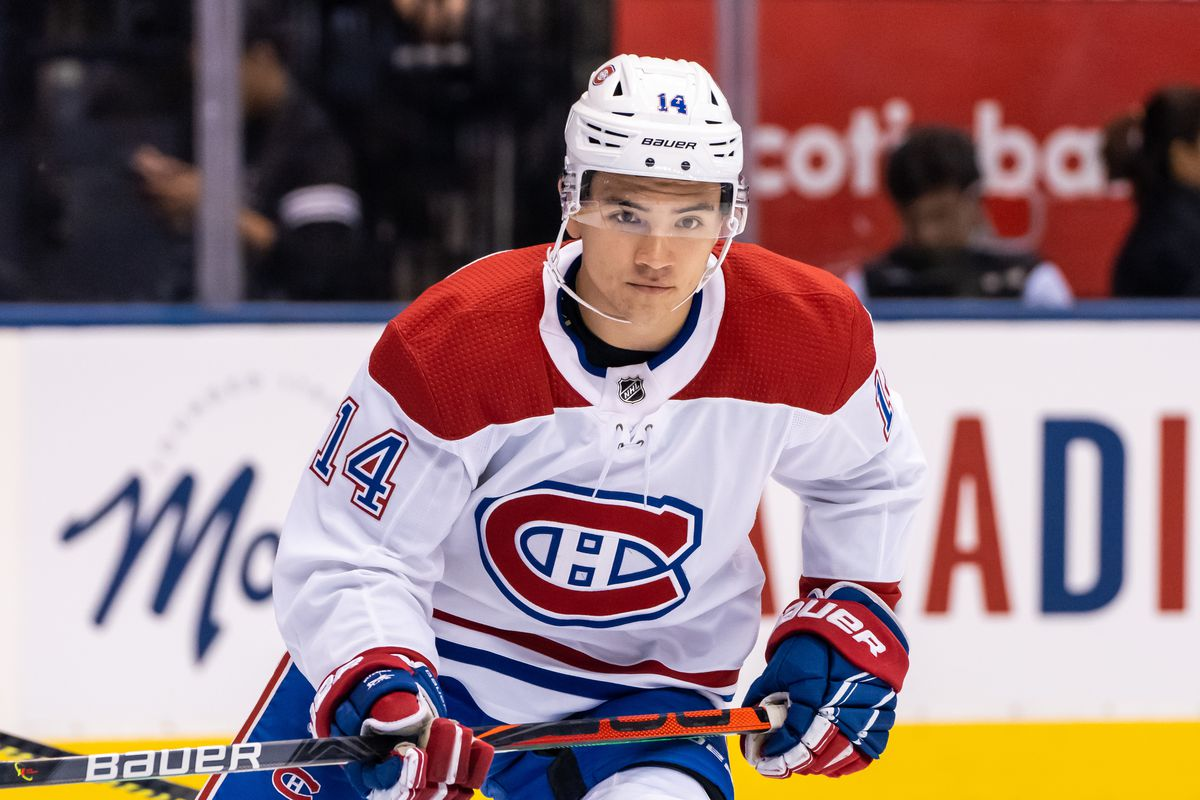
Nick Suzuki with the Montreal Canadiens in 2022

In addition to black and white players, other races and ethnicities represented in the NHL include players of Asian, Latino, and Middle Eastern descent.

Auston Matthews is Mexican-American. He is a center and captain for the Toronto Maple Leafs. He is widely considered as one of the best players in the world with his all-around game and shot threat.

The Montreal Canadiens captain Nick Suzuki is Japanese-Canadian. Suzuki is one-quarter Japanese and is considered Gosei, as his great-great grandparents immigrated to Canada in the early 1900s. He has expressed his desire to become a role model for younger Japanese and other Asian hockey players.

Kiefer Sherwood plays for the San Jose Sharks and is Japanese-American.

== Other staff ==
The NHL released its first inclusion and diversity report in 2022. The self-reported data showed that among all NHL employees, including players and other staff, 83.6% were white; 4.17% were Asian; 3.74% were Black; 3.71% were Hispanic or Latino; 0.5% were Indigenous; 1.81% selected "Other"; and 2.48% selected "Prefer not to answer."

=== Management ===
In July 2022, the San Jose Sharks hired Mike Grier as general manager, making him the first black American to serve as general manager.

=== Officials ===
On April 3, 2001, Jay Sharrers made NHL history as the first black referee to officiate an NHL game. He worked his first game as an NHL referee when the Philadelphia Flyers faced the visiting Florida Panthers.

=== Agents ===
In 2020, the only African American agents in the NHL Players' Association were Eustace King, Brett Peterson and Harkie Singh. King and John Osei-Tutu were agents during 2026.

== Career statistics ==
= NHL All-Star team ·	= NHL All-Star (Note: Players are identified as an All-Star if they were selected for the All-Star game at any time in their career.) ·	= NHL All-Star and NHL All-Star team ·	= Hall of Famers

- **Bold** = Currently playing in NHL
- Italics = Stanley Cup champions
- * = Yet to have played an NHL game for their respective team

=== Asian descent ===
Nat.	Name	Birthplace	Pos	Seasons	Teams Played	Ethnicity	Ref
(Canada)	**Kevin Bahl**	New Westminster, BC	D	2020–present	NJD, CGY	Biracial, Punjabi	
(Canada)	**Arshdeep Bains**	Surrey, BC	LW	2023–present	VAN	Punjabi	
(Canada)	Victor Bartley	Ottawa, ON	D	1998–2015	NSH, MTL	Biracial, Taiwanese	
(Canada)	Robin Bawa	Duncan, BC	RW	1987–1999	WSH, VAN, SJS, ANA	Punjabi	
(Canada)	Chris Beckford-Tseu	Toronto, ON	G	2007–2008	STL	Jamaican-Chinese	
(Canada)	**Jacob Bryson**	London, ON	D	2021–present	BUF	Biracial, Korean	
(Canada)	**Cody Ceci**	Ottawa, ON	D	2013–present	OTT, TOR, PIT, EDM, SJS, DAL, LAK	Biracial, one quarter-Filipino	
(Canada)	**Matt Dumba**	Regina, SK	D	2013–present	MIN, ARI, TBL, DAL, PIT	Romanian-German-Filipino	
(Canada) / (China)	Spencer Foo	Edmonton, AB	RW	2017–2024	CGY, VGK*	Chinese	
(Japan)	Yutaka Fukufuji	Kushiro, Japan	G	2006–2007	LAK	Japanese	
(Canada)	**Akito Hirose**	Calgary, AB	D	2022–present	VAN	Japanese	
(Canada)	Taro Hirose	Winnipeg, MB	LW	2018–2024	DET	Japanese	
(Canada)	Josh Ho-Sang	Toronto, ON	RW	2016–2019	NYI	Jamaican-Jewish-Chinese	
(Canada)	Peter Ing	Toronto, ON	G	1989–1994	TOR, EDM, DET	Biracial, Chinese	
(Canada)	Paul Kariya	North Vancouver, BC	LW	1994–2010	ANA, COL, NSH, STL	Japanese-Scottish	
(Canada)	Steve Kariya	North Vancouver, BC	RW	1999–2000	VAN	Japanese-Scottish	
(Canada)	**Jujhar Khaira**	Surrey, BC	LW	2014–present	EDM, CHI, MIN	Punjabi	
(Canada)	Larry Kwong	Vernon, BC	C	1947–1948	NYR	Chinese	
(Canada)	Manny Malhotra	Mississauga, ON	C	1998–2016	NYR, DAL, CBJ, SJS, VAN, CAR, MTL	Punjabi-French Canadian	
(Norway)	Andreas Martinsen	Bærum, Norway	LW	2015–2019	COL, MTL, CHI	Ugandan Indian-Norwegian	
(Canada)	Jon Matsumoto	Ottawa, ON	C	2010–2012	CAR, FLA	Japanese-German	
(Canada)	Jim Paek	Seoul, South Korea	D	1987–2003	PIT, LAK, OTT	Korean	
(Canada)	**Zayne Parekh**	Nobleton, ON	D	2025–present	CGY	Gujarati-Korean	
(United States)	Richard Park	Seoul, South Korea	RW	1996–2010	PIT, NYI, MIN, VAN	Korean	
(United States)	**Jason Robertson**	Arcadia, CA	LW	2019–present	DAL	Scottish-Filipino	
(United States)	**Nicholas Robertson**	Arcadia, CA	LW	2020–present	TOR	Scottish-Filipino	
(United States)	Bobby Robins	Peshtigo, WI	RW	2014–2015	BOS	Biracial, Filipino	
(Canada)	Raymond Sawada	Richmond, BC	RW	2008–2011	DAL	Japanese-Italian	
(Canada)	Devin Setoguchi	Taber, AB	RW	2007–2018	SJS, MIN, WPG, CGY, LAK	Biracial, Japanese	
(United States)	**Kiefer Sherwood**	Columbus, OH	RW	2018–present	ANA, COL, NSH, VAN, SJS	Biracial, Japanese	
(United States)	Kole Sherwood	New Albany, OH	RW	2018–2022	CBJ, NSH	Biracial, Japanese	
(Canada)	**Devin Shore**	Ajax, ON	C	2015–present	DAL, ANA, CBJ, EDM, SEA, MIN	Biracial, Filipino	
(Switzerland)	**Jonas Siegenthaler**	Zürich, Switzerland	D	2018–present	WSH, NJD	Swiss-Thai	
(Canada)	**Dylan Sikura**	Aurora, ON	C	2018–present	CHI, VGK, COL, ANA*	Slovak-Japanese	
(Canada)	**Jordan Spence**	Sydney, Australia	D	2021–present	LAK, OTT	Biracial, Japanese	
(United States)	Tim Stapleton	La Grange, IL	C	2008–2012	TOR, ATL, WIN	Irish-Filipino	
(Canada)	Jamie Storr	Brampton, ON	G	1994–2004	LAK, CAR	Biracial, Japanese	
(Canada)	**Nick Suzuki**	London, ON	C	2019–present	MTL	Japanese-Scottish	
(Canada)	**Ryan Suzuki**	London, ON	C	2024–present	CAR	Japanese-Scottish	
(United States)	David Tanabe	White Bear Lake, MN	D	1999–2008	BOS, CAR	Japanese	
(United States)	Mike Wong	Minneapolis, MN	C	1975–1976	DET	Chinese-Native	
(United States)	**Kailer Yamamoto**	Spokane, WA	RW	2017–present	EDM, SEA, UTA	Biracial, his father is half-Japanese and his mother is half-Hawaiian	
(Canada) / (China)	Brandon Yip	Vancouver, BC	RW	2009–2014	COL, NSH, PHX	Biracial, Three quarter-Chinese and one quarter-Irish	

==== NHL career ====
These are the top-ten players of Asian descent by career points, goals, and assists. Figures are updated after each completed NHL regular season.

Note: Pos = Position; GP = Games played; G = Goals; A = Assists; Pts = Points; P/G = Points per game; G/G = Goals per game; A/G = Assists per game

Points
Player	Pos	GP	G	A	Pts	P/G
(Canada) Paul Kariya	LW	989	402	587	989	1.00
(United States) **Jason Robertson**	LW	374	168	226	394	1.05
(Canada) **Nick Suzuki**	C	455	138	237	375	.82
(Canada) Manny Malhotra	C	991	116	179	295	.30
(Canada) Devin Setoguchi	RW	516	131	130	261	.51
(Canada) **Matt Dumba**	D	737	84	174	258	.35
(United States) Richard Park	RW	738	102	139	241	.33
(Canada) **Devin Shore**	C	498	52	92	144	.29
(United States) **Kailer Yamamoto**	RW	315	60	77	137	.43
(United States) David Tanabe	D	449	30	84	114	.25

Goals
Player	Pos	G	G/G
(Canada) Paul Kariya	LW	402	.41
(United States) **Jason Robertson**	LW	168	.45
(Canada) **Nick Suzuki**	C	138	.30
(Canada) Devin Setoguchi	RW	131	.25
(Canada) Manny Malhotra	C	116	.12
(United States) Richard Park	RW	102	.14
(Canada) **Matt Dumba**	D	84	.11
(United States) **Kailer Yamamoto**	RW	60	.19
(Canada) **Devin Shore**	C	52	.10
(United States) **Kiefer Sherwood**	RW	43	.16

Assists
Player	Pos	A	A/G
(Canada) Paul Kariya	LW	587	.59
(Canada) **Nick Suzuki**	C	237	.52
(United States) **Jason Robertson**	LW	226	.60
(Canada) Manny Malhotra	C	179	.18
(Canada) **Matt Dumba**	D	174	.24
(United States) Richard Park	RW	139	.19
(Canada) Devin Setoguchi	RW	130	.25
(Canada) **Devin Shore**	C	92	.18
(United States) David Tanabe	D	84	.19
(United States) **Kailer Yamamoto**	RW	77	.24

==== Franchise career ====
These are the top-ten players of Asian descent, by career points, goals, and assists, when counting only their production with a specific franchise. Figures are updated after each completed NHL regular season.

Note: Pos = Position; GP = Games played; G = Goals; A = Assists; Pts = Points; P/G = Points per game; G/G = Goals per game; A/G = Assists per game

Points
Player	GP	G	A	Pts	P/G	Team
(Canada) Paul Kariya (LW)	606	300	369	669	1.10	Mighty Ducks of Anaheim
(United States) **Jason Robertson** (LW)	374	168	226	394	1.05	Dallas Stars
(Canada) **Nick Suzuki** (C)	455	138	237	375	.82	Montreal Canadiens
(Canada) Matt Dumba (D)	598	79	157	236	.39	Minnesota Wild
(Canada) Paul Kariya (LW)	164	55	106	161	.98	Nashville Predators
(Canada) Devin Setoguchi (RW)	267	84	75	159	.60	San Jose Sharks
(Canada) Manny Malhotra (C)	344	53	92	145	.42	Columbus Blue Jackets
(Canada) Paul Kariya (LW)	168	36	87	123	.73	St. Louis Blues
(United States) Richard Park (RW)	316	45	75	120	.38	New York Islanders
(United States) Kailer Yamamoto (RW)	244	50	68	118	.48	Edmonton Oilers

Goals
Player	G	G/G	Team
(Canada) Paul Kariya (LW)	300	.50	Mighty Ducks of Anaheim
(United States) **Jason Robertson** (LW)	168	.45	Dallas Stars
(Canada) **Nick Suzuki** (C)	138	.30	Montreal Canadiens
(Canada) Devin Setoguchi (RW)	84	.31	San Jose Sharks
(Canada) Matt Dumba (D)	79	.13	Minnesota Wild
(Canada) Paul Kariya (LW)	55	.34	Nashville Predators
(Canada) Manny Malhotra (C)	53	.15	Columbus Blue Jackets
(United States) Kailer Yamamoto (RW)	50	.22	Edmonton Oilers
(United States) Richard Park (RW)	45	.14	New York Islanders
(United States) Richard Park (RW)	37	.17	Minnesota Wild

Assists
Player	A	A/G	Team
(Canada) Paul Kariya (LW)	369	.61	Mighty Ducks of Anaheim
(Canada) **Nick Suzuki** (C)	237	.52	Montreal Canadiens
(United States) **Jason Robertson** (LW)	226	.60	Dallas Stars
(Canada) Matt Dumba (D)	157	.26	Minnesota Wild
(Canada) Paul Kariya (LW)	106	.65	Nashville Predators
(Canada) Manny Malhotra (C)	92	.27	Columbus Blue Jackets
(Canada) Paul Kariya (LW)	87	.52	St. Louis Blues
(Canada) Devin Setoguchi (RW)	75	.28	San Jose Sharks
(United States) Richard Park (RW)	75	.24	New York Islanders
(United States) Kailer Yamamoto (RW)	68	.28	Edmonton Oilers

=== First Nation/Native American descent ===
Nat.	Name	Birthplace	Pos	Seasons	Teams Played	Ethnicity	Ref
(Canada)	George Armstrong	Skead, Ontario	RW	1949–1971	TOR	Biracial Ojibwe-Canadian	
(Canada)	Bryan Trottier	Val Marie, Saskatchewan	C	1975–1994	NYI, PIT	Biracial Cree-Canadian	
(Canada)	Ted Nolan	Garden River, Ontario	LW	1981–1986	DET, PIT	Ojibwe-Canadian	
(Canada)	Grant Fuhr	Spruce Grove, Alberta	G	1981–2000	EDM, TOR, BUF, LAK, STL, CGY	Biracial Cree and Afro-Canadian	
(Canada)	Everett Sanipass	Elsipogtog First Nation, New Brunswick	LW	1986–1991	CHI, QUE	Mi'kmaq	
(Canada)	Craig Berube	Calahoo, Alberta	LW	1986–2003	PHI, TOR, CGY, WSH, NYI	Biracial Cree-Canadian	
(Canada)	Theoren Fleury	Oxbow, Saskatchewan	RW	1988–2003	CAL, NYR	Métis Canadian	
(Canada)	Gino Odjick	Maniwaki, Québec	LW	1990–2002	MTL, NYI, VAN, PHI	Biracial Algonquian-Canadian	
(Canada)	Blair Atcheynum	Estevan, Saskatchewan	RW	1992–2001	OTT, NSH, STL, CHI	Cree descent	
(Canada)	Arron Asham	Portage la Prairie, Manitoba	RW	1998–2014	MTL, NYI, NJD, PHI, PIT, NYR	Métis Canadian	
(Canada)	Jordin Tootoo	Churchill, Manitoba	RW	2003–2017	NSH, NJD, DET, CHI	Inuit	
(Canada)	René Bourque	Lac La Biche, Alberta	LW	2005–2017	MTL, CAL, CLB, CHI	Métis Canadian	
(Canada)	Carey Price	Vancouver, British Columbia	G	2007–2022	MTL	Biracial Dakelh-Canadian	
(United States)	T. J. Oshie	Mount Vernon, Washington	RW	2008–2024	STL, WSH	Biracial Ojibwe-American	
(Canada)	Michael Ferland	Swan River, Manitoba	LW	2014–2020	CAR, CAL, VAN	Cree descent	
(Canada)	Chris Simon	Wawa, Ontario	LW	1992-2013	CAR, CAL, VAN	Biracial Ojibwe-Canadian	
(Canada)	**Brandon Montour**	Ohsweken, Ontario	D	2016–present	ANA, BUF, FLO, SEA	Mohawk descent	
(Canada)	Henry Maracle	Ayr, Ontario	LW	1930-31	NYR	Mohawk descent	
(Canada)	**Ethan Bear**	Regina, Saskatchewan	D	2018–present	EDM, CAR, VAN	Cree descent	
(Canada)	**Zach Whitecloud**	Brandon, Manitoba	D	2018–present	VGK, CGY	Dakota-Canadian	
(United States)	**Garrett Pilon**	Mineola, New York	C	2021–present	WSH, OTT	Métis American	
(Canada)	Rich Pilon	Saskatoon, Saskatchewan	D	1989-2002	NYI, NYR, STL	Métis descent	
(Canada)	Fred Sasakamoose	Debden, Saskatchewan	C	1954	CHI	Cree	
(Canada)	Reggie Leach	Riverton, Manitoba	RW	1971-1983	BOS, CGS, PHI, DET	Ojibwe	
(Canada)	Jamie Leach	Winnipeg, Manitoba	RW	1990-1994	PIT, HAR, FLO	Ojibwe descent	
(Canada)	Stan Jonathan	Ohsweken, Ontario	LW	1976-1983	BOS, PIT	Tuscarora	
(Canada)	Jonathan Cheechoo	Moose Factory, Ontario	RW	2003-2010	SJS, OTT	Cree	
(Canada)	Dwight King	Meadow Lake, Saskatchewan	LW	2011-2017	LAK, MTL	Métis descent	
(Canada)	**Connor Dewar**	The Pas, Manitoba	C	2022–Present	MIN, TOR, PIT	Métis descent	
(Canada)	D.J. King	Meadow Lake, Saskatchewan	C	2007-2012	STL, WSH	Métis descent	
(Canada)	**Calen Addison**	Brandon, Manitoba	D	2021–Present	MIN	Métis descent	
(Canada)	**Travis Hamonic**	St. Malo, Manitoba	D	2011–Present	NYI, CGY, VAN, OTT	Métis descent	
(Canada)	**Brady Keeper**	Cross Lake, Manitoba	D	2019–Present	FLO	Cree	
(Canada)	Michael McNiven	Winnipeg, Manitoba	G	2022	MTL	Métis descent	
(Canada)	Jim Neilson	Big River, Saskatchewan	D	1963-1979	NYR, CGS, CLE	Cree	
(Canada)	Ted Hodgson	Hobbema, Alberta	RW	1967	BOS	Cree	
(Canada)	Harry York	Ponoka, Alberta	C	1997-2000	STL, NYR, PIT, VAN	Cree	
(Canada)	Scott Daniels	Prince Albert, Saskatchewan	LW	1993-1999	HFD, PHI, NJD	Cree	
(Canada)	Dale McCourt	Falconbridge, Ontario	C	1978-1984	DET, BUF, TOR	Cree	

=== Latin American descent ===
Nat.	Name	Birthplace	Pos	Seasons	Teams Played	Ethnicity	Ref
(United States)	Scott Gomez	Anchorage, Alaska	C	1999–2016	NJ, NYR, MTL	Colombian Mexican American	
(United States)	Bill Guerin	Worcester, Massachusetts	RW	1991–2010	NJD, EDM, BOS, DAL, STL, SJS, NYI, PIT	Nicaraguan American	
(United States)	**Auston Matthews**	San Ramon, California	C	2016–present	TOR	Half Mexican American	
(United States)	Al Montoya	Chicago, Illinois	G	2006–2018	NYI, MTL, FLA, WIN	Cuban American	
(United States)	**Matt Nieto**	Long Beach, California	LW	2013–present	COL, SJS, PIT	Mexican American	
(United States)	Max Pacioretty	New Canaan, Connecticut	LW	2008–2025	MTL, VGK, CAR	Half Mexican American	
(Canada)	Bryce Salvador	Brandon, Manitoba	D	2001–2015	STL, NJD	Half Afro-Brazilian Half Ukrainian	
(Canada)	Raffi Torres	Toronto, Ontario	LW	2001–2016	EDM, SJ, PHO	Half Mexican Canadian Half Peruvian (of Italian, Greek, and Serbian ancestry)	

=== Middle Eastern descent ===
Nat.	Name	Birthplace	Pos	Seasons	Teams Played	Ethnicity	Ref
(United States)	Justin Abdelkader	Muskegon, Michigan	LW	2008–2021	DET	Jordanian-American	
(Canada)	Ramzi Abid	Montreal, Québec	LW	2000–2014	PHO, PIT, ATL	Lebanese-Canadian	
(Canada) / (Turkey)	Nick Cicek	Winnipeg, Manitoba	D	2022–2024	SJS	Turkish-Canadian	
(Canada)	John Hanna	Sydney, Nova Scotia	D	1958–1968	NYR, MTL	Lebanese-Canadian	
(Canada)	Ed Hatoum	Beirut, Lebanon	RW	1968–1971	DET, VAN	Lebanese	
(Canada)	**Nazem Kadri**	London, Ontario	C	2010–present	TOR, COL, CGY	Lebanese-Canadian	
(Canada)	Alain Nasreddine	Montreal, Québec	D	1995–2010	NYI, MTL, PIT	Biracial Lebanese-Canadian	
(United States)	**Brandon Saad**	Pittsburgh, Pennsylvania	LW	2011–present	CHI, CBJ, COL, STL, VGK	Syrian American	
(Sweden)	**Mika Zibanejad**	Huddinge, Sweden	C	2010–present	OTT, NYR	Biracial Iranian-Finnish	

== In media and popular culture ==
Indian Horse is a 2012 novel by Canadian writer Richard Wagamese. The novel centres on Saul Indian Horse, a First Nations boy who survives the residential school system and becomes a talented ice hockey player, only for his past traumas to resurface in his adulthood. A film adaptation, Indian Horse, was directed by Stephen Campanelli and premiered at the 2017 Toronto International Film Festival.

The popular ice hockey television show Heated Rivalry features a Japanese-Canadian captain.

== See also ==
- Black players in ice hockey
  - List of black NHL players
  - List of Indian NHL players
- Race and sports
- Race and sports in the United States
- African Americans in sports
- Asian Americans in sports
