= Arshdeep Bains =

Canadian ice hockey player (born 2001)

- Born: January 9, 2001 (age 25) Surrey, British Columbia, Canada
- Height: 6 ft 0 in (183 cm)
- Weight: 184 lb (83 kg; 13 st 2 lb)
- Position: Left wing
- Shoots: Left
- NHL team: Vancouver Canucks
- NHL draft: Undrafted
- Playing career: 2022–present

Arshdeep Singh Bains (born January 9, 2001) is a Canadian professional ice hockey left winger for the Vancouver Canucks of the National Hockey League (NHL).

== Early life ==
Bains was born on January 9, 2001 to a Punjabi Canadian Sikh family in Surrey, British Columbia, Canada. His parents immigrated to Canada from Punjab, India, in 1982. Bains first learned to skate in Newton, Surrey, and his family later moved to Cloverdale, Surrey. Bains played in the Surrey Minor Hockey League as a child. He began playing ice hockey after playing mini-sticks and road hockey with his older brothers. As Bains was raised in Metro Vancouver, he grew up idolizing the Vancouver Canucks and has been a lifelong fan of the hometown team.

While growing up in Surrey, Bains began playing AAA ice hockey with the Burnaby Winter Club Bruins. He was also a member of the BC Junior Canucks that competed at the 2011 Brick Hockey Invitational Hockey Tournament. In 2012, he was the top scorer in the Bell Capital Cup tournament as he led the Burnaby Winter Club Bruins to a championship win. Following the Bruins, Bains enrolled at Delta Hockey Academy where he played on their U15 Prep team in the Canadian Sport School Hockey League.

After being passed over in the Western Hockey League (WHL) Draft, Bains was recruited to attend the Red Deer Rebels rookie camp. When he failed to make the team, Bains played one season with the Vancouver North East Chiefs U18 AAA team during the 2016–17 season. The following season, he again attended the Rebels training camp but was returned to the Valley West Hawks of the BC Hockey Major Midget League (BCMML).

== Playing career ==
=== Amateur ===
In 2017, Bains was named to the Red Deer Rebels' 50-player protected list, allowing them to call him up to the WHL if needed. After accumulating 16 goals and 41 assists for 56 points through 22 games with the Valley West Hawks, Bains joined the Rebels for the remainder of the season. Before joining the Rebels, Bains was recognized as the BCMML's "Player of the Month" for November. He finished his rookie season with the Rebels with seven points through 40 games. Bains returned to the Rebels for the 2018–19 season where he set new career-highs in goals, assists, and points.

Although the 2019–20 season was shortened due to the COVID-19 pandemic, Bains broke numerous personal records by setting career highs in goals, assists, and points. After working to improve himself over the summer, Bains began receiving more responsibility on the ice as he also found chemistry with linemates Ben King and Chris Douglas. He finished the season with 18 goals and 51 points through 63 games before the season was cancelled.

As a result of the COVID-19 pandemic, Bains and his Red Deer Rebels teammates lived in the Rebels' home arena, the Westerner Park Centrium, for the entirety of the 2020–21 season. In March 2021, Bains was named an alternate captain for the Rebels alongside King, Douglas, Josh Tarzwell, and Zak Smith.

In his final season with the Rebels, Bains broke out offensively and set career-highs in goals, assists, and points. Bains was the WHL's top scorer for the 2021–22 season, finishing the season with 43 goals and 69 assists, also becoming the first player of South Asian descent to win the Bob Clarke Trophy.

=== Professional ===
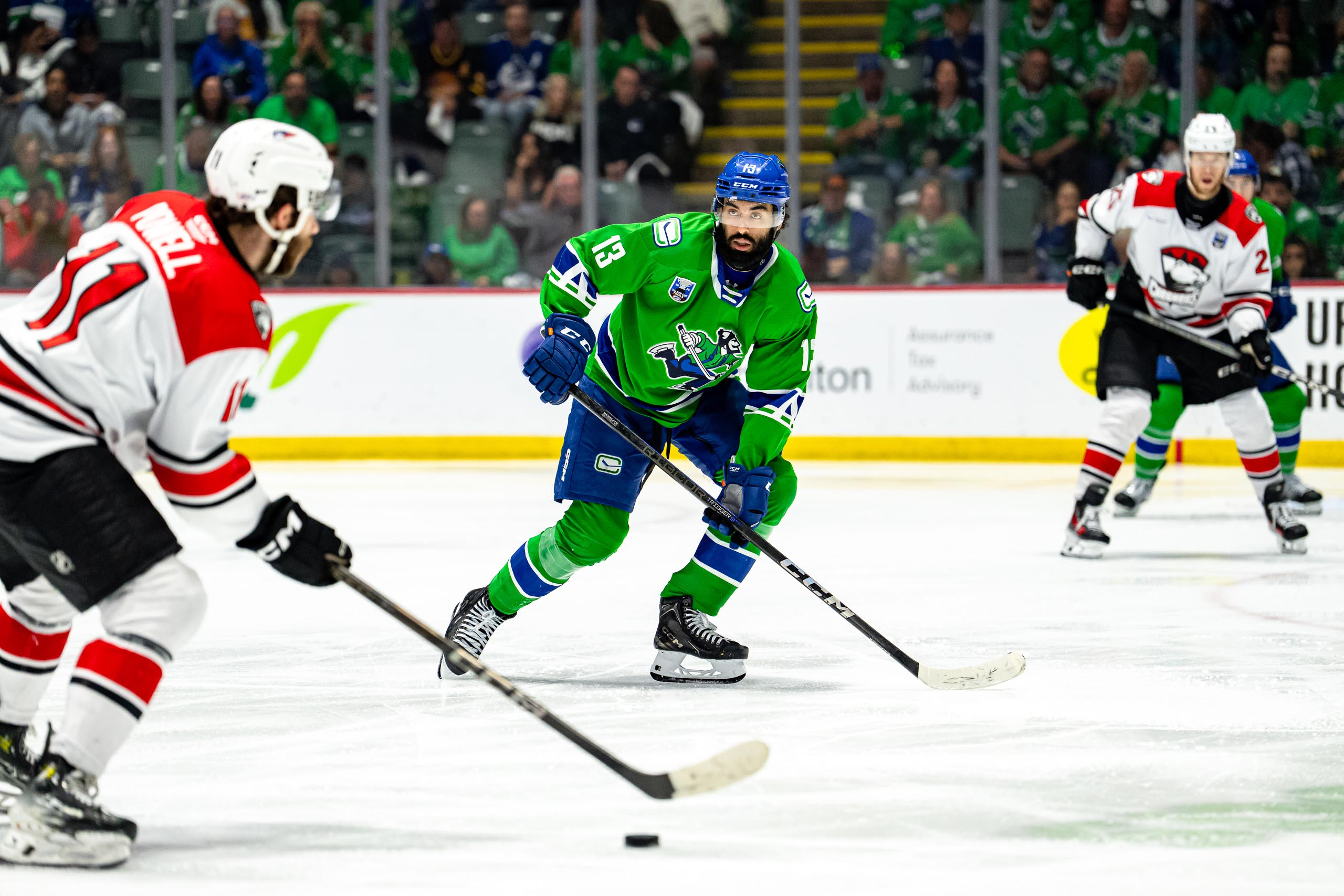
Bains in Game 5 of the 2025 Calder Cup Finals.

On March 11, 2022, Bains signed an entry-level contract with the Vancouver Canucks. After participating in the Canucks' training camp and pre-season games, Bains was reassigned to their American Hockey League (AHL) affiliate, the Abbotsford Canucks, for the 2022–23 season. He scored his first professional goal in his first career AHL game in Abbotsford's season-opening 8–2 loss to the Ontario Reign. Bains then quickly tallied 13 points in his first 24 games by January 3, 2023.

On February 20, 2024, Bains made his NHL debut with the Canucks in a 3–1 loss to the Colorado Avalanche. On his debut, Bains became one of four Punjabi players to play in the National Hockey League, the others being Robin Bawa, Manny Malhotra and Jujhar Khaira.

On October 7, 2024, Bains was reassigned to the Abbotsford Canucks after attending the Canucks 2024 training camp. He was quickly recalled to the NHL on October 10 to start the 2024–25 season. On October 26, 2024, Bains scored his first NHL goal, the game-winner in a 4–3 victory over the Pittsburgh Penguins.

On June 23, 2025, Bains won the Calder Cup as a member of the Abbotsford Canucks. He contributed 24 points in 24 games in Abbotsford's playoff run.

== Career statistics ==
Bold indicates led league

			Regular season					Playoffs
Season	Team	League	GP	G	A	Pts	PIM	GP	G	A	Pts	PIM
2017–18	Red Deer Rebels	WHL	40	2	5	7	13	5	0	0	0	4
2018–19	Red Deer Rebels	WHL	63	6	12	18	37	4	0	0	0	0
2019–20	Red Deer Rebels	WHL	63	18	33	51	18	—	—	—	—	—
2020–21	Red Deer Rebels	WHL	23	8	13	21	15	—	—	—	—	—
2021–22	Red Deer Rebels	WHL	68	43	69	**112**	56	10	4	6	10	12
2022–23	Abbotsford Canucks	AHL	66	13	25	38	28	6	2	1	3	4
2023–24	Abbotsford Canucks	AHL	59	16	39	55	28	6	2	2	4	2
2023–24	Vancouver Canucks	NHL	8	0	0	0	6	—	—	—	—	—
2024–25	Vancouver Canucks	NHL	13	1	0	1	0	—	—	—	—	—
2024–25	Abbotsford Canucks	AHL	50	11	32	43	26	24	7	**17**	24	24
2025–26	Vancouver Canucks	NHL	28	1	4	5	12	—	—	—	—	—
2025–26	Abbotsford Canucks	AHL	34	11	13	24	22	—	—	—	—	—
NHL totals			49	2	4	6	18	—	—	—	—	—

== Awards and honours ==
Award	Year	Ref
AHL
Calder Cup Champion	2025	

== See also ==
- List of Indo-Canadians
- List of Indian NHL players
