= List of Indian NHL players =

This is a list of National Hockey League (NHL) players of Indian descent.

== List ==
Players who have played in the NHL:

Bold: organization by which player is currently playing

Indian NHL players
Nat.	Name	Birthplace	Pos	Seasons	Teams played	Ethnicity	Ref
(Canada)	Arshdeep Bains	Surrey, BC	LW	2024–present	**VAN**	Punjabi	
(Canada)	Kevin Bahl	New Westminster, BC	D	2020–present	NJD, **CGY**	Mixed (Punjabi–White)	
(Canada)	Dylan Guenther	Edmonton, AB	C	2022–present	ARI, **UTA**	Mixed (Kenyan-Indian–White)	
(Canada)	Robin Bawa	Duncan, BC	RW	1987–1999	WSH, VAN, SJS, ANA	Punjabi	
(Canada)	Jujhar Khaira	Surrey, BC	LW	2015–2024	EDM, CHI, MIN	Punjabi	
(Canada)	Manny Malhotra	Mississauga, ON	C	1998–2016	NYR, DAL, CBJ, SJS, VAN, CAR, MTL	Mixed (Punjabi–French)	
(Norway)	Andreas Martinsen	Bærum, Norway	LW	2015–2019	COL, MTL, CHI	Mixed (Ugandan Indian–Norwegian)	
(Canada)	Zayne Parekh	Nobleton, ON	D	2025–present	**CGY**	Mixed (Gujarati-Korean)	
(United States)	Jordan Schmaltz	Madison, WI	D	2016–2019	STL	Mixed (Gujarati-American)	
(United States)	Nick Schmaltz	Madison, WI	F	2016–present	CHI, ARI, **UTA**	Mixed (Gujarati-American)	

== See also ==
- Black players in ice hockey
- List of black NHL players
- Race and ethnicity in the NHL
