= Akim Aliu =

Nigerian-born Canadian-Ukrainian ice hockey player

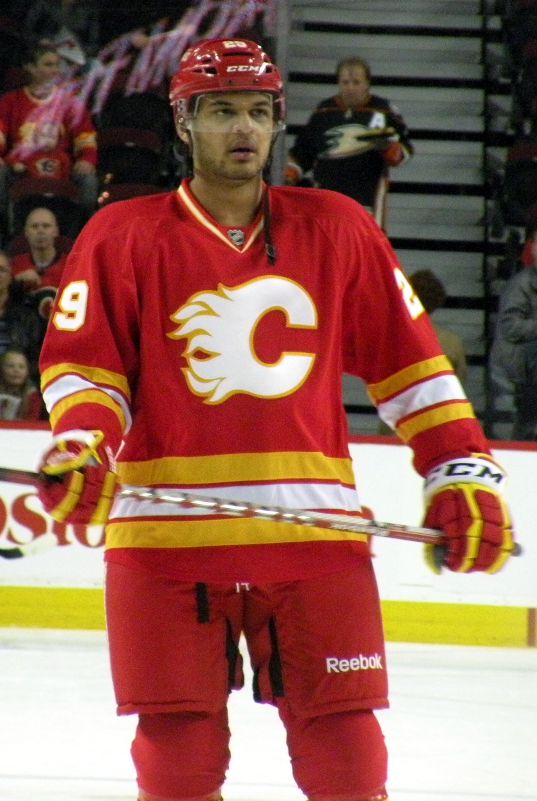
- Aliu with the Calgary Flames in 2012
- Born: April 24, 1989 (age 37) Okene, Nigeria
- Height: 6 ft 4 in (193 cm)
- Weight: 225 lb (102 kg; 16 st 1 lb)
- Position: Right wing/defence
- Shot: Right
- Played for: Calgary Flames; AIK IF; Amur Khabarovsk; HC '05 Banská Bystrica; Karlskrona HK; HC Litvínov
- NHL draft: 56th overall, 2007; Chicago Blackhawks
- Playing career: 2008–2020; 2024

Akim Olumide Aliu (born April 24, 1989) is a Nigerian-born Ukrainian–Canadian former professional ice hockey player. Aliu was a second-round selection of the Chicago Blackhawks, 56th overall, in the 2007 NHL entry draft and has played for several AHL and ECHL teams in both the Blackhawks and Atlanta Thrashers/Winnipeg Jets organizations before a trade to the Calgary Flames. Aliu made his NHL debut on April 5, 2012.

== Early life ==
Aliu was born in Okene, Nigeria and grew up in Kyiv, Ukraine. His father, Tai, a Nigerian, attended university in Kyiv on a track and field scholarship where he met and married Aliu's mother, Larissa, a Ukrainian. He has a brother, Edward. Aliu considers himself Ukrainian–Canadian and attests that he and his family live according to Ukrainian culture; and that he would have played for the Ukraine national team, if asked. Aliu still speaks Ukrainian to his family. Uncomfortable with the political climate following the demise of the Soviet Union, Aliu's parents moved the family to Canada when he was 7 and settled in the Toronto area. The family initially struggled while Tai studied to become a computer programmer.

Arriving in Canada, Aliu spoke fluent Ukrainian and Russian but no English and had never played hockey. His first pair of skates was purchased at a garage sale and he began playing in a house league in the Toronto neighbourhood of Parkdale. He had a natural talent for the game and within a few years was drafted into the Ontario Hockey League (OHL) in the first round by the Windsor Spitfires.

== Playing career ==
=== Junior ===
Early in the 2005–06 OHL season, his first in the league, Aliu was involved in an incident with Steve Downie during practice after the latter player cross-checked him in the face, knocking out seven teeth. After leaving for treatment, Aliu returned to the ice and fought Downie. The incident stemmed primarily from Aliu's refusal to participate in a hazing ritual that would have forced him and the other rookies to stand naked in a cramped bus washroom. The fight and the reasons for it was international news and strained the relationship between Aliu and his teammates. As a result, Downie was suspended for five games, Aliu for one game, and both players demanded trades out of Windsor. Moe Mantha was given a 40-game ban from coaching by the league for the incidents and also suspended for one year as the team's general manager. The team was fined $35,000. In 2020, Aliu revealed more details about his time with the Spitfires, including that he believed Downie had taken a particular interest in treating him abusively in this and previous incidents because of Aliu's different racial and ethnic background.

The Spitfires traded Aliu to the Sudbury Wolves following the incident, where he was forced to sit out two months due to OHL rules that forbade trading 16-year-olds. He appeared in a total of 47 games that season, scoring 10 goals and 10 assists. He remained a controversial figure in the OHL, serving ten games in suspensions early in the 2006–07 season but was also ranked as the fifth best prospect for the 2007 NHL entry draft in an early season update by the league's scouting services. He missed the final two games of the regular season for disciplinary reasons but returned to play 21 games in the playoffs as the Wolves reached the finals, losing to the Plymouth Whalers.

He carried a reputation as a difficult player to manage into the draft, and despite his early rating, fell to the second round, where the Chicago Blackhawks selected him 56th overall. Following the draft, Aliu swore that he would make teams regret not picking him earlier. Aliu remained in junior for the 2007–08 OHL season, but with a new team as he was traded to the London Knights. It was his best junior season as he scored 61 points in 60 games and then played his first professional games, joining Chicago's American Hockey League (AHL) affiliate, the Rockford IceHogs for two games once his junior season ended. Aliu was again returned to junior for the 2008–09 season. He was traded back to Sudbury midway through the season, and recorded 42 points in 45 games split between the two teams.

=== Professional ===
Aliu signed his first professional contract on August 25, 2008, a three-year deal with the Blackhawks. In addition to his two games with Rockford at the end of the 2007–08 campaign, Aliu joined Rockford for five games at the end of 2008–09, scoring two goals, before joining the team full-time in the 2009–10 AHL season. He scored 11 goals and 6 assists in 48 games, but was demoted to the ECHL's Toledo Walleye late in the year. Following the season, his playing rights were traded to the Atlanta Thrashers. On June 23, 2010, he was included in a deal that also saw Dustin Byfuglien, Ben Eager, and Brent Sopel head to Atlanta in exchange for Marty Reasoner, Joey Crabb, Jeremy Morin and two draft picks. Aliu spent the majority of the 2010–11 season with the Thrashers' AHL affiliate, the Chicago Wolves, but also played on loan with the Peoria Rivermen and had another stint in the ECHL, with the Gwinnett Gladiators. He also missed time during the season after suffering a broken hand in a bar fight.

The Thrashers were relocated north for the 2011–12 NHL season, becoming the Winnipeg Jets. He did not figure in the new management's plans, and after failing to make the roster of Winnipeg's AHL affiliate, started the season again in the ECHL with the Colorado Eagles. He played 10 games in Colorado and was later loaned to Austrian Hockey League club EC Red Bull Salzburg for a December tournament, but entered the Christmas break without a team to play for.

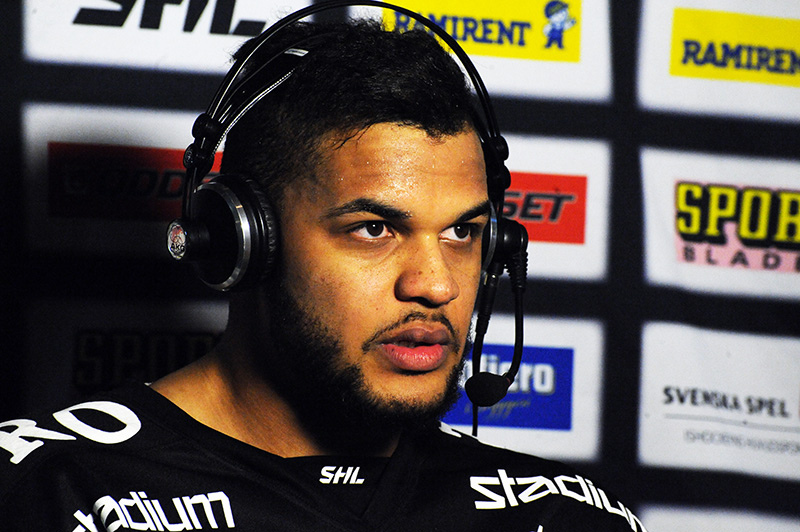
Aliu during his brief tenure with AIK IF in 2014.

Aliu met with Calgary Flames general manager Jay Feaster and convinced him that he deserved another opportunity. Though he remained property of the Jets, the Flames acquired him on loan for their AHL team, the Abbotsford Heat. He was placed in a checking role with Abbotsford rather than the scoring role he typically played, and performed well enough that the Flames sent defenceman John Negrin to the Jets on January 30, 2012, in a trade to acquire Aliu's NHL rights. The Flames recalled Aliu late in the season, and he made his NHL debut on April 5. He scored his first point, assisting on a Michael Cammalleri goal in a 3–2 victory over the Vancouver Canucks. Following the game, Aliu admitted that his travails in the previous three years helped him mature as a player and change his life and career for the better.

He scored his first two NHL goals and was named the game's first star two days later in a 5–2 victory over the Anaheim Ducks. The Flames re-signed Aliu following the season as they agreed on a one-year deal. He appeared in five games with the Flames in the lockout-shortened 2012–13 season, but spent most of the year with the Heat. He was not offered a new contract by the Flames and joined the AHL's Hamilton Bulldogs on a tryout agreement.

On October 10, 2014, Aliu signed with the Rochester Americans for the beginning of the 2014–15 season, after a successful training camp tryout. He featured in 10 games with the Americans before he was released and later signed by the Bakersfield Condors of the ECHL on January 23, 2015. Aliu played 15 games with the Condors before he was loaned to play a solitary game to complete his season with the Oklahoma City Barons of the AHL. His ECHL rights were traded by the Condors to the Orlando Solar Bears on March 12, 2015.

As a free agent over the summer without having appeared with the Solar Bears, Aliu attended the Lake Erie Monsters training camp for the 2015–16 season, however, was unable to secure a contract offer. Over a month later, Aliu returned overseas to sign for the remainder of the season with Russian club, Amur Khabarovsk of the KHL, on November 6, 2015.

On November 25, 2019, while a free agent, Aliu went public with allegations that at-the-time current Calgary Flames coach Bill Peters, while coaching the AHL’s Rockford IceHogs, directed racial epithets at him in the locker room. As a result, Peters submitted his resignation four days later.

On January 21, 2020, Aliu resumed his professional career, securing a contract for the remaining 14 games of the 2019–20 season with Czech club, HC Litvínov, of the Czech Extraliga (ELH).

On June 8, 2020, Aliu co-founded the Hockey Diversity Alliance, alongside Evander Kane, to address intolerance and racism in hockey.

Aliu returned to professional hockey on March 20, 2024, announcing that he had signed a professional tryout contract with the San Jose Barracuda, the AHL affiliate of the San Jose Sharks. He made three appearances in the 2023–24 season, going scoreless for the Barracuda.

== Career statistics ==
			Regular season					Playoffs
Season	Team	League	GP	G	A	Pts	PIM	GP	G	A	Pts	PIM
2004–05	Milton Icehawks	OPJHL	2	0	2	2	0	—	—	—	—	—
2005–06	Windsor Spitfires	OHL	18	3	4	7	25	—	—	—	—	—
2005–06	Sudbury Wolves	OHL	29	7	6	13	54	6	0	1	1	7
2006–07	Sudbury Wolves	OHL	53	20	22	42	104	21	1	5	6	50
2007–08	London Knights	OHL	60	28	33	61	133	5	2	1	3	15
2007–08	Rockford IceHogs	AHL	2	0	0	0	2	—	—	—	—	—
2008–09	London Knights	OHL	16	8	10	18	30	—	—	—	—	—
2008–09	Sudbury Wolves	OHL	29	10	16	26	61	6	2	1	3	14
2008–09	Rockford IceHogs	AHL	5	2	0	2	14	1	1	0	1	0
2009–10	Rockford IceHogs	AHL	48	11	6	17	69	—	—	—	—	—
2009–10	Toledo Walleye	ECHL	13	5	9	14	18	2	1	1	2	16
2010–11	Chicago Wolves	AHL	43	4	5	9	53	—	—	—	—	—
2010–11	Gwinnett Gladiators	ECHL	16	12	8	20	22	—	—	—	—	—
2010–11	Peoria Rivermen	AHL	16	5	4	9	20	2	1	0	1	6
2011–12	Colorado Eagles	ECHL	10	2	4	6	28	—	—	—	—	—
2011–12	Abbotsford Heat	AHL	42	10	4	14	59	5	0	1	1	28
2011–12	Calgary Flames	NHL	2	2	1	3	12	—	—	—	—	—
2012–13	Abbotsford Heat	AHL	42	4	7	11	111	—	—	—	—	—
2012–13	Calgary Flames	NHL	5	0	0	0	14	—	—	—	—	—
2013–14	Hamilton Bulldogs	AHL	14	3	1	4	18	—	—	—	—	—
2013–14	Hartford Wolf Pack	AHL	9	1	0	1	7	—	—	—	—	—
2013–14	AIK IF	SHL	2	1	0	1	6	—	—	—	—	—
2014–15	Rochester Americans	AHL	10	3	1	4	51	—	—	—	—	—
2014–15	Bakersfield Condors	ECHL	15	2	7	9	24	—	—	—	—	—
2014–15	Oklahoma City Barons	AHL	1	0	0	0	0	—	—	—	—	—
2015–16	Amur Khabarovsk	KHL	19	2	5	7	52	—	—	—	—	—
2016–17	Florida Everblades	ECHL	11	5	6	11	28	—	—	—	—	—
2016–17	Atlanta Gladiators	ECHL	2	0	1	1	33	—	—	—	—	—
2016–17	Cleveland Monsters	AHL	13	3	2	5	19	—	—	—	—	—
2017–18	HC '05 Banská Bystrica	Slovak	9	2	4	6	14	—	—	—	—	—
2017–18	Karlskrona HK	SHL	6	0	0	0	62	—	—	—	—	—
2017–18	IK Pantern	Allsv	6	0	1	1	16	3	1	1	2	8
2018–19	Orlando Solar Bears	ECHL	11	4	5	9	10	—	—	—	—	—
2019–20	HC Litvínov	ELH	6	1	2	3	0	—	—	—	—	—
2023–24	San Jose Barracuda	AHL	3	0	0	0	2	—	—	—	—	—
NHL totals			7	2	1	3	26	—	—	—	—	—
