= Jujhar Khaira =

Canadian ice hockey player (born 1994)

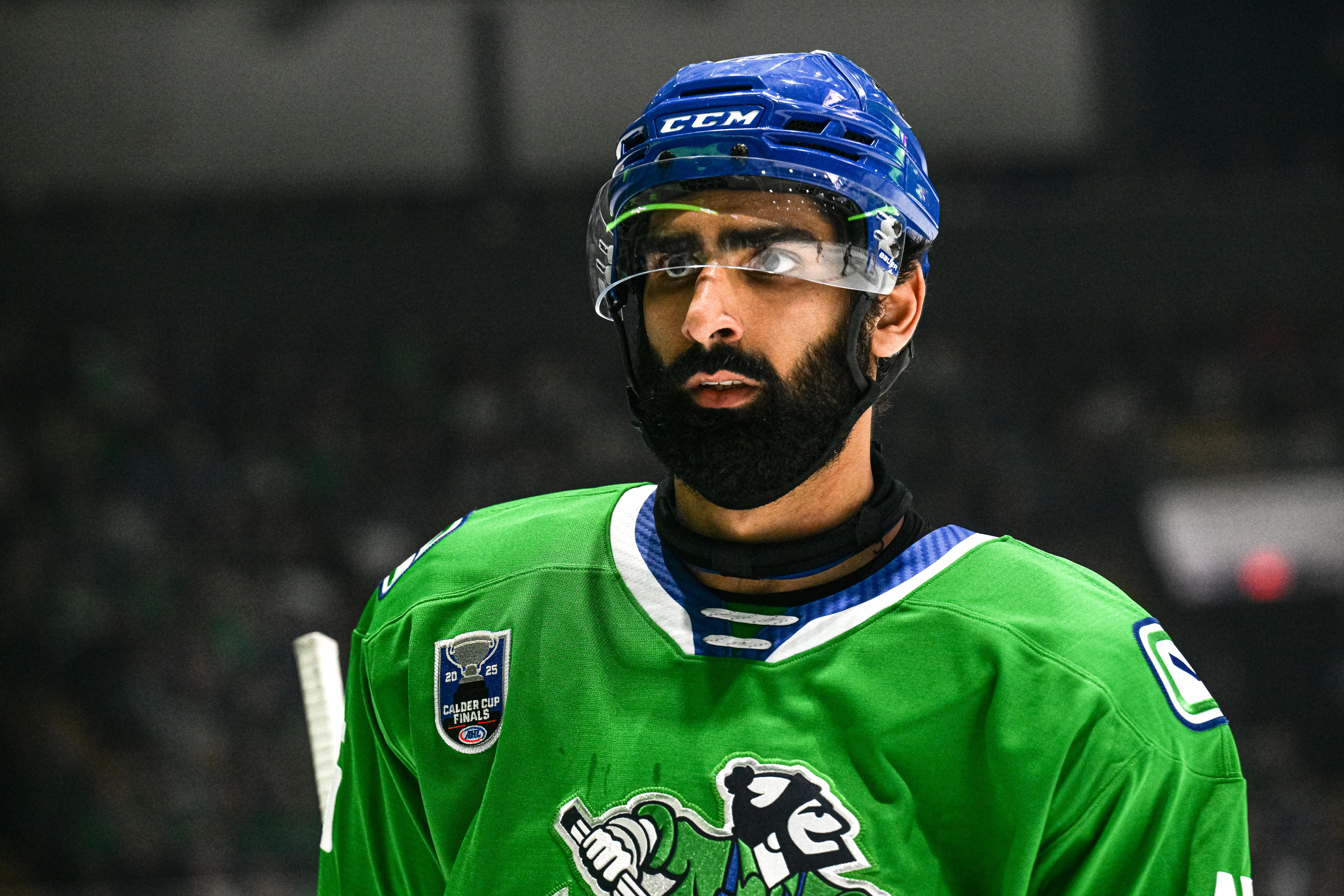
- Khaira with the Abbotsford Canucks in 2025.
- Born: August 13, 1994 (age 32) Surrey, British Columbia, Canada
- Height: 6 ft 4 in (193 cm)
- Weight: 212 lb (96 kg; 15 st 2 lb)
- Position: Forward
- Shoots: Left
- team Former teams: Free agent Edmonton Oilers; Chicago Blackhawks; Minnesota Wild
- NHL draft: 63rd overall, 2012; Edmonton Oilers
- Playing career: 2014–present

Jujhar Khaira (born August 13, 1994) is a Canadian professional ice hockey forward who is currently an unrestricted free agent. He most recently played for the Abbotsford Canucks of the American Hockey League (AHL). He has previously played in the National Hockey League (NHL) for the Edmonton Oilers, Chicago Blackhawks and Minnesota Wild.

== Playing career ==
Khaira was selected 63rd overall by the Edmonton Oilers in the 2012 NHL entry draft after his second season in the British Columbia Hockey League (BCHL) with the Prince George Spruce Kings. Shortly after the draft, Khaira committed to play collegiate ice hockey with Michigan Tech of the Western Collegiate Hockey Association (WCHA).

At the completion of his freshman season in 2012–13 with the Huskies, Khaira left college to pursue a major junior career closer to home in the Western Hockey League (WHL) with the Everett Silvertips. On August 7, 2013, he was signed to a three-year, entry-level contract by the Edmonton Oilers. In the following 2013–14 season, Khaira posted 43 points in 59 games with the Silvertips. At the elimination in first-round of the postseason, Khaira then made his professional debut with the Oilers' AHL affiliate, the Oklahoma City Barons, joining the club for their postseason run.

In the second year of his entry-level contract, Khaira and the Oilers AHL affiliation moved to the new Bakersfield Condors. During this 2015–16 NHL season, Khaira was called up to the Oilers on November 26, 2015, playing his first NHL game against the Pittsburgh Penguins on November 28. This made Khaira only the third player of Punjabi Indian descent to play in the NHL, after Robin Bawa and Manny Malhotra. Khaira played 15 games at the NHL level that season, recording two assists.

Khaira was a regular with the Condors for the 2016–17 season, and was occasionally called up to the NHL. During his second NHL game that season, on January 16, 2017, Khaira scored his first NHL goal, against Mike Smith of the Arizona Coyotes. On December 9, he earned his first multi-goal game, scoring twice against Carey Price of the Montreal Canadiens.

Following the 2020–21 season, his sixth season in Edmonton, Khaira as a pending restricted free agent was not tendered a qualifying offer by the Oilers on July 26, 2021. On July 28, Khaira signed a two-year, $1.95 million deal with the Chicago Blackhawks. His first season in Chicago was marred with injuries. Khaira missed nearly a month after suffering a concussion following a collision with Jacob Trouba on December 7. He suffered a back injury nine games after returning that required season-ending surgery. Khaira finished the season with three goals in 27 games for the Blackhawks.

On September 17, 2023, Khaira signed a one-year, two-way contract with the Minnesota Wild. Minnesota recalled Khaira on October 26, from the Iowa Wild.

On September 6, 2024, Khaira signed a one-year, American Hockey League contract with the Syracuse Crunch, the primary affiliate to the Tampa Bay Lightning. In the 2024–25 season, Khaira added a veteran presence to the Crunch forward corps, notching 3 goals and 9 points through 18 appearances. On March 8, 2025, Khaira was traded by the Crunch to the Abbotsford Canucks in exchange for future considerations.

== Personal life ==
Khaira is a Sikh, and the third NHL player of Indian or Punjabi descent, following Robin Bawa (starting in 1989) and Manny Malhotra (starting in 1998).

Khaira's parents were prominent volleyball players in British Columbia during the 1980s. His brother, Sahvan Khaira, attended the University of Calgary and formerly played for university's Calgary Dinos ice hockey team.

== Career statistics ==
			Regular season					Playoffs
Season	Team	League	GP	G	A	Pts	PIM	GP	G	A	Pts	PIM
2010–11	Prince George Spruce Kings	BCHL	58	10	32	42	21	—	—	—	—	—
2011–12	Prince George Spruce Kings	BCHL	54	29	50	79	69	4	0	2	2	2
2012–13	Michigan Tech	WCHA	37	6	19	25	49	—	—	—	—	—
2013–14	Everett Silvertips	WHL	59	16	27	43	59	5	3	1	4	8
2013–14	Oklahoma City Barons	AHL	6	0	0	0	2	3	1	0	1	0
2014–15	Oklahoma City Barons	AHL	51	4	6	10	62	8	3	1	4	4
2015–16	Bakersfield Condors	AHL	49	10	17	27	69	—	—	—	—	—
2015–16	Edmonton Oilers	NHL	15	0	2	2	13	—	—	—	—	—
2016–17	Bakersfield Condors	AHL	27	8	12	20	31	—	—	—	—	—
2016–17	Edmonton Oilers	NHL	10	1	0	1	2	—	—	—	—	—
2017–18	Edmonton Oilers	NHL	69	11	10	21	47	—	—	—	—	—
2018–19	Edmonton Oilers	NHL	60	3	15	18	43	—	—	—	—	—
2019–20	Edmonton Oilers	NHL	64	6	4	10	38	4	0	0	0	2
2020–21	Edmonton Oilers	NHL	40	3	8	11	42	4	1	0	1	6
2021–22	Chicago Blackhawks	NHL	27	3	0	3	13	—	—	—	—	—
2022–23	Chicago Blackhawks	NHL	51	6	8	14	31	—	—	—	—	—
2023–24	Iowa Wild	AHL	22	5	13	18	10	—	—	—	—	—
2023–24	Minnesota Wild	NHL	1	0	0	0	0	—	—	—	—	—
2024–25	Syracuse Crunch	AHL	18	3	6	9	19	—	—	—	—	—
2024–25	Abbotsford Canucks	AHL	17	3	5	8	16	24	3	6	9	31
2025–26	Abbotsford Canucks	AHL	42	3	6	9	51	—	—	—	—	—
NHL totals			337	33	47	80	229	8	1	0	1	8

== Awards and honours ==
Award	Year	Ref
AHL
Calder Cup Champion	2025	

== See also ==
- List of Indian NHL players
