= Matt Dumba =

Canadian ice hockey player (born 1994)

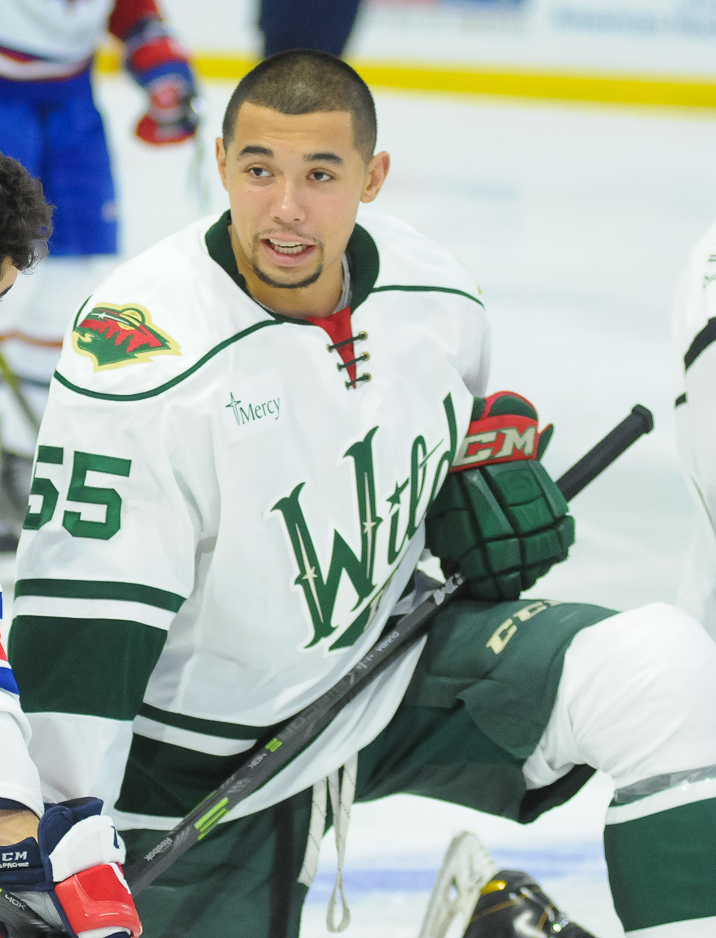
- Dumba with the Iowa Wild in 2015
- Born: July 25, 1994 (age 32) Regina, Saskatchewan, Canada
- Height: 6 ft 0 in (183 cm)
- Weight: 191 lb (87 kg; 13 st 9 lb)
- Position: Defence
- Shot: Right
- Played for: Minnesota Wild; Arizona Coyotes; Tampa Bay Lightning; Dallas Stars; Pittsburgh Penguins
- National team: Canada
- NHL draft: 7th overall, 2012; Minnesota Wild
- Playing career: 2013–2026

Mathew Dumba (born July 25, 1994) is a Canadian former professional ice hockey defenceman. Dumba was selected with the seventh overall pick by the Minnesota Wild in the first round of the 2012 NHL entry draft, with whom he spent his first ten seasons. He has also played for the Arizona Coyotes, Tampa Bay Lightning, Dallas Stars, and Pittsburgh Penguins. Dumba previously played junior with the Red Deer Rebels and briefly for the Portland Winterhawks of the Western Hockey League (WHL).

== Early life ==
Dumba is of Filipino (maternal) and Romanian and German (paternal) descent. He was born in Regina, Saskatchewan, and learned to skate at age three. His family later moved to Calgary, Alberta, where he played his minor hockey in Calgary with the Crowchild Minor Hockey Association. Dumba spent the 2009–10 season with the Edge School for Athletes in the Canadian Sport School Hockey League.

== Playing career ==
=== Amateur ===
The Red Deer Rebels of the Western Hockey League (WHL) selected Dumba with their first-round selection, fourth overall, in the 2009 WHL Bantam Draft from the Calgary Bronks AAA Organization. He made his WHL debut in 2009–10, his 15-year-old season, appearing in six regular season games and two playoff games for the Rebels. Joining the Rebels full-time in 2010–11, Dumba scored 15 goals and 26 points and was a player whom his coach said was noticeable every time he was on the ice. His performance during the season earned Dumba the Jim Piggott Memorial Trophy as the WHL's rookie-of-the-year.

Returning to the Rebels for the 2011–12 WHL season, Dumba scored 20 goals and 57 points in 69 games. He was the youngest player invited to the selection camp for the 2012 World Junior Hockey Championship, however he failed to make the team. However, he continued to impress scouts and observers with his play. Don Hay was one of several WHL coaches to praise Dumba for his enthusiasm on the ice and hard-checking style: "He's a guy who can do all aspects of the game ... he's a very dynamic player with or without the puck. Yes, he can lay out a good bodycheck, but he can also score the overtime winning goal."

Dumba's play in the WHL resulted in him being rated as one of the top prospects for the 2012 NHL entry draft. NHL Central Scouting ranked him as the 11th best prospect for the draft, while International Scouting Services ranked him 5th overall. The Minnesota Wild selected him in the first round, seventh overall, and signed him to an NHL contract a month later. Dumba was returned to the Rebels to begin the 2012–13 WHL season, in part due to a labour dispute between the NHL and its players. When the NHL's dispute was resolved, the Wild intended to give him a brief look at their training camp. Dumba impressed the team's coaching staff enough to earn a spot on the Wild's opening-night roster, however, he was returned to Red Deer four games into the NHL season without having played with the Wild.

=== Professional ===
==== Minnesota Wild ====
Dumba earned a spot in the Wild lineup to start the 2013–14 season and made his NHL debut on October 5, 2013, against the Anaheim Ducks, becoming the second player of Filipino descent to play in the NHL, after Tim Stapleton. He scored his first NHL goal on October 12 against Dan Ellis of the Dallas Stars. He recorded only two points in 13 games by December and the Wild loaned Dumba to the Canadian junior team for the 2014 World Junior Ice Hockey Championships. While Dumba was with the national team, the Rebels traded his WHL rights to the Portland Winterhawks and the Wild assigned him to Portland upon his return from the World Junior Championship.

In the 2015–16 season, Dumba had a breakout year, playing every game but one with the Minnesota Wild, seeing career highs in goals, assists, points, and penalty minutes with 10 goals, 16 assists, 26 points and 38 PIMS. The Wild also played an outdoor game against the Chicago Blackhawks at TCF Bank Stadium as part of the NHL Stadium Series. Dumba got the scoring going early as he trailed the play after Ryan Carter had a breakaway, Carter had his shot saved and his rebound saved as well but Dumba poked in the third chance for his ninth goal of the season to give the Wild a 1–0 lead. The Wild went on to beat the Blackhawks 6–1. He played 81 out of the 82 games that season, missing only a 3–0 loss to the San Jose Sharks as a healthy scratch by coach John Torchetti.

On July 28, 2016, he re-signed to a two-year, $5.1M bridge deal with the Wild. After not getting off to a good start for the Wild, new head coach Bruce Boudreau opted to scratch Dumba on October 20 against the Toronto Maple Leafs. The plan was foiled, however, when Marco Scandella became sick, forcing Dumba into the lineup. After that he played alongside All-Star defenseman Ryan Suter on the first defensive pairing and saw increased responsibilities and ice time. He averaged 21:48 per game alongside Suter. His 2017–18 season saw Dumba set new personal bests with 14 goals, 36 assists, and 50 points. On July 21, 2018, Dumba signed a five-year, $30 million contract extension with the Wild, carrying an annual average of $6 million.

On June 8, 2020, Dumba became an inaugural executive board member of the Hockey Diversity Alliance, whose goal is to address intolerance and racism in hockey. Dumba was named the 2020 King Clancy Award winner by the NHL for his efforts supporting community initiatives in Minneapolis and as a member of the Hockey Diversity Alliance. During the 2022–23 season, Dumba scored four goals and 14 points in 79 games and was third in ice time among Wild defencemen.

==== Arizona Coyotes ====
After the Wild chose to not re-sign Dumba during the 2023 off-season, Dumba signed as an unrestricted free agent to a one-year, $3.9 million contract with the Arizona Coyotes on August 7, 2023. Dumba made his Arizona debut on October 13, 2023 versus the New Jersey Devils. He scored his first goal in a Coyotes' uniform on Akira Schmid to open the scoring in the 4–3 victory over the Devils. He played in 58 games for Arizona, scoring four goals and ten points.

==== Tampa Bay Lightning ====
On March 8, 2024, the Coyotes traded Dumba along with a 2025 seventh-round pick to the Tampa Bay Lightning in exchange for a 2027 fifth-round pick. He made his Lightning debut on March 9 in a 7–0 victory over the Philadelphia Flyers. Dumba recorded his first point with the Lightning, an assist on Michael Eyssimont's goal in the first period, in a 7–4 win over the Montreal Canadiens on April 4, 2024. He played in 18 regular season games with Tampa Bay, registering two points. Dumba made his 2024 Stanley Cup playoffs debut with the Lightning on April 21 in 3–2 loss to the Florida Panthers in the opening round. He played in five playoff games with the Lightning, finishing second on the team in blocked shots with seven as the Lightning were eliminated from the postseason.

==== Dallas Stars ====
On July 1, 2024, Dumba signed as an unrestricted free agent to a two-year, $7.5 million contract with the Dallas Stars.

==== Pittsburgh Penguins and retirement ====
One year into his tenure with Dallas, Dumba was traded to the Pittsburgh Penguins on July 10, 2025, alongside a second-round draft pick in 2028, in exchange for Vladislav Kolyachonok.

On December 12, 2025, Dumba was waived by the Pittsburgh Penguins and after going unclaimed, reported to their AHL affiliate, the Wilkes-Barre/Scranton Penguins. Prior to the 2025–26 AHL playoffs on April 16, 2026, the Penguins placed Dumba on unconditional waivers for the purposes of terminating his contract.

Dumba announced his retirement from professional hockey on October 9, 2026.

== International play ==
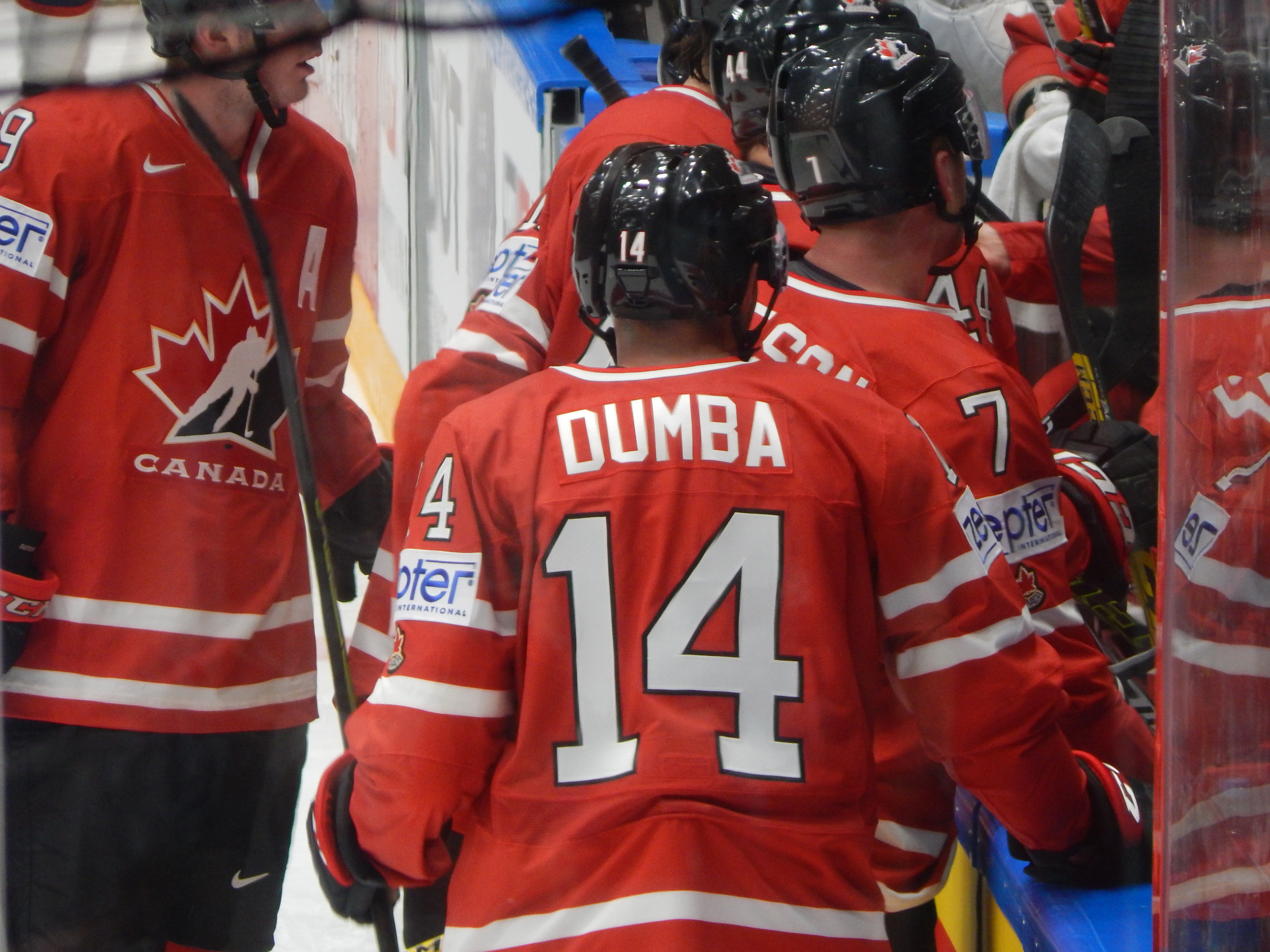

Medal record

Representing Canada

Ice hockey

World U18 Championships
Bronze medal – third place	2012 Czech Republic	

IIHF World Championship
Gold medal – first place	2016 Russia	

Dumba made his debut with the national team program at the 2011 Ivan Hlinka Memorial Tournament. He was named captain of the under-18 national team and led Canada to a gold medal victory.

The 18-year-old Dumba participated in his second national junior team camp ahead of the 2013 World Junior Championship, but was among the final cuts and did not make the team. Dumba was loaned from the Wild to the Canadian junior team for the 2014 World Junior Ice Hockey Championships. He narrowly avoided a suspension after being ejected from a pre-tournament game for kneeing a Swedish opponent, and recorded one assist in seven tournament games for the fourth-place Canadians.

Following the 2015–16 season, Dumba made his first appearance with Canada's national men's team, playing in all ten games at the 2016 World Championships where Canada repeated as gold medallists.

== Activism ==
After the murder of George Floyd, some NHL players formed the Hockey Diversity Alliance, which Dumba joined. On August 1, 2020, Dumba became the first player to kneel during the U.S. national anthem. Though he was a member of the Minnesota Wild, he was not playing that night. Two Black players from the teams who were playing placed their hands on his shoulders while he knelt: Malcolm Subban of the Chicago Blackhawks and Darnell Nurse of the Edmonton Oilers. The three of them remained in this position during both the American and Canadian national anthems. Dumba then gave a speech about racism while the screens in the rink displayed the messaged "END RACISM."

== Career statistics ==
=== Regular season and playoffs ===
			Regular season					Playoffs
Season	Team	League	GP	G	A	Pts	PIM	GP	G	A	Pts	PIM
2009–10	Red Deer Rebels	WHL	6	0	2	2	4	2	0	0	0	4
2010–11	Red Deer Rebels	WHL	62	15	11	26	83	9	2	0	2	20
2011–12	Red Deer Rebels	WHL	69	20	37	57	67	—	—	—	—	—
2012–13	Red Deer Rebels	WHL	62	16	26	42	80	9	2	2	4	14
2012–13	Houston Aeros	AHL	3	0	0	0	2	5	0	0	0	0
2013–14	Minnesota Wild	NHL	13	1	1	2	2	—	—	—	—	—
2013–14	Portland Winterhawks	WHL	26	8	16	24	37	21	8	10	18	33
2014–15	Minnesota Wild	NHL	58	8	8	16	23	10	2	2	4	2
2014–15	Iowa Wild	AHL	20	5	9	14	6	—	—	—	—	—
2015–16	Minnesota Wild	NHL	81	10	16	26	38	6	0	2	2	6
2016–17	Minnesota Wild	NHL	76	11	23	34	59	5	0	0	0	2
2017–18	Minnesota Wild	NHL	82	14	36	50	41	5	1	1	2	4
2018–19	Minnesota Wild	NHL	32	12	10	22	21	—	—	—	—	—
2019–20	Minnesota Wild	NHL	69	6	18	24	41	4	0	1	1	2
2020–21	Minnesota Wild	NHL	51	6	15	21	46	7	1	2	3	17
2021–22	Minnesota Wild	NHL	57	7	20	27	47	6	1	0	1	2
2022–23	Minnesota Wild	NHL	79	4	10	14	81	6	0	2	2	4
2023–24	Arizona Coyotes	NHL	58	4	6	10	55	—	—	—	—	—
2023–24	Tampa Bay Lightning	NHL	18	0	2	2	33	5	0	0	0	0
2024–25	Dallas Stars	NHL	63	1	9	10	60	—	—	—	—	—
2025–26	Pittsburgh Penguins	NHL	11	1	2	3	11	—	—	—	—	—
2025–26	Wilkes-Barre/Scranton Penguins	AHL	27	6	14	20	43	—	—	—	—	—
NHL totals			748	85	176	261	558	54	5	10	15	39

=== International ===
Year	Team	Event	Result	GP	G	A	Pts	PIM
2011	Canada	IH18	1st place, gold medalist(s)	5	2	1	3	2
2012	Canada	U18	3rd place, bronze medalist(s)	7	5	7	12	20
2014	Canada	WJC	4th	7	0	1	1	12
2016	Canada	WC	1st place, gold medalist(s)	10	1	1	2	2
Junior totals				19	7	9	16	34
Senior totals				10	1	1	2	2

== Awards and honours ==
Award	Year	Ref
WHL
Jim Piggott Memorial Trophy	2010–11	
NHL
King Clancy Memorial Trophy	2019–20	

Awards and achievements
Preceded by Ryan Nugent-Hopkins	Winner of the Jim Piggott Memorial Trophy; 2010–11	Succeeded by Sam Reinhart
Preceded by Zack Phillips	Minnesota Wild first-round draft pick 2012	Succeeded by Alex Tuch
Preceded by Jason Zucker	King Clancy Memorial Trophy winner 2020	Succeeded by Pekka Rinne
