= Hockey Diversity Alliance =

Group of current and former NHL players fighting racism

- Formation: June 8, 2020; 6 years ago
- Region served: North America
- Website: hockeydiversityalliance.org

The Hockey Diversity Alliance is a group of current and former National Hockey League players aiming to fight racism in ice hockey.

== History ==
The Alliance was founded in June 2020, with Akim Aliu and Evander Kane acting as co-heads.

On August 1, 2020, Matt Dumba, a Filipino-Canadian member of the Alliance, became the first player to kneel during the U.S. national anthem. Though he was a member of the Minnesota Wild, he was not playing that night. Two Black players from the teams who were playing placed their hands on his shoulders while he knelt: Malcolm Subban of the Chicago Blackhawks and Darnell Nurse of the Edmonton Oilers. The three of them remained in this position during both the American and Canadian national anthems. Dumba then gave a speech about racial equality while the screens in the rink displayed the messaged "END RACISM."

In August 2020, the Alliance announced a set of actions for the NHL to tackle racism in the league, including increasing the number of Black executives within the league, mandatory anti-racism training for all league employees, and financial support for social justice initiatives. The Alliance had successfully called for the league to suspend games following the Shooting of Jacob Blake.

In September 2020, the NHL and the NHLPA announced a partnership with the Alliance to create a grassroots hockey development programme aimed toward young players of colour in the Toronto area. Later that month, after being named to the board of the PWHPA, Canadian Olympian Sarah Nurse stated that while she has had some conversations with the Alliance, she was "disappointed that there hasn't been female representation, not only on the board, but really in any of it."

In October 2020, the Alliance announced that it was cutting formal ties with the NHL over the league's failure to make any concrete commitments or actions.

In January 2022, the Alliance launched its #TapeOutHate campaign. Partnered with Budweiser Canada, the video accompanying the campaign brings attention to racist incidents players have had to endure.

== See also ==
- Black players in ice hockey
