= Manny Malhotra =

Canadian ice hockey player (born 1980)

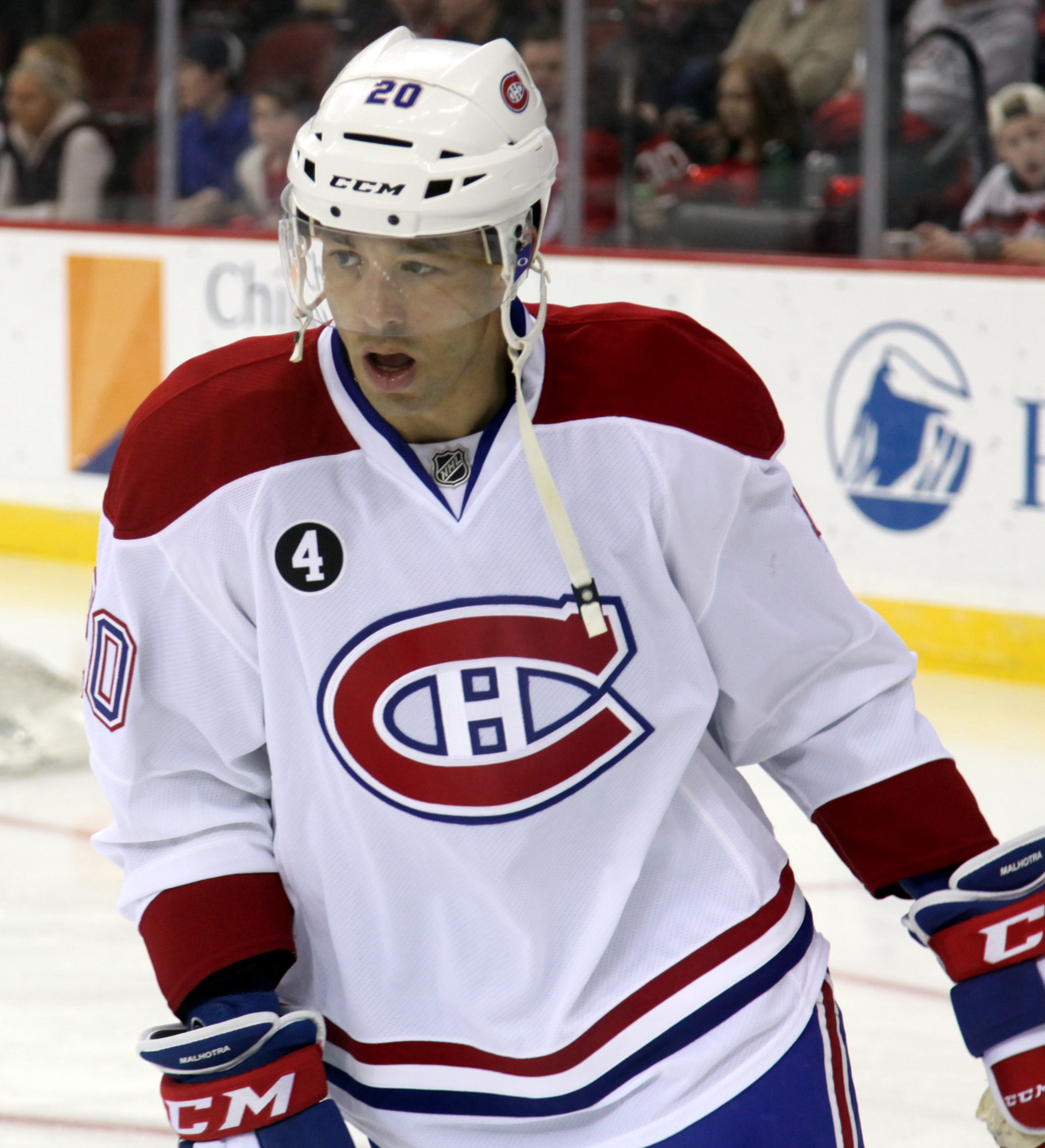
- Malhotra with the Montreal Canadiens in 2015
- Born: May 18, 1980 (age 46) Mississauga, Ontario, Canada
- Height: 6 ft 2 in (188 cm)
- Weight: 220 lb (100 kg; 15 st 10 lb)
- Position: Centre
- Shot: Left
- Played for: New York Rangers; Dallas Stars; Columbus Blue Jackets; HDD Olimpija Ljubljana; HV71; San Jose Sharks; Vancouver Canucks; Carolina Hurricanes; Montreal Canadiens
- Current NHL coach: Vancouver Canucks
- National team: Canada
- NHL draft: 7th overall, 1998; New York Rangers
- Playing career: 1998–2016
- Coaching career: 2016–present

Emmanuel "Manny" Noveen Malhotra (born May 18, 1980) is a Canadian professional ice hockey coach and former player who is the head coach for the Vancouver Canucks of the National Hockey League (NHL).

During his 18-year career, he played as a centre for the Montreal Canadiens, Carolina Hurricanes, Vancouver Canucks, San Jose Sharks, Columbus Blue Jackets, Dallas Stars, and New York Rangers. Malhotra was known as a two-way forward and for his faceoff proficiency, in which he won over 56% of faceoffs he took in the NHL.

== Playing career ==
Malhotra was drafted in the first round as the seventh overall pick of the 1998 NHL entry draft by the New York Rangers. He joined the NHL after a two-year career in the Ontario Hockey League (OHL) with the Guelph Storm, where he served as captain in his final year. Winning a J. Ross Robertson Cup championship and subsequently appearing in the 1998 Memorial Cup with the Storm, Malhotra also earned a Bobby Smith Trophy, George Parsons Trophy and Memorial Cup All-Star honours as a junior.

He played with the Rangers from 1998 to 2002. During this time he was assigned on numerous occasions to the team's AHL affiliate, the Hartford Wolf Pack, with whom he won a Calder Cup championship in 2000. At the 2001–02 trade deadline, he was dealt to the Stars and spent parts of three seasons with the club. Beginning in 2003–04, Malhotra began to see increased offensive production, marked by his acquisition off waivers by the Blue Jackets. After four seasons in Columbus, he signed a one-year contract with the Sharks in September 2009. He recorded a career-high in goals with San Jose, before joining the Canucks on a three-year deal. In his first season with Vancouver, Malhotra suffered a major injury to his left eye, requiring several surgeries. Despite having lost a significant amount of his vision, he returned the same year to compete in the 2011 Stanley Cup Finals. He struggled to play with the injury until Canucks management placed him on the injured reserve for the remainder of the 2012–13 season in February 2013.

Internationally, Malhotra has represented Canada in under-18 competition, two World Junior Championships and one World Championship. Serving as team captain at the 2000 World Junior Championships, Malhotra led Canada to a bronze medal.

=== Guelph Storm ===
Malhotra played in the 1994 Quebec International Pee-Wee Hockey Tournament with the Mississauga Reps minor ice hockey team. After his time in the Metro Toronto Hockey League (MTHL), Malhotra was selected in the first round (17th overall) of the 1996 OHL Priority Selection, Malhotra played two seasons in the Ontario Hockey League (OHL) with the Guelph Storm, beginning in 1996–97. He scored 16 goals and 44 points over 61 games in his rookie season. In the 1997 playoffs, he added 14 points in 18 games as Guelph lost in the semi-finals to the Ottawa 67's. The following season, he improved to 16 goals and 51 points over 57 games. He served as team captain while being assigned the primary role of shutting down opposing team's top forwards. Guelph advanced to the OHL Finals, where they defeated Ottawa in five games to capture the J. Ross Robertson Cup. Malhotra had 13 points in 12 games in the championship-winning playoff season. Earning a berth into the 1998 Memorial Cup, Guelph made it to the final, where they lost to the Portland Winter Hawks 4–3 in overtime. Malhotra ranked third in tournament scoring with a goal and seven points over five games. He was named to the Memorial Cup All-Star Team and was awarded the George Parsons Trophy as the tournament's most sportsmanlike player.

=== New York Rangers (1998–2002) ===
In the off-season, Malhotra was drafted by the New York Rangers in the first round, seventh overall, of the 1998 NHL entry draft. The Rangers scouted him as a strong, physical player with good hockey sense and character, comparing him to Adam Graves. He was surprised to have been selected by the Rangers, as they were one of the only teams to have not interviewed or met with him prior to the draft. He anticipated being drafted by the Calgary Flames at sixth overall, as the team's general manager, Al Coates, had previously drafted him into the OHL as general manager of the Storm.

With the 1998–99 season approaching, Malhotra had not yet signed an NHL contract with the Rangers by October. League rules stipulated that if he did not sign by October 8, 1998, he would be required to return to junior for the entire campaign. The night before the deadline, Malhotra and the Rangers agreed to a three-year deal worth the rookie maximum of $975,000 with performance-based incentives that could have increased his salary to $2 million. Making the immediate jump from junior to the NHL at age 18, he became the second player of Indian heritage to play in the NHL. Malhotra recorded 8 goals and 16 points over 73 games as a rookie.

During the season, the Rangers were interested in acquiring Vancouver Canucks forward Pavel Bure. It was reported that Canucks general manager Brian Burke had requested Malhotra to be involved in a trade that would have sent him along with Niklas Sundström, Dan Cloutier and the Rangers' first-round pick in the 1999 draft in exchange for Bure. However, Rangers general manager Neil Smith refused to include Malhotra and the deal never materialized.

The following season, Malhotra struggled to earn a regular spot on the Rangers' roster and was often a healthy scratch. Rangers head coach John Muckler publicly declared before the beginning of Malhotra's second NHL campaign that he would be nothing more than a career third-liner. Malhotra's potential was often at the centre of an ongoing dispute between Muckler and Smith.

Malhotra suffered an ankle injury in November that sidelined him for four games. Upon his recovery, his play was judged by team management to have suffered and he began to be benched. Meanwhile, the Canadian national junior team wanted the Rangers to loan him to them for the 2000 World Junior Championships. On December 12, 1999, general manager Neil Smith obliged and assigned Malhotra for the international tournament. He was then sent for a two-week conditioning assignment with the Rangers' American Hockey League (AHL) affiliate, the Hartford Wolf Pack. On March 14, 2000, he was sent back down to the OHL in order to retain his eligibility for later AHL assignment in the season. Malhotra had dressed for only four games in the two months between his return from the World Junior Championships in early-January and his junior reassignment. He was pointless in the 27 games total he played with the Rangers that season.

Returning to Guelph, he played in five regular season and six playoff games. Upon his junior club's first-round playoff elimination, he was reassigned to the Wolf Pack where he recorded 1 goal and 6 points over 12 games to finish the regular season. He then added 3 points in 23 post-season contests, helping the Wolf Pack to the franchise's first Calder Cup championship.

Malhotra returned to the Wolf Pack the following season after failing to make the Rangers' roster out of training camp. With New York deep at the centre position, his AHL assignment was predicated on him learning to play wing. He received numerous call-ups to New York and finished the 2000–01 campaign with 11 points over 28 games in the AHL and 12 points over 50 games in the NHL. The season also marked a management change as Glen Sather took over as general manager, marking the departure of Smith, who had drafted Malhotra and regarded him as untradeable during his tenure.

Fifty-six games into his 2001–02 season with the Rangers, Sather dealt Malhotra to the Dallas Stars at the trade deadline, along with winger Barrett Heisten, in exchange for forwards Martin Ručinský and Roman Lyashenko. Although he had established himself as an effective forechecker and defensive forward, Malhotra did not materialize into the offensive player the Rangers hoped he would be.

=== Dallas Stars (2002–2004) ===
Malhotra welcomed the trade to Dallas as an opportunity for more playing time, as he was sparsely used with the Rangers. However, he saw limited success with the Stars. Following his trade, he recorded one point, a goal, in 16 games to finish the 2001–02 season. He was re-signed by Dallas to a two-year contract on June 27, 2002. In 2002–03, he recorded 10 points over 59 games. He appeared in his first Stanley Cup playoffs as the Stars qualified for the 2003 post-season as the top seed in the Western Conference. They were eliminated in the second round by the Mighty Ducks of Anaheim.

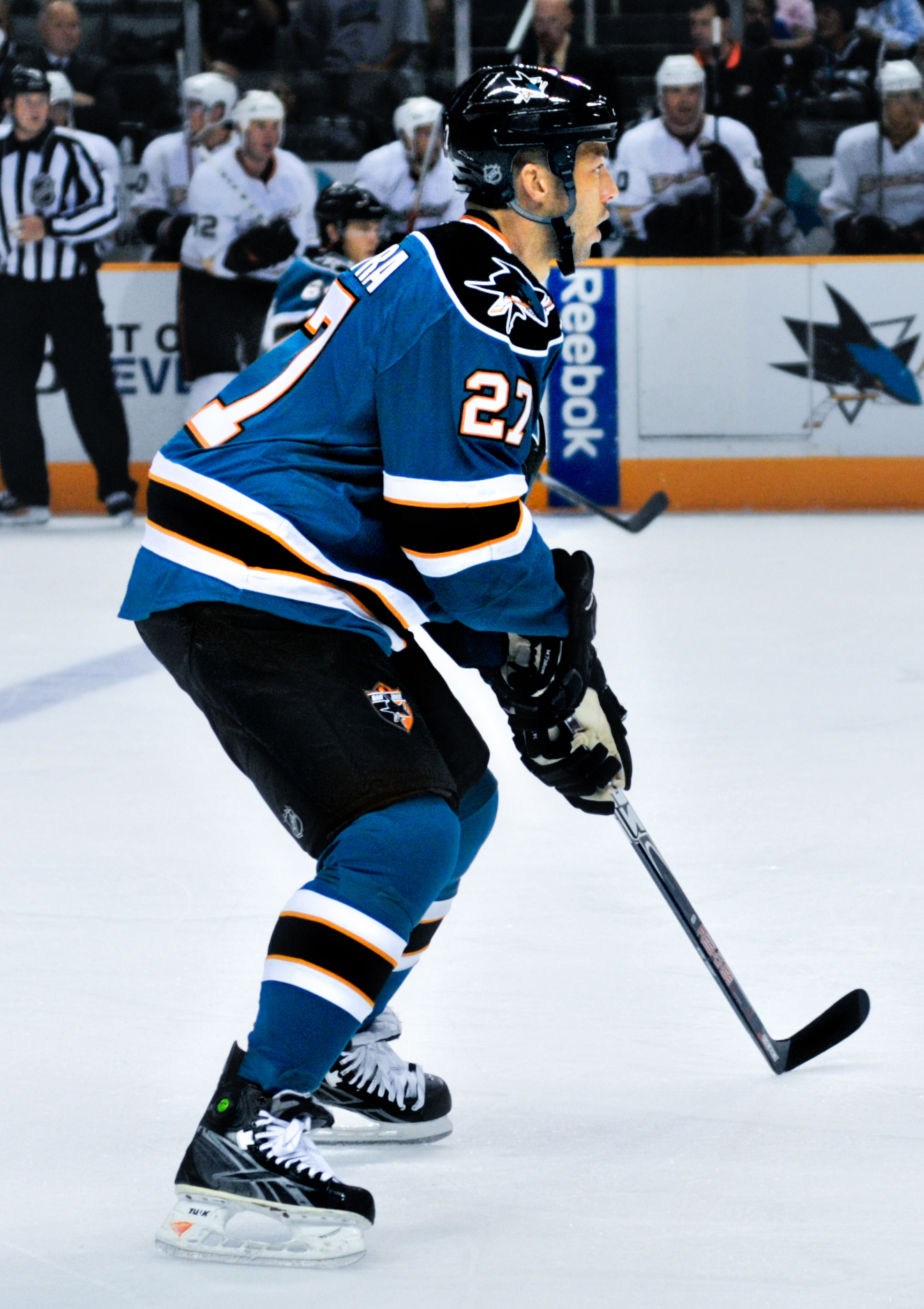
Malhotra during his tenure with the San Jose Sharks in September 2009

=== Columbus Blue Jackets (2004–2009) ===
After going pointless in nine games early the following season, the Stars waived Malhotra on November 19, 2003. Two days later, he was picked up by the Columbus Blue Jackets. Malhotra improved with the Blue Jackets, notching 12 goals and 25 points over 56 games following the trade. He missed the final six games of the regular season with a bruised ankle. His ice time rose from an average of nine minutes a game with Dallas the previous season to 14 minutes in Columbus.

Due to the NHL lockout, Malhotra spent the 2004–05 season overseas in Europe. He initially signed with HDD Olimpija Ljubljana of Slovenia on October 8, 2004, and recorded 27 points over 26 games (including both Slovenian league and inter-league play). On December 12, he signed with HV71 of the Swedish Elite League. He notched seven points in 20 games with the club.

Returning to Columbus as NHL resumed play the following season, Malhotra spent 2005–06 centering Columbus' third line. Despite missing 24 games due to injury with back spasms in November and a shoulder injury in January, he improved his points total for the second-straight NHL season with 10 goals and 21 assists. The Blue Jackets re-signed him in the off-season to a three-year contract on June 20, 2006. In the first year of his new contract, he tallied nine goals and 25 points over a full 82-game season.

Malhotra missed 11 games with a recurring knee injury in December 2007. Late in the 2007–08 season, on March 17, 2008, he recorded a career-high three points in one game (two goals and an assist) in a 4–3 win against the Detroit Red Wings. He finished the campaign with 11 goals, 18 assists and 29 points in 77 games. Early in the 2008–09 season, Malhotra missed five games with a lower-body injury. He recorded a career-high 24 assists and 35 points over 77 games during the campaign. As Columbus was plagued with numerous injuries over the course of the season, Malhotra was used on various lines while also in a shutdown role, playing against top opposing forwards.

=== San Jose Sharks (2009–2010) ===
His contract was not renewed by the Blue Jackets in the 2009 off-season and he became an unrestricted free agent. After failing to sign with an NHL team, Malhotra accepted an invitation to the San Jose Sharks' training camp on September 17, 2009. Five days later, he signed a one-year, $700,000 deal with the team. He went on to record a career-high 14 goals and +17 rating, along with 19 assists for 33 points, in his only season with the Sharks. He centred the team's third line and earned time playing wing on the powerplay. However, the Sharks did not re-sign him and he became an unrestricted free agent for the second consecutive summer on July 1, 2010. Looking back on his time in San Jose, Malhotra called it the "most enjoyable season [he's] had as a pro", being able to play for a winning team and have a long playoff run for the first time in his NHL career.

=== Vancouver Canucks (2010–2013) ===
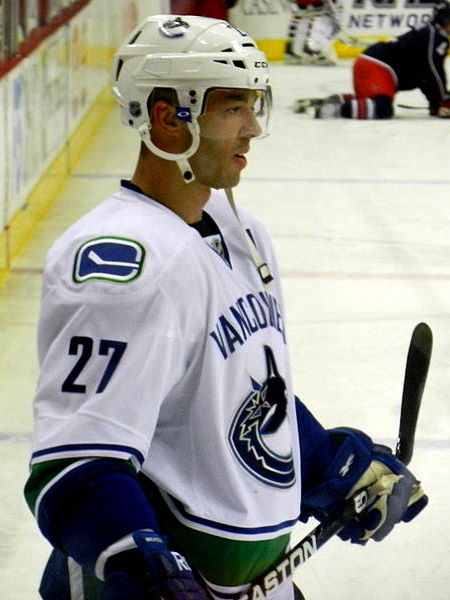
Malhotra with the Vancouver Canucks in December 2011

On the first day of free agency on July 1, 2010, Malhotra signed a three-year, $7.5 million deal with the Vancouver Canucks that included a no-trade clause. Malhotra was named an alternate captain during away games for the Canucks before the season began. He scored his first goal as a Canuck on October 22, during a 5–1 win against the Minnesota Wild.

Malhotra settled into the Canucks' lineup as the team's third-line centre, often playing with wingers Raffi Torres and Jannik Hansen, while playing significant time on the penalty kill and matching up against opposing team's best forwards. His success as a defensive specialist earned him early consideration for the Frank J. Selke Trophy as the league's best two-way forward. In an article on the NHL's website, he was chosen as the front-runner for the award at the mid-way point of the campaign. He was also credited with allowing the team to use centre Ryan Kesler in a more offensive role (Kesler was the team's previous shutdown centre); as a result, the second-line centre recorded career-highs in goals and points.

During a game against the Colorado Avalanche on March 16, 2011, Malhotra was struck in the eye by a deflected puck from Avalanche defenseman Erik Johnson. He immediately left the ice and underwent eye surgery the following day. It was announced on March 21, that Malhotra would not be returning to the lineup for the rest of the regular season and the playoffs, without further comment on Malhotra's condition. Eight days later, he underwent a second successful surgery on his eye.

Limited to 72 games, Malhotra recorded his third consecutive 30-point season with 11 goals and 19 assists while playing on the Canucks' third line alongside Raffi Torres and Jannik Hansen. His 61.7% faceoff percentage ranked second in the league behind David Steckel. The campaign also included the 100th goal of his NHL career, scored in a 3–0 win against the Anaheim Ducks on March 6, 2011.

On a team basis, Malhotra's first season with the Canucks saw them earn the Presidents' Trophy for having the best regular season record in the league. In the midst of his recovery, Malhotra made an appearance during the team's pre-game ceremony at Rogers Arena, co-accepting the trophy with captain Henrik Sedin. Despite original statements from the team that he would not return for the playoffs, Malhotra began to gradually work his way up from light practices with the team in May 2011. By the end of the month, he was cleared by doctors to play in the Stanley Cup Finals against the Boston Bruins after missing the first three rounds against the Chicago Blackhawks, Nashville Predators and San Jose Sharks, respectively.

Though he remained out of the lineup for Game 1, he returned for Game 2 and played the rest of the series as the team's fourth-line centre (late-season acquisition Maxim Lapierre filled in for Malhotra on the third line), with the Canucks ultimately falling to the Bruins with a 4-0 loss in game 7 of the series. Malhotra's regular season performance earned him six first-place votes out of 125 for the Selke Trophy. (Note: He also earned 10 second-place, 10 third-place, 14 fourth-place and 7 fifth-place votes) He ranked fifth in balloting, as teammate Ryan Kesler won the distinction at the year-end awards ceremony.

Malhotra struggled in 2011–12 due to having lost a significant amount of vision in his eye from his eye injury towards the end of the previous season. He was supplanted as the Canucks' third-line centre by rookie Cody Hodgson and later Samuel Påhlsson. (Note: Pahlsson was acquired at the trade deadline and assumed the third-line centre position in place of Hodgson, who had been dealt away.) Canucks head coach Alain Vigneault assessed Malhotra during the season as "not the same physical player he was before", adding, "He's still contributing but not maybe to the degree that he was before he got injured." Playing left wing on the fourth line, he remained an integral part of the team by playing on the penalty kill and taking important defensive zone faceoffs.

Near the end of the campaign, Malhotra was chosen as the Canucks' nominee for the Bill Masterton Trophy, an annual NHL award for perseverance, sportsmanship and dedication to hockey. With a diminished offensive role, Malhotra finished his second season in Vancouver with seven goals and 11 assists and 18 points in 78 games, as well as a –10 plus-minus rating while the Canucks as a team won their second consecutive Presidents' Trophy. However, he remained among the league's elite in terms of faceoffs, ranking fourth with a 58.5% winning percentage.

Continuing to struggle with his eye injury, Malhotra was put on the injured reserve a month into the 2012–13 season. Fearing for his long-term health, Canucks general manager Mike Gillis took him out of the lineup for the season, a decision that he described as the "hardest thing [he has] done in [his] job". Malhotra had appeared in nine games without recording a point.

=== Carolina Hurricanes (2013–2015) ===
After being unsigned by an NHL team at the start of the 2013–14 season and looking to continue his playing career, Malhotra signed a 25-game professional try out (PTO) contract with the AHL's Charlotte Checkers. The Carolina Hurricanes signed Malhotra to a one-year, two-way contract on October 31 and he made his Carolina debut against the New York Rangers on November 2. On November 6, he scored his first NHL goal in 19 months, scoring a game winner in overtime against the Philadelphia Flyers. As a measure of the amount of respect he earned in the locker room over a matter of weeks, Malhotra was selected to be an interim alternate captain while Tim Gleason was out with an injury. After Gleason was traded to the Toronto Maple Leafs, Malhotra was officially named an alternate captain for the remainder of the season.

=== Montreal Canadiens (2014–2015) ===
On July 1, 2014, Malhotra signed as a free agent to a one-year deal with the Montreal Canadiens. In the 2014–15 season, Malhotra was primarily used as the Canadiens' fourth-line centre and face-off specialist. On February 28, 2015, he scored his first and only goal with Montreal in his 53rd appearance, a 4–0 victory over the Toronto Maple Leafs. Malhotra completed the season scoring only four points (one goal, three assists) in 58 games. On May 15, three days after the Canadiens' second-round, six-game elimination from the 2015 playoffs by the Tampa Bay Lightning, it was announced by Canadiens general manager Marc Bergevin that Malhotra would not return to the Canadiens for the next season. In July 2015, Malhotra officially became a free agent and remained un-signed over the summer.

=== Later years (2015–2016) ===
Two months into the 2015–16 season, Malhotra returned to the Columbus Blue Jackets organization, signing a professional try-out contract with their American Hockey League affiliate, the Lake Erie Monsters, on December 3, 2015.

== Coaching career ==
On September 7, 2016, the Vancouver Canucks announced that Malhotra would join the team as a development coach. This was announced shortly following his retirement. On June 7, 2017, the Canucks announced that Malhotra was hired as assistant coach.

On September 17, 2020 he was hired as an assistant coach for the Toronto Maple Leafs. Malhotra returned to the Vancouver organization when he succeeded Jeremy Colliton as head coach of the Abbotsford Canucks on May 24, 2024. In his first season, he coached the Abbotsford Canucks to the franchise's first Calder Cup championship.

On June 1, 2026, Malhotra was named head coach of the Vancouver Canucks, succeeding Adam Foote.

== International career ==
Medal record

Men's ice hockey

Representing Canada

Spengler Cup
Gold medal – first place	2015 Davos	

World Junior Championship
Bronze medal – third place	2000 Sweden	

In the summer of 1997, Malhotra captained Canada's under-18 team to a championship at the 3 Nations Cup in the Czech Republic. Canada finished as tournament champions, going undefeated over six games against the Czech Republic and Slovakia in the three-country competition.

The following year, Malhotra was named to the Canadian national under-20 team for the 1998 World Junior Championships, held in Finland. He was the second-youngest player on the team, behind Vincent Lecavalier. Malhotra was pointless in seven games as Canada was defeated in the quarter-finals by Russia, 2–1. The following year, he was not available for the tournament as he was playing in the NHL with the Rangers. However, in 2000, he was loaned to Team Canada by the Rangers' organization, as he was still eligible as a junior. Serving as team captain, he notched two assists over seven games in the tournament, held in Sweden. Canada earned the bronze medal, defeating the United States 4–3 in a shootout.

Malhotra debuted with Canada's men's team at the 2002 World Championships in Sweden. He recorded no points in seven games as Canada was eliminated in the quarter-finals by Slovakia.

== Personal life ==
Emmanuel Malhotra was born and raised in Mississauga, Ontario. He was given the Hindu name Noveen. His Punjabi father, Shadi, was born in India and worked as a research chemist for Xerox at the Xerox Research Centre of Canada. His mother, Lise, is French-Canadian and also has a PhD in chemistry, but was a stay-at-home mom. Due to his mother's French background, he spoke both French and English at home. He is Catholic. Malhotra has two brothers and a sister.

Malhotra started playing organized hockey at age seven. He attended John Fraser Secondary School in Mississauga, before graduating from Our Lady of Lourdes in Guelph, Ontario. Malhotra moved to Guelph to begin his OHL career with the Guelph Storm, during which time he was awarded the Bobby Smith Trophy as the OHL's scholastic player of the year in 1998. He has referred to it as the award he is most proud of in his hockey career. In 2009, he received the National Leadership Award in a ceremony at his former high school in Guelph.

In his initial years with the Rangers, the organization arranged for him to live with former player Doug Sulliman and his family. In September 2007, Malhotra married Joann Nash, sister of National Basketball Association (NBA) star Steve Nash and former Vancouver Whitecaps FC midfielder Martin Nash and a soccer star herself, as captain of the University of Victoria women's soccer team. Malhotra and Joann have three sons. His son Caleb was drafted third overall by the Canucks in the 2026 NHL entry draft.

== Career statistics ==
=== Regular season and playoffs ===
			Regular season					Playoffs
Season	Team	League	GP	G	A	Pts	PIM	GP	G	A	Pts	PIM
1995–96	Mississauga Reps Bantam	GTHL	54	27	44	71	38	—	—	—	—	—
1996–97	Guelph Storm	OHL	61	16	28	44	26	18	7	7	14	11
1997–98	Guelph Storm	OHL	57	16	35	51	29	12	7	6	13	8
1998–99	New York Rangers	NHL	73	8	8	16	33	—	—	—	—	—
1999–00	Guelph Storm	OHL	5	2	2	4	4	6	0	2	2	4
1999–00	Hartford Wolf Pack	AHL	12	1	5	6	2	23	1	2	3	10
1999–00	New York Rangers	NHL	27	0	0	0	4	—	—	—	—	—
2000–01	Hartford Wolf Pack	AHL	28	5	6	11	69	5	0	0	0	0
2000–01	New York Rangers	NHL	50	4	8	12	31	—	—	—	—	—
2001–02	New York Rangers	NHL	56	7	6	13	42	—	—	—	—	—
2001–02	Dallas Stars	NHL	16	1	0	1	5	—	—	—	—	—
2002–03	Dallas Stars	NHL	59	3	7	10	42	5	1	0	1	0
2003–04	Dallas Stars	NHL	9	0	0	0	4	—	—	—	—	—
2003–04	Columbus Blue Jackets	NHL	56	12	13	25	24	—	—	—	—	—
2004–05	HDD Olimpija Ljubljana	IEL	13	7	7	14	16	—	—	—	—	—
2004–05	HDD Olimpija Ljubljana	SVN	13	6	7	13	20	—	—	—	—	—
2004–05	HV71	SEL	20	5	2	7	16	—	—	—	—	—
2005–06	Columbus Blue Jackets	NHL	58	10	21	31	41	—	—	—	—	—
2006–07	Columbus Blue Jackets	NHL	82	9	16	25	76	—	—	—	—	—
2007–08	Columbus Blue Jackets	NHL	71	11	18	29	34	—	—	—	—	—
2008–09	Columbus Blue Jackets	NHL	77	11	24	35	28	4	0	0	0	0
2009–10	San Jose Sharks	NHL	71	14	19	33	41	15	1	0	1	0
2010–11	Vancouver Canucks	NHL	72	11	19	30	22	6	0	0	0	0
2011–12	Vancouver Canucks	NHL	78	7	11	18	14	5	0	0	0	0
2012–13	Vancouver Canucks	NHL	9	0	0	0	0	—	—	—	—	—
2013–14	Charlotte Checkers	AHL	8	0	0	0	17	—	—	—	—	—
2013–14	Carolina Hurricanes	NHL	69	7	6	13	18	—	—	—	—	—
2014–15	Montreal Canadiens	NHL	58	1	3	4	12	—	—	—	—	—
2015–16	Lake Erie Monsters	AHL	23	4	2	6	6	—	—	—	—	—
NHL totals			991	116	179	295	451	35	2	0	2	0

=== International ===
Year	Team	Event	GP	G	A	Pts	PIM
1998	Canada	WJC	7	0	0	0	0
2000	Canada	WJC	7	0	2	2	8
2002	Canada	WC	7	0	0	0	4
Junior totals			14	0	2	2	8
Senior totals			7	0	0	0	4

== Awards ==
Award	Year
Bobby Smith Trophy (OHL's scholastic player of the year)	1998
George Parsons Trophy (Memorial Cup's most sportsmanlike player)	1998
Memorial Cup All-Star Team	1998
Calder Cup champion	2025

== See also ==
- List of Indian NHL players

== Notes ==
Awards and achievements
Preceded by Jake McCracken	Bobby Smith Trophy; 1998	Succeeded by Rob Zepp
Preceded by Radoslav Suchy	George Parsons Trophy; 1998	Succeeded by Brian Campbell
Sporting positions
Preceded by Stefan Cherneski	New York Rangers first-round draft pick 1998	Succeeded by Pavel Brendl
Preceded by Adam Foote	Head coach of the Vancouver Canucks; 2026–present	Incumbent
