= Robin Bawa =

Canadian ice hockey player (born 1966)

- Born: March 26, 1966 (age 60) Duncan, British Columbia, Canada
- Height: 6 ft 2 in (188 cm)
- Weight: 214 lb (97 kg; 15 st 4 lb)
- Position: Right wing
- Shot: Right
- Played for: Washington Capitals; Vancouver Canucks; San Jose Sharks; Mighty Ducks of Anaheim
- NHL draft: Undrafted
- Playing career: 1987–1999

Robin N. Bawa (born March 26, 1966) is a Canadian former professional ice hockey player who spent parts of four seasons in the National Hockey League (NHL) between 1989 and 1994. Bawa is the first person of Indian descent to play in the NHL.

== Playing career ==
Bawa spent five productive seasons of junior hockey in the Western Hockey League with the Kamloops Blazers, but was passed over in the NHL entry draft. Finally, after a 57-goal performance in the 1986–87 season, Bawa earned a pro contract from the Washington Capitals.

Bawa turned pro the following season, spending the year in the International Hockey League (IHL) with the Fort Wayne Komets. While Bawa had been primarily a skill player in junior, he began to fight more often in pro hockey and developed into an enforcer. He averaged over 200 penalty minutes in his first three years in Washington's system, finally earning a five-game callup to the Capitals in 1989–90, during which he scored his first NHL goal, against Alain Chevrier and the Chicago Blackhawks.

Bawa played one more season in the Capitals' system, posting 381 penalty minutes in Fort Wayne but not seeing any more NHL action, before being dealt to the Vancouver Canucks in 1991. He played two games for the Canucks in 1991–92, and set a career high with 27 goals in the IHL. He also dressed up for one game in the 1992 Stanley Cup Playoffs for the Canucks, his only playoff appearance in the NHL.

Early in the 1992–93 season, Bawa was dealt to the San Jose Sharks, where he had his most prolonged NHL stint. He spent most of the rest of the season in the NHL, scoring 5 goals in 42 games and posting 47 penalty minutes.

Bawa was exposed in the 1993 NHL Expansion Draft and claimed by the Mighty Ducks of Anaheim. He played 12 more NHL games in 1993–94, registering his only career assist.

Following his release from the Ducks, Bawa continued to toil in the IHL for five more seasons, three of those back in Fort Wayne, before a concussion ended his career near the end of the 1998–99 season. He finished his IHL career with 147 goals and 175 assists in 565 career games along with 1,869 penalty minutes.

Bawa is the first person of Indian descent to play in the NHL, where he achieved six goals and one assist in 61 games, while collecting 60 penalty minutes.

== Career statistics ==
=== Regular season and playoffs ===
			Regular season					Playoffs
Season	Team	League	GP	G	A	Pts	PIM	GP	G	A	Pts	PIM
1982–83	Kamloops Junior Oilers	WHL	66	10	24	34	17	7	1	2	3	0
1983–84	Kamloops Junior Oilers	WHL	64	16	28	44	40	13	4	2	6	4
1984–85	New Westminster Bruins	WHL	26	4	6	10	20	—	—	—	—	—
1984–85	Kamloops Blazers	WHL	26	2	13	15	25	15	4	9	13	14
1985–86	Kamloops Blazers	WHL	63	29	43	72	78	16	5	13	18	4
1986–87	Kamloops Blazers	WHL	62	57	56	113	91	13	6	7	13	22
1987–88	Fort Wayne Komets	IHL	55	12	27	39	239	6	1	3	4	24
1988–89	Baltimore Skipjacks	AHL	75	23	24	47	205	—	—	—	—	—
1989–90	Washington Capitals	NHL	5	1	0	1	6	—	—	—	—	—
1989–90	Baltimore Skipjacks	AHL	61	7	18	25	189	11	1	2	3	49
1990–91	Fort Wayne Komets	IHL	72	21	26	47	381	18	4	4	8	87
1991–92	Vancouver Canucks	NHL	2	0	0	0	0	1	0	0	0	0
1991–92	Milwaukee Admirals	IHL	70	27	14	41	238	5	2	2	4	8
1992–93	San Jose Sharks	NHL	42	5	0	5	47	—	—	—	—	—
1992–93	Hamilton Canucks	AHL	23	3	4	7	58	—	—	—	—	—
1992–93	Kansas City Blades	IHL	5	2	0	2	20	—	—	—	—	—
1993–94	Mighty Ducks of Anaheim	NHL	12	0	1	1	7	—	—	—	—	—
1993–94	San Diego Gulls	IHL	25	6	15	21	54	6	0	0	0	52
1994–95	Kalamazoo Wings	IHL	71	22	12	34	184	—	—	—	—	—
1994–95	Milwaukee Admirals	IHL	4	1	1	2	19	15	1	5	6	48
1995–96	San Francisco Spiders	IHL	77	23	25	48	234	4	0	2	2	4
1996–97	Fort Wayne Komets	IHL	54	10	23	33	181	—	—	—	—	—
1997–98	Fort Wayne Komets	IHL	58	12	15	27	125	—	—	—	—	—
1998–99	Fort Wayne Komets	IHL	74	11	17	28	194	—	—	—	—	—
IHL totals			565	147	175	322	1869	54	8	16	24	223
AHL totals			159	33	46	79	452	11	1	2	3	49
NHL totals			61	6	1	7	60	1	0	0	0	0

== Awards and achievements ==
- WHL West First All-Star Team (1986–87)
- BC Sports Hall of Fame (2020)

== See also ==
- List of Indian NHL players
