= 2017–18 NHL transactions =

The following is a list of all team-to-team transactions that have occurred in the National Hockey League (NHL) during the 2017–18 NHL season. It lists which team each player has been traded to, signed by, or claimed by, and for which player(s) or draft pick (s), if applicable. Players who have retired are also listed. The 2017–18 NHL trade deadline was on February 26, 2018. Players traded after this date were not eligible to play in the 2018 Stanley Cup playoffs.

== Retirement ==
Date	Player	Last Team	Ref
July 7, 2017	Kevin Klein	New York Rangers	
July 13, 2017	Andrew Ference	Edmonton Oilers	
July 17, 2017	Brian Campbell	Chicago Blackhawks	
August 3, 2017	Mike Fisher^{1}	Nashville Predators	
August 12, 2017	Pierre-Luc Letourneau-Leblond	Tampa Bay Lightning	
August 14, 2017	Matt Greene	Los Angeles Kings	
August 30, 2017	Shane Doan	Arizona Coyotes	
September 12, 2017	Ryan Carter	Minnesota Wild	
September 13, 2017	Vernon Fiddler	Nashville Predators	
September 29, 2017	John-Michael Liles	Boston Bruins	
September 29, 2017	Eric Boulton	New York Islanders	
October 4, 2017	Bryan Bickell	Carolina Hurricanes	
October 11, 2017	Marc-Andre Bergeron	Columbus Blue Jackets	
October 30, 2017	Mark Streit	Montreal Canadiens	
November 9, 2017	Vadim Shipachyov	Vegas Golden Knights	
November 23, 2017	Dennis Wideman	Calgary Flames	
December 14, 2017	Chris Neil	Ottawa Senators	
December 24, 2017	Alexander Burmistrov	Vancouver Canucks	
December 27, 2017	Mike Weber	Minnesota Wild	
January 22, 2018	Marc Savard	New Jersey Devils	
January 31, 2018	Matt Buckles	Florida Panthers	
April 7, 2018	Daniel Sedin	Vancouver Canucks	
April 7, 2018	Henrik Sedin	Vancouver Canucks	
April 7, 2018	Radim Vrbata	Florida Panthers	
April 7, 2018	Patrick Sharp	Chicago Blackhawks	
April 24, 2018	Francois Beauchemin	Anaheim Ducks	
May 12, 2018	Mike Fisher^{1}	Nashville Predators	
May 30, 2018	Nick Ellis	Edmonton Oilers	

=== Notes ===
1. On February 26, 2018, Fisher returned from his voluntary retirement, signing a one-year deal with the Nashville Predators, before retiring again at the end of the season.

== Contract terminations ==
A team and player may mutually agree to terminate a player's contract at any time. All players must clear waivers before having a contract terminated.

Buyouts can only occur at specific times of the year. For more details on contract terminations as buyouts:

Teams may buy out player contracts (after the conclusion of a season) for a portion of the remaining value of the contract, paid over a period of twice the remaining length of the contract. This reduced number and extended period is applied to the cap hit as well.

- If the player was under the age of 26 at the time of the buyout the player's pay and cap hit will reduced by a factor of 2/3 over the extended period.
- If the player was 26 or older at the time of the buyout the player's pay and cap hit will reduced by a factor of 1/3 over the extended period.
- If the player was 35 or older at the time of signing the contract the player's pay will be reduced by a factor of 1/3, but the cap hit will not be reduced over the extended period.

Injured players cannot be bought out.

Date	Name	Previous team	Notes	Ref
June 23, 2017	Matt Greene	Los Angeles Kings	Buyout	
June 27, 2017	Antti Niemi	Dallas Stars	Buyout	
June 29, 2017	Scott Hartnell	Columbus Blue Jackets	Buyout	
June 30, 2017	Benoit Pouliot	Edmonton Oilers	Buyout	
July 1, 2017	Lance Bouma	Calgary Flames	Buyout	
July 1, 2017	Ryan Murphy	Calgary Flames	Buyout	
July 1, 2017	Michael Cammalleri	New Jersey Devils	Buyout	
July 1, 2017	Devante Smith-Pelly	New Jersey Devils	Buyout	
July 1, 2017	Jussi Jokinen	Florida Panthers	Buyout	
July 1, 2017	Jimmy Hayes	Boston Bruins	Buyout	
July 1, 2017	Mark Stuart	Winnipeg Jets	Buyout	
August 14, 2017	Marek Mazanec	Nashville Predators	Mutual termination	
August 15, 2017	Alexey Marchenko	Toronto Maple Leafs	Mutual termination	
September 18, 2017	Cameron Darcy	Tampa Bay Lightning	Mutual termination	
September 18, 2017	Brian Hart	Tampa Bay Lightning	Mutual termination	
October 2, 2017	Robin Kovacs	New York Rangers	Mutual termination	
October 16, 2017	Mark Streit	Montreal Canadiens	Mutual termination	
October 21, 2017	Malte Stromwall	New York Rangers	Mutual termination	
October 29, 2017	Martin Reway	Montreal Canadiens	Mutual termination	
November 21, 2017	Anton Rodin	Vancouver Canucks	Mutual termination	
November 22, 2017	Ziyat Paigin	Edmonton Oilers	Mutual termination	
November 27, 2017	Brooks Laich	Los Angeles Kings	Mutual termination	
January 2, 2018	Emerson Etem	Arizona Coyotes	Mutual termination	
February 13, 2018	Dennis Rasmussen	Anaheim Ducks	Mutual termination	
March 3, 2018	Andrei Mironov	Colorado Avalanche	Mutual termination	
April 11, 2018	Alexei Bereglazov	New York Rangers	Mutual termination	
May 9, 2018	Yaroslav Dyblenko	New Jersey Devils	Mutual termination	
June 20, 2018	Sergei Zborovskiy	New York Rangers	Mutual termination	

== Free agency ==
Note: This does not include players who have re-signed with their previous team as an unrestricted free agent or as a restricted free agent.

Date	Player	New team	Previous team	Ref
July 1, 2017	Cal Petersen	Los Angeles Kings	Buffalo Sabres	
July 1, 2017	Brian Elliott	Philadelphia Flyers	Calgary Flames	
July 1, 2017	Anders Nilsson	Vancouver Canucks	Buffalo Sabres	
July 1, 2017	Sam Gagner	Vancouver Canucks	Columbus Blue Jackets	
July 1, 2017	Michael Del Zotto	Vancouver Canucks	Philadelphia Flyers	
July 1, 2017	Steve Mason	Winnipeg Jets	Philadelphia Flyers	
July 1, 2017	Dan Girardi	Tampa Bay Lightning	New York Rangers	
July 1, 2017	Trevor Daley	Detroit Red Wings	Pittsburgh Penguins	
July 1, 2017	Chad Johnson	Buffalo Sabres	Arizona Coyotes	
July 1, 2017	Patrick Sharp	Chicago Blackhawks	Dallas Stars	
July 1, 2017	Jonathan Bernier	Colorado Avalanche	Anaheim Ducks	
July 1, 2017	Micheal Haley	Florida Panthers	San Jose Sharks	
July 1, 2017	Martin Hanzal	Dallas Stars	Minnesota Wild	
July 1, 2017	Ryan Miller	Anaheim Ducks	Vancouver Canucks	
July 1, 2017	Ondrej Pavelec	New York Rangers	Winnipeg Jets	
July 1, 2017	Karl Alzner	Montreal Canadiens	Washington Capitals	
July 1, 2017	Kenny Agostino	Boston Bruins	St. Louis Blues	
July 1, 2017	Nick Bonino	Nashville Predators	Pittsburgh Penguins	
July 1, 2017	Ron Hainsey	Toronto Maple Leafs	Pittsburgh Penguins	
July 1, 2017	Matt Hunwick	Pittsburgh Penguins	Toronto Maple Leafs	
July 1, 2017	Harri Sateri	Florida Panthers	San Jose Sharks	
July 1, 2017	Luke Witkowski	Detroit Red Wings	Tampa Bay Lightning	
July 1, 2017	Nate Thompson	Ottawa Senators	Anaheim Ducks	
July 1, 2017	Dmitri Kulikov	Winnipeg Jets	Buffalo Sabres	
July 1, 2017	Adam Clendening	Arizona Coyotes	New York Rangers	
July 1, 2017	Brian Boyle	New Jersey Devils	Toronto Maple Leafs	
July 1, 2017	Landon Ferraro	Minnesota Wild	St. Louis Blues	
July 1, 2017	Josh Jooris	Carolina Hurricanes	Arizona Coyotes	
July 1, 2017	Justin Williams	Carolina Hurricanes	Washington Capitals	
July 1, 2017	Benoit Pouliot	Buffalo Sabres	Edmonton Oilers	
July 1, 2017	Antti Niemi	Pittsburgh Penguins	Dallas Stars	
July 1, 2017	Tyler Pitlick	Dallas Stars	Edmonton Oilers	
July 1, 2017	Chris Thorburn	St. Louis Blues	Vegas Golden Knights	
July 1, 2017	Tommy Wingels	Chicago Blackhawks	Ottawa Senators	
July 1, 2017	Michael Cammalleri	Los Angeles Kings	New Jersey Devils	
July 1, 2017	Ty Rattie	Edmonton Oilers	St. Louis Blues	
July 1, 2017	Jordan Oesterle	Chicago Blackhawks	Edmonton Oilers	
July 1, 2017	Jean-Francois Berube	Chicago Blackhawks	Vegas Golden Knights	
July 1, 2017	Ryan Murphy	Minnesota Wild	Calgary Flames	
July 1, 2017	Cal O'Reilly	Minnesota Wild	Buffalo Sabres	
July 1, 2017	Byron Froese	Montreal Canadiens	Tampa Bay Lightning	
July 1, 2017	Peter Holland	Montreal Canadiens	Arizona Coyotes	
July 1, 2017	Paul Postma	Boston Bruins	Winnipeg Jets	
July 1, 2017	Beau Bennett	St. Louis Blues	New Jersey Devils	
July 1, 2017	Lance Bouma	Chicago Blackhawks	Calgary Flames	
July 1, 2017	Tyler Randell	Ottawa Senators	Boston Bruins	
July 1, 2017	Anthony Peluso	Washington Capitals	Winnipeg Jets	
July 1, 2017	Antoine Bibeau	San Jose Sharks	Toronto Maple Leafs	
July 1, 2017	Patrick Wiercioch	Vancouver Canucks	Colorado Avalanche	
July 1, 2017	Jamie McBain	Tampa Bay Lightning	Arizona Coyotes	
July 1, 2017	Christian Folin	Los Angeles Kings	Minnesota Wild	
July 1, 2017	Matt O'Connor	Nashville Predators	Ottawa Senators	
July 1, 2017	Alex Grant	Minnesota Wild	Boston Bruins	
July 1, 2017	Turner Elson	Detroit Red Wings	Colorado Avalanche	
July 1, 2017	Michael Leighton	Tampa Bay Lightning	Carolina Hurricanes	
July 1, 2017	Brian Flynn	Dallas Stars	Montreal Canadiens	
July 1, 2017	Scott Hartnell	Nashville Predators	Columbus Blue Jackets	
July 1, 2017	Matt Taormina	Montreal Canadiens	Tampa Bay Lightning	
July 1, 2017	Seth Griffith	Buffalo Sabres	Toronto Maple Leafs	
July 1, 2017	Derek Grant	Anaheim Ducks	Buffalo Sabres	
July 1, 2017	Michael Sgarbossa	Winnipeg Jets	Florida Panthers	
July 1, 2017	Jeremy Smith	Carolina Hurricanes	Colorado Avalanche	
July 1, 2017	Brenden Kichton	Carolina Hurricanes	Winnipeg Jets	
July 1, 2017	Stepan Falkovsky	Los Angeles Kings	Calgary Flames	
July 1, 2017	Alexander Burmistrov	Vancouver Canucks	Arizona Coyotes	
July 1, 2017	Seth Helgeson	New York Islanders	New Jersey Devils	
July 1, 2017	Kevin Porter	Buffalo Sabres	Pittsburgh Penguins	
July 1, 2017	Adam Wilcox	Buffalo Sabres	Florida Panthers	
July 1, 2017	Cameron Gaunce	Columbus Blue Jackets	Pittsburgh Penguins	
July 1, 2017	Kevin Shattenkirk	New York Rangers	Washington Capitals	
July 1, 2017	Radim Vrbata	Florida Panthers	Arizona Coyotes	
July 1, 2017	Joe Morrow	Montreal Canadiens	Boston Bruins	
July 1, 2017	Kyle Rau	Minnesota Wild	Florida Panthers	
July 1, 2017	Erik Burgdoerfer	Ottawa Senators	Buffalo Sabres	
July 1, 2017	Mat Bodie	Tampa Bay Lightning	Buffalo Sabres	
July 1, 2017	Phil Varone	Philadelphia Flyers	Ottawa Senators	
July 1, 2017	Kyle Quincey	Minnesota Wild	Columbus Blue Jackets	
July 1, 2017	Mitch Callahan	Edmonton Oilers	Detroit Red Wings	
July 1, 2017	Dominic Moore	Toronto Maple Leafs	Boston Bruins	
July 1, 2017	Paul Carey	New York Rangers	Washington Capitals	
July 1, 2017	Chris Kunitz	Tampa Bay Lightning	Pittsburgh Penguins	
July 1, 2017	Buddy Robinson	Winnipeg Jets	San Jose Sharks	
July 1, 2017	Edward Pasquale	Edmonton Oilers	Detroit Red Wings	
July 1, 2017	Keegan Lowe	Edmonton Oilers	Montreal Canadiens	
July 1, 2017	Matt Tennyson	Buffalo Sabres	Carolina Hurricanes	
July 1, 2017	Mike McKenna	Dallas Stars	Tampa Bay Lightning	
July 1, 2017	Marek Hrivik	Calgary Flames	New York Rangers	
July 1, 2017	Cole Schneider	New York Rangers	Buffalo Sabres	
July 1, 2017	Pierre-Cedric Labrie	Nashville Predators	Chicago Blackhawks	
July 1, 2017	Brent Regner	Dallas Stars	Florida Panthers	
July 1, 2017	Ryan Stanton	Edmonton Oilers	Columbus Blue Jackets	
July 1, 2017	Jarred Tinordi	Pittsburgh Penguins	Arizona Coyotes	
July 1, 2017	Greg McKegg	Pittsburgh Penguins	Tampa Bay Lightning	
July 1, 2017	Zach Trotman	Pittsburgh Penguins	Los Angeles Kings	
July 1, 2017	Chris Summers	Pittsburgh Penguins	New York Rangers	
July 1, 2017	Cameron Schilling	Winnipeg Jets	Los Angeles Kings	
July 1, 2017	Vincent LoVerde	Toronto Maple Leafs	Los Angeles Kings	
July 1, 2017	Chris Mueller	Toronto Maple Leafs	Arizona Coyotes	
July 1, 2017	Connor Brickley	Florida Panthers	Vegas Golden Knights	
July 1, 2017	David Warsofsky	Colorado Avalanche	Pittsburgh Penguins	
July 1, 2017	Andrew Agozzino	Colorado Avalanche	St. Louis Blues	
July 1, 2017	Brian Strait	New Jersey Devils	Winnipeg Jets	
July 1, 2017	Bracken Kearns	New Jersey Devils	New York Islanders	
July 1, 2017	Joel Hanley	Arizona Coyotes	Montreal Canadiens	
July 1, 2017	Zac Rinaldo	Arizona Coyotes	Boston Bruins	
July 1, 2017	Mike Sislo	Arizona Coyotes	Colorado Avalanche	
July 1, 2017	Andrew Campbell	Arizona Coyotes	Toronto Maple Leafs	
July 1, 2017	Jacob Josefson	Buffalo Sabres	New Jersey Devils	
July 1, 2017	Darcy Kuemper	Los Angeles Kings	Minnesota Wild	
July 1, 2017	Brian Ferlin	Edmonton Oilers	Boston Bruins	
July 1, 2017	Grayson Downing	Edmonton Oilers	Arizona Coyotes	
July 1, 2017	Brad Hunt	Vegas Golden Knights	Nashville Predators	
July 1, 2017	Chris Casto	Vegas Golden Knights	Boston Bruins	
July 1, 2017	Maxime Lagace	Vegas Golden Knights	Dallas Stars	
July 1, 2017	Paul Thompson	Vegas Golden Knights	Florida Panthers	
July 1, 2017	Stefan Matteau	Vegas Golden Knights	Montreal Canadiens	
July 1, 2017	T.J. Tynan	Vegas Golden Knights	Columbus Blue Jackets	
July 1, 2017	Mike Liambas	Anaheim Ducks	Nashville Predators	
July 2, 2017	Luke Gazdic	Calgary Flames	New Jersey Devils	
July 2, 2017	Patrick Marleau	Toronto Maple Leafs	San Jose Sharks	
July 2, 2017	Steven Oleksy	Anaheim Ducks	Toronto Maple Leafs	
July 2, 2017	Alexandre Grenier	Florida Panthers	Vancouver Canucks	
July 3, 2017	Devante Smith-Pelly	Washington Capitals	New Jersey Devils	
July 3, 2017	Ales Hemsky	Montreal Canadiens	Dallas Stars	
July 3, 2017	Oscar Dansk	Vegas Golden Knights	Columbus Blue Jackets	
July 3, 2017	Alexander Radulov	Dallas Stars	Montreal Canadiens	
July 3, 2017	Brad Malone	Edmonton Oilers	St. Louis Blues	
July 4, 2017	Nail Yakupov	Colorado Avalanche	St. Louis Blues	
July 4, 2017	Brandon Bollig	San Jose Sharks	Calgary Flames	
July 4, 2017	David Desharnais	New York Rangers	Edmonton Oilers	
July 4, 2017	Michael Latta	Arizona Coyotes	Chicago Blackhawks	
July 5, 2017	Reto Berra	Anaheim Ducks	Florida Panthers	
July 5, 2017	Emerson Etem	Arizona Coyotes	Anaheim Ducks	
July 7, 2017	Jussi Jokinen	Edmonton Oilers	Florida Panthers	
July 7, 2017	Dennis Rasmussen	Anaheim Ducks	Chicago Blackhawks	
July 10, 2017	Yohann Auvitu	Edmonton Oilers	New Jersey Devils	
July 24, 2017	Johnny Oduya	Ottawa Senators	Chicago Blackhawks	
July 25, 2017	Mark Streit	Montreal Canadiens	Pittsburgh Penguins	
July 25, 2017	Jesse Graham	Colorado Avalanche	New York Islanders	
August 2, 2017	Nate Prosser	St. Louis Blues	Minnesota Wild	
August 16, 2017	Matt Cullen	Minnesota Wild	Pittsburgh Penguins	
August 16, 2017	Dominic Toninato	Colorado Avalanche	Toronto Maple Leafs	
August 21, 2017	Francois Beauchemin	Anaheim Ducks	Colorado Avalanche	
August 21, 2017	Doyle Somerby	Columbus Blue Jackets	New York Islanders	
August 24, 2017	Alexander Kerfoot	Colorado Avalanche	New Jersey Devils	
August 25, 2017	Drew Stafford	New Jersey Devils	Boston Bruins	
August 26, 2017	Matt Hendricks	Winnipeg Jets	Edmonton Oilers	
August 27, 2017	Will Butcher	New Jersey Devils	Colorado Avalanche	
September 1, 2017	Thomas Vanek	Vancouver Canucks	Florida Panthers	
September 11, 2017	Brandon Mashinter	San Jose Sharks	Chicago Blackhawks	
October 1, 2017	Jimmy Hayes	New Jersey Devils	Boston Bruins	
October 3, 2017	Tanner Glass	Calgary Flames	New York Rangers	
October 4, 2017	Cody Franson	Chicago Blackhawks	Buffalo Sabres	
October 4, 2017	Brandon Pirri	Vegas Golden Knights	New York Rangers	
October 4, 2017	Alex Chiasson	Washington Capitals	Calgary Flames	
October 4, 2017	Daniel Winnik	Minnesota Wild	Washington Capitals	
October 4, 2017	Jaromir Jagr	Calgary Flames	Florida Panthers	
October 19, 2017	Brooks Laich	Los Angeles Kings	Toronto Maple Leafs	
November 16, 2017	Glenn Gawdin	Calgary Flames	St. Louis Blues	
December 5, 2017	Marek Mazanec	New York Rangers	Nashville Predators	
February 25, 2018	Cody Goloubef	Calgary Flames	Colorado Avalanche	
February 25, 2018	Jim O'Brien	Ottawa Senators	Colorado Avalanche	
February 25, 2018	Brian Gionta	Boston Bruins	Buffalo Sabres	
February 25, 2018	Chris Kelly	Anaheim Ducks	Ottawa Senators	

=== Imports ===
This section is for players who were not previously on contract with NHL teams in the past season. Listed is their previous team and the league that they belonged to.

Date	Player	New team	Previous team	League	Ref
July 1, 2017	Spencer Foo	Calgary Flames	Union Dutchmen	NCAA	
July 1, 2017	Evgenii Dadonov	Florida Panthers	SKA Saint Petersburg	KHL	
July 1, 2017	Niklas Svedberg	Minnesota Wild	Salavat Yulaev Ufa	KHL	
July 1, 2017	Anders Lindback	Nashville Predators	Rogle BK	SHL	
July 1, 2017	Jordan Szwarz	Boston Bruins	Providence Bruins	AHL	
July 1, 2017	Kyle Criscuolo	Buffalo Sabres	Grand Rapids Griffins	AHL	
July 1, 2017	Kane Lafranchise	New York Islanders	Bridgeport Sound Tigers	AHL	
July 1, 2017	Max Reinhart	Ottawa Senators	Kölner Haie	DEL	
July 1, 2017	Ben Sexton	Ottawa Senators	Albany Devils	AHL	
July 1, 2017	Danny Taylor	Ottawa Senators	HC Sibir Novosibirsk	KHL	
July 1, 2017	Corban Knight	Philadelphia Flyers	Lehigh Valley Phantoms	AHL	
July 1, 2017	Andre Benoit	Columbus Blue Jackets	Malmö Redhawks	SHL	
July 1, 2017	Alex Gallant	Tampa Bay Lightning	San Jose Barracuda	AHL	
July 1, 2017	Brian Gibbons	New Jersey Devils	Albany Devils	AHL	
July 1, 2017	Curtis Valk	Florida Panthers	Utica Comets	AHL	
July 1, 2017	Casey DeSmith	Pittsburgh Penguins	Wilkes-Barre/Scranton Penguins	AHL	
July 2, 2017	Scott Sabourin	Anaheim Ducks	San Diego Gulls	AHL	
July 3, 2017	John Albert	Washington Capitals	Oulun Kärpät	Liiga	
July 3, 2017	Kevin Czuczman	Pittsburgh Penguins	Manitoba Moose	AHL	
July 6, 2017	Adam Johnson	Pittsburgh Penguins	Minnesota–Duluth Bulldogs	NCAA	
July 11, 2017	Wayne Simpson	Washington Capitals	Providence Bruins	AHL	
July 13, 2017	Josef Korenar	San Jose Sharks	Lincoln Stars	USHL	
July 17, 2017	Alexandar Georgiev	New York Rangers	HC TPS	Liiga	
July 28, 2017	Collin Delia	Chicago Blackhawks	Merrimack Warriors	NCAA	
September 7, 2017	Jacob Middleton	San Jose Sharks	San Jose Barracuda	AHL	
September 13, 2017	Alex D'Orio	Pittsburgh Penguins	Saint John Sea Dogs	QMJHL	
September 16, 2017	Jordy Bellerive	Pittsburgh Penguins	Lethbridge Hurricanes	WHL	
September 18, 2017	Dereck Baribeau	Minnesota Wild	Quebec Remparts	QMJHL	
September 19, 2017	Parker Kelly	Ottawa Senators	Prince Albert Raiders	WHL	
September 20, 2017	Dylan Coghlan	Vegas Golden Knights	Tri-City Americans	WHL	
September 22, 2017	Ed Wittchow	Florida Panthers	Springfield Thunderbirds	AHL	
September 25, 2017	Sam Miletic	Pittsburgh Penguins	London Knights	OHL	
September 26, 2017	Brennan Menell	Minnesota Wild	Lethbridge Hurricanes	WHL	
October 2, 2017	David Booth	Detroit Red Wings	Avangard Omsk	KHL	
October 2, 2017	Ty Lewis	Colorado Avalanche	Brandon Wheat Kings	WHL	
October 3, 2017	Kaden Fulcher	Detroit Red Wings	Hamilton Bulldogs	OHL	
October 3, 2017	Kyle Keyser	Boston Bruins	Oshawa Generals	OHL	
October 24, 2017	Jack Rodewald	Ottawa Senators	Belleville Senators	AHL	
November 3, 2017	Maxime Fortier	Columbus Blue Jackets	Halifax Mooseheads	QMJHL	
November 20, 2017	Anthony Greco	Florida Panthers	Springfield Thunderbirds	AHL	
November 27, 2017	Austin Strand	Los Angeles Kings	Seattle Thunderbirds	WHL	
December 8, 2017	Cole Kehler	Los Angeles Kings	Portland Winterhawks	WHL	
December 26, 2017	Aaron Luchuk	Ottawa Senators	Barrie Colts	OHL	
December 28, 2017	Cameron Hebig	Edmonton Oilers	Saskatoon Blades	WHL	
December 28, 2017	Jayden Halbgewachs	San Jose Sharks	Moose Jaw Warriors	WHL	
January 24, 2018	Nathan Gerbe	Columbus Blue Jackets	Geneve-Servette HC	NL	
February 7, 2018	Darren Archibald	Vancouver Canucks	Utica Comets	AHL	
February 25, 2018	Chris Breen	Boston Bruins	Providence Bruins	AHL	
February 25, 2018	John Muse	Philadelphia Flyers	Lehigh Valley Phantoms	AHL	
March 1, 2018	Alex Barre-Boulet	Tampa Bay Lightning	Blainville-Boisbriand Armada	QMJHL	
March 1, 2018	Brayden Burke	Arizona Coyotes	Moose Jaw Warriors	WHL	
March 2, 2018	Vincent Praplan	San Jose Sharks	EHC Kloten	NL	
March 5, 2018	Colin Larkin	Edmonton Oilers	UMass Boston Beacons	NCAA III	
March 6, 2018	Tyler Sikura	Chicago Blackhawks	Rockford IceHogs	AHL	
March 8, 2018	Zach Whitecloud	Vegas Golden Knights	Bemidji State Beavers	NCAA	
March 9, 2018	Patrick Bajkov	Florida Panthers	Everett Silvertips	WHL	
March 15, 2018	Scott Eansor	New York Islanders	Bridgeport Sound Tigers	AHL	
March 17, 2018	Mason Marchment	Toronto Maple Leafs	Toronto Marlies	AHL	
March 20, 2018	Kiefer Sherwood	Anaheim Ducks	Miami RedHawks	NCAA	
March 24, 2018	Cam Johnson	New Jersey Devils	North Dakota Fighting Hawks	NCAA	
March 24, 2018	Hayden Verbeek	Montreal Canadiens	Sault Ste. Marie Greyhounds	OHL	
March 25, 2018	Mitch Reinke	St. Louis Blues	Michigan Tech Huskies	NCAA	
March 26, 2018	Eric Robinson	Columbus Blue Jackets	Princeton Tigers	NCAA	
March 28, 2018	Andrew Sturtz	Ottawa Senators	Penn State Nittany Lions	NCAA	
March 29, 2018	Daniel Brickley	Los Angeles Kings	Minnesota State Mavericks	NCAA	
March 30, 2018	Sheldon Rempal	Los Angeles Kings	Clarkson Golden Knights	NCAA	
April 2, 2018	Tanner Jeannot	Nashville Predators	Moose Jaw Warriors	WHL	
April 3, 2018	Niclas Westerholm	Nashville Predators	SaiPa	Liiga	
April 3, 2018	Lukas Radil	San Jose Sharks	HC Spartak Moscow	KHL	
April 5, 2018	Josh Dickinson	Colorado Avalanche	Clarkson Golden Knights	NCAA	
April 6, 2018	Yannick Rathgeb	New York Islanders	HC Fribourg-Gotteron	NL	
April 8, 2018	Tony Calderone	Dallas Stars	Michigan Wolverines	NCAA	
April 10, 2018	Karson Kuhlman	Boston Bruins	Minnesota–Duluth Bulldogs	NCAA	
April 11, 2018	Andrew Oglevie	Buffalo Sabres	Notre Dame Fighting Irish	NCAA	
April 12, 2018	Jordan Gross	Arizona Coyotes	Notre Dame Fighting Irish	NCAA	
April 24, 2018	Alexandre Alain	Montreal Canadiens	Blainville-Boisbriand Armada	QMJHL	
April 26, 2018	Miroslav Svoboda	Nashville Predators	HC Plzeň	ELH	
April 28, 2018	Dominik Kahun	Chicago Blackhawks	EHC Red Bull München	DEL	
May 1, 2018	Brad Morrison	Los Angeles Kings	Lethbridge Hurricanes	WHL	
May 2, 2018	Michael Lindqvist	New York Rangers	Färjestad BK	SHL	
May 2, 2018	Eric Martinsson	Minnesota Wild	Växjö Lakers	SHL	
May 2, 2018	Pavel Francouz	Colorado Avalanche	Traktor Chelyabinsk	KHL	
May 2, 2018	Juuso Ikonen	Washington Capitals	Brynäs IF	SHL	
May 3, 2018	Ville Meskanen	New York Rangers	Ilves	Liiga	
May 3, 2018	Connor Clifton	Boston Bruins	Providence Bruins	AHL	
May 7, 2018	Filip Pyrochta	Nashville Predators	HC Bílí Tygři Liberec	ELH	
May 8, 2018	Travis St. Denis	New York Islanders	Bridgeport Sound Tigers	AHL	
May 9, 2018	Maximilian Kammerer	Washington Capitals	Düsseldorfer EG	DEL	
May 9, 2018	Mathias Bau	Washington Capitals	Hershey Bears	AHL	
May 9, 2018	Carl Persson	Nashville Predators	Karlskrona HK	SHL	
May 15, 2018	David Ullstrom	Arizona Coyotes	HV71	SHL	
May 15, 2018	Lawrence Pilut	Buffalo Sabres	HV71	SHL	
May 17, 2018	Par Lindholm	Toronto Maple Leafs	Skellefteå AIK	SHL	
May 17, 2018	Igor Ozhiganov	Toronto Maple Leafs	HC CSKA Moscow	KHL	
May 18, 2018	Saku Maenalanen	Carolina Hurricanes	Oulun Kärpät	Liiga	
May 18, 2018	Joel Persson	Edmonton Oilers	Växjö Lakers	SHL	
May 18, 2018	Juuso Riikola	Pittsburgh Penguins	KalPa	Liiga	
May 21, 2018	Egor Yakovlev	New Jersey Devils	SKA Saint Petersburg	KHL	
May 21, 2018	Darren Raddysh	Chicago Blackhawks	Rockford IceHogs	AHL	
May 21, 2018	Kevin Lankinen	Chicago Blackhawks	HIFK	Liiga	
May 21, 2018	Patrik Rybar	Detroit Red Wings	Mountfield HK	ELH	
May 23, 2018	Ilya Lyubushkin	Arizona Coyotes	Lokomotiv Yaroslavl	KHL	
May 28, 2018	David Sklenicka	Montreal Canadiens	HC Plzeň	ELH	
May 28, 2018	Michal Moravcik	Montreal Canadiens	HC Plzeň	ELH	
May 31, 2018	Jacob Nilsson	Chicago Blackhawks	Mora IK	SHL	
June 1, 2018	Bogdan Kiselevich	Florida Panthers	HC CSKA Moscow	KHL	
June 1, 2018	Gage Quinney	Vegas Golden Knights	Wilkes-Barre/Scranton Penguins	AHL	
June 1, 2018	Kevin Lynch	Tampa Bay Lightning	Syracuse Crunch	AHL	

== Trades ==
* Retained Salary Transaction: Each team is allowed up to three contracts on their payroll where they have retained salary in a trade (i.e. the player no longer plays with Team A due to a trade to Team B, but Team A still retains some salary). Only up to 50% of a player's contract can be kept, and only up to 15% of a team's salary cap can be taken up by retained salary. A contract can only be involved in one of these trades twice.

Hover over retained salary or conditional transactions for more information.

=== June ===
June 23, 2017	To Arizona Coyotes Niklas Hjalmarsson	To Chicago Blackhawks Connor Murphy; Laurent Dauphin
June 23, 2017	To Columbus Blue Jackets Artemi Panarin; Tyler Motte; NYI 6th-round pick in 2017	To Chicago Blackhawks Brandon Saad; Anton Forsberg; 5th-round pick in 2018
June 23, 2017	To Columbus Blue Jackets Jordan Schroeder	To Minnesota Wild Dante Salituro
June 23, 2017	To Arizona Coyotes Derek Stepan; Antti Raanta	To New York Rangers Tony DeAngelo; 1st-round pick in 2017
June 23, 2017	To St. Louis Blues Brayden Schenn	To Philadelphia Flyers Jori Lehtera; WSH 1st-round pick in 2017 conditional 1st-round pick in 2018 or 1st-round pick in 2019 conditional 3rd-round pick in 2020
June 23, 2017	To Pittsburgh Penguins Ryan Reaves; 2nd-round pick in 2017	To St. Louis Blues Oskar Sundqvist; 1st-round pick in 2017
June 24, 2017	To Vegas Golden Knights Keegan Kolesar	To Columbus Blue Jackets TBL 2nd-round pick in 2017
June 24, 2017	To Calgary Flames Travis Hamonic conditional 4th-round pick in 2019 or 4th-round pick in 2020	To New York Islanders 1st-round pick in 2018; 2nd-round pick in 2018 conditional 2nd-round pick in 2019 or 2nd-round pick in 2020
June 26, 2017	To Dallas Stars Marc Methot	To Vegas Golden Knights Dylan Ferguson; 2nd-round pick in 2020
June 29, 2017	To Calgary Flames Eddie Lack*; Ryan Murphy; 7th-round pick in 2019	To Carolina Hurricanes Keegan Kanzig; 6th-round pick in 2019
June 30, 2017	To Buffalo Sabres Marco Scandella; Jason Pominville; 4th-round pick in 2018	To Minnesota Wild Tyler Ennis; Marcus Foligno; 3rd-round pick in 2018

Pick-only 2017 NHL entry draft trades
June 23, 2017	To Dallas Stars 1st-round pick in 2017 (#26 overall)	To Chicago Blackhawks ANA 1st-round pick in 2017 (#29 overall); 3rd-round pick in 2017 (#70 overall)
June 24, 2017	To Philadelphia Flyers 2nd-round pick in 2017 (#35 overall)	To Arizona Coyotes 2nd-round pick in 2017 (#44 overall); 3rd-round pick in 2017 (#75 overall); NYI 4th-round pick in 2017 (#108 overall)
June 24, 2017	To Edmonton Oilers CGY 3rd-round pick in 2017 (#78 overall)	To Arizona Coyotes STL 3rd-round pick in 2017 (#82 overall); VAN 5th-round pick in 2017 (#126 overall)
June 24, 2017	To San Jose Sharks FLA 4th-round pick in 2017 (#102 overall)	To New York Rangers NSH 4th-round pick in 2017 (#123 overall); 6th-round pick in 2017 (#174 overall)
June 24, 2017	To Chicago Blackhawks SJS 4th-round pick in 2017 (#112 overall)	To Vancouver Canucks CAR 5th-round pick in 2017 (#135 overall); 6th-round pick in 2017 (#181 overall)
June 24, 2017	To New York Islanders 6th-round pick in 2017 (#165 overall)	To Los Angeles Kings 6th-round pick in 2018
June 24, 2017	To Montreal Canadiens 7th-round pick in 2017 (#199 overall)	To Philadelphia Flyers 7th-round pick in 2018
June 24, 2017	To San Jose Sharks NSH 6th-round pick in 2017 (#185 overall)	To New Jersey Devils 7th-round pick in 2017 (#205 overall); OTT 7th-round pick in 2017 (#214 overall)

=== July ===
July 1, 2017	To Colorado Avalanche Colin Wilson	To Nashville Predators 4th-round pick in 2019
July 1, 2017	To New York Islanders Kristers Gudlevskis	To Tampa Bay Lightning Carter Verhaeghe
July 1, 2017	To Detroit Red Wings Tom McCollum	To Calgary Flames conditional 7th-round pick in 2018
July 1, 2017	To Nashville Predators Alexei Emelin*	To Vegas Golden Knights 3rd-round pick in 2019
July 2, 2017	To Vegas Golden Knights Marcus Kruger	To Chicago Blackhawks future considerations
July 2, 2017	To New Jersey Devils Marcus Johansson	To Washington Capitals FLA 2nd-round pick in 2018; TOR 3rd-round pick in 2018
July 4, 2017	To Carolina Hurricanes Marcos Kruger	To Vegas Golden Knights 5th-round pick in 2018

=== September ===
September 17, 2017	To Arizona Coyotes Jason Demers*	To Florida Panthers Jamie McGinn

=== October ===
October 3, 2017	To Vancouver Canucks Derrick Pouliot	To Pittsburgh Penguins Andrey Pedan; 4th-round pick in 2018
October 4, 2017	To Montreal Canadiens Nicolas Deslauriers	To Buffalo Sabres Zach Redmond
October 4, 2017	To Chicago Blackhawks Andreas Martinsen	To Montreal Canadiens Kyle Baun
October 6, 2017	To Toronto Maple Leafs Calvin Pickard	To Vegas Golden Knights Tobias Lindberg; 6th-round pick in 2018
October 9, 2017	To Philadelphia Flyers Dustin Tokarski	To Anaheim Ducks future considerations
October 21, 2017	To Detroit Red Wings Matt Puempel	To New York Rangers Ryan Sproul
October 21, 2017	To Pittsburgh Penguins Riley Sheahan; 5th-round pick in 2018	To Detroit Red Wings Scott Wilson; 3rd-round pick in 2018
October 28, 2017	To Arizona Coyotes Scott Wedgewood	To New Jersey Devils CGY 5th-round pick in 2018

=== November ===
November 5, 2017	To Ottawa Senators Matt Duchene	To Colorado Avalanche Kyle Turris; Shane Bowers; Andrew Hammond conditional 1st-round pick in 2018 or 1st-round pick in 2019; 3rd-round pick in 2019
November 5, 2017	To Nashville Predators Kyle Turris	To Colorado Avalanche Samuel Girard; Vladislav Kamenev; 2nd-round pick in 2018
November 10, 2017	To Dallas Stars Reece Scarlett	To Florida Panthers Ludwig Bystrom
November 14, 2017	To Arizona Coyotes Michael Leighton; Tye McGinn	To Tampa Bay Lightning Louis Domingue
November 14, 2017	To Edmonton Oilers Michael Cammalleri	To Los Angeles Kings Jussi Jokinen
November 23, 2017	To Los Angeles Kings Torrey Mitchell	To Montreal Canadiens conditional 5th-round pick in 2018
November 30, 2017	To New Jersey Devils Sami Vatanen conditional 3rd-round pick in 2019 or 3rd-round pick in 2020	To Anaheim Ducks Adam Henrique; Joseph Blandisi; 3rd-round pick in 2018
November 30, 2017	To New York Rangers Peter Holland	To Montreal Canadiens Adam Cracknell

=== December ===
December 4, 2017	To Buffalo Sabres Scott Wilson	To Detroit Red Wings 5th-round pick in 2019
December 8, 2017	To Vancouver Canucks Nic Dowd	To Los Angeles Kings Jordan Subban
December 14, 2017	To New Jersey Devils Michael Latta	To Arizona Coyotes Ryan Kujawinski
December 19, 2017	To Pittsburgh Penguins Michael Leighton; MIN 4th-round pick in 2019	To Arizona Coyotes Josh Archibald; Sean Maguire; 6th-round pick in 2019
December 19, 2017	To Florida Panthers Greg Chase	To Edmonton Oilers future considerations
December 19, 2017	To Pittsburgh Penguins Jamie Oleksiak	To Dallas Stars conditional MIN 4th-round pick in 2019 or PIT 4th-round pick in 2019
December 30, 2017	To New Jersey Devils Eddie Lack	To Calgary Flames Dalton Prout

=== January ===
January 4, 2018	To Edmonton Oilers Al Montoya	To Montreal Canadiens conditional 4th-round pick in 2018 or 5th-round pick in 2018
January 10, 2018	To Chicago Blackhawks Anthony Duclair; Adam Clendening	To Arizona Coyotes Richard Panik; Laurent Dauphin
January 22, 2018	To Arizona Coyotes John Ramage	To Columbus Blue Jackets future considerations
January 22, 2018	To Columbus Blue Jackets Jeff Zatkoff	To Los Angeles Kings future considerations
January 31, 2018	To Tampa Bay Lightning Edward Pasquale	To Edmonton Oilers future considerations

=== February ===
February 3, 2018	To Nashville Predators Mark McNeill	To Dallas Stars Andrew O'Brien
February 5, 2018	To Vegas Golden Knights Zachary Leslie	To Los Angeles Kings future considerations
February 8, 2018	To New Jersey Devils Christoph Bertschy; Mario Lucia	To Minnesota Wild Viktor Loov
February 9, 2018	To New York Rangers John Albert	To Washington Capitals Adam Chapie
February 13, 2018	To Los Angeles Kings Dion Phaneuf*; Nate Thompson	To Ottawa Senators Marian Gaborik; Nick Shore
February 15, 2018	To Ottawa Senators Ville Pokka	To Chicago Blackhawks Chris DiDomenico
February 15, 2018	To St. Louis Blues Nikita Soshnikov	To Toronto Maple Leafs 4th-round pick in 2019
February 19, 2018	To Washington Capitals Michal Kempny	To Chicago Blackhawks conditional TOR 3rd-round pick in 2018 or WSH 3rd-round pick in 2018
February 19, 2018	To Philadelphia Flyers Petr Mrazek*	To Detroit Red Wings conditional 2nd-round pick in 2018 or 3rd-round pick in 2018 or 4th-round pick in 2018 conditional 3rd-round pick in 2019
February 20, 2018	To Boston Bruins Nick Holden	To New York Rangers Rob O'Gara; 3rd-round pick in 2018
February 20, 2018	To San Jose Sharks Eric Fehr	To Toronto Maple Leafs 7th-round pick in 2020
February 21, 2018	To Washington Capitals Jukub Jerabek	To Montreal Canadiens 5th-round pick in 2019
February 21, 2018	To Los Angeles Kings Tobias Rieder*; Scott Wedgewood	To Arizona Coyotes Darcy Kuemper
February 22, 2018	To Florida Panthers Frank Vatrano	To Boston Bruins 3rd-round pick in 2018
February 22, 2018	To New Jersey Devils Michael Grabner	To New York Rangers Yegor Rykov; 2nd-round pick in 2018
February 23, 2018	To Pittsburgh Penguins Tobias Lindberg	To Vegas Golden Knights 3rd-round pick in 2019
February 23, 2018	To Vegas Golden Knights Derick Brassard	To Ottawa Senators PIT 3rd-round pick in 2019
February 23, 2018	To Pittsburgh Penguins Derick Brassard*	To Vegas Golden Knights Ryan Reaves; VAN 4th-round pick in 2018
February 23, 2018	To Ottawa Senators Ian Cole; Filip Gustavsson; 1st-round pick in 2018	To Pittsburgh Penguins Vincent Dunn; 3rd-round pick in 2018
February 24, 2018	To New York Islanders Brandon Davidson	To Edmonton Oilers 3rd-round pick in 2019
February 25, 2018	To Boston Bruins Rick Nash*	To New York Rangers Ryan Spooner; Ryan Lindgren; Matt Beleskey*; 1st-round pick in 2018; 7th-round pick in 2019
February 25, 2018	To Toronto Maple Leafs Tomas Plekanec*; Kyle Baun	To Montreal Canadiens Kerby Rychel; Rinat Valiev; 2nd-round pick in 2018
February 25, 2018	To Nashville Predators Mark Letestu	To Edmonton Oilers Pontus Aberg
February 25, 2018	To Columbus Blue Jackets Mark Letestu	To Nashville Predators 4th-round pick in 2018
February 25, 2018	To Nashville Predators Brandon Bollig; Troy Grosenick	To San Jose Sharks 6th-round pick in 2018
February 26, 2018	To Columbus Blue Jackets Ian Cole	To Ottawa Senators Nick Moutrey; 3rd-round pick in 2020
February 26, 2018	To Nashville Predators Ryan Hartman; 5th-round pick in 2018	To Chicago Blackhawks Victor Ejdsell; 1st-round pick in 2018; 4th-round pick in 2018
February 26, 2018	To Winnipeg Jets Paul Stastny*	To St. Louis Blues Erik Foley conditional 1st-round pick in 2018 or 1st-round pick in 2019 conditional 4th-round pick in 2020
February 26, 2018	To Vancouver Canucks Brendan Leipsic	To Vegas Golden Knights Philip Holm
February 26, 2018	To Columbus Blue Jackets Ryan Kujawinski	To Arizona Coyotes Jordan Maletta
February 26, 2018	To Anaheim Ducks Jason Chimera	To New York Islanders Chris Wagner
February 26, 2018	To San Jose Sharks Evander Kane	To Buffalo Sabres Danny O'Regan conditional 1st-round pick in 2019 or 2nd-round pick in 2019 or 1st-round pick in 2020 conditional 4th-round pick in 2019 or 3rd-round pick in 2020
February 26, 2018	To Columbus Blue Jackets Thomas Vanek	To Vancouver Canucks Jussi Jokinen; Tyler Motte
February 26, 2018	To Vegas Golden Knights Tomas Tatar	To Detroit Red Wings 1st-round pick in 2018; NYI 2nd-round pick in 2019; 3rd-round pick in 2021
February 26, 2018	To Winnipeg Jets Joe Morrow	To Montreal Canadiens 4th-round pick in 2018
February 26, 2018	To Montreal Canadiens Mike Reilly	To Minnesota Wild 5th-round pick in 2019
February 26, 2018	To Calgary Flames Nick Shore	To Ottawa Senators 7th-round pick in 2019
February 26, 2018	To Tampa Bay Lightning Ryan McDonagh; J. T. Miller	To New York Rangers Vladislav Namestnikov; Brett Howden; Libor Hajek; 1st-round pick in 2018 conditional 1st-round pick in 2019 or 2nd-round pick in 2019
February 26, 2018	To Pittsburgh Penguins Josh Jooris	To Carolina Hurricanes Greg McKegg
February 26, 2018	To Boston Bruins Tommy Wingels	To Chicago Blackhawks conditional 4th-round pick in 2019 or 5th-round pick in 2019
February 26, 2018	To New Jersey Devils Patrick Maroon	To Edmonton Oilers J. D. Dudek; 3rd-round pick in 2019
February 26, 2018	To New York Rangers Chris Bigras	To Colorado Avalanche Ryan Graves
February 26, 2018	To Arizona Coyotes Pierre-Cedric Labrie; Trevor Murphy	To Nashville Predators Tyler Gaudet; John Ramage

=== March ===
March 21, 2018	To Edmonton Oilers Cooper Marody	To Philadelphia Flyers NJD 3rd-round pick in 2019

=== May ===
May 3, 2018	To Arizona Coyotes Marcus Kruger*; 3rd-round pick in 2018	To Carolina Hurricanes Jordan Martinook; 4th-round pick in 2018

=== June (2018) ===
June 8, 2018	To Edmonton Oilers Nolan Vesey	To Toronto Maple Leafs conditional 7th-round pick in 2020
June 13, 2018	To Los Angeles Kings Peter Budaj	To Tampa Bay Lightning Andy Andreoff
June 14, 2018	To Arizona Coyotes Hudson Fasching	To Buffalo Sabres Brandon Hickey; Mike Sislo
June 14, 2018	To Arizona Coyotes Adam Helewka	To San Jose Sharks Kyle Wood
June 15, 2018	To Arizona Coyotes Alex Galchenyuk	To Montreal Canadiens Max Domi
June 19, 2018	To San Jose Sharks Mike Hoffman; Cody Donaghey; 5th-round pick in 2020	To Ottawa Senators Mikkel Boedker; Julius Bergman; 6th-round pick in 2020
June 19, 2018	To Florida Panthers Mike Hoffman; 7th-round pick in 2018	To San Jose Sharks VGK 4th-round pick in 2018; 5th-round pick in 2018; 2nd-round pick in 2019

== Waivers ==
Once an NHL player has played in a certain number of games or a set number of seasons has passed since the signing of his first NHL contract (see here), that player must be offered to all of the other NHL teams before he can be assigned to a minor league affiliate.

Date	Player	New team	Previous team	Ref
September 27, 2017	Jordan Nolan	Buffalo Sabres	Los Angeles Kings	
October 3, 2017	Patrik Nemeth	Colorado Avalanche	Dallas Stars	
October 3, 2017	Malcolm Subban	Vegas Golden Knights	Boston Bruins	
October 9, 2017	Adam Cracknell	New York Rangers	Dallas Stars	
October 24, 2017	Antti Niemi	Florida Panthers	Pittsburgh Penguins	
November 14, 2017	Antti Niemi	Montreal Canadiens	Florida Panthers	
November 22, 2017	Gabriel Dumont	Ottawa Senators	Tampa Bay Lightning	
November 24, 2017	Chris DiDomenico	Tampa Bay Lightning	Ottawa Senators	
November 30, 2017	Nate Prosser	Minnesota Wild	St. Louis Blues	
December 1, 2017	Nathan Walker	Edmonton Oilers	Washington Capitals	
December 2, 2017	Chris DiDomenico	Ottawa Senators	Tampa Bay Lightning	
December 3, 2017	Brandon Davidson	Edmonton Oilers	Montreal Canadiens	
December 13, 2017	Ryan Carpenter	Vegas Golden Knights	San Jose Sharks	
December 20, 2017	Nathan Walker	Washington Capitals	Edmonton Oilers	
January 4, 2018	Freddie Hamilton	Arizona Coyotes	Calgary Flames	
January 14, 2018	J.T. Brown	Anaheim Ducks	Tampa Bay Lightning	
January 15, 2018	Logan Shaw	Montreal Canadiens	Anaheim Ducks	
January 17, 2018	Jussi Jokinen	Columbus Blue Jackets	Los Angeles Kings	
January 25, 2018	Cody McLeod	New York Rangers	Nashville Predators	
January 26, 2018	Magnus Paajarvi	Ottawa Senators	St. Louis Blues	
February 21, 2018	Taylor Chorney	Columbus Blue Jackets	Washington Capitals	
February 21, 2018	Gabriel Dumont	Tampa Bay Lightning	Ottawa Senators	
February 26, 2018	Mark Alt	Colorado Avalanche	Philadelphia Flyers	
February 26, 2018	Johnny Oduya	Philadelphia Flyers	Ottawa Senators	
February 26, 2018	Chris Stewart	Calgary Flames	Minnesota Wild	

== See also ==
- 2017 NHL entry draft
- 2018 NHL entry draft
- 2017 in sports
- 2018 in sports
- 2016–17 NHL transactions
- 2018–19 NHL transactions
- 2017 NHL expansion draft
