= Subban =

Subban is a surname. Notable people with the surname include:

- Jordan Subban (born 1995), Canadian ice hockey player
- Malcolm Subban (born 1993), Canadian ice hockey player
- P. K. Subban (born 1989), Canadian ice hockey player, brother of Jordan and Malcolm
