= P. K. Subban =

Canadian ice hockey player (born 1989)

P. K. Subban MSC
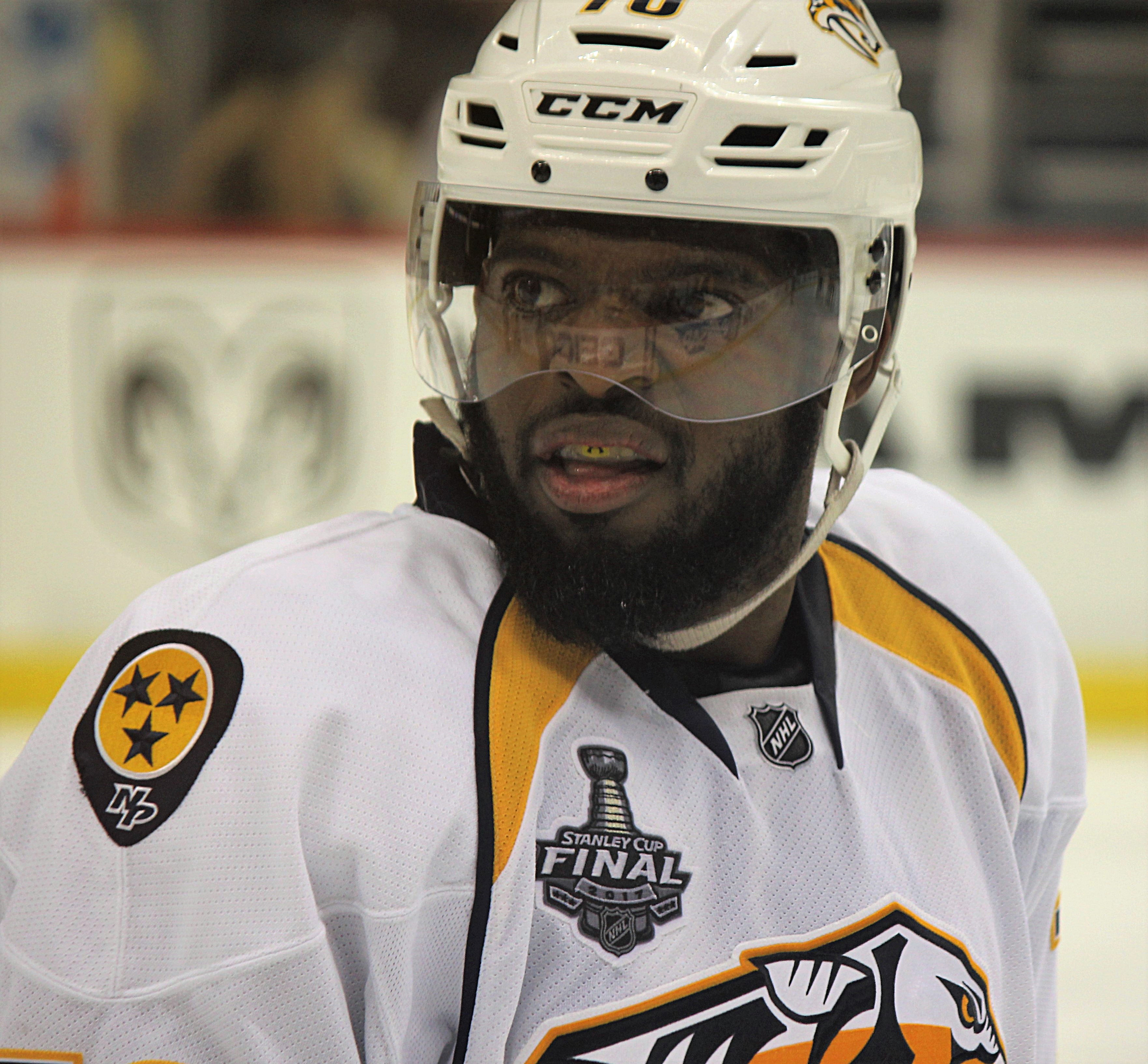
- Subban with the Nashville Predators during the 2017 Stanley Cup Final
- Born: May 13, 1989 (age 37) Toronto, Ontario, Canada
- Height: 6 ft 0 in (183 cm)
- Weight: 210 lb (95 kg; 15 st 0 lb)
- Position: Defence
- Shot: Right
- Played for: Montreal Canadiens; Nashville Predators; New Jersey Devils
- National team: Canada
- NHL draft: 43rd overall, 2007; Montreal Canadiens
- Playing career: 2009–2022

Pernell-Karl Sylvester Subban MSC (/ˈsubæn/ SOO-ban; born May 13, 1989) is a Canadian former professional ice hockey defenceman. Between 2009 and 2022, he played 13 seasons in the National Hockey League (NHL) with the Montreal Canadiens, Nashville Predators, and New Jersey Devils. The Canadiens selected Subban in the second round, 43rd overall, of the 2007 NHL entry draft. In 2013, he won the Norris Trophy as the NHL's top defenceman, and tied with Kris Letang as the season's leading scorer among defencemen. In the summer of 2014, he signed an eight-year, $72 million contract with the Canadiens, running through the 2021–22 season. After the 2015–16 season, Subban was traded to the Nashville Predators, where he spent three seasons before being traded to New Jersey in 2019. He is now a broadcast analyst for the NHL on ESPN.

== Early life ==
Subban's parents both emigrated to Ontario from the Caribbean in the 1970s. His father, Karl, moved from Jamaica to Sudbury, and his mother, Maria, came from Montserrat to Hamilton. Karl is a retired school principal. Subban was born in Toronto and raised in the city's Rexdale neighbourhood. He has four siblings: Nastassia, Natasha, Jordan and Malcolm.

P. K., Malcolm, and Jordan all played for the Belleville Bulls during their junior career. Growing up, Subban was good friends with Toronto Maple Leafs player John Tavares. He also played and won a Triple-A Novice title with Tampa Bay Lightning captain and star Steven Stamkos.

Although he was raised in Toronto, Subban did not grow up as a fan of the hometown Toronto Maple Leafs. He revealed on the Montreal talk show Tout le monde en parle that he always wanted to play for Montreal ever since he was a kid. He also said that Canadiens' legend Jean Béliveau was one of his biggest idols growing up as a hockey player.

== Playing career ==
=== Junior ===
Subban spent his junior career with the Belleville Bulls of the Ontario Hockey League (OHL). In 2005–06, he recorded 12 points in a 52-game rookie campaign. In 2006–07, he improved to 56 points in 68 games, where he was later drafted by the Canadiens in the off-season at the 2007 NHL entry draft. Subban then recorded 46 points in just 58 games during the 2007–08 campaign, before adding 23 points and matching his regular season goals total of eight in the post-season. He helped Belleville to the J. Ross Robertson Cup Finals against the Kitchener Rangers, where they lost the OHL title in seven games. Subban finished his four-year junior career with 76 points in 56 games in the 2008–09 regular season, with the Bulls advancing to the league playoffs, later losing in the OHL semi-finals.

=== Professional ===
==== Montreal Canadiens (2009–2016) ====
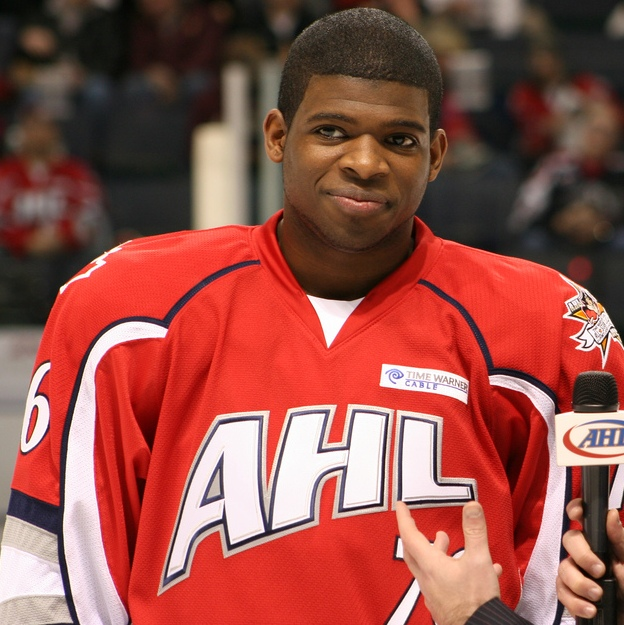
Subban at the 2010 AHL All-Star Game. He began the 2009–10 season with the AHL's Hamilton Bulldogs.

In May 2009, two weeks after his last junior game, Subban was signed to a three-year, entry-level contract by the Canadiens. He began the 2009–10 season with the Hamilton Bulldogs, Montreal's American Hockey League (AHL) affiliate. Later in the season, he was then selected to play in the 2010 AHL All-Star Game in Portland. Shortly thereafter, he earned his first call-up to the Canadiens on February 11, 2010. On the following day, Subban registered his first career NHL point, an assist, in his debut against the Philadelphia Flyers on February 12.

On April 26, 2010, Subban was recalled from Hamilton during the Canadiens' first round Stanley Cup playoff series against the Washington Capitals. He recorded his first NHL playoff point, an assist, in his first career NHL playoff game, on April 26. His first goal came in Game 1 of the Canadiens' second round series against the Pittsburgh Penguins on April 30. In Game 3 against the Philadelphia Flyers in the 2010 Eastern Conference Finals, Subban became the third rookie defenceman in Canadiens history to register three assists in one game. In all, Subban recorded one goal and seven assists for eight points in 14 playoff games for the Canadiens, who ultimately fell to Philadelphia 4-1 in the series.

After the Canadiens were eliminated by the Flyers, Subban was returned to the Bulldogs, who were still in contention in the Calder Cup playoffs. At the end of the AHL season, Subban was awarded the AHL President's Award in recognition of his accomplishments for the year.

On March 20, 2011, Subban became the first Canadiens rookie defenceman to score a hat-trick in a game, which came in an 8–1 victory over the Minnesota Wild.

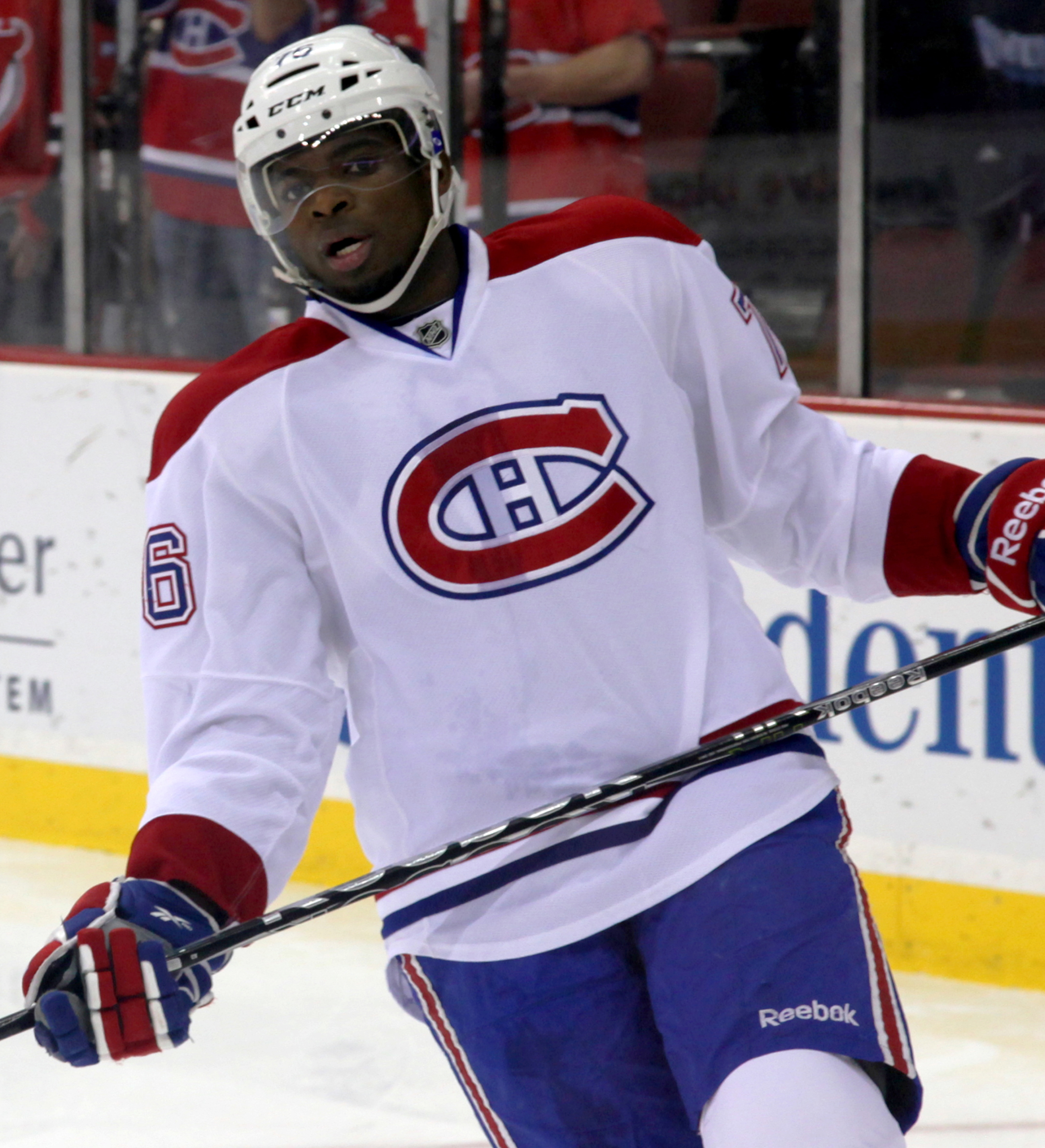
Subban with the Montreal Canadiens in February 2012.

Playing in 81 games in the 2011–12 season, Subban recorded seven goals and 29 assists for 36 points.

A restricted free agent after the season, Subban sat out the first four games of the 2012–13 season, which was postponed until January 2013 due to a labour lock-out, while the two sides negotiated a contract. On January 28, 2013, however, Subban eventually signed a two-year, $5.75 million deal with Montreal. He scored 11 goals and 27 assists, matching his career-high 38 points despite playing in only 42 games due to the lock-out. At the end of the season, he was awarded with the James Norris Memorial Trophy as the NHL's defenceman of the year, edging-out Kris Letang and Ryan Suter for the honour. On July 3, 2013, Subban was named to the NHL first All-Star team.

Subban then played all 82 games during the 2013–14 season, in which he registered a total of 53 points, ten of which were goals. During the 2014 playoffs, he was one of Montreal's most important assets, registering 14 points in 17 games as the Canadiens ultimately reached the Eastern Conference Finals, falling in six games to the New York Rangers.

Subban became a restricted free agent at the close of the 2013–14 season when his contract expired. According to the NHL Collective Bargaining Agreement (CBA), Subban earned the right to salary arbitration, having signed his first Standard Player Contract between the ages of 18 and 20 and having accrued four years of professional experience or more. He subsequently filed for arbitration before the deadline of July 5. The hearing took place on August 1, 2014, with Subban's camp asking for a one-year contract worth $8.5 million, while the Canadiens offered a one-year contract worth $5.5 million.

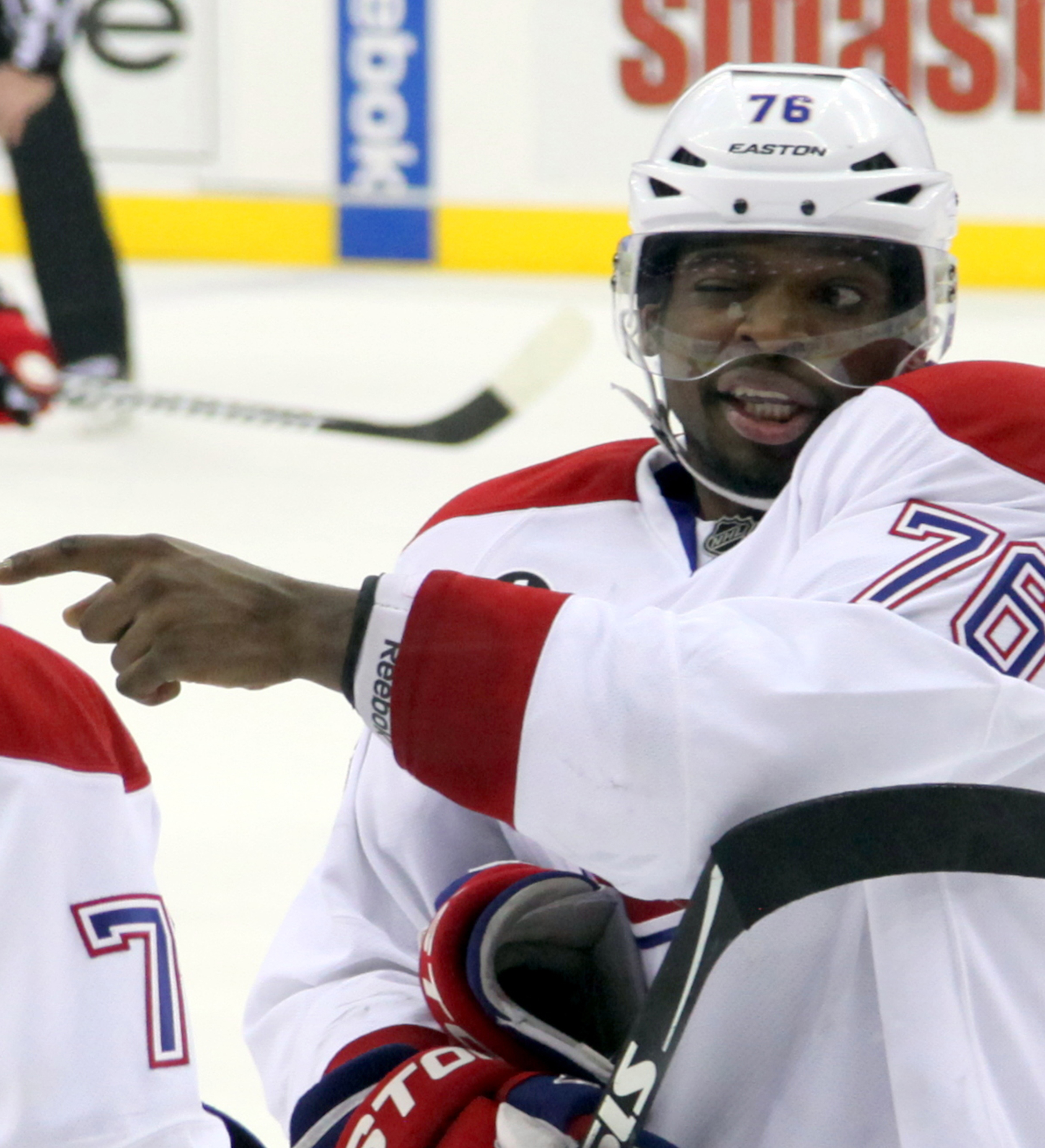
Subban with the Canadiens in January 2015. Subban signed an eight-year extension with the Canadiens the summer prior to the start of the 2014–15 season.

Under NHL CBA rules, the parties could continue to negotiate and reach an agreement until the arbitrator announced her decision, given in the 48 hours following the hearing. As arbitration was player-elected, once the arbitrator released her decision, the team would have had 48 hours to agree to the terms or walk away from the player, thereby making Subban an unrestricted free agent. The day after the hearing, on August 2, it was announced that Subban and the Habs had agreed to terms on an eight-year, $72 million contract, running through the 2021–22 season. The contract made him the highest-paid defenceman in the NHL and third-highest-paid League player overall at the time. It included a no-trade clause that would take effect July 1, 2016.

On September 15, 2014, Subban was named an alternate captain of the Canadiens along with Max Pacioretty, Tomáš Plekanec, and Andrei Markov as Montreal head coach Michel Therrien elected not to name a captain following Brian Gionta's departure to the Buffalo Sabres in the 2014 off-season.

==== Nashville Predators (2016–2019) ====
On June 29, 2016, Subban, in a blockbuster move, was traded to the Nashville Predators in exchange for defenceman Shea Weber. In his first season with the club, Subban recorded 10 goals, 30 assists and 40 points in 66 games. The Predators qualified for the 2017 playoffs in the final wild card spot in the Western Conference. The team advanced to the 2017 Stanley Cup Final against the Pittsburgh Penguins, but were defeated in six games. Subban finished the postseason with 12 points in all 22 games played.

On May 2, 2018, Subban was named one of three finalists for the King Clancy Memorial Trophy as a player who best exemplifies leadership qualities and gives back to his community. The award eventually went to Daniel and Henrik Sedin.

==== New Jersey Devils (2019–2022) ====
On June 22, 2019, the second day of the 2019 NHL entry draft, Subban was traded to the New Jersey Devils in exchange for Steven Santini, prospect Jérémy Davies, and two second-round draft picks in an effort for the Predators to free up salary cap space. Subban faced one of his former clubs, the Montreal Canadiens, for the first time on November 16 a 4–3 Devils' victory. Subban faced another one of his former clubs, the Nashville Predators on December 7, a 6–4 Predators' victory. In that game, Subban was given a tribute video and a standing ovation from Predators fans.

Subban's debut season in New Jersey was statistically the worst season of his career, recording just 18 points in 68 games and a career worst plus–minus of −21. At season's end, Subban was nominated for the King Clancy Memorial Trophy. He would later be a finalist for and win the same award in 2022, in recognition of his commitment to "racial and social justice, underserved youth, COVID-19 relief and youth hockey."

On September 20, 2022, Subban announced his retirement from professional ice hockey.

== International play ==
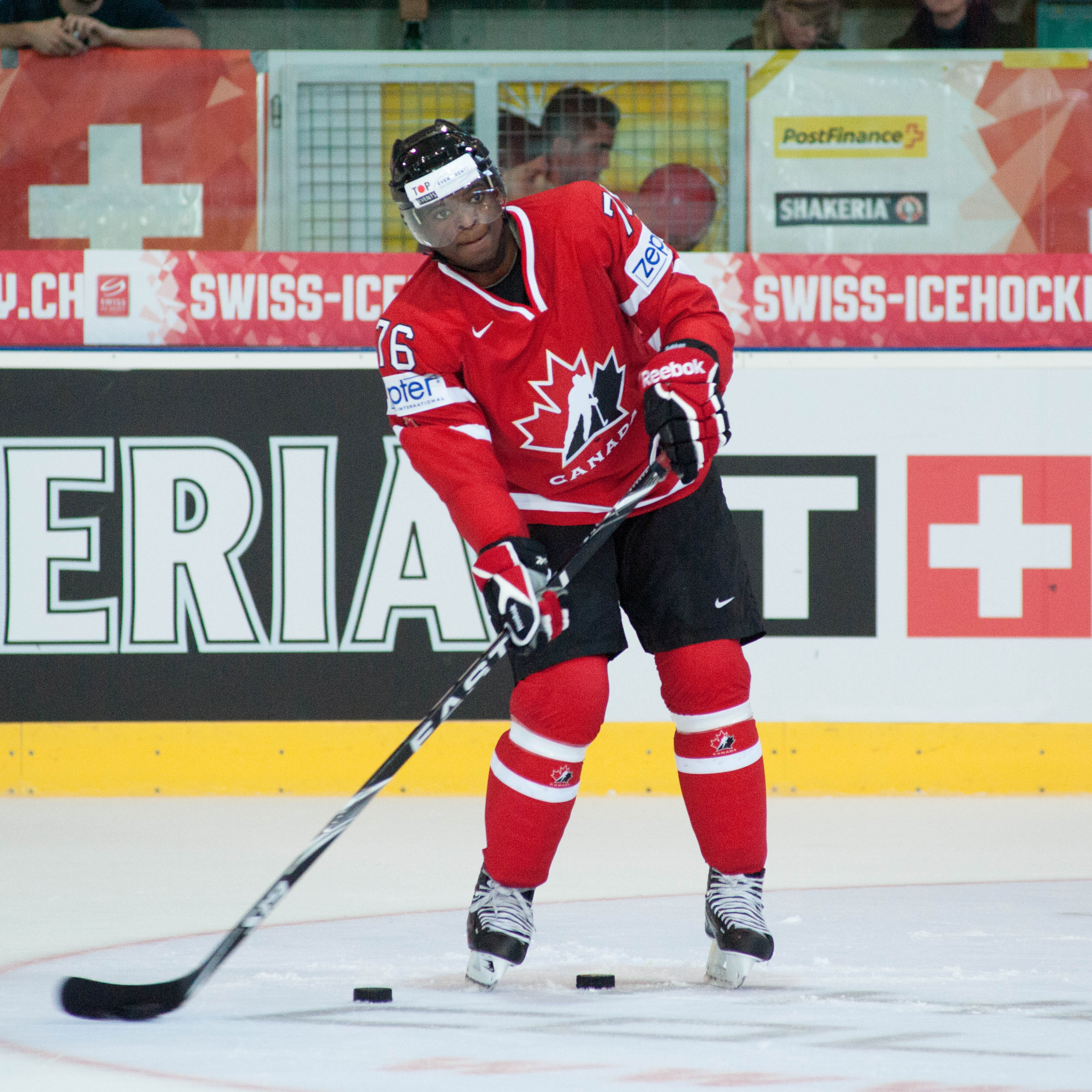
- Subban with Team Canada during an exhibition game against Switzerland in 2012

Medal record

Representing Canada

Ice hockey

Olympic Games
| Gold medal – first place | 2014 Sochi | |

World Junior Championships
| Gold medal – first place | 2008 Czech Republic | |
| Gold medal – first place | 2009 Canada | |

Subban was selected to play for Canada at the 2008 World Junior Ice Hockey Championships in the Czech Republic. He saw limited ice time as Canada's seventh defenceman, but was able to help the team capture their fourth consecutive gold medal at the tournament, defeating Sweden in overtime in the final. Subban again represented Canada at the 2009 World Juniors in Ottawa, taking on a more central role with the team. He scored three goals and nine points and a differential of +12 in the tournament, helping Canada to its fifth consecutive gold medal as they once again defeated Sweden in the final. Subban was named to the Tournament All-Star team, along with Cody Hodgson and tournament MVP John Tavares.

Subban was invited to participate in the 2012 IIHF World Championship, but was injured during pre-tournament play. In the next season, Subban was a late addition to the Canadian team at the 2013 edition of the tournament; he joined them in the elimination round for one game, which Canada lost. On January 7, 2014, Subban was named to Canada's 2014 Winter Olympic team for participation in the games in Sochi in defence of their 2010 gold medal. They won gold, prevailing 3–0 over Sweden in the tournament final.

== Personal life ==
Subban's brother Malcolm is a goaltender who was selected by the Boston Bruins in the first round of the 2012 NHL entry draft. During the Vegas Golden Knights' inaugural season (2017–2018), Malcolm and P.K. faced each other in the NHL regular season for the first time in a December 8, 2017 game on the elder Subban's home ice (Nashville's Bridgestone Arena). Malcolm, starting in net for the injured Marc-André Fleury, earned the win. His brother Jordan was drafted by the Vancouver Canucks in the fourth round of the 2013 NHL entry draft.

During the 2018 NHL Awards, Subban was revealed as the cover athlete for the NHL 19 video game.

In June 2018, Subban began a relationship with American skier Lindsey Vonn. On August 23, 2019, they announced their engagement, and on Christmas Day 2019, Vonn proposed to Subban. On December 29, 2020, they both announced their breakup on Instagram. Vonn announced that the two had parted ways and remained friends.

On October 21, 2020, Subban and Vonn were announced as members of the ownership group of Angel City FC, a Los Angeles-based team that started play in the National Women's Soccer League in 2022.

In November 2022, ESPN announced that Subban had signed a three-year contract to become a full-time in-studio analyst at the network.

=== Endorsements ===
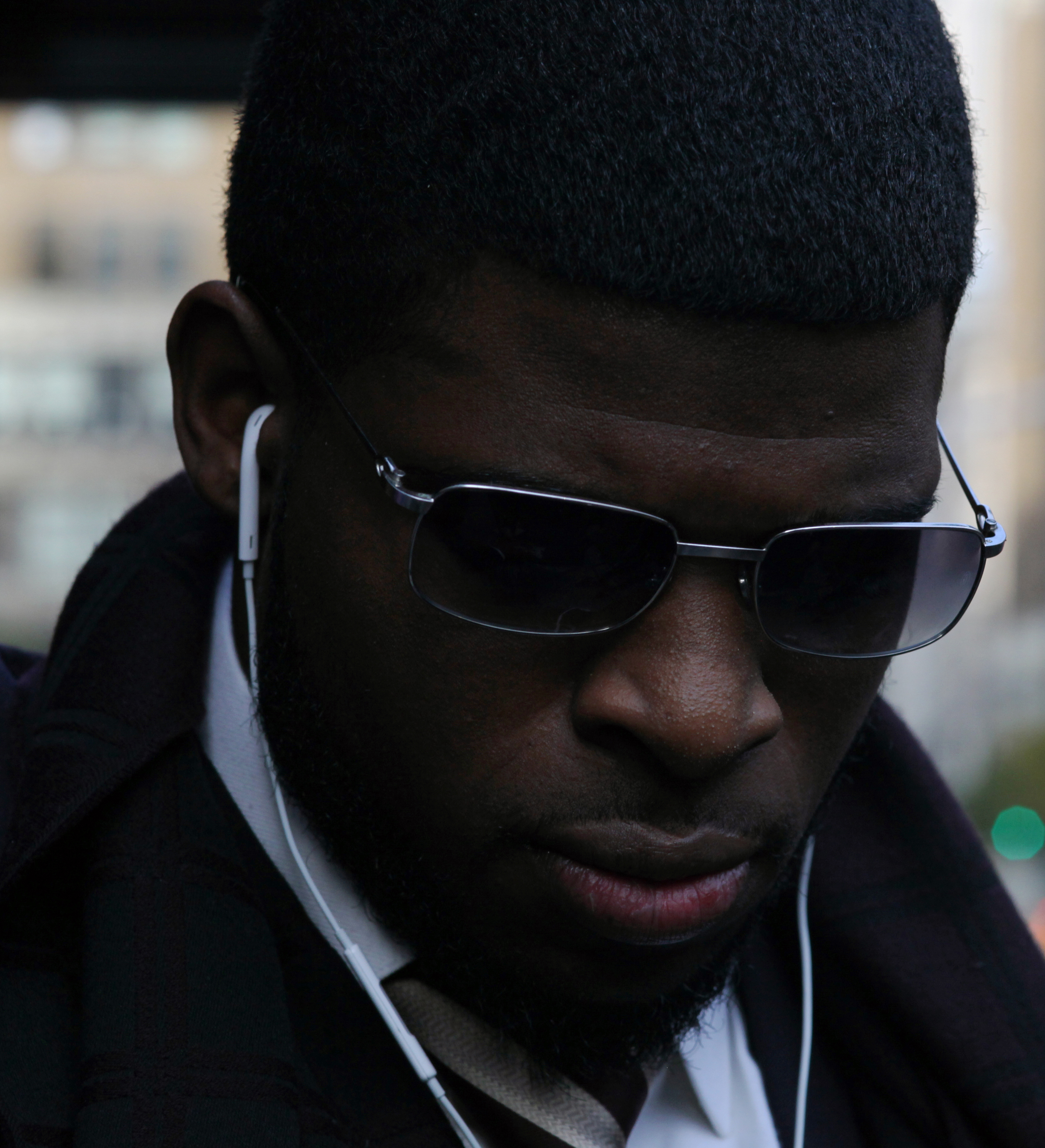
Subban signing autographs in October 2013

In addition to the RW&CO. deal, Subban's marketing company, P.K.S.S., has landed him several business partnerships including ones with Adidas, Bridgestone, Gatorade and Air Canada.

=== Personality and style ===
Subban is known for his exciting and hard-hitting style of play as well as having a colourful personality that has been criticized by some as brash and self-absorbed. In an interview with ESPN.com, he addressed it:

A lot of things are said about me. And maybe if I didn't play in Montreal to start my career, a lot of those things would not have made news. But when you're in Montreal, everything gets kind of blown up and everything becomes news, which is fine. None of that stuff ever really bothered me. I'm not that self-absorbed where I think everybody on the planet is going to love me or love everything about me. They're all not going to love the way I play the game or think I'm the best-looking guy in the world. It's just not going to happen. You're going to have people disagree. They may not think how I play the game is the right way. Or they may not think everything I do is truly authentic and real, but that's just life. What are you going to do? All you do is continue to work on yourself every day as a player and as a person, and that's it. I try to get better every day and continue to do good things, not just for myself, but for the people around me, and just create good energy around me wherever I go, because that's the only way to live, in my opinion.

Off the ice, Subban has a well-known, stylish sense of fashion. He often is seen in designer suits and unique accessories. That appreciation of style has been parlayed into being the spokesman for a RW-CO line of suits. Subban was ranked in the top 50 of Best Dressed athletes by Sports Illustrated and made their alternate cover page in July 2018. In May 2019, P.K. Subban showcased his hatmaker Gunner Foxx and bespoke tailor and shoemaker Sartorialto for GQ Magazine.

=== Philanthropy ===
On September 16, 2015, Subban announced a commitment to raise $10 million for the Montreal Children's Hospital by 2022. The hospital called it "the biggest philanthropic commitment by a sports figure in Canadian history". After his donation, Subban continued his commitment as spokesman and organized the "Winter Wonderland" with Air Canada at the hospital before the holidays. In 2017, he was awarded the Meritorious Service Cross (Civil Division) in recognition of how his "generous gift stands as an example of how professional athletes can positively change lives in their communities". He was also added to the Google.org Impact Challenge judge panel in Canada, to help choose which organizations should receive money to help Canada. After his trade to Nashville, Subban continued his philanthropy. The "P.K.'s Blue Line Buddies" focused on building better relations between law enforcement and inner-city youths, by treating a police officer, a youth and their guests to a Predators home game with perks like autographs and dinner in Bridgestone Arena's Patron Platinum Club. After being traded to the New Jersey Devils, Subban continued his Blue Line Buddies initiative in New Jersey. Subban wanted to make sure that his program reached out to somewhere other than Nashville. In January 2018, Subban appeared on The Daily Show to discuss his philanthropy efforts with the children's hospital and his Blue Line Buddies program.

In June 2020, Subban donated US$50,000 to the GoFundMe effort to raise money for Gianna Floyd, the daughter of the late George Floyd.

== Career statistics ==
=== Regular season and playoffs ===
| | | | Regular season | | | | | Playoffs |
| Season | Team | League | GP | G | A | Pts | PIM | GP | G | A | Pts | PIM |
|---|---|---|---|---|---|---|---|---|---|---|---|---|
| 2005–06 | Belleville Bulls | OHL | 52 | 5 | 7 | 12 | 70 | 3 | 0 | 0 | 0 | 2 |
| 2006–07 | Belleville Bulls | OHL | 68 | 15 | 41 | 56 | 89 | 15 | 5 | 8 | 13 | 26 |
| 2007–08 | Belleville Bulls | OHL | 58 | 8 | 38 | 46 | 100 | 21 | 8 | 15 | 23 | 28 |
| 2008–09 | Belleville Bulls | OHL | 56 | 14 | 62 | 76 | 94 | 17 | 3 | 12 | 15 | 22 |
| 2009–10 | Hamilton Bulldogs | AHL | 77 | 18 | 35 | 53 | 82 | 7 | 3 | 7 | 10 | 6 |
| 2009–10 | Montreal Canadiens | NHL | 2 | 0 | 2 | 2 | 2 | 14 | 1 | 7 | 8 | 6 |
| 2010–11 | Montreal Canadiens | NHL | 77 | 14 | 24 | 38 | 124 | 7 | 2 | 2 | 4 | 2 |
| 2011–12 | Montreal Canadiens | NHL | 81 | 7 | 29 | 36 | 119 | — | — | — | — | — |
| 2012–13 | Montreal Canadiens | NHL | 42 | 11 | 27 | 38 | 57 | 5 | 2 | 2 | 4 | 31 |
| 2013–14 | Montreal Canadiens | NHL | 82 | 10 | 43 | 53 | 81 | 17 | 5 | 9 | 14 | 24 |
| 2014–15 | Montreal Canadiens | NHL | 82 | 15 | 45 | 60 | 74 | 12 | 1 | 7 | 8 | 31 |
| 2015–16 | Montreal Canadiens | NHL | 68 | 6 | 45 | 51 | 75 | — | — | — | — | — |
| 2016–17 | Nashville Predators | NHL | 66 | 10 | 30 | 40 | 44 | 22 | 2 | 10 | 12 | 29 |
| 2017–18 | Nashville Predators | NHL | 82 | 16 | 43 | 59 | 82 | 13 | 4 | 5 | 9 | 10 |
| 2018–19 | Nashville Predators | NHL | 63 | 9 | 22 | 31 | 60 | 6 | 1 | 2 | 3 | 0 |
| 2019–20 | New Jersey Devils | NHL | 68 | 7 | 11 | 18 | 79 | — | — | — | — | — |
| 2020–21 | New Jersey Devils | NHL | 44 | 5 | 14 | 19 | 26 | — | — | — | — | — |
| 2021–22 | New Jersey Devils | NHL | 77 | 5 | 17 | 22 | 82 | — | — | — | — | — |
| NHL totals | | | 834 | 115 | 352 | 467 | 905 | 96 | 18 | 44 | 62 | 133 |

=== International ===
| Year | Team | Event | Result | GP | G | A | Pts | PIM |
|---|---|---|---|---|---|---|---|---|
| 2006 | Canada Ontario | U17 | 5th | 5 | 0 | 1 | 1 | 0 |
| 2008 | Canada | WJC | 1st place, gold medalist(s) | 7 | 0 | 0 | 0 | 2 |
| 2009 | Canada | WJC | 1st place, gold medalist(s) | 6 | 3 | 6 | 9 | 6 |
| 2013 | Canada | WC | 5th | 1 | 0 | 0 | 0 | 0 |
| 2014 | Canada | OG | 1st place, gold medalist(s) | 1 | 0 | 0 | 0 | 0 |
| Junior totals | | | | 18 | 3 | 7 | 10 | 8 |
| Senior totals | | | | 2 | 0 | 0 | 0 | 0 |

== Awards and honours ==
| Award | Year |
OHL
| First All-Star team | 2009 |
AHL
| All-Rookie Team | 2010 |
| AHL All-Star Game | 2010 |
| First All-Star team | 2010 |
NHL
| NHL All-Rookie Team | 2011 |
| James Norris Memorial Trophy | 2013 |
| NHL first All-Star team | 2013, 2015 |
| NHL All-Star Game | 2016, 2017, 2018 |
| NHL second All-Star team | 2018 |
| EA Sports NHL cover athlete | 2019 |
| King Clancy Memorial Trophy | 2022 |
International
| WJC All-Star team | 2009 |

== See also ==
- Black players in ice hockey
- List of black NHL players

Awards and achievements
| Preceded by Erik Karlsson | Winner of the James Norris Memorial Trophy; 2013 | Succeeded by Duncan Keith |
| Preceded by Pekka Rinne | King Clancy Memorial Trophy winner 2022 | Succeeded by Mikael Backlund |
