= Karl Subban =

Jamaican-Canadian educator and writer

Karl Subban is a Jamaican-Canadian educator and writer, best known as the father of National Hockey League (NHL) players P. K. Subban, Malcolm Subban and Jordan Subban.

Born in Jamaica, he came to Canada with his family as a pre-teen in the early 1970s, and settled in Sudbury, Ontario. Living in the predominantly francophone Flour Mill neighbourhood, he integrated into the community by playing neighbourhood street hockey, although he never played in an organized league. He later also played basketball for Sudbury Secondary School and Lakehead University. At Lakehead, he remains the fifth all-time leading scorer for the school's basketball team.

Following his graduation from Lakehead he became an elementary school teacher with the Toronto District School Board, until retiring from teaching in 2013. By this time his three sons were all playing in the NHL, with Karl becoming well known in his own right as a prominent "hockey dad".

In 2017 he published the non-fiction book How We Did It: The Subban Plan for Success in Hockey, School and Life. His children's book The Hockey Skates, illustrated by Maggie Zeng and recounting a true story from P.K.'s childhood, was published in 2023, and was selected for the 2025 edition of CBC Kids Reads.

In the 2020s he was also a prominent campaigner for banning sports betting advertising. In 2026, he gave a talk on race and hockey in conjunction with a National Canadian Film Day screening of the Black Canadian hockey drama film Youngblood at the Acton Film Festival.
