= Mike Weber =

American ice hockey player (born 1987)

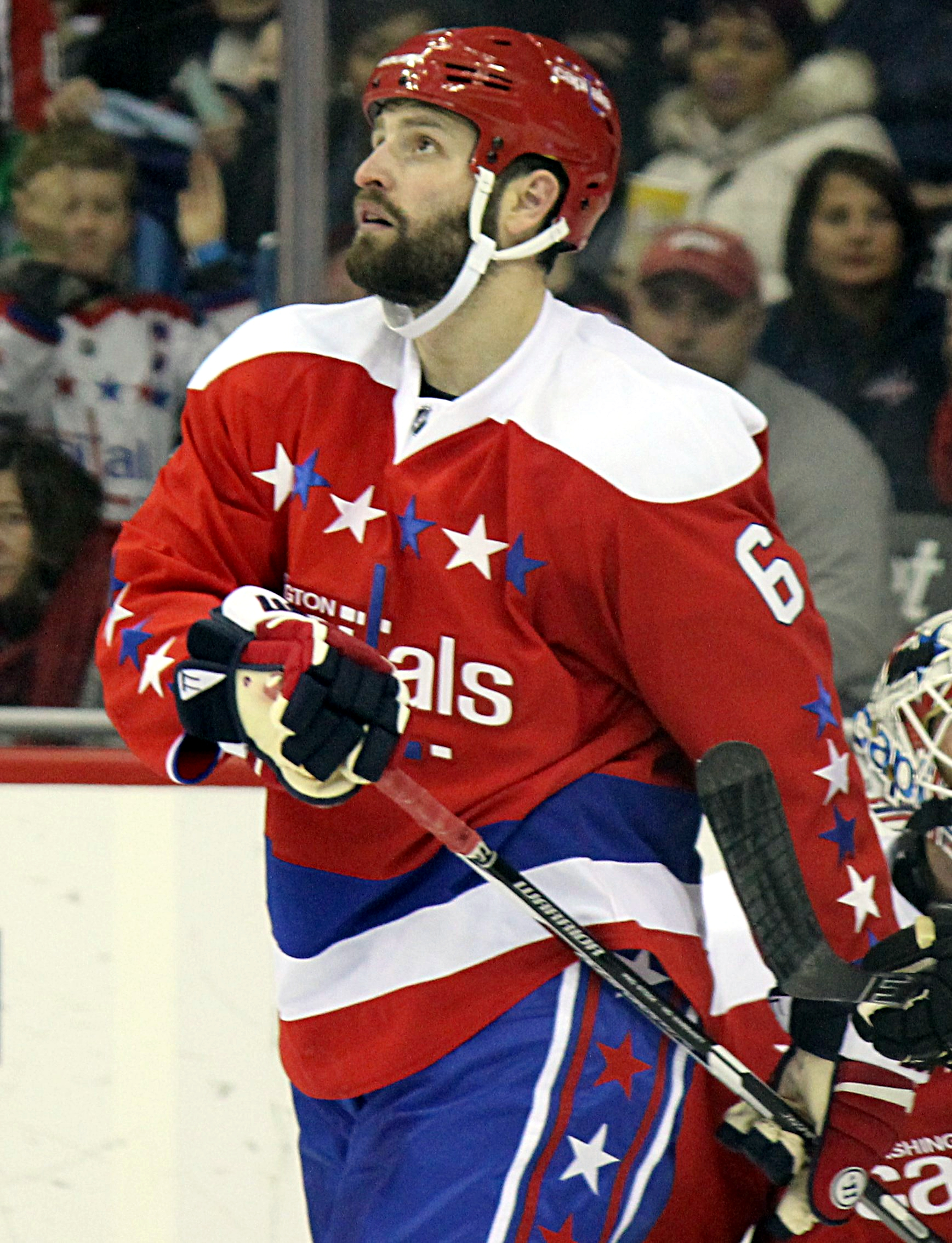
- Weber with the Capitals in 2016.
- Born: December 16, 1987 (age 38) Pittsburgh, Pennsylvania, U.S.
- Height: 6 ft 2 in (188 cm)
- Weight: 217 lb (98 kg; 15 st 7 lb)
- Position: Defense
- Shot: Left
- Played for: Buffalo Sabres; Lørenskog IK; Washington Capitals; Frölunda HC
- NHL draft: 57th overall, 2006; Buffalo Sabres
- Playing career: 2007–2017

Michael Weber (born December 16, 1987) is an American former professional ice hockey defenseman. He previously played with the Buffalo Sabres and Washington Capitals of the National Hockey League (NHL) and Frölunda HC of the Swedish Hockey League (SHL). He most recently served as an assistant coach for the St. Louis Blues in the National Hockey League (NHL).

== Playing career ==
=== Early ===
Weber played hockey for the Pittsburgh Junior B Penguins as a youth. He began his major junior career with the Windsor Spitfires of the Ontario Hockey League during the 2003-04 season. Following his third season with the club, Weber was drafted in the second round, 57th overall, by the Buffalo Sabres during the 2006 NHL entry draft. In his final major junior season, Weber was traded to the Barrie Colts.

=== Professional ===
==== Buffalo Sabres ====
Weber joined the Sabres' American Hockey League affiliate, the Rochester Americans, for the 2007–08 AHL season. He was called up by the Sabres on two occasions early in the same season. He was recalled for a third time in March 2008 and scored his first NHL point on March 12 with an assist in his hometown against the Pittsburgh Penguins. His first NHL goal was scored on December 28, 2010, against Nikolai Khabibulin of the Edmonton Oilers.

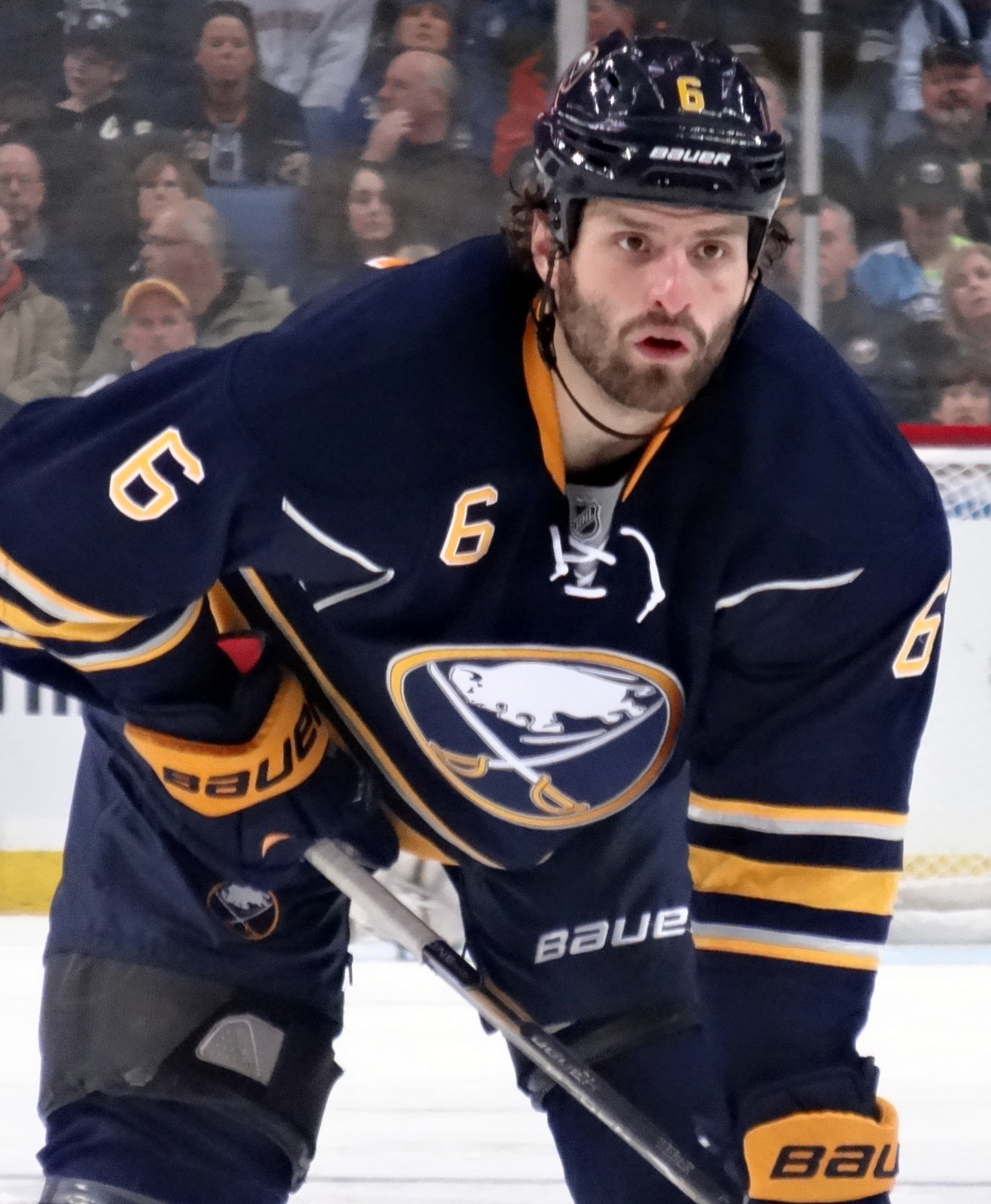
Weber with the Sabres in 2013.

On July 4, 2011, the Sabres signed Weber to a two-year, $1.9 million contract extension. Weber struggled during the 2011–12 season as he finished it with a minus-19 with the Sabres failing to make the playoffs. His play improved a lot for the shortened 2012–13 season after the acquisition of his longtime best friend Steve Ott. Weber established himself as a leader to the Sabres young defensive core. However, the Sabres once again failed to make the playoffs for the second season in a row. Due to his improvement the Sabres re-signed Weber to a 3-year, $5 million contract extension.

On February 20, 2015, after being on the receiving end of a borderline hit by Tanner Glass of the New York Rangers, Weber lifted Glass by the scruff of the neck and over the ice to be delivered to the game's linesmen to serve his penalty. Weber left the game early, provoking a fight between Glass and Weber's teammate Tyson Strachan.

==== Washington Capitals ====
During the 2015–16 season, having spent all nine of his professional years with the Sabres, Weber was traded to the Washington Capitals for a third round pick in the 2017 NHL entry draft on February 23, 2016. Used sparingly as a depth defenseman, Weber was unable to help the Capitals progress deep into the playoffs, and became a free agent over the summer.

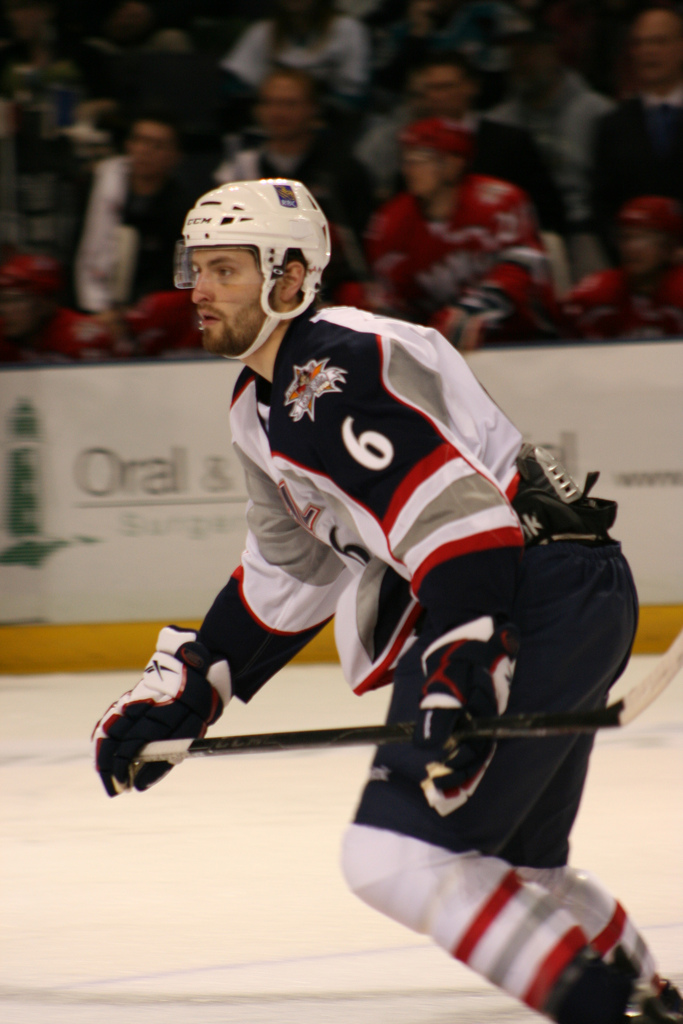
Weber in the 2010 AHL All-Star Game.

==== Later career ====
On August 25, 2016, unable to secure an NHL contract, Weber agreed to a professional try out contract with the St. Louis Blues. He was released from his PTO on October 7. He went on to sign a two-way professional try-out contract with the Iowa Wild on October 20, 2016. In adding veteran leadership, Weber quickly established himself as team captain and on February 28, 2017, he was signed to a two-way contract with NHL affiliate, the Minnesota Wild, for the remainder of the season.

Weber signed with Frölunda HC of the Swedish Hockey League on November 9, 2017. However, after just 10 games with the club, Weber announced his retirement from professional hockey on December 27 due to a lingering knee injury.

== Coaching career ==
Following his retirement from professional hockey Mike Weber joined the Windsor Spitfires, his former OHL team, as an assistant coach in January 2018.

On September 17, 2020, Weber was hired as an assistant coach by his former team, the Rochester Americans, of the American Hockey League.

On June 14, 2023, Weber was hired by the St. Louis Blues as an assistant coach. On April 17, 2026, the Blues announced they would not renew his contract for the 2026–27 season.

== Personal ==
Weber was raised in suburban Pittsburgh and attended Seneca Valley High School in Harmony, Pennsylvania, and later attended St. Anne's High School in Tecumseh, Ontario, while playing in the OHL.

His father looks like Jeff Foxworthy.

== Career statistics ==
| | | | Regular season | | | | | Playoffs |
| Season | Team | League | GP | G | A | Pts | PIM | GP | G | A | Pts | PIM |
|---|---|---|---|---|---|---|---|---|---|---|---|---|
| 2002–03 | Pittsburgh Jr. Penguins | EmJHL | 28 | 4 | 11 | 15 | 109 | 3 | 0 | 0 | 0 | 20 |
| 2003–04 | Windsor Spitfires | OHL | 65 | 0 | 2 | 2 | 49 | — | — | — | — | — |
| 2004–05 | Windsor Spitfires | OHL | 68 | 2 | 6 | 8 | 132 | 11 | 0 | 1 | 1 | 18 |
| 2005–06 | Windsor Spitfires | OHL | 68 | 5 | 21 | 26 | 181 | 7 | 0 | 0 | 0 | 12 |
| 2006–07 | Windsor Spitfires | OHL | 30 | 3 | 16 | 19 | 86 | — | — | — | — | — |
| 2006–07 | Barrie Colts | OHL | 30 | 3 | 12 | 15 | 86 | 7 | 0 | 6 | 6 | 10 |
| 2007–08 | Rochester Americans | AHL | 59 | 1 | 13 | 14 | 178 | — | — | — | — | — |
| 2007–08 | Buffalo Sabres | NHL | 16 | 0 | 3 | 3 | 14 | — | — | — | — | — |
| 2008–09 | Portland Pirates | AHL | 42 | 1 | 7 | 8 | 94 | — | — | — | — | — |
| 2008–09 | Buffalo Sabres | NHL | 7 | 0 | 0 | 0 | 19 | — | — | — | — | — |
| 2009–10 | Portland Pirates | AHL | 80 | 5 | 16 | 21 | 153 | 4 | 1 | 0 | 1 | 14 |
| 2010–11 | Buffalo Sabres | NHL | 58 | 4 | 13 | 17 | 69 | 7 | 0 | 1 | 1 | 6 |
| 2011–12 | Buffalo Sabres | NHL | 51 | 1 | 4 | 5 | 64 | — | — | — | — | — |
| 2012–13 | Lørenskog IK | NOR | 5 | 1 | 5 | 6 | 10 | — | — | — | — | — |
| 2012–13 | Buffalo Sabres | NHL | 42 | 1 | 6 | 7 | 70 | — | — | — | — | — |
| 2013–14 | Buffalo Sabres | NHL | 68 | 1 | 8 | 9 | 73 | — | — | — | — | — |
| 2014–15 | Buffalo Sabres | NHL | 64 | 1 | 6 | 7 | 68 | — | — | — | — | — |
| 2015–16 | Buffalo Sabres | NHL | 35 | 1 | 4 | 5 | 32 | — | — | — | — | — |
| 2015–16 | Washington Capitals | NHL | 10 | 0 | 0 | 0 | 28 | 2 | 0 | 0 | 0 | 0 |
| 2016–17 | Iowa Wild | AHL | 56 | 1 | 7 | 8 | 92 | — | — | — | — | — |
| 2017–18 | Frölunda HC | SHL | 10 | 0 | 3 | 3 | 12 | — | — | — | — | — |
| NHL totals | | | 351 | 9 | 44 | 53 | 437 | 9 | 0 | 1 | 1 | 6 |
| AHL totals | | | 237 | 8 | 43 | 51 | 517 | 4 | 1 | 0 | 1 | 14 |
