= Jordan Subban =

Canadian ice hockey player

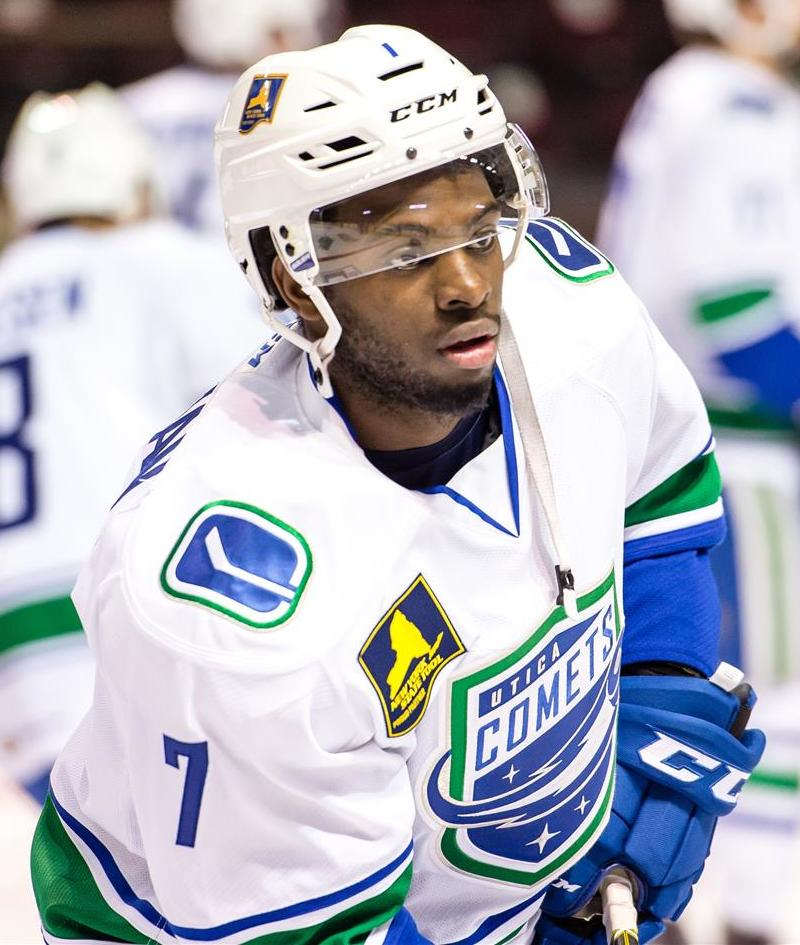
- Subban with the Utica Comets in 2015
- Born: March 3, 1995 (age 31) Toronto, Ontario, Canada
- Height: 5 ft 9 in (175 cm)
- Weight: 185 lb (84 kg; 13 st 3 lb)
- Position: Defence
- Shot: Right
- Played for: Utica Comets; Ontario Reign; Toronto Marlies; Dornbirn Bulldogs; Hershey Bears
- NHL draft: 115th overall, 2013; Vancouver Canucks
- Playing career: 2015–2022

Jordan-Carmichael Subban (/ˈsubæn/ SOO-ban; born March 3, 1995) is a Canadian former professional ice hockey defenceman. He was selected by the Vancouver Canucks in the fourth round (115th overall) of the 2013 NHL entry draft. He is the youngest of the three Subban brothers to be drafted into the NHL, the other two being Malcolm Subban and P. K. Subban.

== Playing career ==
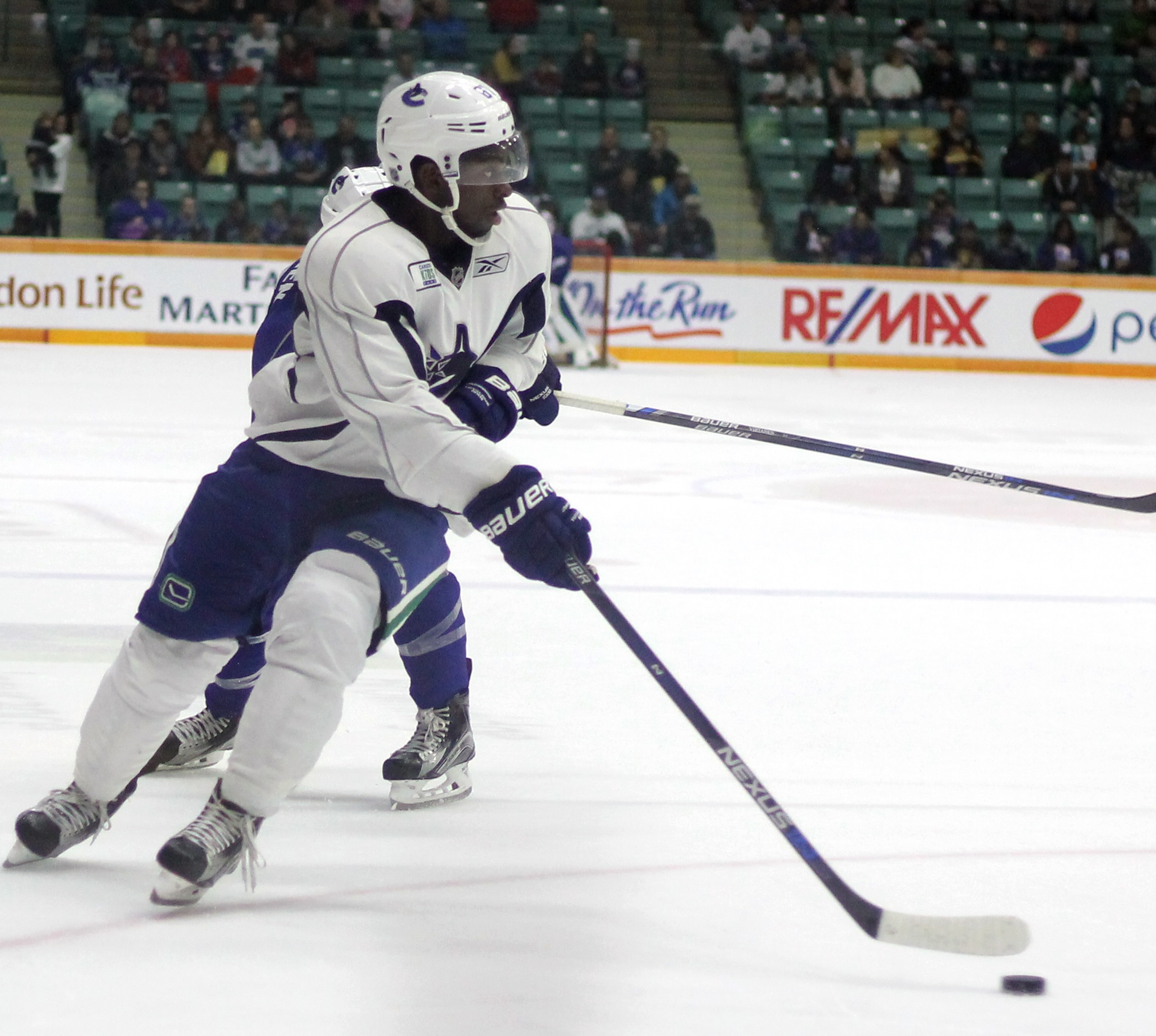
Jordan Subban at Vancouver Canucks training camp in 2015

Subban was signed by the Canucks to a three-year entry-level contract on May 14, 2015. Following their training camp for the 2015–16 season, the Canucks assigned Subban to their American Hockey League affiliate, the Utica Comets, to begin his professional career. He spent the entire season with the Comets, tallying 11 goals and 25 assists in 67 games.

At the start of the 2016–17 season, Subban was again assigned to the Comets to start the season. On January 5, 2017, Subban was named an AHL All-Star, and on January 19, the Canucks recalled Subban for his first stint in the NHL, though he did not see any game action before being returned to the Comets. On December 7, 2017, Subban was traded to the Los Angeles Kings in exchange for Nic Dowd.

After finishing the season with the Kings' AHL farm team, the Ontario Reign, Subban was not offered a contract by the Kings and was released as a free agent, whereupon he signed with the hometown Toronto Maple Leafs on a one-year, two-way contract on July 1, 2018.

Subban sat out the pandemic delayed and shortened 2020–21 season as a free agent, returning to resume his professional by agreeing to a one-year AHL contract with the Hershey Bears, a primary affiliate to the Washington Capitals, on August 12, 2021.

== Personal life ==
Subban's oldest brother, P. K. Subban, won the Norris Trophy in 2013 and played for the Montreal Canadiens, Nashville Predators, & New Jersey Devils. Another brother, Malcolm, was a goaltender for the Belleville Senators. Their father, Karl Subban, has been a noted educator and writer.

== Career statistics ==
=== Regular season and playoffs ===
			Regular season					Playoffs
Season	Team	League	GP	G	A	Pts	PIM	GP	G	A	Pts	PIM
2010–11	Toronto Marlboros	GTHL	68	21	43	64	64	—	—	—	—	—
2011–12	Belleville Bulls	OHL	56	5	15	20	31	5	0	0	0	4
2012–13	Belleville Bulls	OHL	68	15	36	51	47	17	2	3	5	20
2013–14	Belleville Bulls	OHL	66	12	30	42	63	—	—	—	—	—
2014–15	Belleville Bulls	OHL	63	25	27	52	62	4	3	0	3	2
2015–16	Utica Comets	AHL	67	11	25	36	38	4	2	1	3	2
2016–17	Utica Comets	AHL	65	16	20	36	36	—	—	—	—	—
2017–18	Utica Comets	AHL	16	0	5	5	13	—	—	—	—	—
2017–18	Ontario Reign	AHL	36	4	4	8	53	—	—	—	—	—
2018–19	Toronto Marlies	AHL	48	3	15	18	25	—	—	—	—	—
2019–20	Dornbirn Bulldogs	EBEL	47	5	11	16	39	—	—	—	—	—
2021–22	South Carolina Stingrays	ECHL	49	6	13	19	61	—	—	—	—	—
2021–22	Hershey Bears	AHL	1	0	0	0	0	—	—	—	—	—
AHL totals			233	34	69	103	165	4	2	1	3	2

=== International ===
Year	Team	Event	Result	GP	G	A	Pts	PIM
2012	Canada Ontario	U17	3rd place, bronze medalist(s)	6	1	2	3	6
2012	Canada	IH18	1st place, gold medalist(s)	5	0	1	1	0
Junior totals				11	1	3	4	6
