= Malcolm Subban =

Canadian ice hockey player (born 1993)

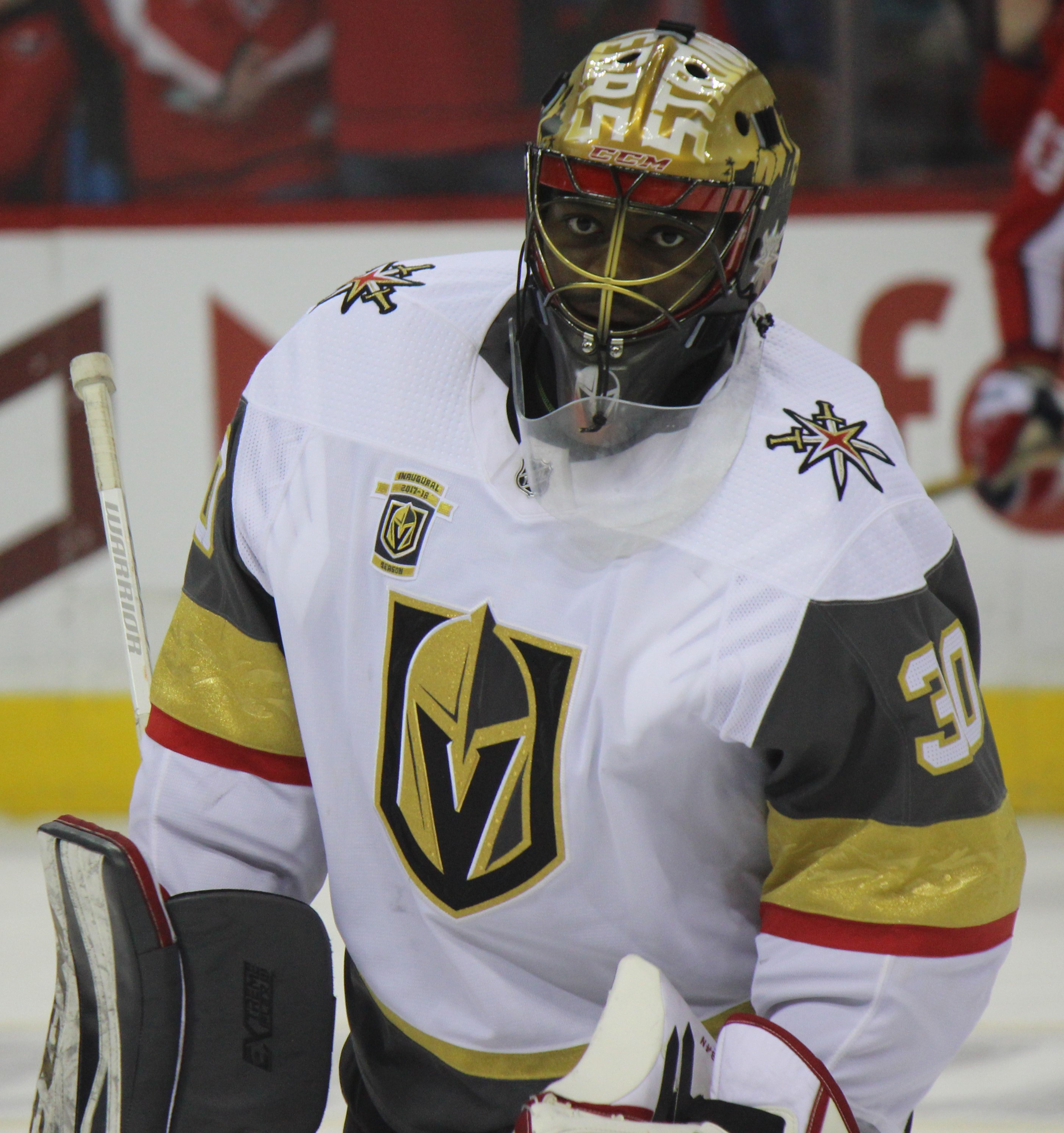
- Subban with the Vegas Golden Knights in 2018
- Born: December 21, 1993 (age 32) Toronto, Ontario, Canada
- Height: 6 ft 2 in (188 cm)
- Weight: 200 lb (91 kg; 14 st 4 lb)
- Position: Goaltender
- Catches: Left
- ELH team Former teams: HC Dynamo Pardubice; Boston Bruins; Vegas Golden Knights; Chicago Blackhawks; Buffalo Sabres; Columbus Blue Jackets
- NHL draft: 24th overall, 2012; Boston Bruins
- Playing career: 2013–present

Malcolm-Jamaal Justin Subban (/ˈsubæn/ SOO-ban; born December 21, 1993) is a Canadian professional ice hockey player who plays goaltender for HC Dynamo Pardubice of the Czech Extraliga (ELH). Subban was selected by the Boston Bruins of the National Hockey League (NHL) in the first round, 24th overall, of the 2012 NHL entry draft. He also previously played for the Vegas Golden Knights, Chicago Blackhawks, Buffalo Sabres, and Columbus Blue Jackets. He played junior hockey in the Ontario Hockey League with the Belleville Bulls.

His older brother, P. K., is a now-retired Norris Trophy-winning defenceman. His younger brother, Jordan, is a former draft pick of the Vancouver Canucks.

== Early life ==
Subban was born in Toronto, Ontario, to parents Karl and Maria. Karl starred in basketball at Lakehead University, becoming the team's fifth all-time leading scorer. Subban's brothers, P. K. and Jordan are also hockey players. P. K., the eldest, won the Norris Trophy in 2013 and played for the Montreal Canadiens, Nashville Predators, and New Jersey Devils. His younger brother, Jordan, was selected in the fourth round by the Vancouver Canucks during the 2013 NHL entry draft and currently plays for the Dornbirn Bulldogs of the Austrian Hockey League (EBEL). His older sister, Nastassia, played basketball at York University, ending her university career as the all-time leading scorer in Ontario University Athletics. Subban began playing hockey at age 3 and played defence until age 12. After switching to goaltender, he began playing in the Midget AAA level Greater Toronto Hockey League. With the Mississauga Reps, he made it to Canada's 2010 National Midget AAA Championship, where he started the final. He allowed only three goals on 58 shots in a loss.

== Playing career ==
=== Amateur ===
Subban was selected in the 11th round of the 2009 Ontario Hockey League (OHL) priority draft by the Belleville Bulls. He made his debut with the Bulls during the 2009–10 season, appearing in a single game with the club. He established himself in the 2010–11 season with the Bulls, appearing in 32 games and recording 10 wins. He was named to the OHL's 2010–11 All-Rookie Team. Heading into the 2011–12 OHL season, Subban was a highly ranked prospect for the National Hockey League (NHL)'s 2012 entry draft, and finished the season as the number one ranked goaltender in North America. Subban returned to the Bulls for 2011–12, recording 29 wins in 46 games and was named the OHL's Goaltender of the Month for November. Due to the 2012–13 NHL lockout, Subban spent the season with Belleville, appearing in 46 games with a record of 29–11–4 and .923 save percentage. The Bulls advanced to the Eastern Conference final, but were eliminated in seven games by the Barrie Colts. In total, Subban played in 17 playoff games. He was named to the OHL's 2012–13 Third All-Star Team.

=== Professional ===
==== Boston Bruins ====
The Boston Bruins made Subban the 24th overall pick of the 2012 draft. He signed a three-year contract with the club on September 6, 2012. Subban attended his first NHL training camp with the Boston Bruins ahead of the 2013–14 season. In the preseason schedule, Subban had his first opportunity to face his defenceman brother P. K. on the Montreal Canadiens squad on September 16, 2013, in a preseason match between the teams at Montreal's Bell Centre — Malcolm replaced Bruins rookie goaltender Chad Johnson at about 14 minutes into the game's second period, and managed to stop every shot in the 31:49 he played in-net, en route to a 6–3 defeat of the Canadiens. He was cut shortly after appearing in a preseason game where he allowed eight goals to the Detroit Red Wings, and assigned to Boston's American Hockey League (AHL) affiliate in Providence. In 33 games with Providence, he had a record of 15 wins, 10 losses and 5 overtime losses with a save percentage of .920 and one shutout. Providence made the 2014 Calder Cup playoffs, in which Subban appeared six times.

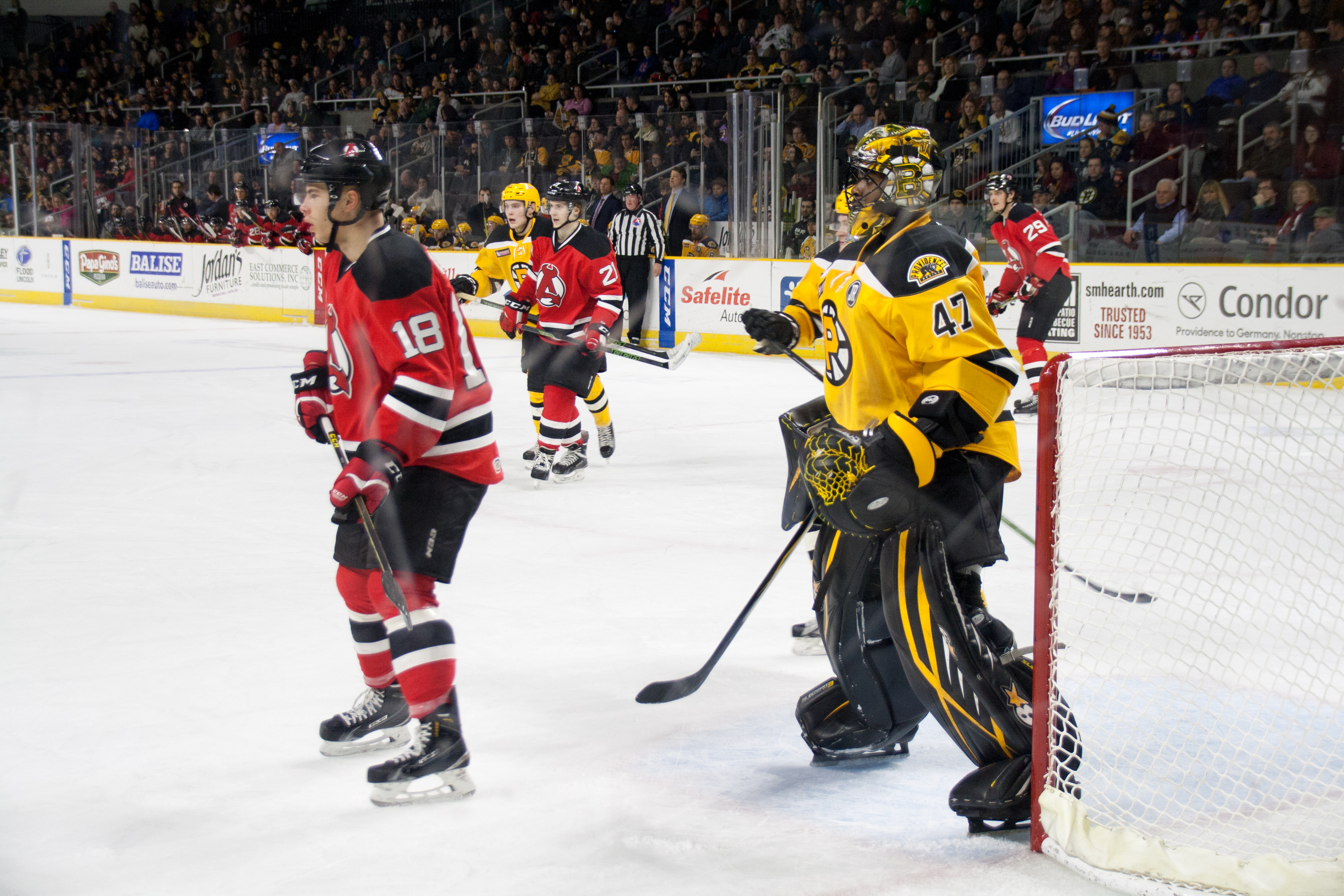
Subban was the Providence Bruins' goaltender from 2013 to 2017

He was assigned to Providence to start the 2014–15 season. During the 2014–15 Boston Bruins season, due to Boston's backup goaltender Niklas Svedberg needing conditioning with the team's AHL affiliate, Subban received his first NHL call-up to back up Tuukka Rask on January 30, 2015. He was the backup for Rask for four games, but did not appear, returning to Providence upon Svedberg's loan ending. On February 16, he was recalled again and on February 20, Subban made his NHL debut against the St. Louis Blues. He was replaced by Rask in the second period after giving up three goals on six shots, but returned later in the game in a 5–1 loss. He appeared in 35 games with Providence with a 16–13–4 record with a save percentage of .921. Providence made the 2016 Calder Cup playoffs and Subban appeared in two playoff games.

Subban began the 2015–16 season with Providence. He played in 27 games in the AHL, with a record of 14-8-5 record and a .911 save percentage. On February 6, 2016, he was hospitalized after taking a puck to the throat during pre-game warmups. The organization announced Subban would miss at least eight weeks due to a fractured larynx. After his injury healed during the 2016 off-season, Subban was assigned to Providence. He was recalled by the Bruins on October 24 after injuries to Rask and backup Anton Khudobin. He appeared in one game for Boston, starting the game that night against the Minnesota Wild, where he surrendered three goals on 16 shots, but was replaced by his backup, Zane McIntyre in the second period in a 5–0 loss. He was returned to the AHL on October 29. His play for the Providence Bruins during the 2016–17 season resulted in an 11–14–1 record, with a 2.41 goals against average (GAA) and a .917 save percentage. By the 2017 off-season, Subban, along with fellow Providence goaltender Zane McIntyre, were each re-signed by the Boston Bruins for two years, at $650,000 per year.

==== Vegas Golden Knights ====
He was placed on waivers on October 2, 2017, during the Bruins training camp after failing to beat Khudobin for the team's backup goaltender position. On October 3, Subban was claimed by the Vegas Golden Knights. He made the Golden Knights out of training camp and was the backup goalie for team's inaugural game, a 2–1 victory over the Dallas Stars on October 7. He won his first NHL game in his Vegas debut on October 15. He carried a shutout against his former team, the Boston Bruins into the final minute of the game when a puck careened of one of his teammates to finish the game 3–1. Subban started in place of the injured Marc-André Fleury. On October 22, Subban was placed on injured reserve with a lower body injury. He had been injured the previous day in a game against the St. Louis Blues. On November 17, Subban was taken off injured reserve and was the backup for Maxime Lagacé in the following game against the Los Angeles Kings. The first time Subban played a regular season game against his brother P. K. was on December 8, where Subban made a then career-high 41 saves to help the Knights beat the Nashville Predators 4–3. In doing so, the Subban brothers became the tenth set of brothers to play against one another with one a skater and another a goaltender. Subban was again placed on injured reserve, this time with an upper body injury, after being injured during practice on February 10, 2018. He finished the season appearing in 22 games with a record of 13–4–2 and a save percentage of .910.

In his second season with Vegas in 2018–19, he played in 21 games sporting a record of 8–10–2 with a save percentage of .902. He recorded his first NHL shutout in a 5–0 victory against the Winnipeg Jets on March 21, 2019. In the 2019 off-season, he filed for salary arbitration, but signed a one-year contract with Vegas before the hearing could take place. In the 2019–20 season, he appeared in 20 games for the Golden Knights, but his save percentage dropped to .890.

==== Chicago Blackhawks ====
On February 24, 2020, Subban, alongside Slava Demin and a 2020 second-round pick, was traded to the Chicago Blackhawks in exchange for goaltender Robin Lehner and Mārtiņš Dzierkals in a three-team trade also involving the Toronto Maple Leafs. Subban made his first and only appearance for the Blackhawks in 2020 on March 3, where he replaced Corey Crawford for 70 seconds during a 6–2 victory over the Anaheim Ducks, before the NHL suspended the season due to the COVID-19 pandemic on March 12.

In the following off-season, due to salary cap considerations, Subban was not tendered a qualifying offer by Blackhawks on October 8. He returned to the Blackhawks however, signing at a lower cap hit on a two-year, $1.7 million contract on October 10. He made his first start for the Blackhawks during the team's opening game of the 2020–21 season on January 14, 2021. He allowed five goals on 33 shots against the Tampa Bay Lightning en route to a 5–1 loss. On February 7, he netted his first win in a 2–1 victory over the Dallas Stars, stopping 30 of 31 shots. On February 25 he recorded his first shutout as a member of the Blackhawks in a 2–0 win over the Columbus Blue Jackets.

Entering his third season with the Blackhawks in 2021–22 and with the acquisition of starting goaltender Marc-André Fleury, Subban was placed on waivers and reassigned by Chicago to AHL affiliate, the Rockford IceHogs. With three goaltenders on the roster competing for ice time with the IceHogs, Subban featured in only five games, collecting two wins, through the opening two months of the season.

==== Buffalo Sabres ====
On December 2, 2021, Subban was traded by the Blackhawks to the Buffalo Sabres in exchange for future considerations. He was acquired after regular goaltenders Craig Anderson and Dustin Tokarski were unavailable to injury and illness. He made his debut with the Sabres, allowing six goals on 25 shots before he was pulled in the third period of a 6–2 defeat by the Carolina Hurricanes on December 4. On January 12, 2022, Subban made a relief appearance against the Tampa Bay Lightning in place of the injured Ukko-Pekka Luukkonen. Subban collided with Lightning forward Patrick Maroon late in the second period. He played out the remainder of the contest despite the collision. It was later revealed Subban suffered an upper-body injury. He underwent surgery, and Sabres' head coach Don Granato speculated Subban would miss the remainder of the season. On April 29, while recovering from season-ending surgery, Subban sang "The Star-Spangled Banner" during a Sabres home game against the Chicago Blackhawks.

In the 2022 off-season, he re-signed with the Sabres to a one-year, two-way contract on July 12. Due to another logjam of goaltenders in Buffalo's system, Subban again ended up in the AHL with the Sabres' affiliate Rochester Americans for the 2022–23 season. He became their starter and appeared in 39 games, with a record of 20–14–5 with a .903 save percentage. The Americans made the 2023 Calder Cup playoffs and helped the team reach the Eastern Conference finals where they were defeated by the Hershey Bears. Subban appeared in 14 playoff games, posting a .914 save percentage, and registered the Americans first playoff shutout since 2014.

==== St. Louis Blues ====
On July 1, 2023, Subban as a free agent signed a one-year, two-way contract with the St. Louis Blues for the 2023–24 season. He was assigned to the Blues' AHL affiliate, the Springfield Thunderbirds, for the 2023–24 season. In 31 games with Springfield, he had a record of 11–14–4 and a save percentage of .907.

==== Columbus Blue Jackets and AHL ====
On March 8, 2024, the Blues traded Subban to the Columbus Blue Jackets in exchange for future considerations and immediately assigned to their AHL affiliate, the Cleveland Monsters. He played in four games for Cleveland, with a record of 1–0–0 and a save percentage of .853. He was recalled by Columbus on an emergency basis on April 5 after Daniil Tarasov was injured. He made his Blue Jackets debut on April 7 and stopped 32 of 35 shots in a 3–0 loss to the Carolina Hurricanes. Cleveland made the 2024 Calder Cup playoffs and Subban appeared in two games.

As a free agent from the Blue Jackets, Subban remained un-signed over the summer. Approaching the 2024–25 season, Subban was signed to a professional tryout (PTO) with the Grand Rapids Griffins of the AHL, primary affiliate to the Detroit Red Wings, on October 7, 2024. He was later released by the Griffins without playing for the club on October 26, 2024. On October 28, he signed a one-year AHL contract with the Belleville Senators, primary affiliate of the NHL's Ottawa Senators. In 24 games with Belleville he had a record of 11–6–4, with a GAA of 3.13 and a save percentage of 0.883.

==== Europe ====
On November 9, 2025, it was announced that Subban had signed with HC Dynamo Pardubice of the Czech Extraliga.

== International play ==
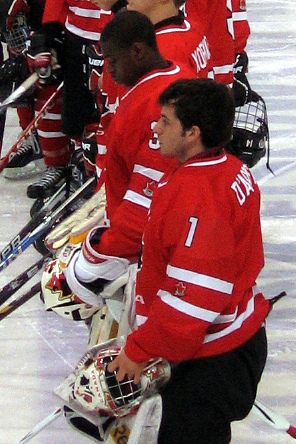
Subban competed with the Canadian national junior team in the 2013 World Junior Ice Hockey Championships.

He was goaltender for Team Canada in the 2013 World Junior Championships in Ufa, Russia. He appeared in six games, with four wins. Canada finished in fourth place at the tournament.

== Activism ==
On August 1, 2020, after the murder of George Floyd, Subban supported Matt Dumba when he became the first NHL player to kneel during the U.S. national anthem. Dumba, a Filipino-Canadian member of the Hockey Diversity Alliance, was a member of the Minnesota Wild but he was not playing that night. Two Black players from the teams who were playing placed their hands on his shoulders while he knelt: Subban of the Chicago Blackhawks and Darnell Nurse of the Edmonton Oilers. The three of them remained in this position during both the American and Canadian national anthems. Dumba then gave a speech about racism while the screens in the rink displayed the messaged "END RACISM."

== Career statistics ==
=== Regular season and playoffs ===
			Regular season									Playoffs
Season	Team	League	GP	W	L	T/OT	MIN	GA	SO	GAA	SV%	GP	W	L	MIN	GA	SO	GAA	SV%
2009–10	Toronto Jr. Canadiens	OJHL	2	0	1	0	71	4	0	3.39	.882	—	—	—	—	—	—	—	—
2009–10	Belleville Bulls	OHL	1	0	0	0	13	0	0	0.00	1.000	—	—	—	—	—	—	—	—
2010–11	Belleville Bulls	OHL	32	10	17	2	1785	94	0	3.16	.900	3	0	3	178	6	0	2.02	.933
2011–12	Belleville Bulls	OHL	39	25	14	0	2258	94	3	2.50	.923	6	2	4	369	18	0	2.93	.917
2012–13	Belleville Bulls	OHL	46	29	11	4	2695	96	5	2.14	.934	17	11	6	1021	34	3	2.00	.933
2013–14	Providence Bruins	AHL	33	15	10	5	1920	74	1	2.31	.920	6	2	2	244	12	0	2.96	.888
2014–15	Providence Bruins	AHL	35	16	13	4	2017	82	3	2.44	.921	2	1	1	160	3	0	1.12	.953
2014–15	Boston Bruins	NHL	1	0	1	0	31	3	0	5.81	.500	—	—	—	—	—	—	—	—
2015–16	Providence Bruins	AHL	27	14	8	5	1635	67	1	2.46	.911	—	—	—	—	—	—	—	—
2016–17	Providence Bruins	AHL	32	11	14	5	1789	72	1	2.41	.917	3	0	2	113	4	0	2.12	.937
2016–17	Boston Bruins	NHL	1	0	1	0	31	3	0	5.81	.813	—	—	—	—	—	—	—	—
2017–18	Vegas Golden Knights	NHL	22	13	4	2	1230	55	0	2.68	.910	—	—	—	—	—	—	—	—
2018–19	Vegas Golden Knights	NHL	21	8	10	2	1227	60	1	2.93	.902	—	—	—	—	—	—	—	—
2019–20	Vegas Golden Knights	NHL	20	9	7	3	1134	60	0	3.18	.890	—	—	—	—	—	—	—	—
2019–20	Chicago Blackhawks	NHL	1	0	0	0	1	0	0	0.00	0	—	—	—	—	—	—	—	—
2020–21	Chicago Blackhawks	NHL	16	6	8	1	882	47	2	3.20	.900	—	—	—	—	—	—	—	—
2021–22	Rockford IceHogs	AHL	5	2	2	1	302	17	0	3.38	.893	—	—	—	—	—	—	—	—
2021–22	Buffalo Sabres	NHL	4	0	2	1	211	17	0	4.85	.871	—	—	—	—	—	—	—	—
2022–23	Rochester Americans	AHL	39	20	14	5	2347	115	2	2.94	.903	14	8	6	843	36	1	2.56	.916
2023–24	Springfield Thunderbirds	AHL	31	11	14	4	1755	86	0	2.94	.907	—	—	—	—	—	—	—	—
2023–24	Cleveland Monsters	AHL	4	0	3	0	224	17	0	4.56	.853	2	1	0	79	4	0	3.04	.879
2023–24	Columbus Blue Jackets	NHL	1	0	1	0	60	3	0	3.00	.914	—	—	—	—	—	—	—	—
2024–25	Belleville Senators	AHL	24	11	6	5	1322	69	0	3.13	.883	—	—	—	—	—	—	—	—
NHL totals			87	36	34	9	4,805	248	3	3.10	.898	—	—	—	—	—	—	—	—

=== International ===
Year	Team	Event	Result	GP	W	L	OTL	MIN	GA	SO	GAA	SV%
2013	Canada	WJC	4th	6	4	2	0	326	15	0	2.76	.901
Junior totals				6	4	2	0	326	15	0	2.76	.901

== Awards and honours ==
- 2010–11 – OHL First All-Rookie Team
- 2012–13 – OHL Third All-Star Team

== See also ==
- Black players in ice hockey

Awards and achievements
Preceded by Dougie Hamilton	Boston Bruins first-round draft pick 2012	Succeeded by David Pastrňák
