= 2010 AHL All-Star Game =

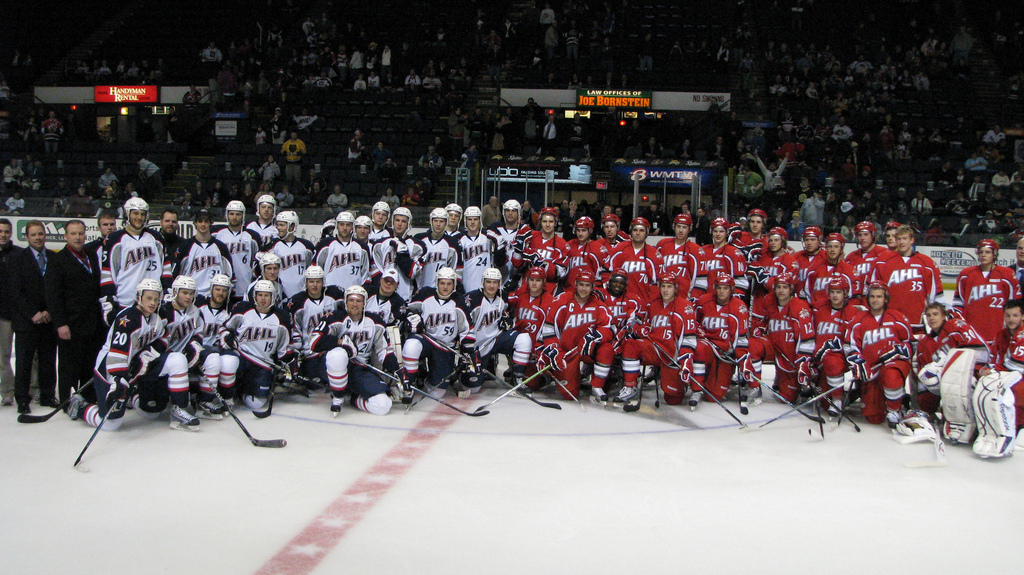
The 2010 participants

The 2010 American Hockey League All-Star Game was held on January 18–19, 2010 at Cumberland County Civic Center, in Portland, Maine. The American Hockey League (AHL) is a professional ice hockey league based in the United States and Canada that serves as the primary developmental league for the National Hockey League (NHL).

For this All-Star game, the Canadian AHL All-Stars completed a sweep of the 2010 Time Warner Cable AHL All-Star Classic with a come-from-behind 10-9 shootout win over PlanetUSA. The AHL All-Star game is made up of the top AHL prospects in the minor league.

== Game summary ==
The game started off with a great amount of intensity starting in the first minute of the game where the Canadian AHL All-Stars scored their first goal 47 seconds into the game. 25 Seconds after Team Canada scored Planet USA came back and tied the game 1-1.

The Canadians were down by four goals when the Worcester Sharks' Logan Couture began the comeback at 7:48 of the third period. The Binghamton Senators' Ryan Keller collected his second goal of the night at 12:30 and Ellerby captured his only point of the night with an assist on Dustin Jeffrey's goal at 14:41 of the final frame to help put the Canadians within one goal and cut the deficit to 9-8. Then, with their goaltender pulled for an extra attacker, the Canadian squad evened the score when reigning league MVP Alexandre Giroux of the Hershey Bears banged home a shot with 18.0 seconds remaining.
