= Toledo Blue Stockings all-time roster =

List of baseball players

The Toledo Blue Stockings were a professional baseball team based in Toledo, Ohio, that played in the American Association for one season in 1884. The franchise used League Park and Tri-State Fair Grounds as their home fields. During their only season in existence, the team finished eighth in the AA with a record of 46-58.

== Players ==
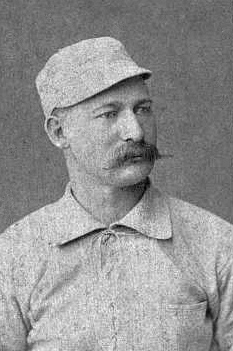
Second baseman Sam Barkley led the Blue Stockings in several offensive categories.

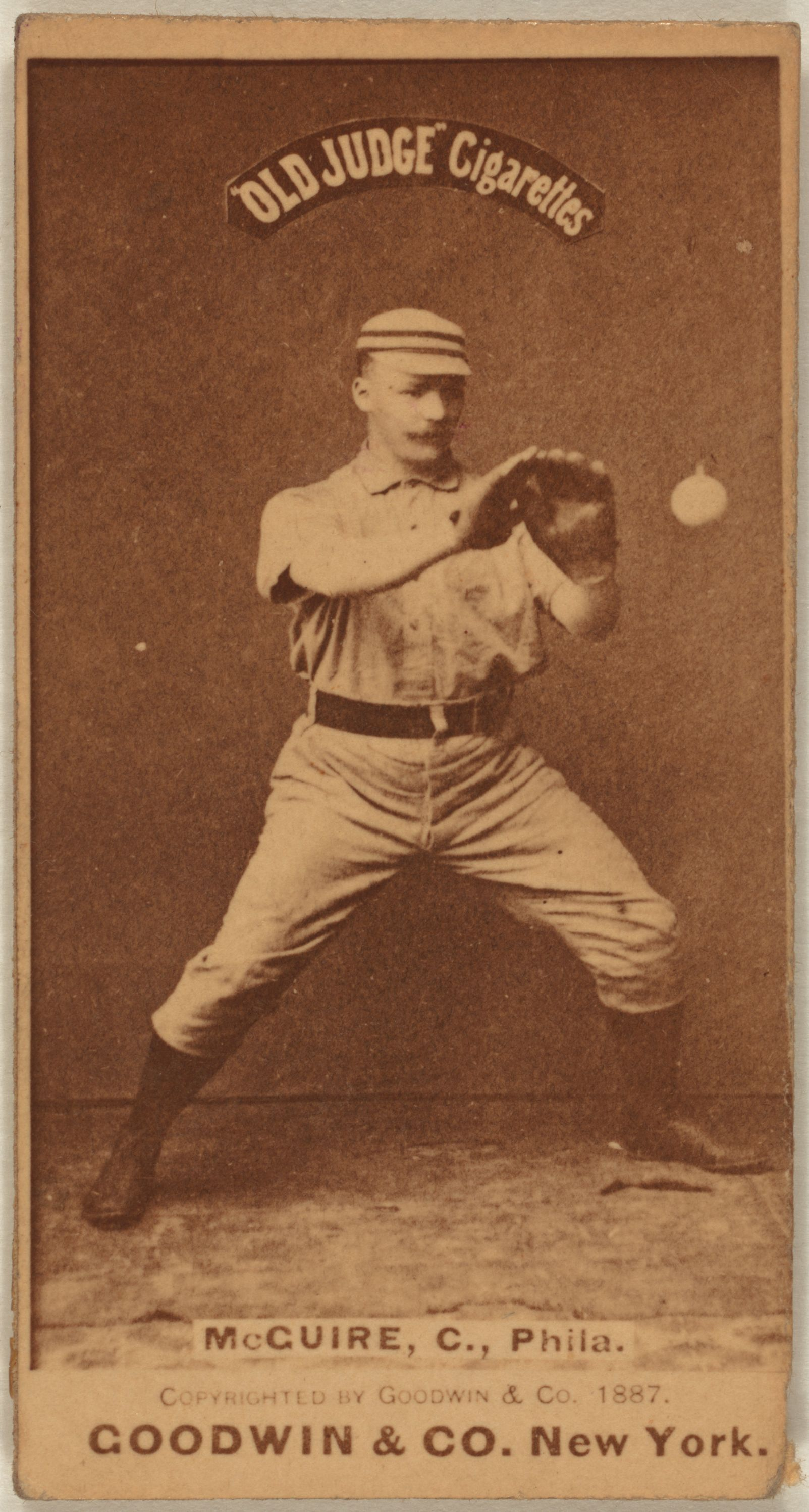
Catcher Deacon McGuire started his major league career with the Blue Stockings.

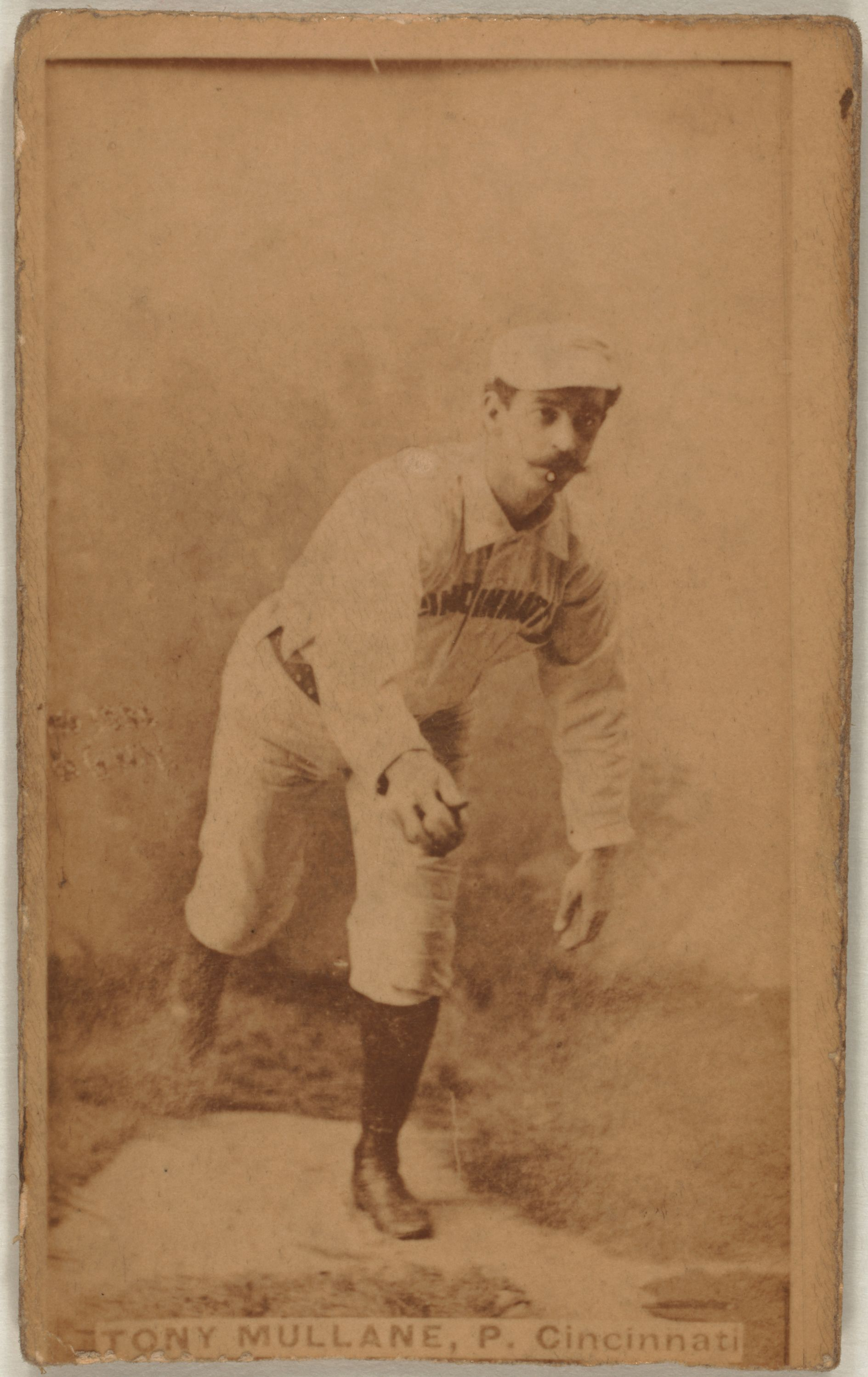
Tony Mullane was the Blue Stockings' primary pitcher and won 36 games.

Key to symbols in player table
§	Player was a player-manager
†	Inducted into the National Baseball Hall of Fame and Museum

Players who have played for the Toledo Blue Stockings, primary position played, and season(s) played for franchise
Player	Position(s)	Season(s)	Notes	Ref
Tug Arundel	Catcher	1884		
Sam Barkley	Second baseman	1884	In his first major league season, Barkley led the Blue Stockings in several hitting categories, including batting average and runs scored.	
Ed Brown	Third baseman	1884		
Sim Bullas	Catcher	1884		
Ed Kent	Pitcher	1884		
Chappy Lane	First baseman	1884		
Deacon McGuire	Catcher	1884	McGuire started his major league career, which lasted until 1912, with the Blue Stockings.	
Trick McSorley	First baseman	1884		
George Meister	Third baseman	1884		
Ed Miller	Left fielder	1884		
Joe Miller	Shortstop	1884		
Joe Moffet	First baseman	1884		
Charlie Morton^{§}	Third baseman / Left fielder	1884	Morton was the team's manager and also batted .162 in 32 games.	
Tony Mullane	Pitcher	1884	Mullane pitched over half of the team's innings, had a win–loss record of 36-26, and eventually finished his major league career with 284 victories.	
Hank O'Day^{†}	Pitcher	1884	In his first major league season, O'Day pitched the second-most innings for the Blue Stockings and went 9-28.	
Frank Olin	Left fielder	1884		
Tom Poorman	Right fielder	1884		
John Tilley	Left fielder	1884		
Fleet Walker	Catcher	1884	In his only major league season, Walker batted .263 in 42 games for the Blue Stockings.	
Welday Walker	Left fielder	1884		
Curt Welch	Center fielder	1884	Welch led the Blue Stockings with 109 games played in his first major league season.	
