= Black athletes =

Black athletes may refer to:

- 1968 Olympics Black Power salute
- Black athletic superiority
- Black participation in college basketball
- Black players in professional American football
- Black players in ice hockey
- Black players in the NBA
- Forty Million Dollar Slaves, a book by William C. Rhoden
