= List of African-American sports firsts =

African Americans are a demographic minority in the United States. The first achievements by African Americans in various fields historically marked footholds, often leading to more widespread cultural change. The shorthand phrase for this is "breaking the color barrier".

The world of sports generally is invoked in the frequently cited example of Jackie Robinson, who became the first African American of the modern era to become a Major League Baseball player in 1947, after 60 years of segregated Negro leagues.

== 19th century ==
=== 1879 ===
- First African American to play major league baseball: Possibly William Edward White; he played as a substitute in one professional baseball game for the Providence Grays of the National League, on June 21, 1879. Work by the Society for American Baseball Research (SABR) suggests that he may have been the first African-American to play major league baseball, predating the longer careers of Moses Fleetwood Walker and his brother Weldy Walker by five years; and Jackie Robinson by 68 years.

=== 1884 ===
- First African American to play professional baseball at the major-league level: Possibly Moses Fleetwood Walker, but see also William Edward White in 1879.

=== 1896 ===
- First African American to compete in the U.S. Open Golf Championship: John Shippen. He was also the first American golf professional.

=== 1899 ===
- First African American to win a gold medal at the Track Cycling World Championships: Major Taylor (Sprint). This also made him the first African American to achieve world championship in any sport.

== 20th century ==
=== 1902 ===
- First African American professional basketball player: Harry Lew (New England Professional Basketball League) (See also: 1950)
- First African-American professional American football player: Charles Follis
- First African American boxing champion: Joe Gans, a lightweight

=== 1904 ===
- First African American to participate in the Olympic Games, and first to win a medal: George Poage (two bronze medals)

=== 1908 ===
- First African American heavyweight boxing champion: Jack Johnson
- First African American Olympic gold medal winner: John Taylor (track and field medley relay team). (See also: DeHart Hubbard, 1924)

=== 1910s ===
==== 1916 ====
- First African American football player to play in a Rose Bowl game: Fritz Pollard, Brown University

==== 1917 ====
- First African American woman to win a major sports title: Lucy Diggs Slowe, American Tennis Association

=== 1920s ===
==== 1920 ====
- First African American NFL football players: Fritz Pollard (Akron Pros) and Bobby Marshall (Rock Island Independents)

==== 1921 ====
- First African American NFL football coach: Fritz Pollard, co-head coach, Akron Pros, while continuing to play running back

==== 1924 ====
- First African American to win individual Olympic gold medal: DeHart Hubbard (Long jump, 1924 Summer Olympics). (See also: John Taylor, 1908)

==== 1929 ====
- First African American sportscaster: Sherman "Jocko" Maxwell (WNJR, Newark, New Jersey)

=== 1930s ===
==== 1936 ====
- First African-American professional baseball player in Japan: Jimmy Bonner

=== 1940s ===
==== 1946 ====
- First African American to sign a contract with an NFL team in the modern (post-World War II) era: Kenny Washington

==== 1947 ====
- First African American Major League Baseball player of the modern era: Jackie Robinson (Brooklyn Dodgers). (See also: Moses Fleetwood Walker, 1884)
- First African-American Major League Baseball player in the American League: Larry Doby (Cleveland Indians).
- First African American consensus college All-American basketball player: Don Barksdale

==== 1948 ====
- First African American to play in a post-season collegiate tournament: Clarence Walker, for Indiana State in the 1948 NAIA Tournament.
- First African American woman to win an Olympic gold medal: Alice Coachman
- First African American on an Olympic basketball team and first African-American Olympic gold medal basketball winner: Don Barksdale, in the 1948 Summer Olympics
- First African American to design and construct a professional golf course: Bill Powell

==== 1949 ====
- First African American to win an MVP award in Major League Baseball: Jackie Robinson (Brooklyn Dodgers, National League) (See also: Elston Howard, 1963)

=== 1950s ===
==== 1950 ====
- First African American woman to compete on the world tennis tour: Althea Gibson
- First African American NBA basketball players: Nat "Sweetwater" Clifton (New York Knicks), Chuck Cooper (Boston Celtics), and Earl Lloyd (Washington Capitols). Harold Hunter was the first to sign an NBA contract, with the Washington Capitols on April 26, 1950. He was released from it during training camp and did not play professionally. (Note: Clifton was the first to sign an NBA contract and subsequently play, Cooper was the first to be drafted by an NBA team, and Lloyd was the first to play in an NBA regular-season game because his team's opening game was one day before the others.) (See also: 1902)

==== 1951 ====
- First African American named to the College Football Hall of Fame: Duke Slater, University of Iowa (1918–1921)
- First African American quarterback to become a regular starter for a professional football team: Bernie Custis (Hamilton Tiger-Cats)

==== 1952 ====
- First African American sportswoman to endorse an international consumer product: Alice Coachman for Coca-Cola

==== 1953 ====
- First African American basketball player to play in the NBA All-Star Game: Don Barksdale in the 1953 NBA All-Star Game
- First African American quarterback to play in the National Football League during the modern (post-World War II) era: Willie Thrower (Chicago Bears)

==== 1955 ====
- First African Americans to play in the Orange Bowl: Charles Bryant and Jon McWilliams (University of Nebraska)

==== 1956 ====
- First African American to break the color barrier in the Sugar Bowl: Bobby Grier, (Pittsburgh Panthers in the 1956 Sugar Bowl)
- First African American Wimbledon tennis champion: Althea Gibson (doubles, with Englishwoman Angela Buxton); also first African American to win a Grand Slam event (French Open). (See also: Arthur Ashe, 1968; Serena Williams, 2003)
- First African American to win the Cy Young Award as the top pitcher in Major League Baseball, in the award's inaugural year: Don Newcombe (Brooklyn Dodgers)

==== 1957 ====
- First African American NFL assistant coach (receivers coach) of the modern era: Lowell Perry (Pittsburgh Steelers) (See also: 1966)

=== 1960s ===
==== 1961 ====
- First African American to win the Heisman Trophy: Ernie Davis (Syracuse University)
- First African American to join the PGA Tour: Charlie Sifford

==== 1962 ====
- First African American to be inducted into the Baseball Hall of Fame: Jackie Robinson (See also: Satchel Paige, 1971)
- First African-American coach in Major League Baseball: John Jordan "Buck" O'Neil (Chicago Cubs)

==== 1963 ====
- First African American to be named American League MVP: Elston Howard (New York Yankees) (See also: Jackie Robinson, 1949)
- First African Americans inducted to the Basketball Hall of Fame: New York Renaissance, inducted as a team. (See also: Bob Douglas, 1972; Bill Russell, 1975; Clarence Gaines, 1982)
- First African American to win a NASCAR Grand National event: Wendell Scott. See also 2015.

==== 1964 ====
- First African-American baseball player to be named the Major League Baseball World Series MVP: Bob Gibson, St. Louis Cardinals
- First African-American to join the Ladies Professional Golf Association: Althea Gibson
- First African-American baseball player to be named the captain of a Major League Baseball team: Willie Mays, San Francisco Giants

==== 1966 ====
- First African-American coach in the National Basketball Association: Bill Russell (Boston Celtics)
- First African-American Major League Baseball umpire: Emmett Ashford
- First African-American NFL broadcaster: Lowell Perry (CBS, on Pittsburgh Steelers games) (See also: 1957)
- First team with 5 African American starters to win the NCAA basketball tournament: 1965–66 Texas Western Miners basketball team

==== 1967 ====
- First African American to win a PGA Tour event: Charlie Sifford (1967 Greater Hartford Open Invitational)
- First African American to be inducted into the Pro Football Hall of Fame: Emlen Tunnell

==== 1968 ====
- First African-American man to win a Grand Slam tennis event: Arthur Ashe (US Open) (See also: Althea Gibson, 1956; Serena Williams, 2003)
- First African American to start at quarterback in the modern era of professional football: Marlin Briscoe (Denver Broncos, AFL)
- First African-American coach to win NBA Championship: Bill Russell

=== 1970s ===
==== 1970 ====
- First African-American basketball player to win the NBA All Star MVP, the NBA Finals MVP, and the NBA MVP all in the same season: Willis Reed (New York Knicks)
- First African-American NCAA Division I basketball coach: Will Robinson (Illinois State University) (Note: At the time, the NCAA had not yet adopted its three-division system. Illinois State was in the NCAA University Division, which became Division I in 1973. The NCAA retroactively considers University Division members to have been Division I members.)
- First African American to initiate the concept of free agency. He refused to accept a trade following the 1969 season, ultimately appealing his case to the U.S. Supreme Court. The trend of free agency expanded across the entire landscape of professional sports for all races and all cultures: Curt Flood (St. Louis Cardinals) (Note: Although Flood's legal challenge was unsuccessful, it brought about additional solidarity among players as they fought against baseball's reserve clause and sought free agency.)

==== 1972 ====
- First African-American National Basketball Association general manager: Wayne Embry
- First African American inducted to the Basketball Hall of Fame: Team-owner and coach Bob Douglas, in the category of "contributor" (See also: New York Renaissance, 1963; player Bill Russell, 1975; coach Clarence Gaines, 1982)

==== 1974 ====
- First African-American NBA Coach of the Year: Ray Scott (Detroit Pistons)

==== 1975 ====
- First African American inducted to the Basketball Hall of Fame as a player: Bill Russell (See also: Harlem Renaissance, 1963; Bob Douglas, 1972; Clarence Gaines, 1982)
- First African-American manager in Major League Baseball: Frank Robinson (Cleveland Indians)
- First African American to play in a men's major golf championship: Lee Elder (The Masters)
- First African American to be named Super Bowl MVP in NFL: Franco Harris (Pittsburgh Steelers). Of mixed heritage, Harris was also first Italian American to win the award.

==== 1977 ====
- First African-American Major League Baseball general manager: Bill Lucas (Atlanta Braves)

==== 1979 ====
- First African-American head football coach in Division I-A: Willie Jeffries (Wichita State)
- First African-American to play professional basketball behind the Iron Curtain: Kent Washington in January 1979 for KS Start Lublin, Poland.

=== 1980s ===
==== 1981 ====
- First African American to play in the NHL: Val James (Buffalo Sabres) (Note: The NHL had fielded black players for more than 20 years, with the first being Willie O'Ree in 1958, but all previous black players were Black Canadians and not African Americans. In 1996, Mike Grier (Edmonton Oilers) became the first to have been both born and exclusively trained in the U.S., per Allen, Kevin (January 14, 2008). "Willie O'Ree still blazing way in NHL 50 years later". USA Today. Archived from the original on October 26, 2012.)

==== 1982 ====
- First African American inducted to the Basketball Hall of Fame as a coach: Clarence Gaines (See also: New York Renaissance, 1963; Bob Douglas, 1972; Bill Russell, 1975)

==== 1984 ====
- First African-American coach to win the NCAA Men's Division I Basketball Championship: John Thompson (Georgetown)

==== 1986 ====
- First African-American Formula One racecar driver: Willy T. Ribbs (Note: Lewis Hamilton became the first black Formula One racer in 2006, but he is a British citizen of Grenadan ancestry, and not an African American. Ribbs did not compete in a race, but drove a Formula One car professionally in January 1986 as a tester for the Brabham–BMW at Estoril, Portugal.) (See also: Ribbs, 1991)

==== 1987 ====
- First African American man to sail around the world solo: Teddy Seymour (See also: 1992)

==== 1988 ====
- First African-American NFL referee: Johnny Grier
- First African American to win a medal at the Winter Olympics (a bronze in figure skating): Debi Thomas
- First African-American quarterback to start (and win) in the Super Bowl: Doug Williams

==== 1989 ====
- First African-American NFL head coach of the modern era: Art Shell, Los Angeles Raiders

=== 1990s ===
==== 1991 ====
- First African American to qualify for the Indianapolis 500 auto race: Willy T. Ribbs (See also: Ribbs, 1986)

==== 1992 ====
- First African-American Major League Baseball manager to reach (and win) the World Series: Cito Gaston (Toronto Blue Jays) 1992 World Series
- First African American to sail solo around the world following the Age of Sail route around the southern tips of South America (Cape Horn) and Africa (Cape of Good Hope), avoiding the Panama and Suez Canals: Bill Pinkney (See also: 1987)

==== 1993 ====
- First African-American to serve as home plate umpire for World Series game: Charlie Williams for Game 4 of the 1993 World Series

==== 1994 ====
- First African American to win the United States Amateur Championship: Tiger Woods (Note: Woods' mixed ancestry — 1/4 Chinese, 1/4 Thai, 1/4 African-American, 1/8 white, and 1/8 Native American — also makes him the first Asian American to achieve this feat. He is also the first of only four golfers of primarily non-European descent to win a men's major, with the others being Vijay Singh (an Indian Fijian), Michael Campbell (a Māori from New Zealand), and Y.E. Yang (South Korean).)

==== 1996 ====
- First African-American MLB general manager to win the World Series: Bob Watson (New York Yankees), 1996 World Series

==== 1997 ====
- First African American to win a men's major golf championship: Tiger Woods (The Masters)
- First African-American UFC champion: Maurice Smith

==== 1998 ====
- First African American to play in the Presidents Cup: Tiger Woods

== 21st century ==
=== 2002 ===
- First African-American Winter Olympic gold medal winner: Vonetta Flowers (two-woman bobsleigh). (See also: Shani Davis, 2006)
- First African American to become majority owner of a U.S. major sports league team: Robert L. Johnson (Charlotte Bobcats, NBA) (Note: Announced as Bobcats owner in December 2002, although team did not begin play until 2004.) (see also 2001)
- First African American to hold the #1 rank in tennis: Venus Williams
- First African American to hold the year-end #1 rank in tennis: Serena Williams
- First African American to be named year-end world champion by the International Tennis Federation: Serena Williams
- First African-American Arena Football League head coach to win ArenaBowl: Darren Arbet (San Jose SaberCats), ArenaBowl XVI
- First African-American general manager in the National Football League: Ozzie Newsome (Baltimore Ravens)

=== 2003 ===
- First African American to win a Career Grand Slam in tennis: Serena Williams (See also: Althea Gibson, 1956; Arthur Ashe, 1968)

=== 2004 ===
- First African-American NBA general manager to win the NBA Finals: Joe Dumars (Detroit Pistons), 2004 NBA Finals
- First African-American Canadian Football League head coach to reach (and win) the Grey Cup: Pinball Clemons (Toronto Argonauts), 92nd Grey Cup
- First African-American inducted into the World Golf Hall of Fame: Charlie Sifford
- First African-American to play for USA Softball during the Olympics: Natasha Watley

=== 2006 ===
- First African-American individual Winter Olympic gold medal winner: Shani Davis (men's 1,000 meter speed skating) (See also: Vonetta Flowers, 2002)

=== 2007 ===
- First African-American NFL head coaches to reach the Super Bowl: Lovie Smith and Tony Dungy, Super Bowl XLI (Note: Smith and Dungy both reached this milestone on the same day, although Smith was technically the first due solely to scheduling. The NFC and AFC Championship Games are always held on the same day. In the playoffs that followed the 2006 NFL season, the NFC game was played first.)
- First African-American NFL head coach to win the Super Bowl: Tony Dungy (Indianapolis Colts), Super Bowl XLI

=== 2008 ===
- First African American to referee a Super Bowl game: Mike Carey (Super Bowl XLII)
- First African-American NFL general manager to win the Super Bowl: Jerry Reese (New York Giants), Super Bowl XLII

=== 2009 ===
- First African-American doubles team to be named year-end world champion by the International Tennis Federation: Serena and Venus Williams

=== 2010s ===
==== 2010 ====
- First African-American to win the Stanley Cup: Dustin Byfuglien with the Chicago Blackhawks

==== 2012 ====
- First African-American gymnast to win the women's artistic individual all-around at the Olympic Games: Gabby Douglas

==== 2013 ====
- First African American gymnast to win the women's artistic individual all-around at the World Artistic Gymnastics Championships: Simone Biles

==== 2014 ====
- First African-American player named to the USA Curtis Cup Team: Mariah Stackhouse

==== 2015 ====
- First African American to be inducted into the NASCAR Hall of Fame: Wendell Scott
- First African-American commissioner of a major North American sports league: Jeffrey Orridge, Canadian Football League

==== 2018 ====
- First African-American man to play for the United States men's national ice hockey team (Team USA) in the Olympic Games: Jordan Greenway

==== 2020 ====
- First African-American president of an NFL team: Jason Wright with the Washington Football Team
- First African-American NHL play-by-play broadcaster: Everett Fitzhugh with Seattle Kraken
- First African-American NHL Assistant General Manager: Brett Petersen with Florida Panthers

==== 2021 ====
- First full-time female African-American NFL coach: Jennifer King with the Washington Football Team
- First female African-American NFL referee: Maia Chaka

==== 2022 ====
- First African-American manager to win 2000 MLB games: Dusty Baker
- First African-American general manager of an NHL team: Mike Grier with San Jose Sharks

==== 2026 ====
- First African-American woman to play for the United States women's national ice hockey team (Team USA) in the Olympic Games, and their first Black gold medalist: Laila Edwards

== See also ==
- Race and sports in the United States
- Race and ethnicity in the NBA
- Race and ethnicity in the NHL
- African Americans in sports
- List of sports desegregation firsts
- List of managers of Asian heritage in sports leagues in the United States and Canada
