= Lapchick =

Lapchick is a surname. Notable people with the surname include:

- Joe Lapchick (1900–1970), American basketball player
- Richard Lapchick, American academic and activist
