= Baseball color line =

Racial exclusion policy in Major and Minor League Baseball until 1947

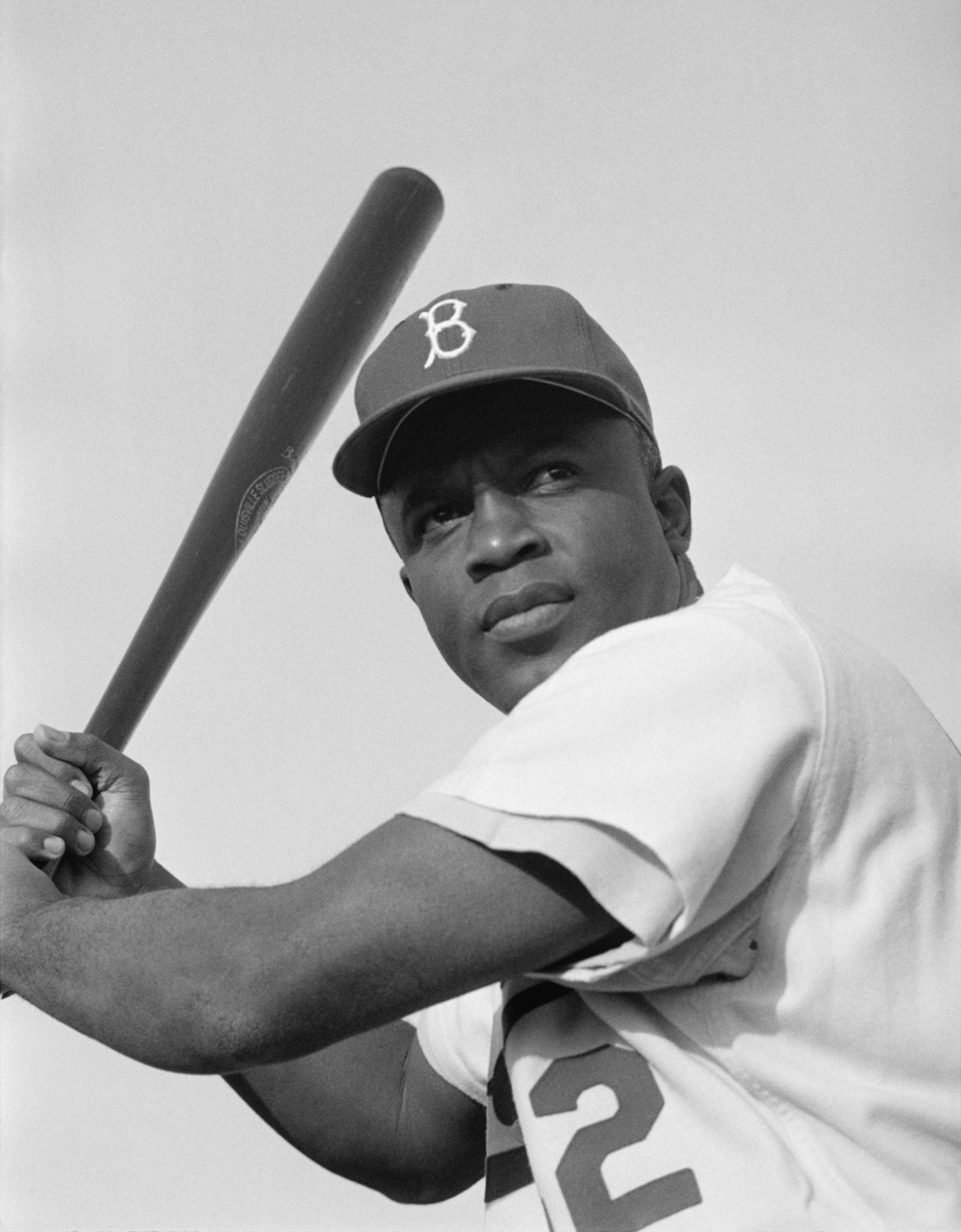
Jackie Robinson broke baseball's color barrier on April 15, 1947.

The color line, also known as the color barrier, in American baseball excluded African American players from Major League Baseball and its affiliated Minor Leagues until 1947 (with a few notable exceptions in the 19th century before the line was firmly established). Racial segregation in professional baseball was sometimes called a gentlemen's agreement, meaning a tacit understanding, as there was no written policy at the highest level of organized baseball, the major leagues. A high minor league's vote in 1887 against allowing new contracts with black players within its league sent a powerful signal that eventually led to the disappearance of black people from the sport's other minor leagues later that century, including the low minors.

After the line was in virtually full effect in the early 20th century, many black baseball clubs were established, especially from the 1920s to the 1940s when there were several Negro leagues. During this period, American Indians and native Hawaiians, including Prince Oana, were able to play in the Major Leagues. The color line was broken for good when Jackie Robinson signed with the Brooklyn Dodgers organization for the 1946 season. In 1947, both Robinson in the National League and Larry Doby with the American League's Cleveland Indians appeared in games for their teams.

== Origins ==
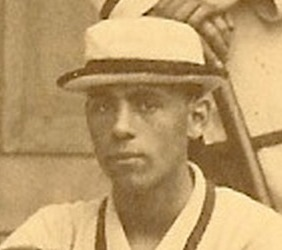
William Edward White

Before the 1860s Civil War, black players participated in the highest levels of baseball. During the war, baseball rose to prominence as a way to bring soldiers from various regions of the country together. In the aftermath of the war, baseball became a tool for national reconciliation; due to the racial issues involved in the war, baseball's unifying potential was mainly pursued among white Americans.

The formal beginning of segregation followed the baseball season of 1867. On October 16, the Pennsylvania State Convention of Baseball in Harrisburg denied admission to the "colored" Pythian Baseball Club. Major League Baseball's National League, founded in 1876, had no black players in the 19th century, except for a recently discovered one, William Edward White, who played in a single game in 1879 and who apparently passed as white. The National League and the other main major league of the day, the American Association, had no written rules against having black players. In 1884, the American Association had two black players, Moses Fleetwood Walker and, for a few months of the season, his brother Weldy Walker, both of whom played for the Toledo Blue Stockings.

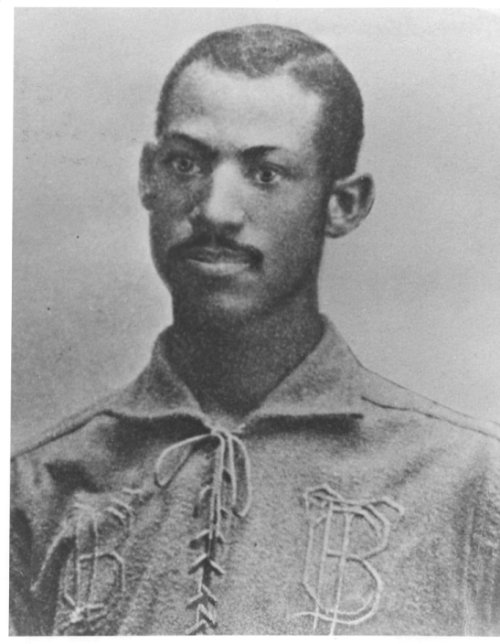
Moses Fleetwood Walker of the Toledo Blue Stockings, c. 1884

The year before, in 1883, prominent National League player Cap Anson had threatened to have his Chicago team sit out an exhibition game at then-minor league Toledo if Toledo's Fleetwood Walker played. Anson backed down, but not before uttering the word nigger on the field and vowing that his team would not play in such a game again. In 1884, the Chicago club made a successful threat months in advance of another exhibition game at Toledo, to have Fleet Walker sit out. In 1887, Anson made a successful threat by telegram before an exhibition game against the Newark Little Giants of the International League that it must not play its two black players, Fleet Walker and pitcher George Stovey. The influence of players such as Anson and the general racism in society led to segregation efforts in professional baseball.

On July 14, 1887, the high-minor International League voted to ban the signing of new contracts with black players. By a 6-to-4 vote, the league's entirely white teams voted in favor and those with at least one black player voted in the negative. The Binghamton (New York) team, which had just released its two black players, voted with the majority. Right after the vote, the sports weekly Sporting Life stated, "Several representatives declared that many of the best players in the league are anxious to leave on account of the colored element, and the board finally directed Secretary [C.D.] White to approve of no more contracts with colored men." On the afternoon of the International League vote, Anson's Chicago team played the game in Newark alluded to above, with Stovey and the apparently injured Walker sitting out. Anson biographer Howard W. Rosenberg, concluded that, "A fairer argument is that rather than being an architect [of segregation in professional baseball, as the late baseball racism historian Jules Tygiel termed Anson in his 1983 Baseball's Great Experiment: Jackie Robinson and His Legacy], that he was a reinforcer of it, including in the National League – and that he had no demonstrable influence on changing the course of events apart from his team's exhibition-game schedule."

The year 1887 was also the high point of achievement of black players in the high minor leagues, and each National League team that year except for Chicago played exhibition games against teams with black players, including against Newark and other International League teams. Some of Anson's notoriety stems from a 1907 book on early black players in baseball by black minor league player and later black semi-professional team manager Sol White, who was elected to the Hall of Fame in 2006. White claimed that, "Were it not for this same man Anson, there would have been a colored player in the National League in 1887."

After the 1887 season, the International League retained just two black players for the 1888 season, both of whom were under contracts signed before the 1887 vote, Frank Grant of the Buffalo Bisons and Moses Fleetwood Walker of the Syracuse franchise, with Walker staying in the league for most of 1889. In September 1887, eight members of the St. Louis Browns of the then-major American Association (who would ultimately change their nickname to the current St. Louis Cardinals) staged a mutiny during a road trip, refusing to play a game against the New York Cuban Giants, the first all-black professional baseball club, and citing both racial and practical reasons: that the players were banged up and wanted to rest so as to not lose their hold on first place. At the time, the St. Louis team was in Philadelphia, and a story that ran in the Philadelphia Times stated that "for the first time in the history of base ball the color line has been drawn." Black players were gone from the high minors after 1889 and a trickle of them were left in the minor leagues within a decade. Besides White's single game in 1879, the only black players in major league baseball for around 75 years were Fleet Walker and his brother Weldy, both in 1884 with Toledo. A big change would take place starting in 1946, when Jackie Robinson played for the Montreal Royals in the International League.

== Covert efforts at integration ==
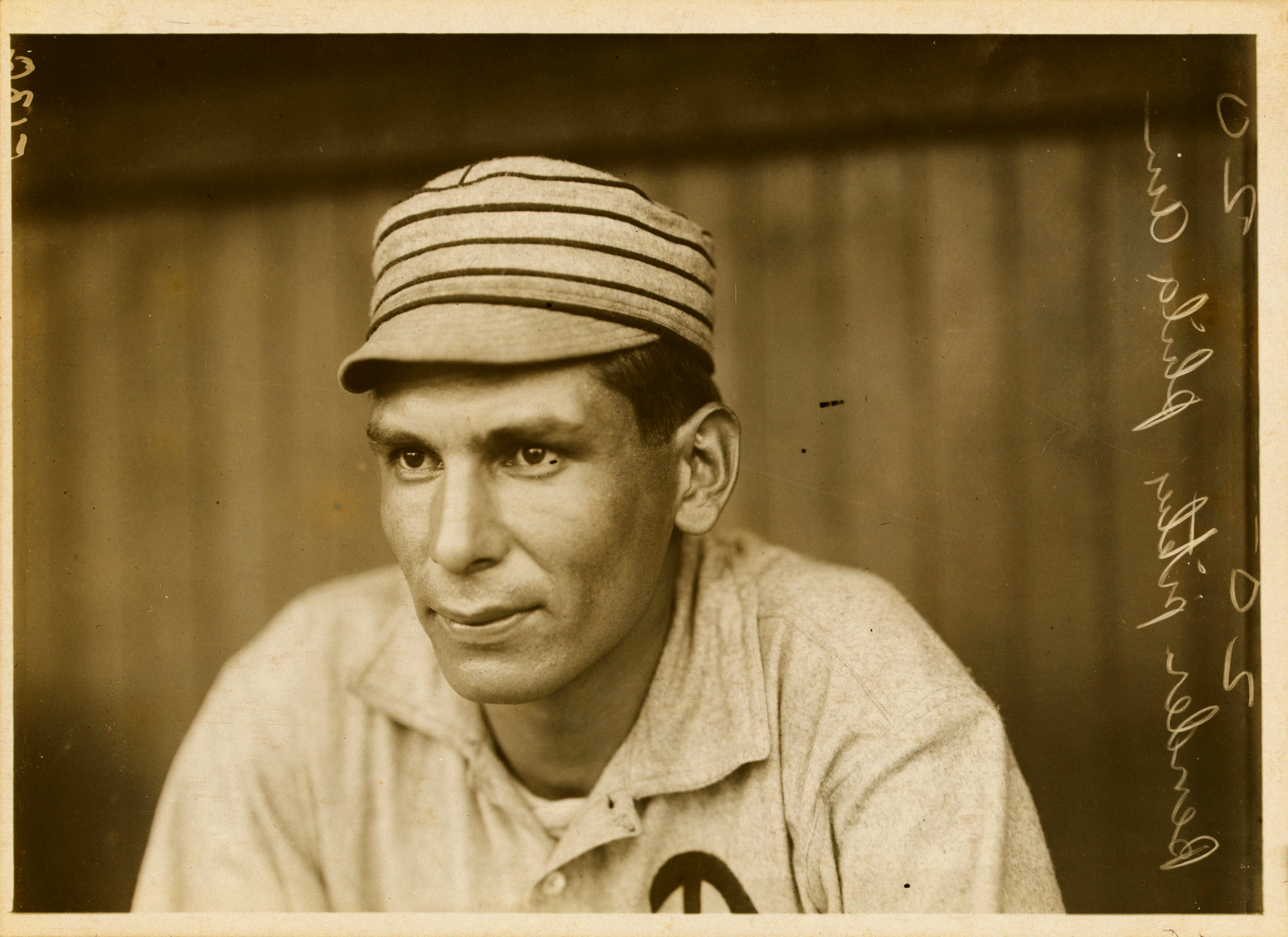
Chief Bender

While professional baseball was formally regarded as a strictly white-men-only affair, the racial color bar was primarily directed against black players. Other races were allowed to play in professional white baseball. One prominent example was Charles Albert Bender, a star pitcher for the Philadelphia Athletics in 1910. Bender was the son of a Chippewa mother and a German father and had the nickname "Chief" from the white players. As a result of this exclusive treatment of black players, deceptive tactics were used by managers to sign such players. This included several attempts, with the player's acquiescence, to sign black players and claim they were American Indian to circumvent the ban.

In 1901, John McGraw, manager of the Baltimore Orioles, tried to add Charlie Grant to the roster as his second baseman. He tried to get around the Gentleman's Agreement by trying to pass him as a Cherokee named Charlie Tokohama. Grant went along with the charade. However, his tryout in Chicago was attended by his black friends, giving him away, and he never got an opportunity to play ball in the Major League. On May 28, 1916, Canadian-American Jimmy Claxton temporarily broke the professional baseball color barrier when he played two games for the Oakland Oaks of the Pacific Coast League. Claxton was introduced to the team owner by a part-American Indian friend as a fellow member of an Oklahoma tribe. The Zee-Nut candy company rushed out a baseball card for Claxton. However, within a week, a friend of Claxton revealed that he had both Negro and Indigenous Canadian ancestors, and Claxton was promptly fired. It would be nearly thirty more years before another black man, at least one known to be black, played organized white baseball.

There possibly were attempts to have people of African descent be signed as Hispanics. One possible attempt may have occurred in 1911 when the Cincinnati Reds signed two light-skinned players from Cuba, Armando Marsans and Rafael Almeida. Both of them had played "Negro Baseball", barnstorming as members of the integrated All Cubans. When questions arose about them playing the white man's game, the Cincinnati managers assured the public that "they were as pure white as Castile soap". Regarding the signing of the Cubans, the black newspaper New York Age said, "Now that the first shock is over, it will not be surprising to see a Cuban a few shades darker breaking into the professional ranks. It would then be easier for colored players who are citizens of this country to get into fast company."

== Negro leagues ==
The Negro National League was founded in 1920 by Rube Foster, independent of the National Baseball Commission (1903–1920). The NNL was primarily based in the Midwest, and lasted until 1931, when it was disbanded due to financial problems. The Eastern Colored League was founded in 1923 as the second major Negro League circuit, and ran until 1928. In 1924, the NNL and ECL arranged for a Negro League World Series to be played between teams in both leagues. The tournament was played annually between 1924 and 1927. The Negro Southern League operated consecutively from 1920 to 1936, but was considered a minor league. The American Negro League was established in 1929, but only played one season. The second Negro National League was established in 1933, and was the only black professional league operating until 1937. The Negro American League was established in 1937 from independent clubs and former members of the Negro Southern League. Both persisted until integration. None of the Negro Leagues were members of Organized baseball, the system led by Commissioner Kenesaw Mountain Landis from 1921 until 1946.

== MLB influencers ==
=== Bill Veeck ===
The only serious attempt to break the color line during Landis's tenure came in 1942, when Bill Veeck tried to buy the then-moribund Philadelphia Phillies and stock them with Negro league stars. However, when Landis got wind of his plans, he and National League president Ford Frick scuttled it in favor of another bid by William D. Cox. In his 1962 autobiography, Veeck, as in Wreck, in which he discussed his abortive attempt to buy the Phillies, Veeck also stated that he wanted to hire black players for the simple reason that in his opinion the best black athletes "can run faster and jump higher" than the best white athletes. The authors of an article in the 1998 issue of SABR's The National Pastime argued that Veeck invented the story of buying the Phillies, claiming Philadelphia's black press made no mention of a prospective sale to Veeck. The article was strongly challenged by the historian Jules Tygiel, who refuted it point-by-point in an article in the 2006 issue of SABR's The Baseball Research Journal, and in an appendix, entitled "Did Bill Veeck Lie About His Plan to Purchase the '43 Phillies?", published in Paul Dickson's 2012 biography, Bill Veeck: Baseball's Greatest Maverick. Joseph Thomas Moore wrote in his 1988 biography of Doby, "Bill Veeck planned to buy the Philadelphia Phillies with the as yet unannounced intention of breaking that color line."

The Phillies ended up being the last National League team, and third-last team in the majors, to integrate, with John Kennedy debuting for the Phillies in 1957, 15 years after Veeck's attempted purchase.

=== Branch Rickey ===
In 1945, Branch Rickey, general manager of the Brooklyn Dodgers, was anticipating the integration of black players into Major League Baseball. Rickey, along with Gus Greenlee who was the owner of the original Pittsburgh Crawfords, created the United States League (USL) as a method to scout black players specifically to break the color line. It is unclear if the league actually played the 1945 season or if it was only used as a pretense for integration.

=== Sam Nahem ===
During the Second World War, President Roosevelt had the American military establish a formal baseball organization for the soldiers in order to boost morale and eventually in order to help reintroduce the soldiers back into regular civilian life. After the unconditional surrender of the Germans to the Allied Powers in May 1945, the American military expanded their baseball organization to the European Theater of Operations (ETO) with over 200,000 American soldiers participating; among the soldiers who participated were former and current Major League Baseball and Negro league baseball players. Until 1945, black soldiers were forced to play on all-black teams.

While stationed overseas in Rheims, France, Sam Nahem, who had MLB experience, was assigned to oversee and manage two baseball leagues in France as well as player-manage his own team: the Oise All-Stars. In a shocking decision–by the discriminatory social standards of the time–Nahem insisted on integrating black ballplayers into the All-Stars, recruiting Willard Brown and Leon Day. When Nahem was later asked about this decision and it potentially causing issues for his team he insisted, “[t]here was no problem. I made sure there would be nothing of that sort on my team.” Nahem, who had been heavily discriminated against for his Jewish ancestry and faith, was heavily sympathetic towards black individuals who were experiencing similar treatment. One of the many origins of the Civil rights movement and other efforts at integration in America stemmed from the treatment black veterans received at home versus overseas as well as the juxtaposition of fighting for democracy in Europe while segregation still existed in the United States.

== Jackie Robinson and Larry Doby ==
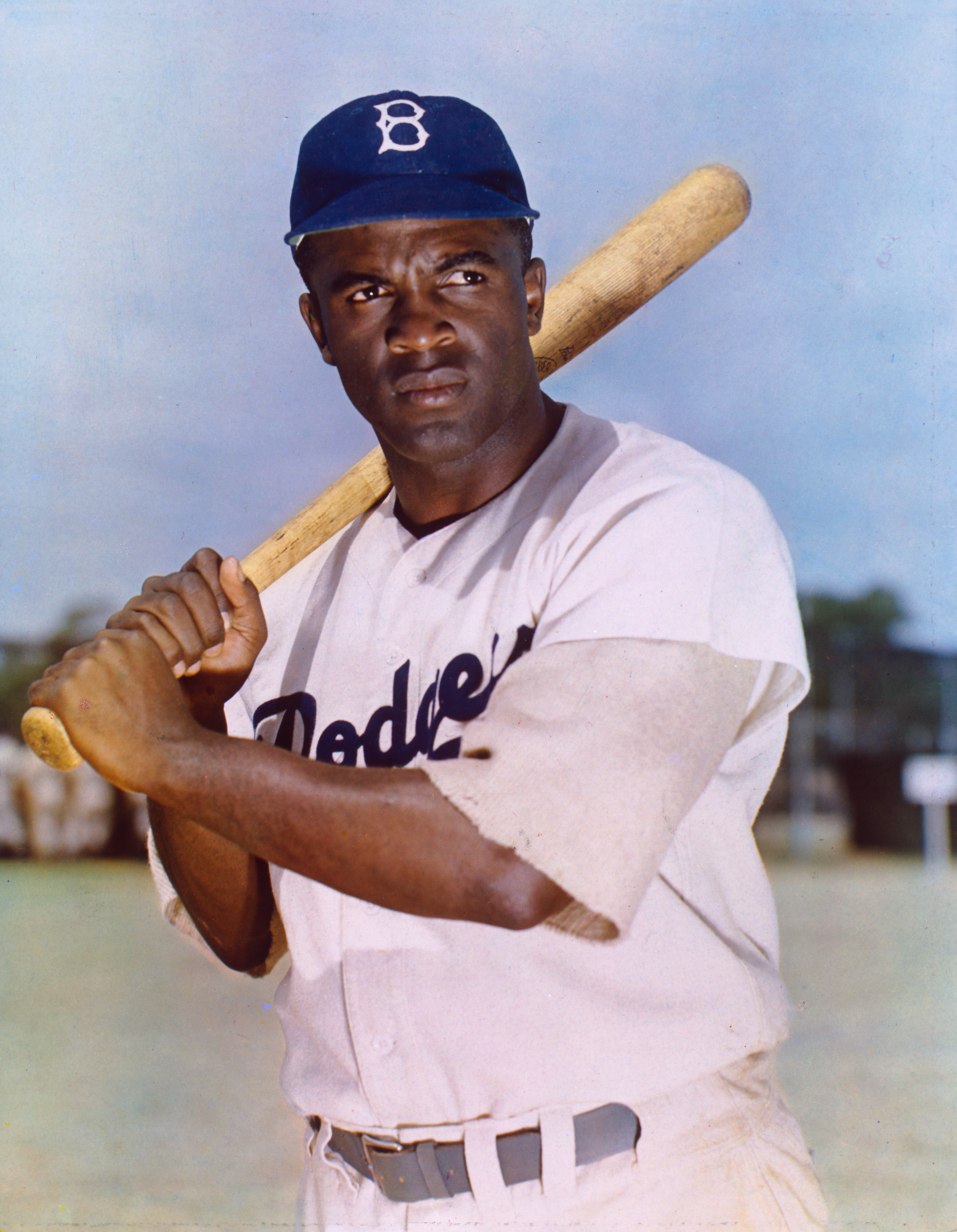
Robinson in 1949

The color line was broken when Rickey, with the support of new commissioner Happy Chandler, signed Jackie Robinson in October 1945, intending him to play for the Dodgers. Chandler mentioned that "If a Black boy can make it on Okinawa and Guadalcanal [in fighting World War II], hell, he can make it in baseball." After a year in the minor leagues with the Dodgers' top minor-league affiliate, the Montreal Royals of the International League, Robinson was called up to the Dodgers in 1947. He endured epithets and death threats and got off to a slow start. However, his athleticism and skill earned him the first ever Rookie of the Year award, which is now named in his honor. In 1947, Larry Doby signed with Bill Veeck's Cleveland Indians to become the American League's first black player. Doby, a more low-key figure than Robinson, suffered many of the same indignities that Robinson did, albeit with less press coverage. As baseball historian Daniel Okrent wrote, "Robinson had a two year drum roll, Doby just showed up." Both men were ultimately elected to the Baseball Hall of Fame on the merits of their play. Willard Brown played briefly in 1947 for the St. Louis Browns and was the first black player to hit a home run in the American League. He too was elected to the Hall of Fame based on his career in the Negro leagues.

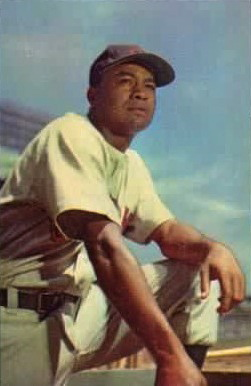
Larry Doby in 1953

Prior to the integration of the major leagues, the Brooklyn Dodgers led the integration of the minor leagues. Jackie Robinson and Johnny Wright were assigned to Montreal, but also that season Don Newcombe and Roy Campanella became members of the Nashua Dodgers in the class-B New England League. Nashua was the first minor-league team based in the United States to integrate its roster after 1898. Subsequently, that season, the Pawtucket Slaters, the Boston Braves' New England League franchise, also integrated its roster, as did Brooklyn's class-C franchise in Trois-Rivières, Quebec. With one exception, the rest of the minor leagues would slowly integrate as well, including those based in the southern United States. The Carolina League, for example, integrated in 1951 when the Danville Leafs signed Percy Miller Jr. to their team.

The exception was the Class AA Southern Association. Founded in 1901 and based in the Deep South, it allowed only one black player, Nat Peeples of the 1954 Atlanta Crackers, a brief appearance in the league. Peeples went hitless in two games played and four at bats on April 9–10, 1954, was demoted one classification to the Jacksonville Braves of the Sally League, and the SA reverted to white-only status. As a result, its major-league parent clubs were forced to field all-white teams during the 1950s. By the end of the 1950s, the SA also was boycotted by civil rights leaders. The Association finally ceased operation after the 1961 season, still a bastion of segregation. Its member teams joined the International, Sally, and Texas leagues, which were all racially integrated.

== Resistance by the Boston Red Sox ==
The Boston Red Sox were the last major league team to integrate, holding out until 1959, a few months after the Detroit Tigers. This was due to the steadfast resistance provided by team owner Tom Yawkey. In April 1945, the Red Sox refused to consider signing Jackie Robinson (and future Boston Braves outfielder Sam Jethroe) after giving him a brief tryout at Fenway Park. The tryout, however, was a farce chiefly designed to assuage the desegregationist sensibilities of Boston City Councilman Isadore H. Y. Muchnick, who threatened to revoke the team's exemption from Sunday blue laws. Even with the stands limited to management, Robinson was subjected to racial epithets. Robinson left the tryout humiliated. Robinson would later call Yawkey "one of the most bigoted guys in baseball".

On April 7, 1959, during spring training, Yawkey and general manager Bucky Harris were named in a lawsuit charging them with discrimination and the deliberate barring of black players from the Red Sox. The NAACP issued charges of "following an anti-Negro policy", and the Massachusetts Commission Against Discrimination announced a public hearing on racial bias against the Red Sox. Thus, the Red Sox were forced to integrate, becoming the last pre-expansion major-league team to do so when Harris promoted Pumpsie Green from Boston's AAA farm club. On July 21, Green debuted for the team as a pinch runner, and would be joined later that season by Earl Wilson, the second black player to play for the Red Sox. In the early to mid 1960s, the team added other players of color to their roster including Joe Foy, José Tartabull, George Scott, George Smith, John Wyatt, Elston Howard and Reggie Smith. The 1967 Red Sox went on to win the "Impossible Dream" pennant but lost to the St. Louis Cardinals in seven games in that year's World Series.

Tom Yawkey died in 1976, and his widow Jean Yawkey eventually sold the team to Haywood Sullivan and Edward "Buddy" LeRoux. As chief executive, Haywood Sullivan found himself in another racism controversy that ended in a courtroom. The Elks Club of Winter Haven, Florida, the Red Sox spring training home, did not permit black members or guests. Yet the Red Sox allowed the Elks into their clubhouse to distribute dinner invitations to the team's white players, coaches, and business management. When Tommy Harper, a popular black former player and coach for Boston, then working as a minor league instructor, protested the policy and a story appeared in The Boston Globe, he was promptly fired. Harper sued the Red Sox for racial discrimination and his complaint was upheld on July 1, 1986.

== Professional baseball firsts ==
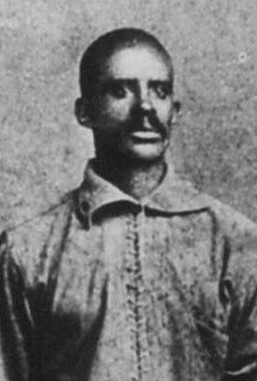
Bud Fowler

Listed chronologically

- Player, professional: Bud Fowler, 1878. Fowler never played in the major leagues.
- Player, major leagues: Moses Fleetwood Walker, debut game May 1, 1884, catcher for Toledo at Louisville
- All-black team, openly professional: Cuban Giants, 1885
- Integrated professional league in the U.S.: California Winter League, 1910
- Pitcher, major leagues: Dan Bankhead, debut game August 26, 1947, for Brooklyn at home
- World Series player: Jackie Robinson, Dan Bankhead for Brooklyn, 1947
- World Series pitcher: Satchel Paige for Cleveland Indians, 1948
- All-Star selection, major leagues: Roy Campanella, Larry Doby, Don Newcombe, Jackie Robinson, 1949
- MLB Most Valuable Player: Jackie Robinson, 1949
- National Baseball Hall of Fame, Jackie Robinson, 1962
- Coach, major leagues: Buck O'Neil, Chicago Cubs, 1962
- Field manager, Triple-A level: Héctor López, 1969
- First all-black and Latino lineup, major leagues: Pittsburgh Pirates, September 1, 1971, at Three Rivers Stadium†
- Field manager, major leagues: Frank Robinson, debut game April 8, 1975, for the Cleveland Indians at home‡
- General manager, major leagues: Bill Lucas, 1976 with the Atlanta Braves
- World Series-winning manager: Cito Gaston with the Toronto Blue Jays, 1992. He repeated the next season.
- World Series walk-off home run: Joe Carter, for the Toronto Blue Jays, 1993
- National League pennant-winning manager: Dusty Baker with the San Francisco Giants, 2002

† The Sporting News contemporaneously reported it as "the first all-Negro starting lineup"; later sources state Black and Latino or "all-minority".

‡ A case has been made for Ernie Banks as the de facto first black manager in the major leagues. On May 8, 1973, Chicago Cubs manager Whitey Lockman was ejected from a 12-inning game against the San Diego Padres. Coach Banks filled in as manager for the final two innings of the 3–2 Cubs win. Prior to the next season, the Official Baseball Guide published by The Sporting News stated, "he [Banks] became the major leagues' first black manager—but only for a day". The other two regular coaches on the team (Pete Reiser and Larry Jansen) were absent that day, opening this door for Banks for the one occasion, but Banks never became a manager on a permanent basis.

== See also ==
- History of baseball in the United States
- Negro league baseball
- Jim Crow laws#African American life
- List of first black Major League Baseball players
- Race and ethnicity in the NBA
- Racial issues faced by black quarterbacks
- List of black quarterbacks
- List of black NHL players
- List of African-American sports firsts
