= Black participation in college basketball =

Black people have been participating in American college basketball for over a century.

== Introduction at Howard ==
Thirteen years after basketball was invented, and after being exposed to the game over the summer at Harvard University, Coach Edwin Henderson introduced basketball to a physical education class at Howard University in Washington, D. C. By 1910, basketball was one of the most popular sports among young African-Americans. The game could be played on almost any surface, and it required little equipment. It was promoted largely in YMCAs in black neighborhoods, on basketball courts indoors and outdoors, at parks and on playgrounds.

By 1915, African-Americans played basketball in high school physical education classes, on college and university squads, and on club teams representing major urban cities. Some of the first predominantly black universities to form basketball teams include Hampton University in Virginia; Lincoln University in Pennsylvania; Wilberforce University in Ohio; and Virginia Union in Richmond. In 1916, the all-black Central Intercollegiate Athletic Association (CIAA) was formed, uniting Virginia Union, Shaw University (Raleigh, North Carolina), Lincoln and Howard in competition.

Four years later, the all-black Southeastern Athletic Conference was established, and by 1928 there were four all-black regional conferences.

== Collegiate play ==
At the college level, African-American athletes such as Paul Robeson at Rutgers University, Wilbur Wood at Nebraska, Fenwick Watkins at the University of Vermont and Cumberland Posey at Penn State and Duquesne became basketball stars before World War I in white major-college programs.

George Gregory, Jr., the 6'-4" captain and center of the Columbia University team from 1928–1931, became the first African American all-American college basketball player, in 1931.

Big Dave DeJernett, the 6–4 captain and center of integrated Indiana Central University, which won the mythical Indiana college conference championship with a 16–1 record in 1934 (Notre Dame and Purdue finishing 2nd and 3rd), became the first Afro-American four-year collegiate star to sign with a top-level professional contender when he agreed to play for the New York Rens in 1936.

Several black college basketball programs stood out. Xavier University of Louisiana won 67 games and lost only two between 1934 and 1938, and Alabama State University, Lincoln University in Missouri, Morgan State University in Maryland and Wiley College in Texas all produced exceptional basketball programs.

From the 1920s until 1947, few African-American players were allowed in major college programs. One notable exception was Jackie Robinson, a multi-sport star (1939–1941) at UCLA just before World War II, who went on to greater fame for breaking Major League Baseball's 20th-century color line. Robinson's honors at UCLA were impressive: for two years highest scorer in basketball competition in the Pacific Coast Conference, national champion long (then "broad") jumper, the school's first athlete to letter in four sports, All-American football halfback and varsity baseball shortstop. He left UCLA in 1941 because of financial pressures, not many credits away from a bachelor's degree. UCLA also had Don Barksdale, the first African-American consensus all-American basketball player in 1947. Barksdale would later be the first African-American to win an Olympic basketball gold medal (1948), a Pan-American basketball gold medal (1951), and would be the third African-American to sign an NBA contract after Chuck Cooper joined Boston and Earl Lloyd signed with Washington. He was the first African-American to play in the NBA All-Star Game.

In 1947, William Garrett integrated big-time college basketball by joining the basketball program at Indiana University. He broke the gentlemen's agreement that had barred black players from the Big Ten Conference, at that time college basketball's most important conference. While enduring taunts from opponents and pervasive segregation at home and on the road, Garrett became the best player Indiana had ever had, an all-American, and, in 1951, the third African-American drafted in the NBA. Within a year of his graduation from IU, there were six African-American basketball players on Big Ten teams.

Despite the examples set by DeJernett, the first Indiana Mr. Basketball George Crowe, and other Hoosier hoops stars like Muncie's Jack Mann, Whiteland's Ray Crowe, and Anderson's Jumpin' Johnny Wilson (not to mention Davage Minor and Chuck Harmon), Indiana was an unlikely place for a civil rights breakthrough. It was stone-cold isolationist, widely segregated and hostile to change. But in the late 1940s, Indiana had a leader of the largest black YMCA in the world, which viewed sports as a wedge for broader integration; a visionary university president, who believed his institution belonged to all citizens of the state; a passion for high school and college basketball; and a teenager who was, as nearly as any civil rights pioneer has ever been, the perfect person for his time and role. Slowly from there, Division I college basketball became integrated.

== Integration ==
The 1947–48 Indiana State Teacher's College (now Indiana State University) team, coached by John Wooden, was responsible for integrating post-season collegiate basketball tournaments.

The 1946–47 Sycamores won the Indiana Intercollegiate Conference title and received an invitation to the National Association for Intercollegiate Basketball tournament. Wooden refused the invitation, citing the NAIB's policy banning African American players. One of Wooden's players was Clarence Walker, an African-American from East Chicago, Indiana.

The following season (1947–48), Coach Wooden again led Indiana State to the conference title. The NAIB had reversed its policy banning African-American players that year; with the support of the NAACP and Walker's parents, Wooden and Indiana State accepted the invitation and led the Sycamores to the NAIB National Tournament final, losing to Louisville. That year, Walker became the first African-American to play in any post-season intercollegiate basketball tournament, coming off the bench and scoring eight points.

The lifting of the ban on black players also meant the NAIB champion would be eligible for an automatic berth in the 1948 Olympic Trials. The higher-profile NIT and NCAA tournaments finally integrated two years later.

The University of San Francisco Dons men's basketball team coached by Phil Woolpert was the first team with three black starters to win the NCAA championship in 1955. They were led by black future Hall of Famers Bill Russell and KC Jones and supported by a third black starter Hal Perry. The following year 1956 they went undefeated (29–0) and again won the NCAA championship even though KC Jones was declared ineligible for the NCAA tournament. Black sixth man Eugene Brown replaced Jones for the tournament run.

The Loyola University (Chicago) teams of the early 1960s, coached by George Ireland, are thought to be responsible for ushering in a new era of racial equality in the sport by shattering a major color barrier in NCAA men's basketball. Beginning in 1961, Loyola broke the longstanding gentlemen's agreement not to play more than three black players at any given time, putting as many as four black players on the court at every game. For the 1962–63 season, Ireland's Loyola team played four black starters in every game. That season, Loyola also became the first team in NCAA Division I history to play an all-black lineup, doing so in a game against Wyoming in December 1962.

In 1963, Loyola shocked the nation and changed college basketball forever by starting four black players in the NCAA Tournament, as well as the Championship game. Loyola's stunning 60–58 overtime upset of two-time defending NCAA champion Cincinnati was the crowning achievement in the school's nearly decade-long struggle with racial inequality in men's college basketball, highlighted by the tumultuous events of that year's NCAA Tournament. Loyola's 1963 NCAA title was historic not only for the racial makeup of Loyola's team, but also because Cincinnati started three black players, making seven of the ten starters in the 1963 NCAA Championship game black.

Clem Haskins and Dwight Smith became the first black athletes to integrate the Western Kentucky Hilltoppers basketball program in the Fall of 1963. This put Western Kentucky at the forefront to integrate college basketball in the Southeast.

Another memorable event for African Americans in college basketball came three years later in the 1966 NCAA championship game, in which Texas Western College (now University of Texas at El Paso) coach Don Haskins started five African-American players. The Miners beat favorite Kentucky 72–65 to win the 1966 NCAA title. The team's victory inspired the 2006 movie Glory Road. The Hilltoppers were 2 points away from defeating Michigan and meeting Kentucky in the Mideast regional final of the 1966 NCAA tournament. A controversial foul called against Greg Smith during a jump ball put Cazzie Russell on the free throw line for Michigan, where he scored the tying and winning baskets.

== Coaching ==
In 1967, Cleveland State hired John McLendon as the first African-American head coach of a major college basketball program.

In 1970, Illinois State hired Will Robinson as the second African-American head coach of a major college basketball program.

In 1984, John Thompson Jr. became the first African-American head coach to win the NCAA Men's Division I Basketball Championship when the Georgetown Hoyas defeated the University of Houston 84–75. In 2007, his son, John Thompson III led the Hoyas to the Final Four becoming the first father-son coaching duo, regardless of race, to lead their respective teams to a Final Four appearance.

== Documentary presentation ==
In March 2008, ESPN broadcast a film titled Black Magic, which is four-hour documentary that portrays the on- and off-court struggles of black basketball players at historically black colleges.

== See also ==
- Race and ethnicity in the NBA
- Black college football national championship
- List of African-American sports firsts
