= Ed Miller (outfielder) =

American baseball player

- Outfielder
- Born: Tecumseh, Michigan
- Batted: Unknown Threw: Unknown

MLB debut
- July 18, 1884, for the Toledo Blue Stockings

Last MLB appearance
- August 2, 1884, for the Toledo Blue Stockings

MLB statistics
- At bats: 24
- RBI: 1
- Home Runs: 0
- Batting average: .250
- Stats at Baseball Reference

Teams
- Toledo Blue Stockings (1884)

L. Edward Miller was an American professional baseball player who played outfield in the American Association for the 1884 Toledo Blue Stockings.
