= Ed Kent =

American baseball player (1859–1943)

- Pitcher
- Born: September 17, 1859; Stockport, New York, U.S.
- Died: December 22, 1943 (aged 84); Rutherford, New Jersey, U.S.
- Batted: Right Threw: Right

MLB debut
- August 14, 1884, for the Toledo Blue Stockings

Last MLB appearance
- August 14, 1884, for the Toledo Blue Stockings

MLB statistics
- Win–loss record: 0–1
- Earned run average: 6.00
- Strikeouts: 4
- Stats at Baseball Reference

Teams
- Toledo Blue Stockings (1884)

Edward Clarence Kent (September 19, 1859 – December 12, 1943) was an American Major League Baseball pitcher who played from 1884 with the Toledo Blue Stockings. He batted and threw right-handed.

Kent was born in 1859 in Stockport, New York, and died in Rutherford, New Jersey at the age of 84.
