= Race and ethnicity in the NBA =

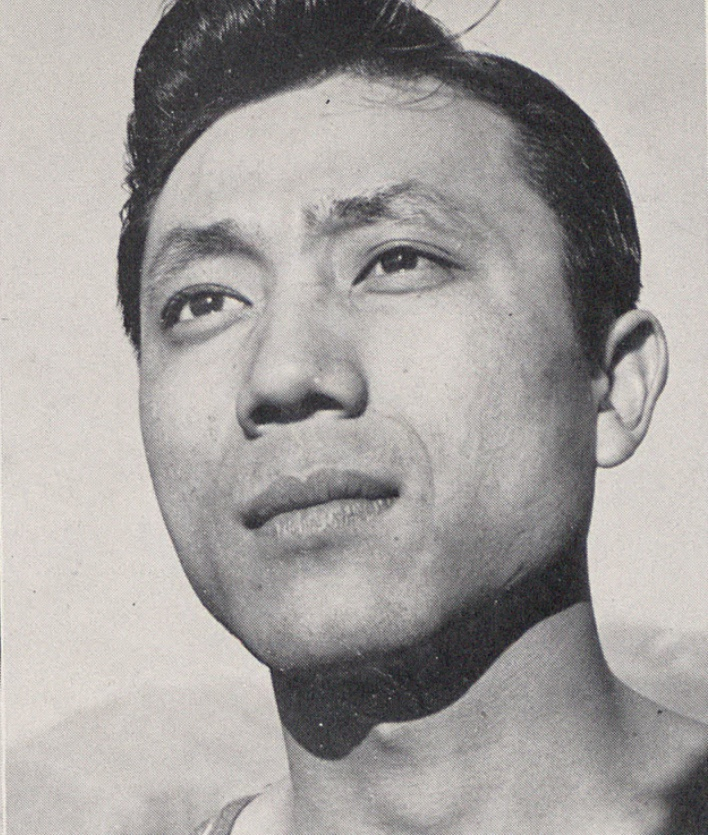
Asian American point guard Wat Misaka broke basketball's color barrier as the first non-white player to play in the NBA in 1947.

The composition of race and ethnicity in the National Basketball Association (NBA) has changed throughout the league's history. The first non-white player to play in the league was an Asian American, Wat Misaka, in 1947. African Americans entered the league beginning in 1950. According to racial equality activist Richard Lapchick, the NBA in 2023 was composed of 70.4 percent black players, 17.5 percent white players, 2.2 percent Latino players of any race, and 0.2 percent Asian players. Additionally, 9.7 percent of the players were classified as either multiracial or "other" races. The league has the highest percentage of black players of any major professional sports leagues in the United States and Canada.

== History ==
=== Players ===
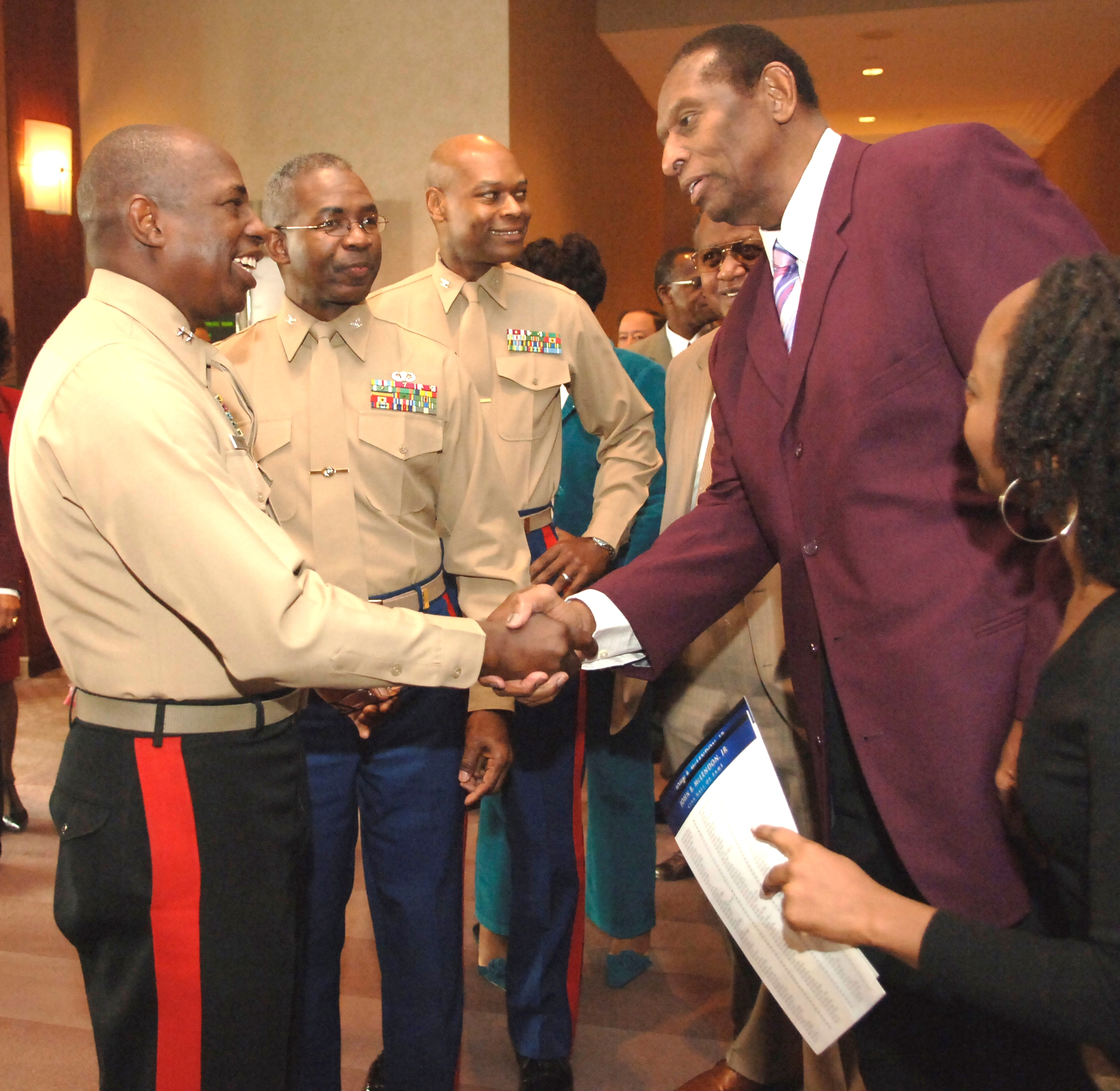
Earl Lloyd (right) was the first African American to play in the NBA in 1950.

The NBA was founded in June 1946, with its first season played in 1946–47. Wat Misaka debuted in 1947–48 as the first non-white player and the first Asian American to play in the league.

African Americans first appeared in the NBA in 1950. Chuck Cooper was the first black player drafted in the NBA. On April 26, 1950, Harold Hunter signed with the Washington Capitols, becoming the first African American to sign a contract with any NBA team in history. However, Hunter was cut from the team during training camp and did not play professionally. On May 24, Nathaniel "Sweetwater" Clifton was the second African American player to sign an NBA contract. (Note: Some sources conflict and list Clifton as the first African American to sign in the NBA.) Earl Lloyd was the first to play in the NBA. Hank DeZonie also played that year. In 1953, Don Barksdale became the first African American to play in an NBA All-Star Game.

With the emergence of African American players by the 1960s, the NBA game was stylistically being played faster and above the rim. Many of the league's great players were black. At that time, African Americans believed they were limited by an unofficial league quota of four black players per team.

Puerto Rican Butch Lee in 1978 was the first Latino in the league. Wang Zhizhi became the first Chinese player in 2001. In 2010, Jeremy Lin became the first American of Chinese or Taiwanese descent to play in the NBA.

In 2011, Richard Lapchick with The Institute for Diversity and Ethics in Sport (TIDES) of the University of Central Florida reported in their annual Racial and Gender Report Card that 17 percent of the league's players were white, the lowest since the report began in 1990. (Note: Lapchick began the reports, known previously as the Racial Report Card, while with the Center for the Study of Sport in Society at Northeastern University.) Hall of Fame player and Indiana Pacers president of basketball operations Larry Bird, who is white, stated in 2004 that the league needed more white players since the league's fans are mostly white. "And if you just had a couple of white guys in there, you might get them [the fans, not the guys] a little excited. But it is a black man's game, and it will be forever. I mean, the greatest athletes in the world are African American," said Bird.

More recently, a number of commentators and fans have remarked on the league's dwindling number of white American players. While a TIDES study found that the NBA was 18.3 percent white in the 2015–16 season, this number also included non-Americans, most notably Europeans. During the entire 1996–97 season, only three NBA teams did not field an American-born white; on the opening day of the 2016–17 season, eight teams did not have a white American on their roster, and an additional 10 teams had only one. At the latter point in time, fewer than 10 percent of NBA players were American-born whites (43 out of a possible 450).

NBA player composition by year
- White
- Black
- Latino
- Asian
- Other

=== Coaches ===
Bill Russell in 1966 became the first non-white and African American head coach in the NBA. In the late 1980s, teams began hiring black coaches in large numbers. In the 2011–12 season, the league had an NBA-high 16 head coaches of color, including its then-high 14 black coaches. At the start of the 2015–16 season, there were seven black head coaches in the league, down 50 percent from three years earlier, and the fewest in 16 years. At the beginning of the 2022–23 season, the NBA had a record-high 15 black head coaches and matched its high of 16 head coaches of color.

=== Owners ===
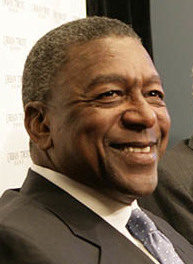
Robert Johnson became the first black majority NBA team owner in 2004.

Robert Johnson of the Charlotte Bobcats (now known as the Charlotte Hornets) was the first black majority team owner in the NBA in 2004–05. He was succeeded as Bobcats owner in 2010–11 by another African American, Michael Jordan. In 2013–14, Jordan and Sacramento Kings owner Vivek Ranadivé, who is Indian, marked the first time in the history of major pro sports leagues in the U.S. that there were two non-white majority owners in a league. The number of NBA teams with non-white majority owners increased to three in September 2019 with the league approval of Taiwanese Canadian entrepreneur Joseph Tsai's purchase of Russian Mikhail Prokhorov's 51 percent share in the Brooklyn Nets. Tsai had previously held a 49 percent interest in the team, having acquired that stake from Prokhorov in 2018, and exercised an option to purchase the remaining interest before its 2021 expiration date.

=== Viewership demographics ===
Among NBA fans during the 2013–14 season, African Americans (844 minutes) and Asian Americans (719) spent the most time watching the league, followed by Hispanics (of any race, 390) and whites (290). Furthermore, according to a Nielsen's survey, the NBA has the highest share of black viewers, with 45 percent of its viewers being black and 40 percent of viewers being white, making it the only top North American sport that did not have a white majority audience.

During the 2016–17 season, 66 percent of the league's viewers were racial and ethnic minorities. Its audience was 47 percent blacks, 34 percent whites, 11 percent Hispanics (of any race), and 8 percent Asians.

Timothy J. Piper examines how the NBA uses archival sports video in its advertising to give the impression that racial issues don't exist in the league, despite the fact that they do. The NBA tried to revitalize its brand prior to 2007 as a result of issues like dwindling attendance and broadcast ratings. In particular, it introduced a "business casual" attire policy for players in 2005 as part of its effort to distance itself from facets of hip-hop culture. The league's efforts to solve its economic fall were tied to this clothing code, which was intended to redefine player uniforms for NBA commerce, according to then-NBA Commissioner David Stern. This was all in order to enhance the league's image; some players welcomed this idea. The article also notes the NBA's 2007 advertising campaign, "Where Amazing Happens," which featured archival footage and signaled a change in the league's branding approach. The goal of this campaign, which marked a change from prior ones, was to portray the NBA as varied but "raceless".

== See also ==
- Black participation in college basketball
- Race and sports
- Baseball color line
- List of NBA players born outside the United States
- List of foreign NBA coaches
- Race and ethnicity in the NHL
- List of African-American sports firsts
- Race and ethnicity in the United States
