= George Meister =

American baseball player (1854–1928)

- Third baseman
- Born: January 1854; Baltimore, Maryland, U.S.
- Died: December 27, 1928 (aged 74); Pittsburgh, Pennsylvania, U.S.
- Batted: Unknown Threw: Unknown

MLB debut
- August 15, 1884, for the Toledo Blue Stockings

Last MLB appearance
- October 15, 1884, for the Toledo Blue Stockings

MLB statistics
- Batting average: .193
- Home runs: 0
- Runs scored: 9
- Stats at Baseball Reference

Teams
- Toledo Blue Stockings (1884)

George Meister (January 1854 – December 27, 1928) was an American professional baseball player. A third baseman, he played part of one season in Major League Baseball for the 1884 Toledo Blue Stockings of the American Association.
