= Moses Fleetwood Walker =

African-American baseball player and author (1856–1924)

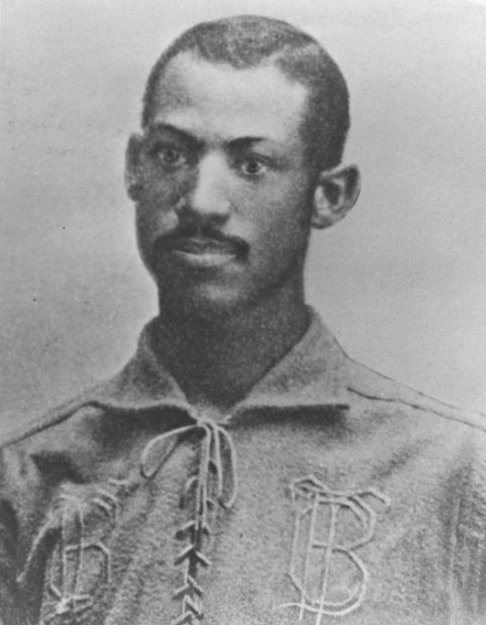
- Walker, c. 1884
- Catcher
- Born: October 7, 1856; Mount Pleasant, Ohio, U.S.
- Died: May 11, 1924 (aged 67); Cleveland, Ohio, U.S.
- Batted: Right Threw: Right

MLB debut
- May 1, 1884, for the Toledo Blue Stockings

Last MLB appearance
- September 4, 1884, for the Toledo Blue Stockings

MLB statistics
- Games played: 42
- Batting average: .263
- Hits: 40
- Runs scored: 23
- Stats at Baseball Reference

Teams
- Toledo Blue Stockings (1884)

Moses Fleetwood Walker (October 7, 1856 – May 11, 1924), sometimes nicknamed Fleet Walker, was an American professional baseball catcher credited with being the first black man to play major league baseball. A native of Mount Pleasant, Ohio, and a star athlete at Oberlin College as well as the University of Michigan, Walker played for semi-professional and minor league baseball clubs before joining the Toledo Blue Stockings of the American Association (AA) for the 1884 season.

Though research by the Society for American Baseball Research (SABR) indicates William Edward White was the first African-American baseball player in the major leagues, Walker, unlike White (who passed as a white man and self-identified as such), was the first to be open about his black heritage despite the widespread prejudice. His brother, Weldy Walker, followed suit the same year, joining the Toledo ball club. Walker played just one season, 42 games total, before injuries led to his release.

Walker played in the minor leagues until 1889, and was the last African-American to participate on the major league level before Jackie Robinson broke baseball's color line in 1947. After his baseball career, he became a successful businessman and inventor. As an advocate of black nationalism, Walker also jointly edited a newspaper, The Equator, with his brother. He published a book, Our Home Colony (1908), to explore ideas about emigrating back to Africa. He died in 1924 at the age of 67.

== Biography ==
=== Early life ===
Moses Fleetwood Walker was born in 1856 in Mount Pleasant, a working-class town in Eastern Ohio that had served as a sanctuary for runaway slaves since 1815. Its population included a large Quaker community and a unique collective of former Virginian slaves. Walker's parents, Moses W. Walker and Caroline O'Harra, were both biracial. According to Walker's biographer David W. Zang, his father came to Ohio from Pennsylvania, likely a beneficiary of Quaker patronage, and married O'Harra, who was a native of the state, on June 11, 1843.

When Walker was three years old, the family moved 20 miles northeast to Steubenville where Walker senior became one of the first Black physicians in Ohio, and later a minister of the Methodist Episcopal Church. There, Walker's fifth or sixth sibling, his younger brother Weldy, was born the same year. Walker and Weldy attended Steubenville High School in the early 1870s, just as the community passed legislation for racial integration.

As an adult, Walker enrolled at Oberlin College in 1878, where he majored in philosophy and the arts. At Oberlin, Walker proved himself to be an excellent student, especially in mechanics and rhetoric, but by his sophomore year, he was rarely attending classes. How Walker first came to play baseball is uncertain: according to Zang, the game was popular among Steubenville children, and while in Oberlin's preparatory program Walker became the prep team's catcher and leadoff hitter. Oberlin men played baseball as early as 1865—including a "jet black" first baseman whose presence meant Walker was not the college's first Black baseball player—with organized clubs that engaged in intense matchups. Walker gained stardom and was mentioned in the school newspaper, The Oberlin Review, for his ball-handling and ability to hit long home runs.

In 1881, Oberlin lifted their ban on off-campus competition. Walker, joined by Weldy who enrolled in the class of 1885, played on the baseball club's first inter-collegiate team.

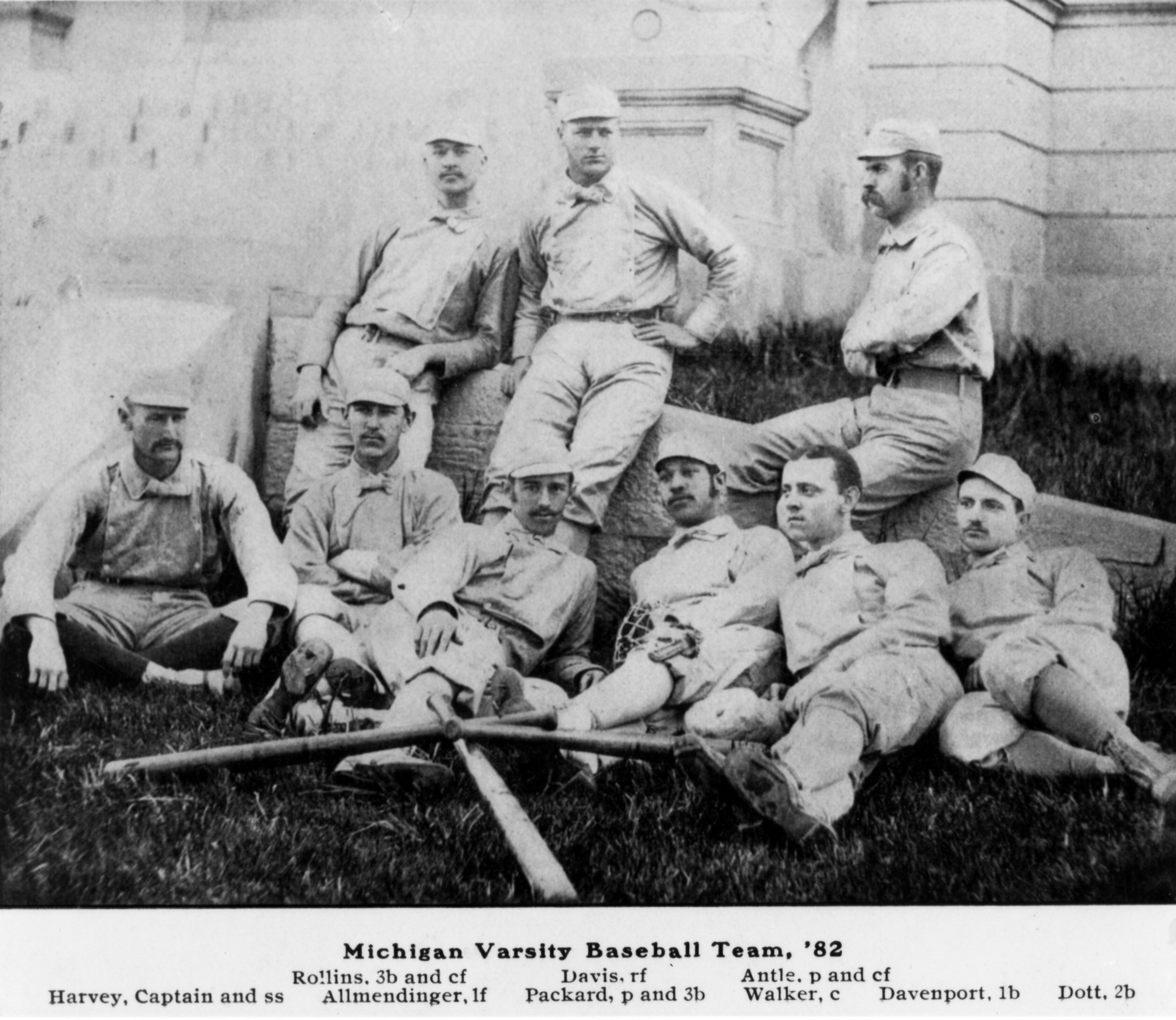
1882 University of Michigan baseball team (Walker front row, third from right)

By Oberlin pitcher Harlan Burket's account, Walker's performance in the season finale persuaded the University of Michigan to recruit him to their own program. Transfer regulations at the time were generally informal and recruiting players from opposing teams was not unusual. Accompanying Walker was his pregnant girlfriend, Arbella Taylor, whom he married a year later. Michigan's baseball club had been weakest behind the plate; the team had gone as far as to hire semi-professional catchers to fill the void. With Walker, the team performed well, finishing with a 10–3 record in 1882. He mostly hit second in the lineup and is credited with a .308 batting average (BA).

During his time at Michigan, Walker was paid by the White Sewing Machine Company of Cleveland to play for their semi-professional ball club in August 1881. Walker's presence was controversial when the team arrived for a game in Louisville, Kentucky, the first place to have a major issue with his race. As the team arrived in the early morning of the game, Walker was turned away from the Saint Cloud Hotel. More issues arose during game time: members of the Louisville Eclipse protested Walker's participation; Cleveland relented and held him out of the lineup. After one inning, his substitute claimed his hands were too badly bruised to continue, and Walker hesitantly walked on to the field for warm-ups. Louisville again protested and refused to resume play until Cleveland's third baseman volunteered to go behind the plate.

=== Baseball career ===
In mid-1883, Walker left his studies at Michigan and was signed to his first professional baseball contract by William Voltz, manager of the Toledo Blue Stockings, a Northwestern League team. As a former sportswriter for the Cleveland Plain Dealer, Voltz watched Walker play for Oberlin; his signing reunited Walker with his former battery-mate Burket.

Although Walker hit in decent numbers, recording a .251 batting average, he became revered for his play behind the plate and his durability during an era where catchers wore little to no protective equipment and injuries were frequent. The Blue Stockings' ball boy recalled Walker "occasionally wore ordinary lambskin gloves with the fingers slit and slightly padded in the palm; more often he caught barehanded". Nonetheless, he played in 60 of Toledo's 84 games during their championship season. At the core of the team's success, one sportswriter at Sporting Life pointed out, were Walker and pitcher Hank O'Day, which he considered "one of the most remarkable batteries in the country."

Walker's entrance into professional baseball caused immediate friction in the league. Before he had the opportunity to appear in a game, the executive committee of the Northwestern League debated a motion proposed by the representative of the Peoria, Illinois club that would prohibit all colored ballplayers from entering the league. After intense arguments, the motion was dropped, allowing Walker to play. On August 10, 1883, in an exhibition against the Chicago White Stockings, Chicago's manager Cap Anson refused to play if Walker was in the lineup. In response, Charlie Morton, who replaced Voltz as Toledo's manager at mid-season, challenged Anson's ultimatum by not only warning him of the risk of forfeiting gate receipts, but also by starting Walker at right field. Anson is alleged to have said "We'll play this here game, but won't play never no more with the nigger in". The White Stockings won in extra innings, 7–6.

The Blue Stockings' successful season in the Northwestern League prompted the team to transfer as a unit to the American Association, a major league organization, in 1884. Walker's first appearance as a major league ballplayer was an away game against the Louisville Eclipse on May 1, 1884; he went hitless in three at-bats and committed four errors in a 5–1 loss. Throughout the 1884 season, Walker regularly caught for ace pitcher Tony Mullane. Mullane, who described the rookie ballplayer as "the best catcher I ever worked with," purposefully threw pitches that were not signaled just to cross up the catcher. Walker's year was plagued with injuries, limiting him to just 42 games in a 104-game season. For the season, he had a .263 BA, which was top three on his team, but Toledo finished eighth in the pennant race. The rest of the team was also hampered by numerous injuries: circumstances led to Walker's brother, Weldy, joining the Blue Stockings for six games in the outfield.

Throughout the 1884 season, Walker continued to deal with issues simply because of his race. One notable example came in September of 1884, when the Blue Stockings were preparing to face the Richmond Virginians. Richmond did not want to face Walker, so they penned a letter to the Blue Stockings manager, stating, "We hope you will listen to our words of warning, so there will be no trouble, and if you do not, there certainly will be." Walker wound up not playing in the series anyway, due to a broken hand. At that time, it was revealed that the letter was fake, and was a racist prank signed by fake players.

Toledo's team, under financial pressure at season's end, worked to relieve themselves of their expensive contracts. Not yet fully recovered from a rib injury sustained in July, Walker was released by the Blue Stockings on September 22, 1884.

During the offseason, Walker took a position as a mail clerk, but returned to baseball in 1885, playing in the Western League for 18 games. For the second half of 1885, he joined the baseball club in Waterbury for 10 games. When the season ended, Walker reunited with Weldy in Cleveland to assume the proprietorship of the LeGrande House, an opera theater and hotel. According to Zang, Walker could afford the business venture after commanding a $2,000 contract as a major leaguer. Though he could no longer negotiate such a salary, his skills were still highly attractive to teams: Walker returned to Waterbury in 1886 when the team joined the more competitive Eastern League.

Despite a lackluster season for Waterbury, Walker was offered a position with the defending champion Newark Little Giants, an International League team. Together, with pitcher George Stovey, Walker formed half of the first African-American battery in organized baseball. Billed as the "Spanish battery" by fans, Stovey recorded 35 wins in the season, while Walker posted career highs in games played, fielding percentage, and BA. Walker followed Newark's manager Charlie Hackett to the Syracuse Stars in 1888. Although he slumped at the plate during his two years playing for the Stars, he was popular among Syracuse fans, so much so that Walker was their unofficial spokesman and established business ties in the city. On August 23, 1889, Walker was released from the team; he was the last African-American to play in the International League until Jackie Robinson.

=== Later life ===
On April 9, 1891, Walker was involved in an altercation outside a saloon with a group of white men. Bricklayer Patrick "Curly" Murray, approached Walker and reportedly threw a stone at his head, dazing him. Walker responded by fatally stabbing Murray with a pocket knife. After a brief chase, Walker surrendered to police, claiming self-defense, but was charged with second-degree murder (lowered from first-degree murder). On June 3, 1891, Walker was found not guilty by an all-white jury. He returned to Steubenville to work for the postal service, handling letters for the Cleveland and Pittsburgh Railroad.

On June 12, 1895, Walker's wife Arabella died of cancer at 32 years old; he remarried three years later to Ednah Mason, another former Oberlin student. He involved himself with the Knights of Pythias and later the Negro Masons. Then in September 1898 Walker was arrested, convicted, and sentenced to one year in prison for mail robbery which he served in Miami County and Jefferson County Jail. After his release during the turn of the century, Walker jointly owned the Union Hotel in Steubenville with Weldy and managed the Opera House, a movie theater in nearby Cadiz. As host to opera, live drama, vaudeville, and minstrel shows, Walker became a respected businessman.

In 1902, the brothers explored ideas of Black nationalism as editors for The Equator, although no copies exist today as evidence. Walker expanded upon his works about race theory in The Equator by publishing the book Our Home Colony (1908). Regarded as "the most learned book a professional athlete ever wrote," Our Home Colony shared Walker's thesis on the victimization of the black race and a proposal for African-Americans to emigrate back to Africa.

Ednah died on May 26, 1920. Widowed again, Walker sold the Opera House and managed the Temple Theater in Cleveland with Weldy. On May 11, 1924, Walker died of lobar pneumonia at 67 years of age. His body was buried at Union Cemetery-Beatty Park next to his first wife.

== Legacy ==
Although Jackie Robinson is very commonly miscredited with being the first black player to play major league baseball, Walker held the honor among baseball aficionados for decades. In 2007, researcher Pete Morris discovered that another ball player, the formerly enslaved William Edward White, actually played a single game for the Providence Grays around five years before Walker debuted for the Blue Stockings. Despite these findings, baseball historians still credit Walker with being the first in the major leagues to play openly as a black man. On the subject of White, John R. Husman wrote: "He played baseball and lived his life as a white man. If White, who was also of white blood, said he was white and he was not challenged, he was white in his time and circumstances." Like Robinson, however, Walker endured trials with racism in the major leagues and was thus the first black man to do so.

Walker was inducted into the Oberlin College Hall of Fame in 1990.

In 2002, Moses Fleetwood Walker Square was dedicated in Toledo, Ohio outside of Fifth Third Field to honor Walker's contribution to the history of baseball in that city.

In 2021, indie-folk artist Cousin Wolf released a song entitled "Moses Fleetwood Walker" as part of an album called Nine Innings.
