= William Edward White =

American baseball player (1860–1937)

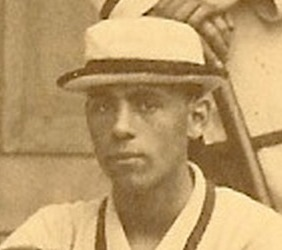
- White photographed as a member of the 1879 Brown University baseball team
- First baseman
- Born: October 1860; Milner, Georgia, U.S.
- Died: March 29, 1937 (aged 76); Chicago, Illinois, U.S.
- Batted: Unknown Threw: Unknown

MLB debut
- June 21, 1879, for the Providence Grays

Last MLB appearance
- June 21, 1879, for the Providence Grays

MLB statistics
- Games played: 1
- Runs: 1
- Hits: 1
- Stats at Baseball Reference

Teams
- Providence Grays (1879)

William Edward White (October 1860 – March 29, 1937) was a 19th-century American baseball player. He played as a substitute in one professional baseball game for the Providence Grays of the National League, on June 21, 1879. Work by the Society for American Baseball Research (SABR) suggests that he may have been the first African-American to play major league baseball, predating the longer careers of Moses Fleetwood Walker and his brother Weldy Walker by five years, and Jackie Robinson by 68 years.

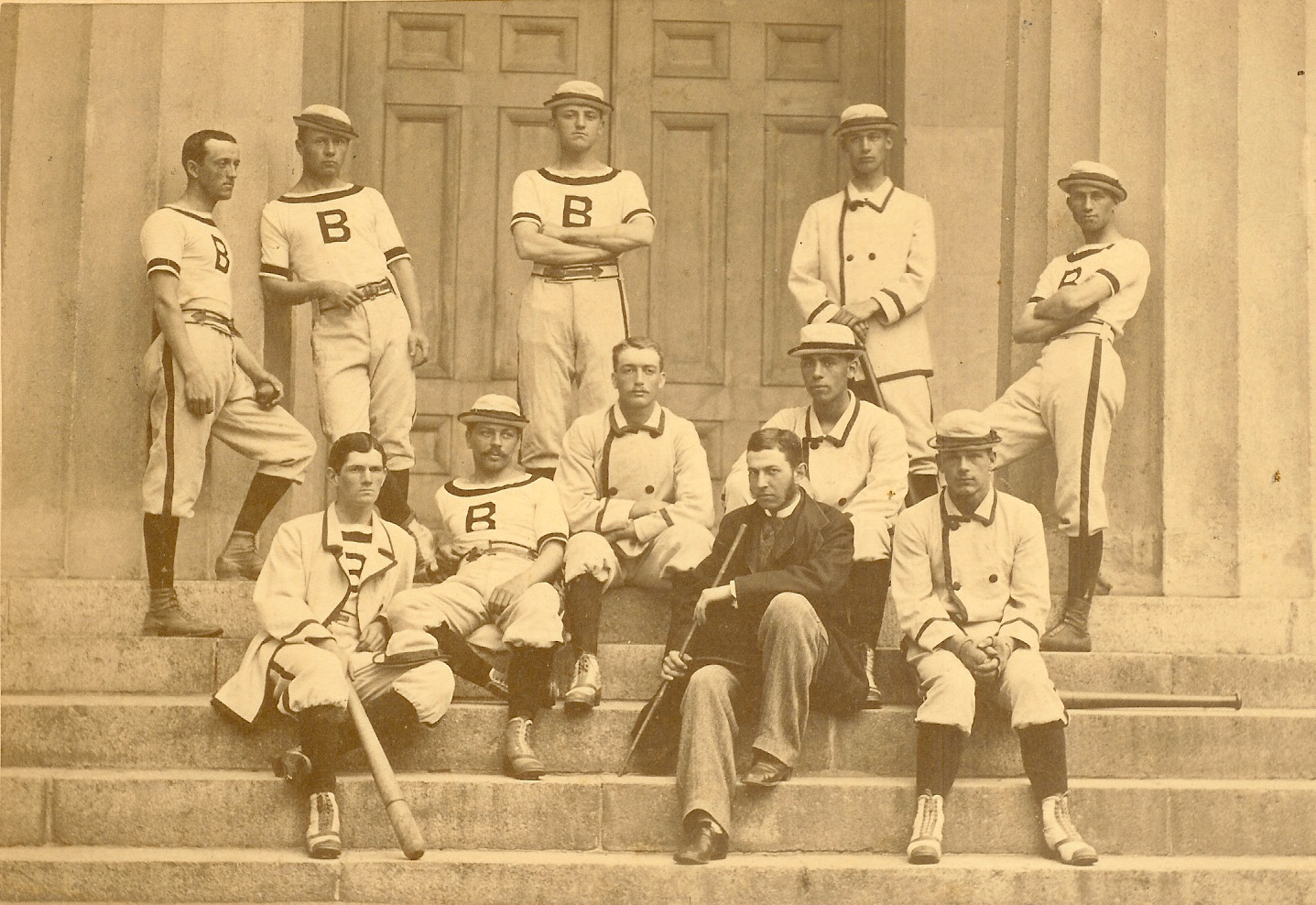
William Edward White, seated second from right, with the 1879 Brown University varsity baseball team

Very little is known about White, who replaced the regular first baseman, Joe Start, after the latter was injured. White was a student at Brown University and played for the college's team. He went 1-for-4, scored a run, and recorded 12 putouts as Providence won, 5–3. It is unknown why White did not play for the Grays again. He was replaced in the next game by future Hall of Famer "Orator Jim" O'Rourke.

SABR's research indicates that the William Edward White who took the field that day was born into slavery as the son of a plantation owner from Milner, Georgia, Andrew Jackson White, and a black woman owned by White, Hannah. University records give Milner as the student's birthplace, and the only person of his name listed in the 1870 census was a nine-year-old mulatto boy who was one of three children living with his mother Hannah. All three of these children are named in A.J. White's 1877 will, which described them as the children of his servant Hannah White and stipulated that they be educated in the North. If the research by SABR is correct, then William White was not only the first black player in the major leagues, but may also have been the only former slave. Unlike the Walker brothers, White passed and self-identified in multiple Census records as white, and may not have faced the virulent racism prevalent in the late 19th century.

According to 1900 and 1910 census records, White moved to Chicago and became a bookkeeper. He is listed there as having been born in Rhode Island and being white. He died in Chicago on March 29, 1937 from blood poisoning resulting from a fall.

== See also ==
- Bud Fowler
