= Richard Lapchick =

American activist

Richard E. Lapchick is a human rights activist and sportswriter.

== Early years ==
Lapchick's life passion began in Germany at the age of 14 while touring the Nazi internment camps of Dachau. While he was in Europe during the 1960 Summer Olympic Games, he discovered the profound impact that sports can have across all lines of race, color, creed, and religion. It was then that his dream to use sport as a vehicle for social change was born.

It reinforced his early experiences witnessing public hostility toward his father Joe Lapchick when, as the coach of the New York Knicks, he signed Nat "Sweetwater" Clifton, the first African-American player signed in the NBA in 1950. His earliest memory as a five-year-old was seeing an image of his father swinging from a tree across the street from his house where people were picketing against the inclusion of a black athlete in a "white" team.

== Activist work ==
In the 1970s, Lapchick started fighting apartheid and led the boycott of South African participation in international sports events, the Davis Cup in particular. Lapchick was physically attacked in his college office in February 1978 just as it looked like the Davis Cup was going to be canceled. He was attacked by men who proceeded to carve N-I-G-E-R into his stomach. Lapchick worked for the United Nations from 1978 to 1984. His activism led to a personal invitation from Nelson Mandela upon his presidential inauguration in 1994 after anti-apartheid movements were successful.

Lapchick founded the Center for the Study of Sport in Society (CSSS) in 1984 at Northeastern University and is now Director Emeritus. In 1993, Lapchick co-founded the Mentors in Violence Prevention program.

One year after the center's inception, Lapchick wanted to take its mission national and established the National Consortium for Academics and Sports (NCAS). For 40 years, the NCAS/ ISSJ has been "creating a better society by focusing on educational attainment and using the power and appeal of sport to positively affect social change." The NCAS was renamed the Institute for Sport and Social Justice

Lapchick helped create the National Student-Athlete Day in 1988 which to date has recognized more than 2.6 million high school students for being citizen-scholar-student-athletes.

Lapchick was engaged by the NBA in 2014 to help construct the case for why continued ownership of the Los Angeles Clippers by Donald Sterling was detrimental to the NBA after his racist remarks became public.

Lapchick is active in work against human trafficking and has added Shut-Out Trafficking to the NCAS's effort to combat human trafficking with week-long programs on NCAS campuses. Since 2014-15 there have been week-long programs on 28 NCAS campuses connecting with more than 54,570 participants. The program is partnered with the US Fund for UNICEF and the USOC Athletes Advisory Council and is funded by the Fetzer Institute.

Lapchick is a regular columnist for ESPN.com and the Sports Business Journal.

== Academic career ==
Lapchick received a doctorate in international history from the Graduate School of International Studies (now the Josef Korbel School of International Studies) at the University of Denver.

Lapchick was an associate professor of political science at Virginia Wesleyan College from 1970 to 1978 and a senior liaison officer at the United Nations between 1978 and 1984. He then served as director at Northeastern University's Center for the Study of Sport in Society for 17 years.

Lapchick accepted the endowed chair of the DeVos Sport Business Management Program at the University of Central Florida's College of Business Administration in 2001. In 2009 it was named the #1 MBA program in the nation for volunteer service. In 2015, Sport Business International named DeVos as one of the top three graduate sports business programs in the United States as well as one of the top five graduate sports business management programs internationally. During his time at DeVos, Lapchick was named as "One of the 100 Most Powerful People in Sport".

Lapchick retired from the University of Central Florida in August 2023.While at the University of Central Florida, he remained President of the National Consortium for Academics and Sports (NCAS) and has established The Institute for Diversity and Ethics in Sport (TIDES) which serves as a comprehensive resource for issues related to gender and race in amateur, collegiate and professional sports. He is the author of the Racial and Gender Report Card (RGRC) published by TIDES.

In December 2006, Lapchick, his wife Ann, daughter Emily, and a group of DeVos students formed the Hope for Stanley Foundation (HFS), which has worked to help rebuild New Orleans. HFS has also worked with tornado victims in Tuscaloosa, AL, in New York with the victims of Hurricane Sandy, and in Baton Rouge, LA with victims of the flooding that impacted the community in August 2016. From the first visit until the outbreak of Covid, the group spent 58 weeks in New Orleans and worked on 155 homes.

== Awards ==
In 2009, the Rainbow/PUSH Coalition and Rev. Jesse Jackson honored him for "lifetime achievement in working for civil rights." Lifelong friend Kareem Abdul-Jabbar presented the award to Lapchick on behalf of Rev. Jackson. In 2023, Lapchick won an ESPY and was named the Muhammad Ali Humanitarian of the Year .

== Written works ==
- 100 Trailblazers: Great Women Athletes Who Opened Doors for Future Generations
- 100 Pioneers: African-Americans Who Broke Color Barriers in Sport
- 100 Heroes: People in Sports Who Make This a Better World
- New Game Plan for College Sport
- Smashing Barriers: Race and Sport in the New Millennium
- Never Before, Never Again: The Stirring Autobiography of Eddie Robinson, the Winningest Coach in the History of College Football
- Sport in Society: Equal Opportunity or Business as Usual?
- Five Minutes to Midnight: Race and Sport in the 1990s
- Rules of the Game: Ethics in College Sport
- On the Mark: Putting the Student Back in Student-athlete
- Fractured Focus: Sport as a Reflection of Society
- Broken Promises: Racism in American Sports
- Oppression and Resistance: The Struggle of Women in Southern Africa
- Politics of Race
- International Sport: The Case of South Africa
