= Toledo Blue Stockings =

Union Association baseball team

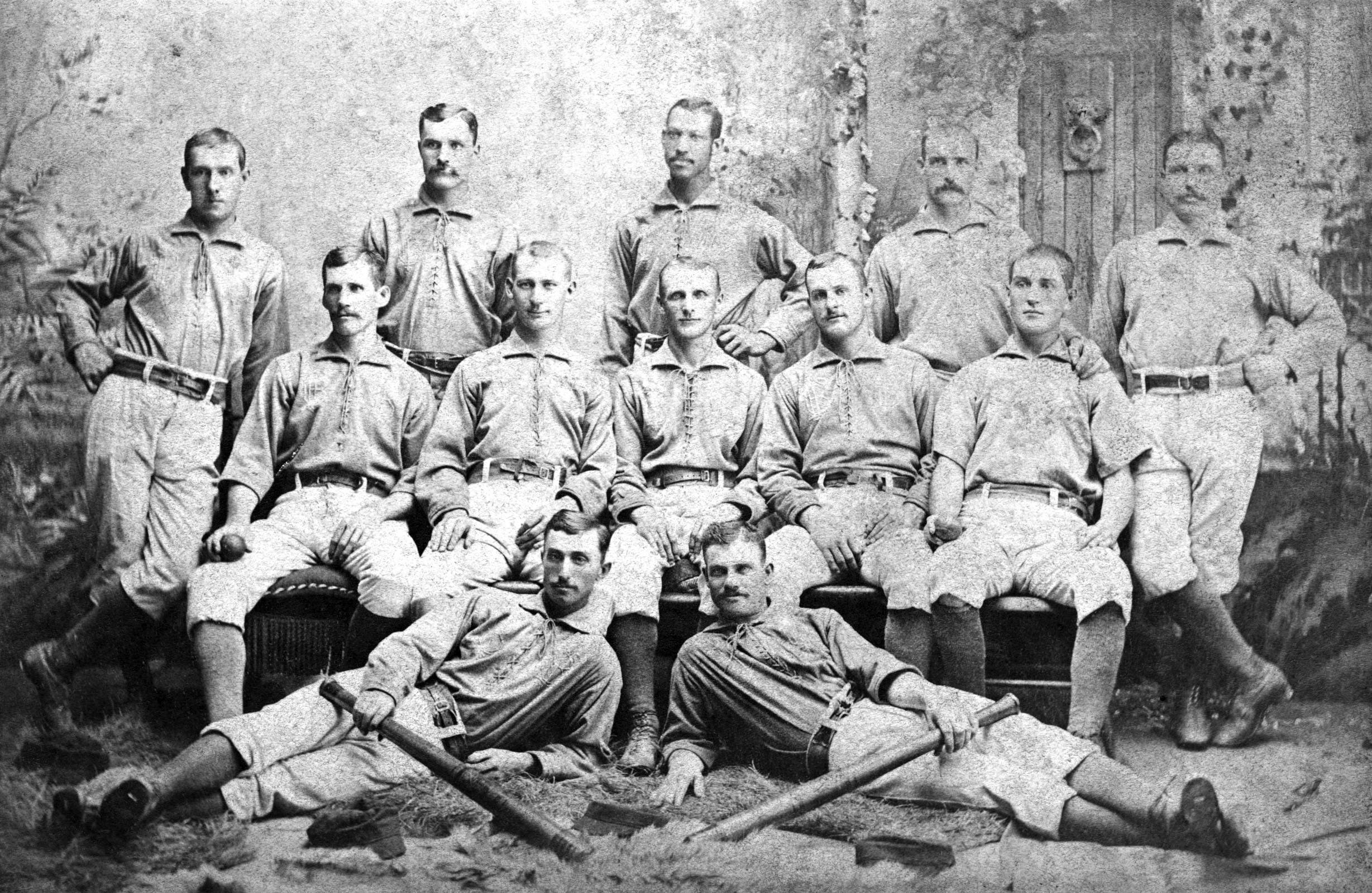
1884 Toledo Blue Stockings

The Toledo Blue Stockings formed as a minor league baseball team in Toledo, Ohio, in 1883. Their home ballpark was League Park. The following year, they joined the major league American Association. That year, they finished 8th with a 46–58 record. The team returned to the minors the next year and disbanded after the 1885 season.

The team was one of only two major league teams with black players (brothers Moses Fleetwood Walker and Weldy Walker) along with the Providence Grays (William Edward White) prior to Jackie Robinson's appearance with the Brooklyn Dodgers in 1947. This was before baseball's color barrier had been firmly established in 1887.

== Notable players ==
- Tony Mullane
- Hank O'Day
- Moses Fleetwood Walker
- Weldy Walker

== See also ==
- Toledo Blue Stockings all-time roster
- 1884 Toledo Blue Stockings season
