= Weldy Walker =

American baseball player (1860–1937)

- Walker cropped from portrait of the 1881 Oberlin College baseball team
- Outfielder / Third baseman / Catcher
- Born: July 27, 1860; Steubenville, Ohio, U.S.
- Died: November 23, 1937 (aged 77); Steubenville, Ohio, U.S.
- Batted: Unknown Threw: Right

MLB debut
- July 15, 1884, for the Toledo Blue Stockings

Last MLB appearance
- August 6, 1884, for the Toledo Blue Stockings

MLB statistics
- Games played: 5
- Batting average: .222
- Hits: 4
- Stats at Baseball Reference

Teams
- Toledo Blue Stockings (1884)

Weldy Wilberforce Walker (July 27, 1860 – November 23, 1937), sometimes known as Welday Walker and W. W. Walker, was an American professional baseball player. In 1884, he became the third African American to play Major League Baseball.

Walker played at Oberlin College and the University of Michigan. In July 1884, he joined the Toledo Blue Stockings of the American Association which was then part of Major League Baseball. His brother Moses Fleetwood Walker, commonly known as Fleetwood (or "Fleet") Walker, was the second African American to play Major League Baseball, making his debut two months before Weldy. In 1887, as racial segregation took hold in professional baseball, Weldy joined the Pittsburgh Keystones of the short-lived National Colored Base Ball League.

His March 1888 open letter to The Sporting Life protesting the racial segregation of baseball has been described as "perhaps the most passionate cry for justice ever voiced by an athlete."

After retiring from baseball, Walker operated restaurants and a hotel in eastern Ohio. In 1897, he served on the Executive Committee of the Negro Protective Party, a newly formed political party established in Ohio in protest of the failure of the Republican governor to investigate the lynching of an African American in June 1897 at Urbana, Ohio. In the 1900s, Weldy and his brother Fleetwood became active in the Back-to-Africa movement and promoted emigration to Liberia. The brothers also established and edited The Equator, a black issues newspaper.

== Early years ==
Walker was born in 1860 in Steubenville, Ohio, an industrial city in the eastern part of the state with a reputation for racial tolerance. Weldy's name was a combination of the biblical word for wealthy ("weldy") and the surname of English abolitionist William Wilberforce.

His parents, Moses W. Walker and Caroline (O'Hara) Walker, moved to Steubenville from Mount Pleasant, Ohio. His father was a minister in the Methodist Episcopal Church, a physician, and a leader in Steubenville's African-American community. In June 1870, at the time of the 1870 United States census, the Walker family was living in Steubenville's First Ward. Walker's father was identified as a minister who had been born in Virginia. The couple had four children listed in the Census: William (age 25), Mary (age 21), Sarah (age 19), Moses F. (age 11) and Weldy W. (age 9). In June 1880, at the time of the 1880 United States census, the family was still living in Steubenville and consisted of Moses (age 59, clergyman), Caroline (age 57), William (age 35, teamster), Sarah (age 22), Moses (age 21, at school), Weldan (age 19, at school), and Mary Alexander (age 13, adopted).

Weldy attended Steubenville's integrated public high school in the 1870s.

== College baseball ==
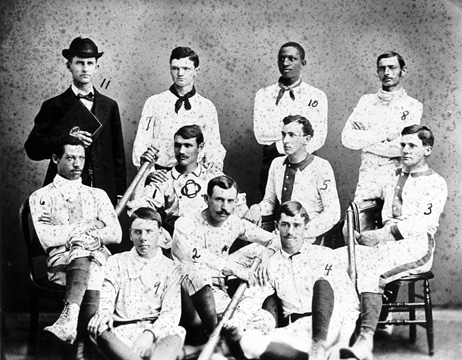
1881 Oberlin College baseball team with Fleetwood Walker (seated at left) and Weldy Walker (standing in back row, second from the right)

While Weldy was still in high school, his older brother, Fleetwood Walker, enrolled at Oberlin College, which was among the first colleges in the United States to become racially integrated. In 1881, Weldy joined his brother at Oberlin College, enrolling as a student in the Oberlin's preparatory school. In the spring of 1881, the Walker brothers played on Oberlin College's first varsity inter-collegiate baseball team. Weldy, a freshman, played right field while Fleetwood, a junior, was the catcher. According to one account, Weldy played second base and finished the 1881 season as Oberlin's second leading batter.

After the 1881 baseball season, Weldy's brother Fleetwood transferred to the University of Michigan and played as a catcher for the Michigan Wolverines baseball team in 1882. Fleetwood became the first African American to play on a varsity sports team at Michigan and helped lead the Wolverines to a 10–3 record, a conference championship, and the best record for a Michigan baseball team up to that time. Weldy initially remained at Oberlin, but he transferred to Michigan in the fall of 1882 as a student in the homeopathic medical school. In the fall of 1882, the Oberlin Review reported: "Weldy Walker, '85 leaves to assist his brother in making the 'Ann Harbor' [sic] nine a little more able to compete with Oberlin." Two weeks later, a writer for an Ann Arbor newspaper noted that "we have added to the list Weldy Walker, a magnificent fielder, safe batter, and phenomenal base runner." Before the 1883 baseball season began, Fleetwood left Michigan to play professional baseball for a team from New Castle, Pennsylvania.

During the 1883 season, Weldy became the second African American to play for the Michigan baseball team. He played third base for Michigan and also served on the board of directors of the University Base-Ball Association. Weldy also played for Michigan as a catcher during part of the 1884 baseball season. Weldy scored four runs and had four hits in five at-bats to help Michigan defeat Michigan Agricultural College (later known as Michigan State University) on June 14, 1884. According to Rich Adler's book Baseball at the University of Michigan, each of the Walker brothers was "accepted as a member of the student body," although neither received a degree from the university.

== Professional baseball ==
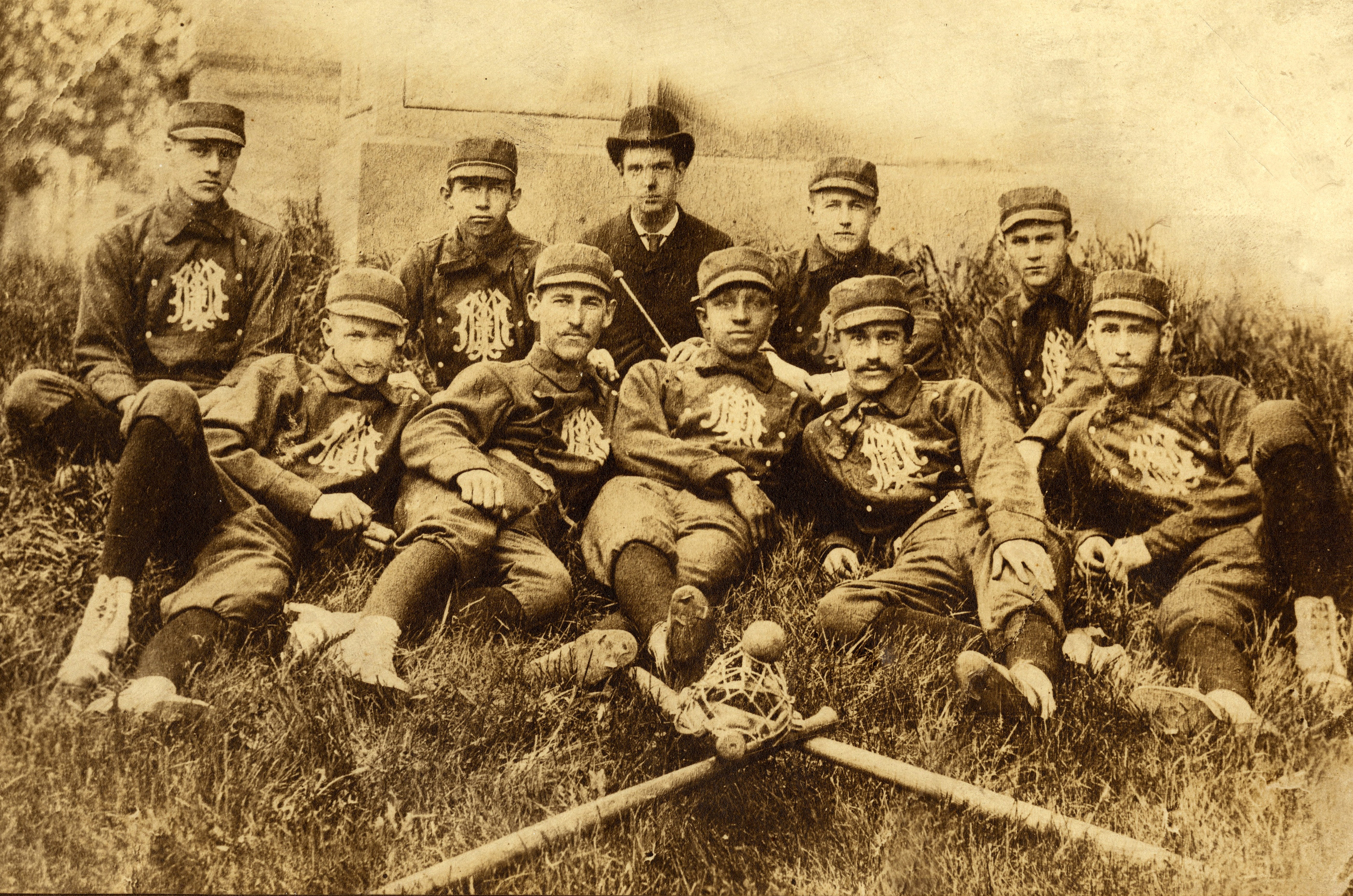
1883 Michigan baseball team, Weldy Walker in the center of the front row

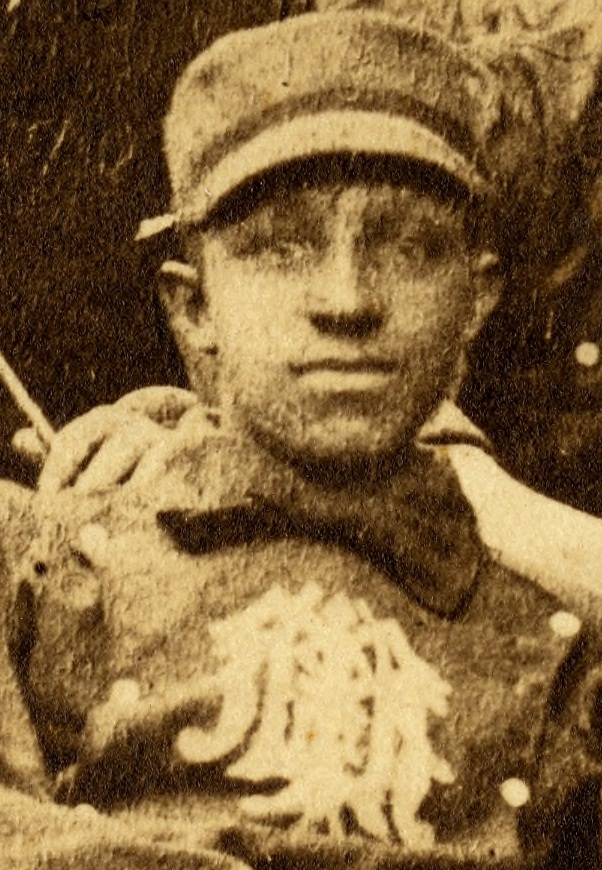
Weldy Walker cropped from 1883 team portrait

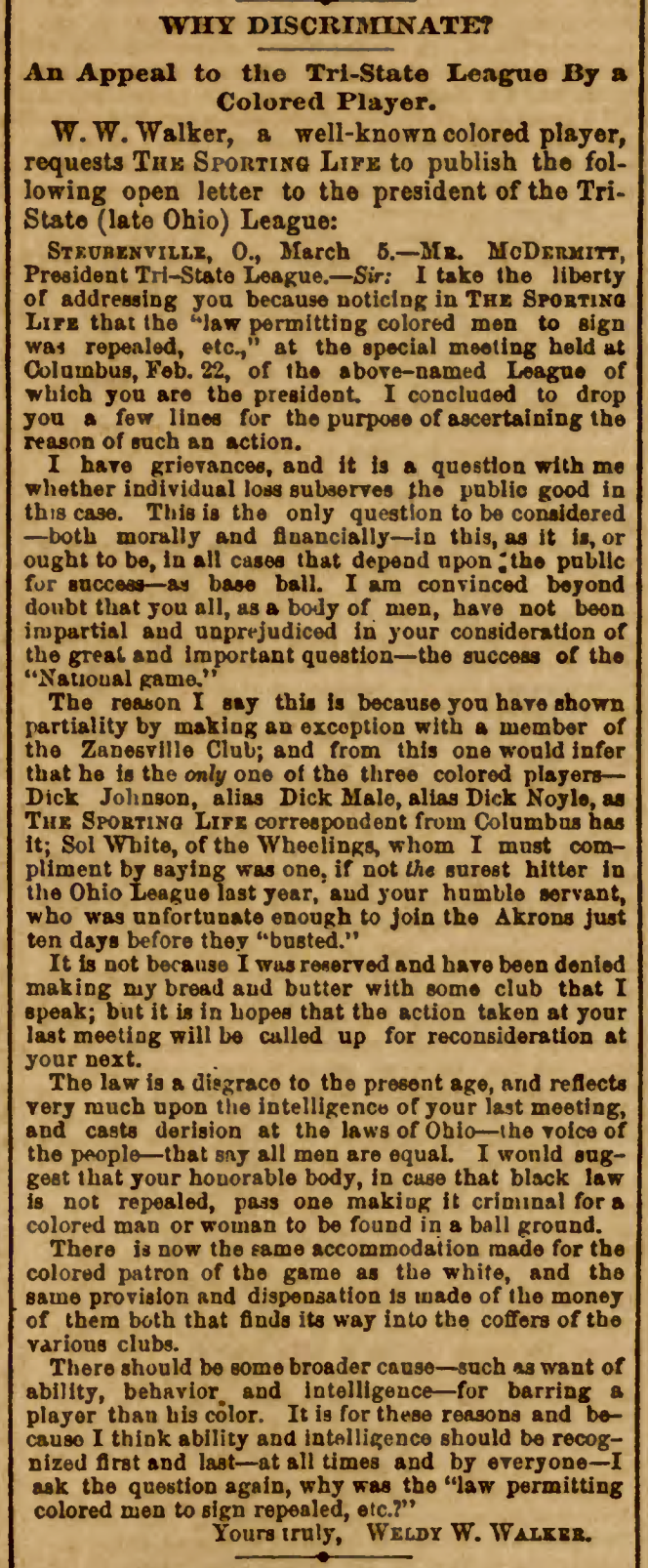
Walker's March 1888 letter published in The Sporting Life

=== Toledo Blue Stockings ===
At the start of the 1884 baseball season, Weldy continued to study homeopathic medicine and play baseball at Michigan. Meanwhile, Fleetwood was playing for the Toledo Blue Stockings of the American Association, which was considered to be part of Major League Baseball. On May 1, 1884, Fleetwood became the first African American to play in Major League Baseball.

As the 1884 baseball season progressed, the roster of the Toledo Blue Stockings was depleted by injuries. In need of additional players, the team recruited Weldy to join his brother in Toledo. Weldy appeared in his first game for the Blue Stockings on July 15, 1884, becoming the second African American to play Major League Baseball. Weldy appeared in five games as an outfielder for the Blue Stockings between July 15 and August 6, 1884. He had four hits, two runs batted in, and one run scored in 18 at-bats for a .222 batting average. After a series in Indianapolis, an article in The Sporting Life noted that "the Toledos were short-handed and played Weldy Walker, a brother of the catcher; he played well." The Walker brothers in 1884 were the last African Americans to play Major League Baseball for more than 60 years until Jackie Robinson joined the Brooklyn Dodgers in 1947.

=== Segregation of baseball and minor leagues ===
Weldy blamed Chicago White Stockings player-manager Cap Anson for the fact that neither he, his brother, nor any other African Americans were allowed to play in the major leagues after 1884. During the 1884 season, Anson refused to play against Toledo until the Walker brothers were benched. In 1887, Anson again refused to play against the Newark team on which Fleetwood played. Anson biographer David L. Fleitz shared Weldy's belief that Anson was responsible for the game's segregation: "Cap Anson, more than anyone else, was the man who wielded the infamous pen."

Following his time with the Blue Stockings, Weldy played for the Cleveland team in the Western League. During the 1885 season, Weldy compiled a .375 batting average for the Cleveland Forest Cities. In 1886, Weldy played third base for the Excelsior Club in Cleveland.

=== Open letter on racial segregation ===
By early 1887, 13 African Americans were playing in the "white" minor leagues, including four in the Ohio State League. Weldy began the season with the Akron Acorns of the Ohio State League. However, he appeared in only four games for the Acorns. During the 1887 season, racial segregation began to become the official policy in certain minor leagues. Weldy was outraged by a report that the Tri-State League (successor to the Ohio State League) had abandoned racial integration. In March 1888, he wrote a letter to the league's president protesting the decision. In his 1970 history of racial segregation in baseball, Robert Peterson described Weldy's letter as "perhaps the most passionate cry for justice ever voiced by a Negro athlete." In the letter, Walker wrote:

The law is a disgrace to the present age, and reflects very much upon the intelligence of your last meeting, and casts derision at the laws of Ohio – the voice of the people – that say all men are equal. I would suggest that your honorable body, in case that black law is not repealed, pass one making it criminal for a colored man or woman to be found on a ball ground ... There should be some broader cause – such as lack of ability, behavior and intelligence – for barring a player, rather than his color. It is for these reasons and because I think ability and intelligence should be recognized first and last – at all times and by everyone – I ask the question again, 'Why was the law permitting colored men to sign repealed, etc.?'

On March 14, 1888, and at Weldy's request, his letter was published in The Sporting Life under the headline "Why Discriminate?" In his book on baseball's segregation, Robert Peterson wrote that Weldy's question "went unanswered, because it was unanswerable . . . but the truth was plain for all who wished to see it: Jim Crow was warming up."

=== Pittsburgh Keystones ===
In 1887, Weldy joined the Pittsburgh Keystones in the newly formed National Colored Base Ball League and compiled a .360 batting average in five games as a player. Although the National Colored Base Ball League disbanded after a short time, the Keystones continued to play as an independent team. Weldy took over as the team's manager in 1888 and led the Keystones to a 9–1 record in the first ten games of the season. The Keystones' lineup in 1888 also included Sol White. In early June 1888, The Cleveland Gazette wrote that Weldy was "making quite a success of the Keystone Base Ball Club."

== Civil rights efforts and business career ==
=== 1884 civil rights lawsuit ===
Walker became involved in a civil rights lawsuit in 1884 after a roller-skating rink in Steubenville denied entry to Walker and his friend, Hannibal Lyons. The Cleveland Gazette, an African-American weekly newspaper, described the circumstances as follows:

Steubenville, like many other places, is suffering now from the roller skate craze. There are now three in full blast and prospects for more. Discrimination on account of color never was carried on in Steubenville until these strangers starting rinks here issued the edict "No Negroes need apply except for positions of menials." On the 16th there was an opening night at the South Side Rink, and two of our young men of gentlemanly deportment and honest reputation applied for admission. The proprietor of the rink flatly told them, "You are colored and you can't skate."

Walker and Lyons filed a civil rights lawsuit accusing the operator, Massey & Son, of racial discrimination. Some local newspaper accounts of the suit suggested that "Walker and Lyons were troublemakers stirring a 'political and social racket.'" Following a trial in January 1885, the presiding judge, Justice May, ruled that the skating rink operator had violated the rights of Walker and Lyons "under the civil rights law, and a special law of the Ohio Legislature giving the colored man certain privileges." The court awarded them each fifteen dollars in damages, with costs. However, the court declined to enter an order requiring the rink operator to admit African Americans. In his biography of Fleetwood Walker, David Zang called the court's ruling "a judgment that nominally supported integration while doing nothing to promote it in everyday reality."

=== Negro Protective Party ===
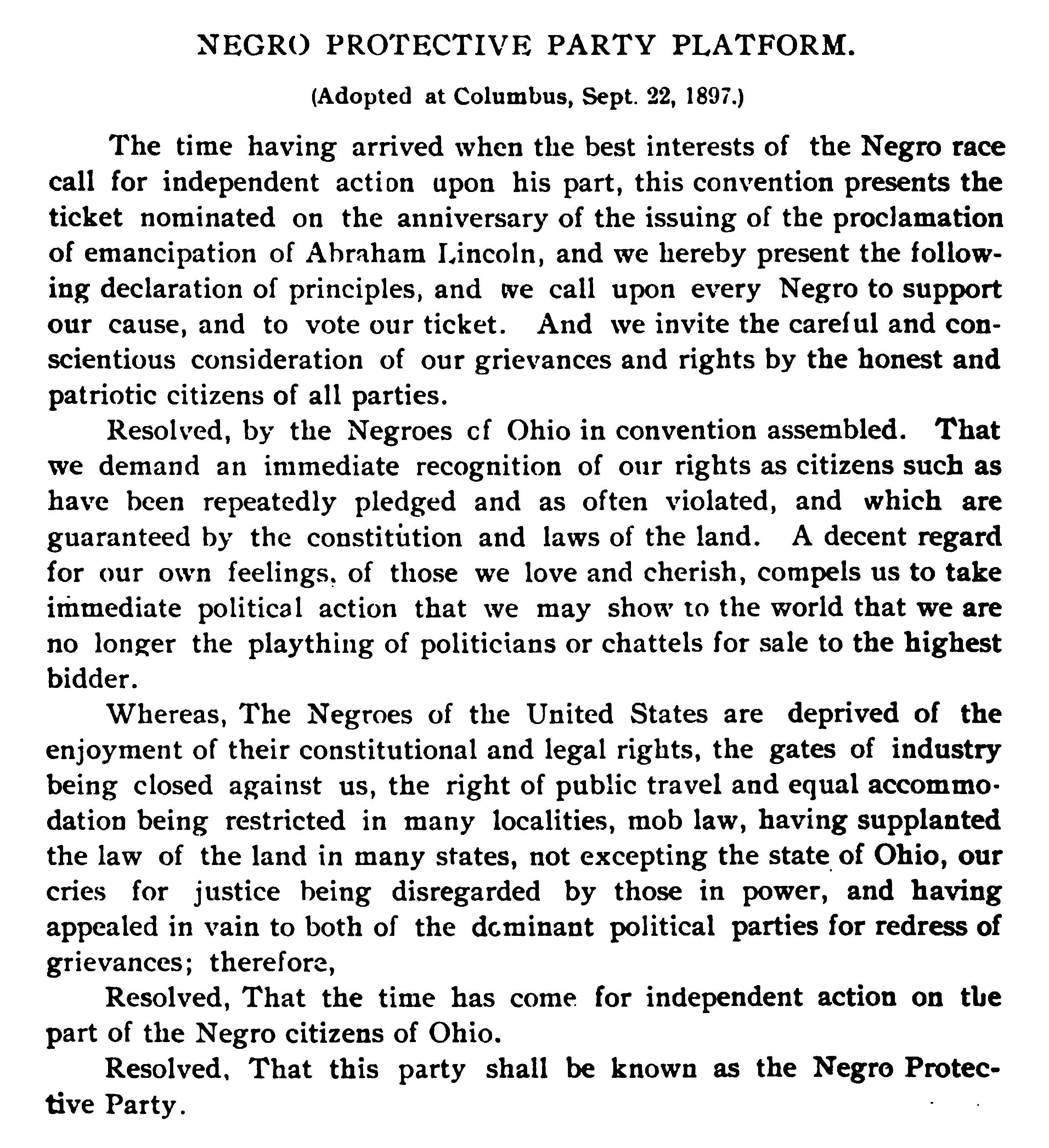
Platform of the Negro Protective Party, Sept. 1897

During the 1890s, Walker became active in politics. Walker's activism was heightened by an incident in June 1897 in which residents of Urbana, Ohio, formed a lynch mob, removed a black man named "Click" Mitchell from the town jail, and publicly killed him by hanging. Believing that Ohio's Republican Governor Asa Bushnell had failed to conduct an appropriate investigation into the lynching, Walker and other African Americans in Ohio left the Republican Party and formed the Negro Protective Party. As a member of the party's Executive Committee, Walker helped organize the party's convention at Columbus, Ohio in September 1897. The party adopted a platform demanding "an immediate recognition of our rights as citizens such as have been repeatedly pledged and as often violated," and declaring an intention "to take immediate political action that we may show to the world that we are no longer the plaything of politicians or chattels for sale to the highest bidder." The party also began publishing "The Negro Protector" as its official organ. When former slave and Republican Party official, Nelson T. Gant, attacked Walker and the Negro Protective Party, Walker responded with an open letter that was published in Ohio newspapers. In the letter, Walker wrote:

Notwithstanding N. T. Gant there are many "intelligent Negroes" who will support the Negro protective ticket and will hurl back at him with contempt his insults to their manhood that they are not free to leave the republican party without being branded as "betrayers of their party" and "ungrateful to their Creator and their race." Such fumings are manifestly the strongest evidence of an enslaved mind ... Republicans ... believe, or make pretense of believing, that the Negro owes eternal allegiance to the G. O. P. no matter what the issue ... We shall not trespass further upon your valuable space, except to say that the Negro Protective party will live and its supporters hope never to regret the stand taken for free and independent manhood as a protest against every disregard, from whatever source, of the rights and privileges of the Negro as an American citizen.

When Ohio's Republican Secretary of State Charles Kinney refused to print the Negro Protective Party's emblem (an image of Abraham Lincoln) on the state ballot, the party filed a mandamus action to compel him to do so. When the party's gubernatorial candidate, S. J. Lewis, received 4,276 votes in the official vote count, The Cleveland Gazette opined that Governor Bushnell's narrow plurality victory was "a direct result of the governor's failure to do his duty during the life of the mob that lynched innocent Afro-American, 'Click" Mitchell, at Urbana."

=== Business interests ===
Even before retiring from baseball, Weldy became active in business. In October 1884, Weldy and a partner went into business operating Delmonico Dining Rooms in Mingo Junction, Ohio, near Steubenville. In 1897, Weldy and Joe Jetters opened an oyster and fish store on North Sixth Street in Steubenville.

The 1890s were a turbulent decade for Weldy's older brother Fleetwood. In 1891, Fleetwood stabbed a man to death outside a saloon, but was acquitted on grounds of self-defense. In 1898, while employed as a railroad postal clerk, Fleetwood was charged with embezzling the contents of registered letters addressed to a dozen different persons and served a year in jail. In 1899, while Fleetwood was still in jail, Weldy began operating the Union Hotel at 105 Market Street in downtown Steubenville. Following Fleetwood's release from jail, the hotel/boarding house was jointly operated by Fleetwood and Weldy. In June 1900, at the time of the 1900 United States census, Walker was living at the Union Hotel with Fleetwood, Fleetwood's second wife Ednah, and their three children. The family also had a live-in servant, Sarah Richmond (age 45). Fleetwood was identified in the 1900 Census as the operator of a boarding house, and Weldy as a "porter". A 1902 city directory listed Fleetwood as the hotel's proprietor and Weldy as the clerk, but a 1904–05 directory listed Weldy as the proprietor and Fleetwood and Ednah as residents. By 1906, Weldy had temporarily relocated several miles downriver to Wheeling, West Virginia, and rumors circulated that the Union Hotel would be sold and turned into "a first class house for the accommodation of Afro-American visitors."

=== Back-to-Africa movement ===
In the 1900s, the Walker brothers became active in the Back-to-Africa movement. In 1902, Fleetwood and Weldy established and edited a black-issues newspaper called The Equator. Six years later, Fleetwood and Weldy published a 47-page book titled Our Home Colony: A Treatise on the Past, Present, and Future of the Negro Race in America. Fleetwood's biographer, David Zang, has written that Fleetwood "was effected by the political vigilance which his younger brother, Weldy, had brought to the black cause." In the credits to Our Home Colony, Fleetwood was identified as the author, and Weldy was identified as "General Agent", though much of the book is written in the first-person plural. In the book, the Walkers wrote: "The only practical and permanent solution of the present and future race troubles in the United States is entire separation by Emigration of the Negro from America." They added: "The Negro race will be a menace and the source of discontent as long as it remains in large numbers in the United States. The time is growing very near when the whites of the United States must either settle this problem by deportation, or else be willing to accept a reign of terror such as the world has never seen in a civilized country."

The Walker brothers also opened an office to begin the work of resettlement to Africa at the time Our Home Colony was published. In his 1908 response to an Oberlin College alumni questionnaire, Weldy listed his occupation as "General Agent" for Our Home Colony and Liberian emigration.

== Later years ==
By 1910, Fleetwood had moved to Cadiz, Ohio, where he operated an 800-seat vaudeville theater. In April 1910, at the time of the 1910 United States census, Weldy was still living at 105 Market Street in Steubenville, and the property was being operated as a boarding house. The proprietor and head of the household was identified as Thomas F. Walker, Weldy's nephew and Fleetwood's son. Weldy was listed as a "waiter".

In January 1920, at the time of the 1920 United States census, Walker was living at 100 Market Street in Steubenville with nephew Thomas and Thomas's wife, Jeanette. Thomas was listed as the "keeper" of the hotel, and Weldy (identified as "Welda") was listed as having no employment. Weldy remained politically active in his later years and was a friend of Harry Clay Smith, the owner and editor of The Cleveland Gazette, the longest-publishing African-American weekly in the United States. After Smith helped the Republican Party elect President Warren Harding in 1920, Weldy sent Smith a congratulatory letter noting that the Negro vote played a role in Harding's victory. Still focused on the practice of lynching in the Southern states, Weldy added: "The North would not have known there had been an election in Florida unless that old game of killing six or more Negroes for wanting to vote had been pulled off. When will 'Uncle Sam' allow the poor southern Negro 'life, liberty and the pursuit of happiness.'"

When Fleetwood died in Cleveland in May 1924, Weldy and Thomas traveled to Cleveland and returned Fleetwood's remains to Steubenville in a casket costing $525. According to Fleetwood biographer, David Zang, Weldy became a bootlegger during Prohibition, and nephew Thomas was a numbers bookie.

In April 1930, at the time of the 1930 United States census, Walker was a "roomer" in an all-black boarding house at 117 South 6th Street in Steubenville operated by Eugene Williams. His occupation was listed as a clerk.

Walker never married. In November 1937, he died from pneumonia at his home in Steubenville.
