= Shahla Lahiji =

Iranian writer and women's rights activist (1942–2024)

Shahla Lahiji (24 April 1942 – 8 January 2024) was an Iranian writer, publisher, translator, women's rights activist, and the director of Roshangaran, a publishing house on women's issues.

== Biography ==
Lahiji completed a degree in sociology at the Open University of London. She established Roshangaran publishing house in 1983, becoming the first female publisher in Iran. As of 2006 Roshangaran published more than 200 titles which are produced by female authors concerning women's issues. The publishing house received the PEN International prize in the United States and the Pandora prize in the United Kingdom in 2001.

Lahiji was one of 19 writers and intellectuals prosecuted for participating in an academic and cultural conference sponsored by the Heinrich Böll Foundation in Berlin on 7–9 April 2000 at which political and social reform in Iran were publicly debated. Before being released on bail in June 2000, Lahiji was kept in Evin Prison where she was interrogated for several months without access to an attorney. Six of the 19 intellectuals charged in connection with the Berlin conference were acquitted, while 11 were sentenced to prison terms ranging from four to fourteen years, however, several of these, such as notable cleric and writer Hasan Yousefi Eshkevari, have since been released. Shahla Lahiji had been sentenced to three years and six months in prison for interfering with national security by attending the conference, plus another six months for spreading propaganda against the Islamic Republic by speaking out about the dangers facing Iranian writers. Her sentence was eventually shortened to six months.

Shahla Lahiji also served as a member of the Violence Against Women Committee in Iran. She died at a hospital in Tehran on 8 January 2024, at the age of 81.

== Books ==
- The Quest for Identity : The Image of Iranian Women in Prehistory and History, co-authored with Mehrangiz Kar, 1992
- Iran Awakening: One Woman's Journey to Reclaim Her Life and Country, co-authored with Azadeh Moaveni, 2007
- Quello che mi spetta by Parinoush Saniee, (Contributor), 2010(first published in 2002) ISBN 978-8-811-66599-1

=== Other publications ===
- Lahiji, Shahla Scarecrow Press, Inc 2013. ISBN 978-0-8108-7086-4

== Honours and awards ==
- 2001 PEN/Barbara Goldsmith Freedom to Write Award
- 2006 IPA Publishers' Freedom Prize

21 September 2006, Geneva (Switzerland) and Göteborg (Sweden) – Iranian publisher Shahla Lahiji will receive the first IPA Publishers' Freedom Prize today at the Göteborg Book Fair's opening ceremony, in recognition of her extraordinary defense and promotion of freedom of expression and freedom to publish in her country and globally. Shahla Lahiji was chosen as the prize-winner by the board of the International Publishers' Association (IPA) from among many deserving candidates nominated by IPA members, independent publishers, and human rights organizations.

== See also ==
- Shirin Ebadi
- Mehrangiz Kar
- Shahla Sherkat
