= Favreau =

Favreau is a surname. Notable people with the surname include:

- Bertrand Favreau (born 1947), French lawyer
- Guy Favreau (1917–1967), Canadian lawyer, politician, and judge
- Jon Favreau (born 1966), American actor, director, producer, and screenwriter
- Jon Favreau (speechwriter) (born 1981), American political commentator
- Karen Favreau (1968–2010), American comic
- Marc Favreau (1929–2005), French Canadian humorist, film actor, and poet
- Réal Favreau, Canadian jurist
- Robert Favreau (born 1948), Canadian film director and film editor
