= Patrick J. Boyle =

Canadian judge

The Honourable Patrick J. Boyle is a former justice of the Tax Court of Canada. He was appointed to the court in 2007 and served until his retirement in 2024. He served as acting associate chief justice following the 2021 retirement of Associate Chief Justice Lucie LaMarre until the December 2023 appointment of Associate Chief Justice Anick Pelletier. He was a member of the court’s Rules Committee and chaired its Judicial Education Committee. In 2014, Justice Boyle was named by Euromoney's ITR International Tax Review as one of the 25 most influential people in the tax world.

== Early life and education ==
Justice Boyle was born in Victoria, B.C., and has lived in Ottawa, Quebec City, Chicago and Washington, D.C. He did his undergraduate studies in chemical engineering at University of Ottawa. He obtained his common Law degree at Osgoode Hall Law School (LL.B./JD 1980), and his Civil Law degree in French at University of Ottawa (LL.L summa cum laude, 2011). He was called to the Bar of Ontario in 1982 after articling at Gowling & Henderson in Ottawa.

== Law practice ==
Boyle was associate and partner at Fraser Milner Casgrain (now Dentons) in Toronto from 1982 to 2007, and seconded to the Federal Departments of Justice and Finance from 2000 to 2002. His tax practice was focused on financial institutions and corporate transactions. He was an accomplished tax litigator and an expert on the regulation of charities in Canada.

Prior to his appointment, he taught advanced tax at University of Windsor Law School, served as special advisor on tax policy to the Department of Finance, and was a member of the Canada Revenue Agency's (CRA) GAAR Committee and its Transfer Pricing Review Committee. Boyle was governor of a university college, and he volunteered in a general counsel role to one of Canada's largest charities. He was on the board of World Vision Canada.

== As judge ==
At the time of his appointment after 25 years of practice, Boyle was vice-chair of the Canadian Bar Association's (CBA) National Tax Law Section, vice-chair of the CBA-CICA Joint Committee on Taxation, and on the editorial board of Wolters Kluwer's CCH Canadian Tax Reporter. He later remarked he found the position much less stressful than being a lawyer.

Justice Boyle has presented at numerous Canadian and international tax conferences, including conferences sponsored by the Canadian Tax Foundation, l’Association de Planification Fiscale et Financière, Tax Executives Institute, CRA, Department of Finance Canada, CBA, International Bar Association and the International Association of Tax Judges (IATJ). He was the Program Chair at the first two Assemblies of the IATJ in 2010 and 2011.

In one judgement, Boyle quoted Oscar Wilde on lying: "If a man is sufficiently unimaginative to produce evidence in support of a lie, he might just as well speak the truth at once". In another, he incorrectly attributed to Monty Python a skit that should have been attributed to Robin Williams.

== Retirement ==
Since his retirement from the Court, the former Justice Boyle is Of Counsel with KPMG Law in its Tax Law and Tax Litigation & Dispute Resolution practices and continues to be actively involved in the Canadian tax community.
