= Zanan (magazine) =

Defunct monthly women's magazine in Iran (1992–2015)

- Cover page of the first issue
- Categories: Women's magazine
- Frequency: Monthly
- Founder: Shahla Sherkat
- Founded: 1992
- Final issue: 2015
- Country: Iran
- Language: fa

Cover photo of 140th issue

Zanan (Persian: زنان, lit. 'Women') was a monthly women's magazine published in Iran. It was the only Persian women's magazine in the country. The magazine ceased publication in 2008, but was relaunched on 29 May 2014. In September 2014, its founder and editor Shahla Sherkat was charged in Iran's Press Court (part of the Islamic Revolutionary Court) for promoting un-Islamic and "obsolete" views and in April 2015, publication of the magazine was again suspended. It promoted women's rights for 16 years and had a total of 152 issues.

== History ==
Zanan was established by Sherkat in 1992 as a monthly magazine.

Zanan focused on the concerns of Iranian women with an Islamic point of view and had intentions of protecting and promoting their rights. However, the monthly magazine tested the political waters with its edgy coverage of reform politics, domestic abuse, and sex. Article topics covered controversial issues from domestic abuse to plastic surgery. It argued that gender equality was Islamic and that religious literature had been misread and misappropriated by misogynists. Mehangiz Kar, Shahla Lahiji, and Shahla Sherkat, the editors of Zanan, led the debate on women's rights and demanded reforms. The leadership did not respond but, for the first time since the revolution, did not silence the movement. One of the major contributors was Hojjat ol-Eslam Seyyed Mohsen Saidzadeh.

In January 2008 the Iranian regime under President Mahmoud Ahmadinejad closed the magazine down for "endangering the spiritual, mental and intellectual health of its readers, and threatening psychological security of the society" claiming it showed women in a "black light."

== Relaunch and suspension ==
In June 2014, Zanan was relaunched by its original founder. The magazine was renamed Zanan-e Emruz (Today's women) with both printed and online editions.

In September, 2014, Sherkat was charged with publishing pictures of women "considered as objects" - a violation of the censorship laws. The magazine itself was suspended in early 2015 after publishing its 10th issue. Iran's Press Oversight Committee stated that the magazine's content was "against public chastity, based on Article 6, Item 2 of the Press Law." The charges against Sherkat and the magazine's suspension were related to publication of a special issue discussing various aspects of cohabitation, dubbed "white marriage" in Iran - a practice that Ayatollah Ali Khamenei has denounced. The special issue had been picked up by international press and the BBC published an article on the Zanan's coverage and the practice itself.

== See also ==
- Zan-e Rooz
