= Don Bowman (judge) =

Canadian judge (1933–2022)

The Honourable Donald George Hugh Bowman Q.C. (1933 – June 8, 2022) was a Chief Justice of the Tax Court of Canada. He was preceded as Chief Justice by Alban Garon and succeeded by Gerald Rip.

== Career ==
Bowman was appointed to the Court in 1991, appointed its Associate Chief Justice in 2000 and its Chief Justice in 2005 until his retirement from the Court in 2008. Bowman's predecessor as Chief Justice was Alban Garon, who was murdered along with his wife and their neighbour by an unsuccessful litigant whose appeal had been dismissed.

Chief Justice Bowman was called to the Bar of Ontario in 1962. He joined the Federal Department of Justice, Tax Litigation Section in 1962 and was appointed its Director in 1968. He was a founder of the Toronto law firm of Stikeman, Elliott, Robarts & Bowman in 1971, now Stikeman Elliott, and was a partner until his appointment to the Tax Court of Canada. He was appointed Queen's Counsel in 1974 and was admitted to the New York Bar in 1982. Following his retirement from the Court, he returned to private practice at Fraser Milner Casgrain, now Dentons.

As a judge he presided in both English and French appeals and issued judgments in both languages. He was known to write his reasons in longhand with a wooden fountain pen. His deeply thoughtful intellect and creative flair were evident in them all. Many of his judgments are still frequently cited and are appreciated as much for their clarity and depth of analysis as for their uniquely "Bowmanesque" readability. Although humble about his accomplishments, he was often described as the Lord Denning of the Canadian Tax Court as he transformed the tax law with wit, wisdom, and plain-spoken practical insight into the tax law and its broader legal context. He was also fluent in German, and as an example of his writing style, in his very last judgment from the Court, in expressing his lack of support for the Canada Revenue Agency’s position, he inserted a line from the Friedrich Schiller play The Maid of Orleans in its original German that translates as “Against stupidity, the gods themselves battle in vain” – leaving it for mere tax mortals reading his decision to look up the English translation for themselves.

== Retirement ==
Following his retirement, the Canadian Tax Foundation published a special issue of its Canadian Tax Journal to commemorate Chief Justice Bowman's significant contributions to Canadian tax as his career engaged every major function in the Canadian tax realm. Canada's national tax law competitive moot for law school students, The Donald G.H. Bowman National Tax Moot, was launched in 2011 by Timothy Fitzsimmons and Dr. Emir Crowne and named in his honour.
