= Hirschfield =

Hirschfield is a surname. Notable people with the surname include:

- Alan Hirschfield (1935–2015), American film studio executive and philanthropist
- Brad Hirschfield (born 1963), American Orthodox rabbi
- Jeffrey Hirschfield, Canadian television writer
- Leo Hirschfield (1868-1922), Austrian-American candy maker
- Magnus Hirschfeld (1868–1935), German physician and sexologist
- Trevor Hirschfield (born 1983), wheelchair rugby player

== See also ==
- Hirschfeld (disambiguation)
- Hirshfield (surname)
- Hershfield (surname)
