= Anick Pelletier =

Anick Pelletier is the Associate Chief Justice of the Tax Court of Canada.

Upon being called to the Bar of Quebec in 1993, Pelletier began working as a litigator with the Department of Justice eventually serving as Assistant Deputy Minister with their Tax Law Services Portfolio until her 2022 appointment to the Tax Court to replace the retired Lucie Lamarre.
