= Iran After the Elections conference =

Conference in Berlin about future political conditions of Iran

Iran After the Elections
- Poster of the event
- Native name: Iran nach den Wahlen
- Date: 7–9 April 2000
- Venue: Haus der Kulturen der Welt
- Location: Berlin, Germany
- Also known as: Berlin Conference
- Type: Panel discussion
- Organised by: Heinrich Böll Foundation

Iran After the Parliamentary Elections: The Dynamic of Reforms in the Islamic Republic (German: Iran nach den Parlamentswahlen: Die Reformdynamik in der Islamischen Republik; commonly known as the Berlin Conference in Iran) was a three-day conference about the future of Iran after the landslide victory of the reformists in 2000 legislative election, organized by the Heinrich Böll Foundation and held in Berlin in April 2000. The conference was less notable for its proceedings than for its disruption by anti-regime Iranian exiles, and for the long prison sentences given to several participants upon their return to Iran.

== The conference ==
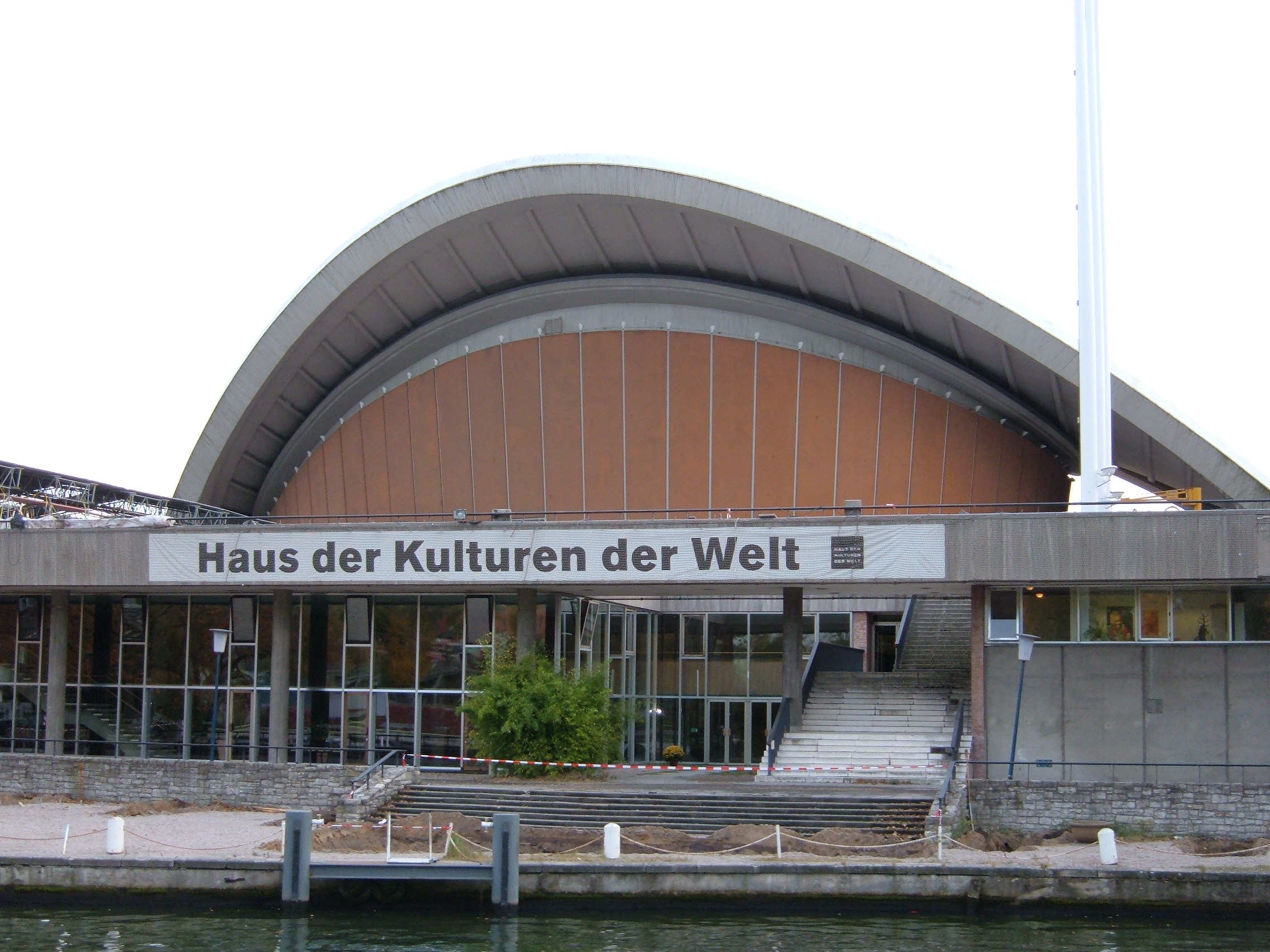
Venue of the event

The conference was held by the Heinrich Boll Institute, "an independent German cultural organisation close to the Green Party," in the wake of a sweeping victory by reformist candidates in the Majlis elections of February 2000, It was attended not only by "reformist intellectuals" from Iran, but also by "banned and exiled Iranian political activists." Unfortunately, the organizers did not anticipate the large political gap between the exiles and the more conservative Iranian reformists.

On the second day of the conference, hundreds of Iranian exiles stormed the Haus Der Kulturen Der Welt (House of World Cultures) and "staged protests both against the participants and the political situation in Iran." Shouts of "death to the Islamic Republic" and "Mercenaries, go home" prevented the participants from speaking, while according to anti-regime Iran Press Service, "a girl appeared on the main tribune and stripped to almost her last piece except for an Islamic scarf, and later a man climbed on a chair and fully undressed, exhibiting pictures of the clerical leaders of the regime" for the benefit of television viewers in Iran where the conference was being televised. The BBC also reported the protesters "included a man removing his clothes and a woman dancing with bare arms."

Hardline elements in Iran were infuriated by the broadcast of the protests, and following the conference "at least ten" Iranian participants were arrested, tried and sentenced to several years in prison after their return to Iran for crimes such as "insulting the former Leader of the Islamic Republic of Iran, Ayatollah Khomeini, and disseminating propaganda against the Islamic system."

=== Panelists ===
Speakers of the conference had different backgrounds and belonged to a wide range of political groups. The panel included intellectuals and activists with reformist, nationalist-religious and secular leanings, namely:

- Ali Afshari, student leader (affiliated with the OSU)
- Hamidreza Jalaeipour, sociologist and journalist (affiliated with the IIPF)
- Mahmoud Dowlatabadi, writer and novelist (secular)
- Mehrangiz Kar, lawyer and human rights activist (secular feminist)
- Jamileh Kadivar, recently elected MP for Tehran (reformist)
- Mohammad-Ali Sepanlou, literary critic and poet (secular)
- Changiz Pahlevan, writer and scholar of cultural studies (secular)
- Ezzatollah Sahabi, former MP and director of Iran-e-Farda (nationalist-religious)
- Shahla Lahiji, publisher and women's rights activist
- Alireza Alavitabar, political scientist and journalist (affiliated with the IIPF)
- Kazem Kardevani, sociologist and writer (secular)
- Shahla Sherkat, director of Zanan and women's rights activist (Islamic feminist)
- Fariborz Raisdana, economist (secular)
- Moniro Ravanipour, writer (secular)
- Khadijeh Moghadam, conservationist and women's rights activist
- Akbar Ganji, journalist and columnist (reformist)
- Hasan Yousefi Eshkevari, cleric and former MP (nationalist-religious)

Chair of the panel on the first day was Ahmad Taheri.

=== Disruptions ===
Among the attendees were members of two political organizations of Iranian exiled dissidents, the Worker-communist Party of Iran (WCP) and the Berlin Exiled Women of Iran Against Fundamentalism (BEWIAF), who had schemed to disrupt the conference. On the first day, they tried to prevent the conference from starting by chanting slogans such as "Death to the Islamic Republic" and "Akhund (cleric) get lost!", the latter referring to Hasan Yousefi Eshkevari who was going to speak. When some other in the audience attempted to stop the chanting members of the WCP and the BEWIAF, a brawl occurred between the two parties and police was called up to the venue, leading to escort of BEWIAF leader Shadi Amin outside. The organizers agreed to announce a one-minute silence "in memory of the thousands of victims of the Islamic Republic" before starting the conference, which BEWIAF had asked.

The second day started with more interruptions, when WCP protested that they have not given a voice in the conference. The organizers gave Mina Ahadi of the WCP fifteen minutes to talk at the rostrum, but it soon became evident that they were interested only in disrupting the meeting. Ahadi said they will "disrupt anyone who defended Khatami" and are only willing to "who had not been among the leaders of the Islamic Republic", and then started chanting "Death to the Islamic Republic" followed by some in the crowd. Some of the speakers were unable to fully deliver their speeches as a result of constant disruptions.

On the third day, the organizers did not allow members of the WCP and BEWIAF into the building of the conference. Entry cards were issued for the rest of participants and the speeches were made without disruptions.

== Aftermath ==
=== Prison sentences for participants ===
Among those sentenced were:

- Saeed Sadr, a translator at the German embassy, was originally accused of 'waging war on God' (Moharebeh), a capital crime in Iran by the prosecution. In the end he was sentenced to 10 years in prison.
- Khalil Rostamkhani, a journalist with the Daily News and Iran Echo and director of a translation company, was sentenced to nine years in prison. He appeared before Teheran's Revolutionary Court on 9 November 2000. The prosecutor sought the death penalty and accused him of being a "mohareb" (fighter against god), of having "received and distributed leaflets and press releases from opposition groups based abroad and of having participated in the organisation of the Berlin conference, which posed a threat to the country's security." Rostamkhani helped organise the conference, but did not attend it.
- Ezzatollah Sahabi, was managing editor of the now-banned journal Iran-e Farda (The Iran of Tomorrow. On 13 January 2001, the Islamic Revolutionary Court of Tehran sentenced him to four and a half years’ imprisonment.
- Ali Afshari, a well-known Iranian student leader, was sentenced to five years. After being released from prison on bail in 2002, he publicly apologized "to the Iranian people" for confessing to a "lie about his plot to overthrow the IRI and other allegations," and for not being unable to withstand torture he said was used to force his confession.
- Mehrangiz Kar a feminist lawyer, was given four years, reportedly for "acting against national security by participating in the Berlin Conference, and by disseminating propaganda against the Islamic Republic of Iran."
- Shahla Lahiji a feminist publisher, was given four years also reportedly for "acting against national security by participating in the Berlin Conference, and by disseminating propaganda against the Islamic Republic of Iran."
- Akbar Ganji, celebrated Islamic revolutionary turned investigative journalist, and editor of Fath (Victory) newspaper, was sentenced to 10 years' imprisonment, to be followed by five years in exile (later reduced to six years imprisonment and no exile) for "retaining classified documents from the Culture and Islamic Guidance Ministry, insulting the former Leader of the Islamic Republic of Iran, Ayatollah Khomeini, and disseminating propaganda against the Islamic system." His prison time was marked by hunger strike and dramatic courtroom display of torture marks.
- Shahla Sherkat, founder and publisher of Zanan (Women) magazine, was sentenced to four months in jail and two million tomans in fines.
- Hassan Yousefi Eshkevari, a religious scholar and journalist with Neshat and Iran-é-Farda, was imprisoned upon his return in August and tried before a Special Court for the Clergy beginning in October. He was originally charged with apostasy, a capital offense, but was sentenced to seven years and serving four years.

=== Protest of sentences ===
The German foreign minister Joschka Fischer expressed his "profound concern" over the sentences to the Iranian ambassador. Human rights groups campaigned against the sentences.

The imprisonments were thought to have been part of an anti-freedom-of-expression clampdown by hardliners directed against reformers. The Amnesty International delivered a statement on the prosecution:

"In April 2000 around 20 newspapers were closed by the Press Court. Also, other journalists including Mashallah Shamsolvaezin, Emadeddin Baqi and publisher Hojjatoleslam Abdollah Nouri have been imprisoned in connection with newspaper articles they have published."

=== Criticism of the conference ===
The Iranian judiciary, which is often described as dominated by anti-reformist "conservatives," condemned the Conference as "organised by the 'Zionists' who control Germany’s Green Party to which is affiliated the Heinrich Böll Institute" that organised the conference. However, conference attendee and political prisoner Akbar Ganji has cast doubt on this charge, pointing out that Iranians could not go to the conference without the authorities permission, and that the authorities themselves had received the leader of the allegedly Zionist-controlled Green Party, Joschka Fischer.

If the

Intelligence Ministry, the Judiciary, the authorities knew that the organisers were Zionist and let us go to Berlin attend the meeting, they have then encouraged us to commit an offence

and asking why

officials can talk to Zionists and not ordinary citizen? How come that out intellectuals and scholars and sportsmen can exchange with the Americans with who we have no relations but not with German counterparts?

Others more sympathetic to the reform movement, such as Iran Press Service, have described the conference as "a good idea that backfired." The Service complained that organizers Thomas Hartman, Mehdi Ja'fari-Gorzini, Bahman Nuroumand "were unaware of the weight, importance and complexities of the task," and lacked "any experience or skill for such a highly sensitive and touchy diplomatic performance."

Visiting Iranians were "visibly shocked" at the un-Islamic irreverence and ridicule of the protestors, while the expatriates were "astounded by the low level of general knowledge, the lack of sophistication, low degree of education" of visiting Iranians, such as the newly elected MP Mrs. Jamileh Kadivar.

== See also ==
- Human rights in Islamic Republic of Iran
- Freedom of speech in Iran
- Judicial system of Iran
