= Marina and Viktor Kalashnikov =

Russian historian and freelance journalist

Marina Kalashnikova (died 3 August 2013) was a Russian historian and freelance journalist. In 2010 she and her ex-KGB agent husband Viktor Kalashnikov (Russian: Виктор Калашников) were treated in hospital in Germany for mercury poisoning in what they have said was an attempt on their life by Russia's FSB, the successor to the KGB. The case has been compared to the alleged poisoning and murder of Russian dissident Alexander Litvinenko. Marina died of cancer in Moscow in 2013. Viktor is a distant relative of Mikhail Kalashnikov, the inventor of the AK-47.

== Career ==
Viktor joined the KGB, rising to the rank of colonel. He was stationed in Brussels and Vienna, studying Stasi files and information about Western spies working for Moscow In 1992, while on assignment abroad, he informed his superiors of corruption in the service and was called back to Moscow. He was assigned different tasks. He left the service in 1992. Regarding his relationship with his ex-colleagues, Kalashnikov stated: "It's like a brotherhood. If you turn away from them, if you don't agree with them, it causes offence. This feeling of being offended causes a desire to punish, to take revenge." After leaving the KGB, Viktor Kalashnikov worked as a research director in Boris Yeltsin’s presidential administration. Later, he worked for oil companies. Viktor started to work as a freelance journalist and particularly criticized the Russian military campaign Chechnya. Kalashnikov also had accused the FSB, the successor to the KGB, of colluding with Islamist groups.

== Activities ==
Marina and Viktor had been publishing articles critical of the Russian Government since the 1990s. They left Russia and have lived in various countries, such as Ukraine, Poland, Estonia and now Germany. They claim to have been warned to cease their activities at various points in the 1990s and 2000s by KGB agents.

=== Views ===
Marina considers Russia to be ruled in an anti-democratic way: "It is clear that the [Kremlin] regime has no restraint and will commit any crime, break any rule, surpass any benchmark in order to consolidate its already illegitimate power". She has also criticised Western analysts for thinking that conflict with Russia can be avoided. In August 2009 she stated, "The West does not care to wake from the dream of its wishful thinking, even when Moscow turns to [...] reanimating Joseph Stalin’s cult of personality together with the ideology of the Cheka."

She also accuses Russia of trying to expand its influence around the world: "The Kremlin has activated a network of extremists in the Third World [...] Russia has managed to shake off nearly all international conventions restricting the expansion of its military power."

In the view of writer Jeffrey R. Nyquist, these kinds of views have made Marina a target: "When Marina Kalashnikova presented her analysis to Russian and Ukrainian readers on August 26, 2008, she annoyed the regime and made herself a target of the Russian secret police. Her Moscow residence was broken into. Private papers were stolen. Threats were made. And last, but not least, she was forcibly incarcerated in a psychiatric clinic for 35 days. 'I am completely healthy,' Marina told me during a telephone interview on Sunday. 'It was absolutely political … and not medical at all.'" Kalashnikova said that the authorities justified her detention as being because she had been "aggressive".

== Poisoning ==
In November 2010, it was reported that the doctors at Berlin's Charité hospital had discovered that Viktor, who had been losing weight significantly, had 53.7 microgrammes of mercury per litre of blood, while Marina had even more - 56 microgrammes (the safe level is between one and three microgrammes). Viktor told the press that "Moscow poisoned us".

The case was compared with that of another former Russian security officer, Alexander Litvinenko, who was murdered in London in 2006; he is believed to have been administered a radioactive polonium isotope. The Kalashnikovs claimed that they were poisoned in hotels and private residences in Estonia, Ukraine, Poland, Russia and Germany.

On December 28, 2010, The Times reported that its journalistic investigation had led to a preliminary criminal inquiry being opened in Berlin, which was announced on December 27, 2010.

Later, German prosecutors have dropped an investigation. Spokesman for the state prosecutor's office in Berlin told the AFP news agency: "There is no evidence that they were poisoned, at least in Germany."

== See also ==
- Karinna Moskalenko – lawyer who claims to have been poisoned with mercury by the Russian authorities
