= Hershfield =

Hershfield is a surname. Notable people with the surname include:

- Charles Hershfield (1910–1990), Canadian civil engineer
- Harry Hershfield (1885–1974), American cartoonist, writer and radio personality
- Joanne Hershfield (born 1950), American writer and filmmaker
- Joe E. Hershfield, Canadian judge
- Leo Hershfield (1904–1979), American illustrator, cartoonist and courtroom artist
