= Campbell Miller =

Campbell Miller may refer to:

- Stretch Miller (Campbell A. Miller, 1910–1972), American sportscaster
- Campbell J. Miller, Canadian judge
