= Terrence O'Connor =

Canadian judge

Terrence O'Connor is a judge who served on the Tax Court of Canada.
