= Aktham Naisse =

Syrian lawyer and human rights activist (1951–2022)

Aktham Naisse (Arabic: أكثم نعيسة; 28 December 1951 - 5 February 2022) was a Syrian lawyer and human rights activist, president of the Committees for the Defence of Democratic Liberties and Human Rights (CDDL-HR), which he helped found in 1989.

== Life ==
Born in Latakia, Syria, Aktham Naisse studied in Egypt before returning to Syria. He was first arrested in February 1982, when he was held for four months and tortured. In 1989 the CDDL-HR formed an underground publication, Sawt al-Dimuqratiyya (The voice of democracy). In 1991 the group called for free elections, leading to Naisse's arrest in December 1991. In 1992 he was tried and sentenced to 9 years imprisonment in Sednaya prison. Released in July 1998, Naisse was not subsequently permitted to practice law.

After Bashar al-Assad came to power, the CDDL-HR issued a public declaration on 10 December 2000. In August 2003 Naisse was questioned and threatened by military security. The committee posted a public letter on the Internet, calling for the lifting of the state of emergency. On 8 March 2004 they led around 700 demonstrators in a peaceful sit-in in front of the Syrian parliament building in Damascus. Naisse and one hundred others presented the parliament with a petition against the state of emergency, signed by over 7,000 people.

On 13 April 2004 Naisse was arrested and returned to Sednaya prison. There he suffered a stroke, leaving him partially paralysed. He began a hunger strike, and was released on bail pending trial on 16 August 2004. After international appeals on his behalf, the court acquitted him on 26 June 2005.

== Awards ==
Naisse won the ninth Ludovic-Trarieux International Human Rights Award in Brussels in October 2004. He won the 2005 Martin Ennals Award for Human Rights Defenders.
