= Steven K. D'Arcy =

Canadian jurist

Judge of the Tax Court of Canada
- In office April 29, 2009 – 2024

Personal details
- Born: Saint John, New Brunswick
- Education: Dalhousie University

Steven K. D'Arcy is a retired attorney, who from 2009 to 2024, was a judge in the Tax Court of Canada. Prior to his appointment, he was a recognized attorney on international tax issues.
