= Robert Hogan (judge) =

Canadian judge

Robert Hogan is a judge currently serving on the Tax Court of Canada. He took office on March 3, 2008. On May 6, 2023, he elected to become a supernumerary judge.
