= Andrew Meldrum =

American journalist (born 1951)

Andrew Meldrum (born 1951) is an American journalist who has concentrated on Africa and human rights. He worked in Zimbabwe for 23 years. Currently Meldrum is Global Weekend Editor for The Associated Press, working in New York. Previously he was AP's Africa News Editor, based in Johannesburg, South Africa. He was a correspondent for The Economist and The Guardian in Zimbabwe from 1980 to May 18, 2003 before being expelled by the Zimbabwean government because the government objected to his reports exposing state torture.

== Biography ==
Meldrum attended high school at Western Reserve Academy in Hudson, Ohio, graduating in 1970. He then studied history at Middlebury College and got a Master's degree from Columbia University School of Journalism in 1977.

In 2004 Meldrum won the Schork Award for "courageous international journalism" from Columbia University. In his career and stay in Zimbabwe, he wrote a book Where We Have Hope: A Memoir of Zimbabwe which describes Zimbabwean events during his 23 years stay.

He was at Harvard University as a Nieman Fellow in the 2007/2008 academic year where his research focused on the role of the press in Zimbabwe and South Africa.

From 2008 to 2013 he taught journalism courses at Harvard Summer School and Harvard Extension School, including advising students on Harvard Extension's Masters in Journalism programme.

== Arrest and expulsion ==
In May 2002, Meldrum was briefly jailed after the Zimbabwean government charged him with violating a statute against "publishing a falsehood" for reporting a man's claims that his wife was decapitated by Mugabe supporters (Zanu-PF) in front of her two young children. It later became evident that the man had fabricated the decapitation story. Meldrum's trial lasted two months and he could have faced two years in jail. He was defended by Zimbabwean lawyer Beatrice Mtetwa. Meldrum was acquitted and the magistrate ruled that he had acted as a responsible journalist, only to receive a deportation order. In a second legal case, a judge ruled that Meldrum, as the holder of a permit of permanent residence, had the legal right to stay and work in the country.

Meldrum continued his work and exposed how a member of the opposition Movement for Democratic Change was beaten in police custody and later died. On May 18, 2003, Meldrum was abducted by Zimbabwean authorities and illegally expelled from Zimbabwe to South Africa where he continued to write for The Guardian on Zimbabwe and events in southern Africa. His lawyer, Beatrice Mtetwa, had obtained court orders allowing him to remain in the country but he was abducted by police and detained before being forcibly expelled from Zimbabwe.

== Bibliography ==
- Where We Have Hope: A Memoir of Zimbabwe - ISBN 0-87113-896-4
- Zimbabwe's battle for press freedom – An article from: World Literature Today
