= Bertrand Favreau =

French lawyer

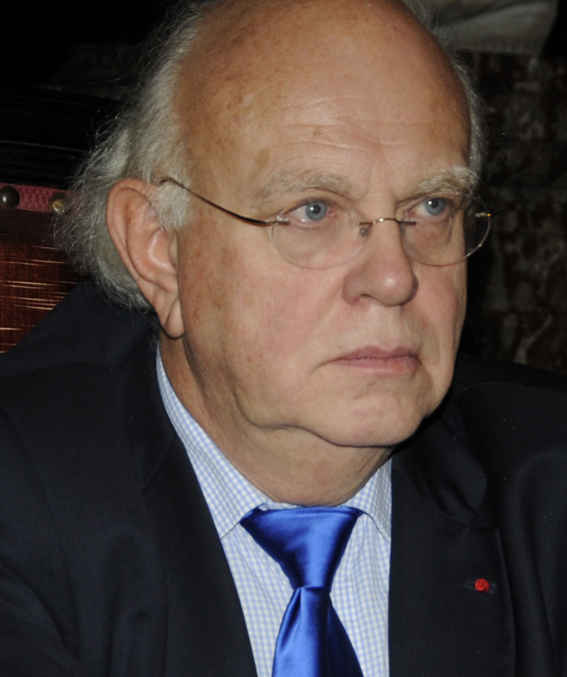
Bertrand Favreau

Bertrand Favreau is a French lawyer born in Bordeaux in 1947.

He is the founding president of the Bordeaux Bar Institute for Human Rights (IDHBB) and also the Chairman of The Ludovic-Trarieux International Human Rights Prize. In 1986, he was the founding president of the European Lawyers Union and then became Honorary President, he was also the president of Human Rights Institute of European Lawyers in Luxembourg. since 1989. Chairman of the European Bar Human Rights Institute (IDHAE).

== Publications ==
- Georges Mandel ou La passion de la République 1885-1944, 568 p. Fayard (1996) Collection "Pour une histoire du XXe siècle" ISBN 2-213-59441-4
- Derrière la cause isolée d'un homme, Editions de la Presqu'île, 1996.
- Le droit, la justice, l'humanité. Derrière la cause isolée d'un homme 2, Editions du Passant, 2001.
- Le bien sorti du mal, Éditions Le Bord de l'eau, 2008.
- Promenade européenne dans Bordeaux, MEBA, 2012.

== In participation ==
- Les Girondins, sous la direction de François Furet et Mona Ozouf, Payot, 1991.
- Enlarging the Fight against Fraud in the European Union: Penal and Administrative Sanctions, Settlement, Whistleblowing and Corpus Juris in the Candidate Countries, edited by Peter Cullen, 2004, ISBN 3-89817-365-8
- Le Droit de l’homme à un environnement sain, in Annuaire International des Droits de l’Homme, Sakkoulas/Bruylant, Athènes-Bruxelles, 2006.
- Droit de l’eau, droit de l’homme, Patrimoine et Estuaires, Éditions Confluences, 2006.
- Handicap et protection du droit européen et communautaire. Entre droit européen et droits internes, Bruylant, 2006.
- Dreyfus réhabilité, cent ans après - Antisémitisme : il y a cent ans, et aujourd'hui..., (dir) Éditions Le Bord de l'eau, 2007.
- L'Avocat dans le droit européen, (dir) Bruylant, 2008.
- Per un rilancio del progetto europeo. Esigenze di tutela degli interessi comunitari e nuove strategie di integrazione penale, Giuffrè, 2009.
- La loi peut-elle dire l'histoire ? Droit, Justice et Histoire, Bruylant, 20012.
