= Shahla Sherkat =

Iranian activist

- Born: March 30, 1956 (age 70); Isfahan, Iran
- Education: University of Tehran (BA); Allameh Tabataba'i University (MA)
- Occupations: writer, publisher, journalist

Shahla Sherkat (Persian: شهلا شرکت; born March 30, 1956) is an Iranian journalist, publisher, author, feminist, and women's rights activist. She is a Persian and one of the pioneers of the women's rights movement in Iran.

== Biography ==
Sherkat was born in 1956 in Isfahan, Iran, and moved to Tehran with her family at age 11. She holds a bachelor's degree in clinical psychology from the University of Tehran and a master's degree in women's studies from Allameh Tabataba'i University. She also holds a certificate in journalism from the Keyhan Institute in Tehran.

Sherkat began her journalism career in 1979 as a reporter and assistant editor at Pooyandegan-e Rah-e Zeynab, a government-owned women's weekly edited by Zahra Rahnavard. From 1980 to 1982, she worked in the publishing department of Kanoon-e Parvaresh Fekri. She then became editor of Zan-e Emruz (Today's Woman), a women's magazine the state had taken over after the 1979 revolution; its content became more feminist during her roughly 10 years there. Sherkat has written that she was fired after being accused of promoting "modernist, Westernized and feminist tendencies". In 1987, she was summoned to court over a story about a girl who was beaten and arrested by police at a Caspian Sea beach for not fully covering her hair; she was later exonerated.

In 1992, Sherkat founded the monthly women's magazine Zanan (Women). Sherkat has said she started it because mainstream journalism ignored women's rights; according to the IWMF, it was the first independent journal focused on women's issues after the revolution. The magazine covered subjects widely considered taboo in Iran, including divorce law, prostitution, HIV/AIDS, domestic abuse and child custody. Its offices were repeatedly attacked by vigilantes in the early and mid-1990s, and police declined to act on her complaints. She was often summoned to the Press Court over articles the magazine published, including a piece by Shirin Ebadi and a series on Islamic law and women by Mehrangiz Kar and the cleric Mohsen Saidzadeh; those charges were eventually dropped.

In January 2001, Tehran's Revolutionary Court fined Sherkat and sentenced her to four months in prison on charges of anti-Islamic activities for attending a conference in Berlin organized by the Heinrich Böll Foundation, where she had argued that Islamic dress should be encouraged rather than compulsory. On appeal, she was not required to serve the prison term but paid a fine equivalent to two months' salary.

In 2008, during Mahmoud Ahmadinejad's presidency, Iran's Press Supervisory Board revoked the magazine's license after 16 years, accusing it of presenting a bleak picture of the Islamic Republic and of Iranian women's lives, and of publishing morally questionable material. She wrote in 2009 that after a year without work, she had taken a management job at an arts and cultural institute. After Hassan Rouhani was elected president in 2013, Sherkat received a permit for a new monthly, Zanan-e Emruz (Women of Today; also transliterated Zanan-e Emrooz or Zanan-e Emrouz), whose first issue appeared on May 28, 2014. Its first issue included an interview with Jhumpa Lahiri, a critique of mehrieh (a payment a wife may claim from her husband, including on divorce) and an article on restrictions on women's studies in Iranian universities. Conservative media criticized the government for licensing what they called a continuation of Zanan; state television questioned granting Sherkat a permit given her background, and the hardline daily Kayhan accused her of working with groups opposed to the Islamic Republic. On April 27, 2015, after 11 issues, the Ministry of Culture and Islamic Guidance ordered the magazine closed following a series of articles on unregistered cohabitation, known in Iran as "white marriage", which authorities said violated public morality.

== Honours and awards ==
- 2005 Louis M. Lyons Award for Conscience and Integrity in Journalism, Nieman Foundation for Journalism at Harvard University
- 2005 Courage in Journalism Award, International Women's Media Foundation (IWMF), its first recipient from Iran
- 2007 One of five prominent journalists of the year, Association of Iranian Journalists

== See also ==
- Women's rights movement in Iran
- List of Muslim feminists
