= Valerie Miller =

Tax Court of Canada
- Incumbent
- Assumed office April 2, 2007

Valerie Miller is a judge currently serving on the Tax Court of Canada.
