= Hirshfield =

Hirshfield is a surname. Notable people with the surname include:

- Al Hirschfeld (1903–2003), American caricaturist
- Desmond Hirshfield, Baron Hirshfield (1913–1993), British accountant and life peer
- James Hirshfield (1902–1993), Assistant Commandant of the U.S. Coast Guard
- Jane Hirshfield (born 1953), American poet and writer
- Jeff Hirshfield (born 1955), American jazz drummer
- Leo Hirshfield (died 1922), inventor of the Tootsie Roll

== See also ==
- Hirschfield (surname)
