= Eric A. Bowie =

Canadian judge (1936–2019)

Eric Anthony Bowie

Tax Court of Canada
- Incumbent
- Assumed office 1995

Personal details
- Born: November 12th, 1936 Glasgow, Scotland, United Kingdom
- Died: July 1st, 2019 Ottawa, Ontario, Canada
- Education: University of New Brunswick

Eric Anthony Bowie was a judge who served on the Tax Court of Canada.
