= Hirschfeld =

Hirschfeld may refer to:

== People ==
- Leopold Hirschfeld (1798–1893), Hungarian businessman, brewer
- Abraham Hirschfeld (1919–2005), Polish-born New York real estate developer
- Al Hirschfeld (1903–2003), American caricaturist
  - Al Hirschfeld Theatre, in Manhattan
- Alexa Hirschfeld, American entrepreneur
- Emil Hirschfeld (1903–1968), German athlete
- Ernst-Erich Hirschfeld (1918–1944), German Luftwaffe fighter pilot
- Gerhard Hirschfeld (born 1946), German historian
- James Hirschfeld (chief executive), American entrepreneur
- James William Peter Hirschfeld (born 1940), British mathematician
- Jimmy Hirschfeld (born 1929), American television director and producer
- Lars Hirschfeld (born 1978), Canadian football goalkeeper
- Ludwik Hirszfeld (Ludwig Hirschfeld, 1884–1954), Polish physician and immunologist
- Magnus Hirschfeld (1868–1935), German physician, sexologist, and gay rights advocate
  - Magnus Hirschfeld Medal, for outstanding service to sexual science
- Moritz von Hirschfeld (1791–1859), Prussian general
- Otto Hirschfeld (1843–1922), German epigraphist and professor of ancient history
- Otto Hirschfeld (physician) (1898–1957), Australian medical practitioner, academic and university chancellor
- Robert Hirschfeld (1942–2009), American actor and author
- Wilson Hirschfeld (1916–1974), American journalist
- Emil Kio (1894–1965), Russian magician, born Emil Hirschfeld-Renard
- Rachel Hirschfeld (attorney), an attorney in the area of pet trust law
- Yizhar Hirschfeld (1950–2006), Israeli archaeologist
- Ephraim Joseph Hirschfeld (1758-1820), German-Jewish mystic

== Places in Germany ==
- Hirschfeld, Brandenburg, in the Elbe-Elster district, Brandenburg
- Hirschfeld, Rhineland-Palatinate, in the Rhein-Hunsrück district, Rhineland-Palatinate
- Hirschfeld, Saxony, in the Zwickauer Land district, Saxony
- Hirschfeld, Thuringia, in the district of Greiz, Thuringia

== Other uses ==
- Hirschfeld Eddy Foundation for the Human Rights of Lesbians, Gays, Bisexuals and Transgender People

== See also ==
- Hirschfield, a surname
