= Gerald J. Rip =

Canadian judge

Chief Justice, Tax Court of Canada
- In office July 15, 2008 – December 11, 2014
- Appointed by: Stephen Harper
- Preceded by: Donald G.H. Bowman
- Succeeded by: Eugene Rossiter

Personal details
- Born: 1940 Montreal
- Education: Sir George Williams University; 1962 Bachelor of Arts; University of Montreal; 1965 Bachelor of Law

Gerald J. Rip is a former judge and Chief Justice of the Tax Court of Canada.

== Life ==
Born to Harry and Pauline Rip in 1940, Rip was a 1958 graduate of Outremont High School. His son is an Ontario lawyer.

In May 2007, he spoke at the Canadian Petroleum Tax Society's conference, and in June 2009, he was the opening speaker at the Canadian Tax Foundation's Toronto conference.

== Term as a lawyer ==
Rip was called to the Bar of Quebec in 1966, and was named Special Assistant to the Minister of Justice Pierre Elliott Trudeau the following year. He joined the Department of Justice and focused on tax litigation until 1972.

In 1973, Rip was admitted to the Law Society of Upper Canada, and joined Soloway, Wright, Houston & Associates in Ottawa, where he remained until his July 1983 appointment to the Tax Court.

== Term as a judge ==
Rip was appointed Associate Chief Justice of the Tax Court in September 2006, and was named Chief Justice on July 15, 2008. The appointment, by Stephen Harper, saw Rip replace Donald G.H. Bowman, and Rip's own role was filled by Eugene Rossiter. When his official portrait, painted by Cyril Leeper, was unveiled in the Supreme Court of Canada's Great Hall, Chief Justice Beverley McLachlin commissioned the same artist to paint her own portrait.

In his 2009 judgment in the suit Leola Purdy, Sons Ltd. v The Queen, he quoted Ralph Waldo Emerson in suggesting that "A foolish consistency is the hobgoblin of little minds". In a 2015 decision involving a tax shelter claim he expressed shock at the Crown's sworn filings in the proceeding, compared them to 1950's McCarthyism and awarded solicitor client costs to the taxpayer.
