= Beatrice Mtetwa =

Zimbabwean human rights lawyer (born 1957)

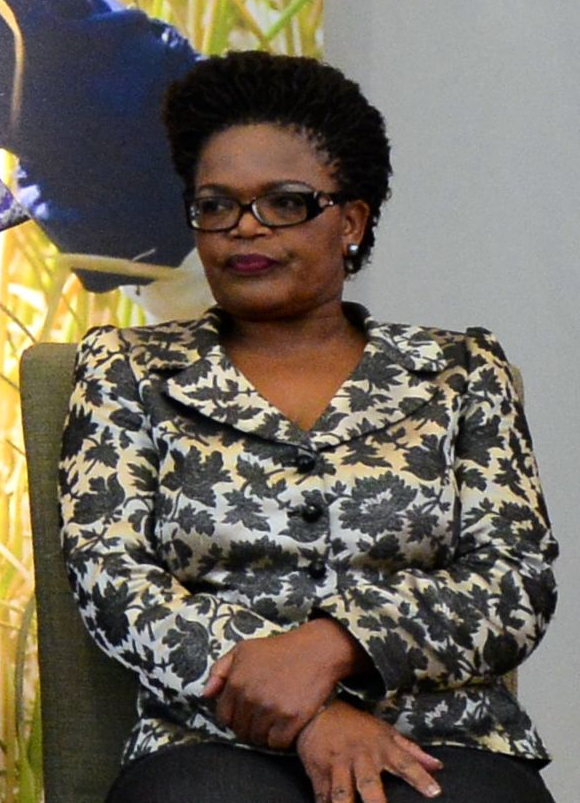
- Mtetwa in 2014
- Born: 1957 (age 68–69)
- Education: University of Botswana and Swaziland
- Occupation: Lawyer
- Known for: Human rights work
- Awards: International Press Freedom Award (2005); Ludovic-Trarieux International Human Rights Prize (2009)

Beatrice Mtetwa (born 1957) is a Zimbabwean lawyer who has been internationally recognized for her defense of journalists and press freedom. The New York Times described her in 2008 as "Zimbabwe's top human rights lawyer".

== Legal practice ==
Born in Swaziland, Mtetwa received her LLB from the University of Botswana and Swaziland in 1981 and spent the next two years working as a prosecuting attorney in Swaziland. In 1983, she moved to Zimbabwe, where she continued working as a prosecutor until 1989. That year, she went into private practice, and soon began specializing in human rights law. In one of her more notable cases, she successfully challenged a section of Zimbabwe's Private Voluntary Organizations Act which allowed a government minister the authority to dissolve or replace the board members of non-governmental organizations. She also challenged the results of 37 districts in the 2000 parliamentary elections. In a PBS documentary, Mtetwa described her motives for her activism as "not because there is any glory or cash to it and not because I'm trying to antagonize the government... I'm doing it because it's a job that's got to be done".

Mtetwa is particularly noted for her defense of arrested journalists, both local and international. In 2003, for example, she won a court order preventing the deportation of Guardian reporter Andrew Meldrum, presenting it to security officials at Harare International Airport only minutes before Meldrum's plane was scheduled to depart. She also won acquittals for detained reporters Toby Harnden and Julian Simmonds from London's Sunday Telegraph, who had been arrested during coverage of the April parliamentary election on charges of working without government accreditation. In April 2008, she secured the release of New York Times reporter Barry Bearak, who had been imprisoned on similar charges. She also defended many local journalists arrested in the run-up to the 2008 presidential election. Mtetwa is also a director who sits on the Econet board .

Mtetwa and Tawanda Nyambirai founded Mtetwa & Nyambirai Legal Practitioners in 2006 and it has established itself over the past decade as one of Zimbabwe's leading law firms. Mtetwa & Nyambirai's history is punctuated by landmark cases in multiple areas of the law. With Econet Wireless’s the largest telecommunications company in Zimbabwe being the firms most notable clients, the Econet name appears on many of those landmark cases. These include cases such as Econet Wireless v Trustco Mobile, and Derdale v Econet Wireless which is now the seminal case on the inherent jurisdiction of the High Court under the 2013 Constitution of Zimbabwe.

Mtetwa's firm has been involved with multiple high-profile human rights cases and, Notably, was instrumental in the recovery of abducted activist Jestina Mukoko — who was held incommunicado and tortured for nearly a month in 2008. Mtetwa subsequently handled a string of related legal cases that followed, including securing a stay of prosecution for Mukoko and suing her abductors for damages in their personal capacity. Over the years, the Mtetwa and Nyambirai has grown into a full service law firm with the capacity to handle matters relating to all aspects of Zimbabwean law.

== Imprisonment, assaults and threats ==
In 2003, Mtetwa was arrested on allegations of drunk driving. At the police station, she was reportedly beaten and choked before being released three hours later without a formal charge. Though unable to speak for two days after the attack, she returned on the third day with a folder of medical evidence in order to file charges against the police officers who assaulted her. Police officers reportedly attacked Mtetwa again in 2007, beating her and three colleagues with rubber truncheons during a march protesting harassment of Zimbabwe's lawyers.

In an interview with the Committee to Protect Journalists, Mtetwa described her procedure for averting potential attacks:

"I think I confront the danger immediately before it happens. I always make sure that if, for instance, I'm called in the middle of the night to a scene that is potentially dangerous, I make sure that there are as many media practitioners as possible, particularly to record what will happen there. And in the glare of cameras I find that people don't want to do what they would want to do. So in a lot of ways I think I've been lucky, and I haven't received as much harassment as one would have expected, or as much as other human rights defenders have had."

On 17 March 2013, Mtetwa was arrested while executing her professional duties. She was attending to a client whose home was searched by the police. Mtetwa was placed under arrest after requesting the production of a valid search warrant and an inventory list of items that had already been removed. Her mobile phone, containing privileged attorney-client communication, was confiscated. She was charged with defeating and / or obstructing the course of justice under the Criminal Law (Codification and Reform) Act, section 184(1)(g).

The Zimbabwean police defied an emergency high court ruling ordering the release of Mtetwa and continued to hold her on charges of obstructing justice. After more than a week in jail, Mtetwa was released on Monday 25 March 2013 after a high court judge overruled a lower court's decision that she be held without bail on a charge of obstruction of justice.

On 26 November 2013, Magistrate Rumbidzai Mugwagwa said Mtetwa had no case to answer to. Magistrate Mugwagwa found that there was no evidence to suggest that Mtetwa caused the police to fail to perform their duties.

== International recognition ==
In 2005, she won the International Press Freedom Award of the Committee to Protect Journalists. The award citation stated that "in a country where the law is used as a weapon against independent journalists, Mtetwa has defended journalists and argued for press freedom, all at great personal risk." She also won the group's Burton Benjamin Memorial Award for Lifetime Achievement in 2008.

Mtetwa was also received several awards from legal organizations. In 2009, the European Bar Human Rights Institute awarded her the Ludovic-Trarieux International Human Rights Prize ("The award given by lawyers to a lawyer"), reserved each year to a lawyer who throughout his or her career has illustrated, by activity or suffering, the defence of human rights in the world. Mtetwa also won the 2010 International Human Rights award of the American Bar Association. In 2011, she was awarded the Inamori Ethics Prize by Case Western Reserve University in the US. In 2014, she was a recipient of the International Women of Courage Award.

St. Francis Xavier University, located in Nova Scotia, Canada, was the first university to celebrate Mtetwa's many achievements by presenting her with an honorary degree in May 2013.

In December 2013, Mtetwa was awarded with an honorary Doctor of Laws (LLD) by the University of Bath in the United Kingdom in recognition of her work.

In April 2016, Mtetwa was awarded an honorary Doctor of Laws (LLD) degree by Rhodes University in South Africa in recognition of her achievements in the promotion and protection of human rights in Zimbabwe.
