= Judith Woods =

Canadian federal judge

Federal Court of Appeal
- Incumbent
- Assumed office June 16, 2016

Personal details
- Education: University of Western Ontario; Georgetown University

Judith Woods is a Canadian judge who serves on the Federal Court of Appeal.

== History ==
Judith M. Woods was appointed to the Federal Court of Appeal on June 16, 2016. She replaced Mr. Justice C. Michael Ryer, who resigned effective May 1, 2016. Madame Justice Woods was previously a judge of the Tax Court of Canada, where she served from 2003 to 2016.
