= Imaan Mazari =

Pakistani human rights lawyer

- ایمان مزاری
- Born: Imaan Zainab Mazari-Hazir; 3 July 1993 (age 33); Islamabad, Pakistan
- Education: University of Edinburgh
- Occupation: Human rights lawyer
- Spouse: Hadi Ali Chattha
- Mother: Shireen Mazari

Imaan Zainab Mazari-Hazir (Urdu: ایمان زینب مزاری حاضر) is a Pakistani human rights activist and lawyer, and the daughter of politician Shireen Mazari.

== Background ==
Mazari was born to Tabish Hazir and Shireen Mazari in Islamabad. Her mother, Shireen Mazari, is a politician and human rights activist who served as the Federal Minister for Human Rights. Her father, Tabish Hazir, was a medical doctor who died in 2022. She is a granddaughter of the Pakistani poet Taufiq Raufat. Mazari graduated from the University of Edinburgh, where she initiated her legal career while pursuing her studies.

== Career ==
During the 2017 Faizabad sit-in organized by Tehreek-e-Labbaik Pakistan, Imaan expressed criticism towards the military's involvement in the agreement between the government and protestors. This led to a statement from her mother Shireen Mazari, who distanced herself from Imaan's remarks. Following this, a targeted campaign against Imaan ensued on social media and old photographs of her attending a party were circulated with the intention of shaming her. In response, Imaan served a legal notice to Brigadier Tariq Izaz for allegedly defaming her.

In 2020, amidst the imposition of criminal defamation charges against journalists who expressed criticism of the government, a Journalists Defense Committee was formed, comprising lawyers from the Pakistan Bar Council, this committee aimed to provide pro bono legal assistance to journalists encountering harassment due to their professional work. Imaan played an active role as a member of this committee, and represented numerous journalists such as Asad Ali Toor, Mudassar Naaru, and Absar Alam.

In 2021, Shireen Mazari received a threatening message, urging her to take action concerning her daughter or face consequences. Shortly after this threat, Imaan's parked car at Rawalpindi Katchery was hit by an unidentified vehicle.

On 2 March 2022, Islamabad Police filed a sedition case against Imaan and numerous students involved in a protest against the racial profiling and surveillance of Baloch students in universities located in Islamabad. Subsequently, the Islamabad High Court (IHC) issued an order preventing the arrest of Mazari. The Chief Justice of the IHC Athar Minallah stated during a hearing he would not tolerate harassment resulting from criticism. On 21 March, the Islamabad police retracted the sedition case filed against Mazari and approximately 200 Baloch students.

On 21 May 2022, her mother Shireen Mazari was arrested by police in connection with a land ownership and transfer case. The same day, a video surfaced on social media featuring Mazari making statements about then Chief of Army Staff (COAS) Qamar Javed Bajwa. Subsequently, on 26 May, a First Information Report (FIR) was filed against Mazari based on a complaint lodged by Lt Colonel Syed Humayun Iftikhar, representing the Judge Advocate General Branch of the General Headquarters (GHQ). The FIR alleged Mazari had made "derogatory and hateful" remarks against the Pakistan Army. Following this, the IHC granted pre-arrest bail to Mazari. The case was subsequently dismissed by IHC Chief Justice Athar Minallah after Mazari expressed remorse for her statements. It was noted as a unique case in the history of the Pakistani judiciary, where both the prosecution and defense agreed the crime was committed by Mazari, yet the court acquitted her.

On 20 August 2023, she was arrested after a rally organized by the Pashtun Tahafuz Movement (PTM) rights group in Islamabad on 18 August. Videos circulated on social media depicting her delivering a speech where she vehemently criticized the military for alleged abductions. However, soon after her release on bail on 28 August, she was re-arrested from outside Adiala Jail in connection with a new case involving terrorism charges. On 2 September, an Islamabad anti-terrorism court (ATC) approved post-arrest bail for Mazari in the case. According to the Human Rights Watch “in arresting Imaan Mazari and others, Pakistani authorities are using vague, over broad anti-terrorism laws to stifle dissent.”

According to Asian Human Rights Commission, Mazari is "a distinguished human rights lawyer, widely respected for her advocacy on behalf of persecuted religious and ethnic communities, especially on offences perpetrated by the Pakistani military and security forces, and one of the few lawyers representing missing persons in Islamabad." She is also known for her involvement in legal cases pertaining to the abduction and racial profiling of Baloch students in Islamabad.

On 23 January 2026, Mazari and her husband, human rights lawyer Hadi Ali Chattha, were arrested on charges of using social media to malign the state and its security institutions. They were convicted and sentenced to 17 years' imprisonment the next day.

On 12 June 2026, she was awarded jointly with her husband, human rights lawyer Hadi Ali Chattha, with the Ludovic-Trarieux International Human Rights Prize for 2026 (also called "The Tribute of Lawyers to a Lawyer").

On 17 September 2026, the Supreme Court of Pakistan granted Mazari and Chattha bail and ordered their release pending the Islamabad High Court's final decision on their appeals. Hours after their release, they were rearrested on separate, older anti-terrorism charges linked to a 2025 investigation concerning their participation in a protest. Later that month, experts from the United Nations urged Pakistani authorities to release Mazari and Ali Chattha. On 30 October, the couple were sentenced to 10 years' imprisonment on the said charges.

== Personal life ==
In December 2023, Mazari married Hadi Ali Chattha, a human rights lawyer.
