= Alban Garon =

Canadian judge (1930–2007)

The Honourable Alban Garon

Tax Court of Canada
- In office September 1988 – November 2004

Personal details
- Born: March 4, 1930 Saint-Lambert-de-Lauzon, Quebec
- Died: June 29, 2007 (aged 77) Ottawa, Ontario
- Spouse: Raymonde

Alban Garon (March 4, 1930 – June 29, 2007) served as a judge from 1988 to 2004 and was Chief Justice of the Tax Court of Canada.

On June 30, 2007, he was found beaten and murdered along with his wife and a neighbour in his Ottawa condominium.

== Early life ==
He was born in Saint-Lambert-de-Lauzon, Quebec and was educated at Laval University and the University of Ottawa.

== Career ==
Garon was called to the Bar of Quebec in 1955 and was named a Queen's Counsel in 1968. He practised law with the Canadian Department of Justice from 1955 until 1986. Garon was a legal professor at the University of Ottawa from 1956 until 1978 and from 1986 until 1992.

In September 1988, Garon was appointed a judge in the Tax Court of Canada, and was made associate chief judge eleven years later. In February 2000, he was named Chief Judge, and was made Chief Justice in July 2003.

Upon Garon's retirement in November 2004, Donald Bowman was named his successor as Chief Justice.

== Murder ==
On June 30, 2007, the bodies of Garon, his wife Raymonde and a neighbour Marie-Claire Beniskos were found inside the Garons' 10th floor condominium near the Rideau River. Investigators believed that the victims were murdered on the morning of the day before. The three people had been bound, gagged and beaten.

In the course of their investigation, police found that images from video surveillance cameras for the luxury condominium complex were not being recorded.

On October 31, Ottawa police released a sketch of a man wanted for questioning in connection with the murders. The man had been seen in a building elevator on the morning of the day before the bodies were found.

One year later, police featured the murders on a Crime Stoppers television segment and offered a $100,000 reward for information leading to an arrest.

On February 16, 2015, Ian Bush was named a chief suspect. At the time of the police announcement, Bush was receiving assessment at the Royal Ottawa Hospital after being charged with home invasion, robbery and attempted killing of a 101-year-old war veteran, Ernest Côté, in December 2014. Investigators of the home invasion and attempted murder found DNA evidence linking Bush to the 2007 homicide of the Garons and Beniskos. Bush's modus operandi was the same—suffocating the victims by placing plastic bags over their heads. Alban Garon was targeted because he was the Chief Justice of the Tax Court and had dismissed Bush's appeal involving business expenses and moving expenses. Bush underwent a jury trial in the spring of 2017 and was found guilty of triple-homicide on May 17, 2017, after one hour and 22 minutes of deliberation. Bush was sentenced to three life sentences.
