= Pierre Archambault =

Canadian judge

Tax Court of Canada
- Incumbent
- Assumed office March 24, 1993

Pierre Archambault is a judge who has served on the Tax Court of Canada since March 24, 1993.
