= Eugene Rossiter =

Canadian judge

Eugene Rossiter is the chief justice of the Tax Court of Canada. He took office on November 23, 2006. Rossiter was born in Morell, Prince Edward Island. He received a Bachelor of Business Administration from St. Francis Xavier University and a Bachelor of Laws from Dalhousie University. Justice Rossiter was called to the Bar of Prince Edward Island in 1978 and was appointed Queen's Counsel in 1991. He is a founding director and secretary-general of the International Association of Tax Judges from 2010 to 2011, and has served as its president since 2011.
