= Shireen Mazari =

Pakistani Baloch Politician and former Minister of Human Rights of Pakistan

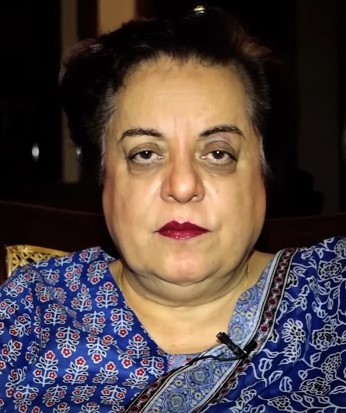

Minister of Human Rights
- In office 20 August 2018 – 10 April 2022
- President: Mamnoon Hussain; Arif Alvi
- Prime Minister: Imran Khan
- Preceded by: Roshan Khursheed Bharucha (caretaker)
- Succeeded by: Riaz Hussain Pirzada

Member of the National Assembly
- In office 13 August 2018 – 29 July 2022
- Succeeded by: Asiya Azeem
- Constituency: Reserved seat for women
- In office 1 June 2013 – 31 May 2018
- Constituency: Reserved seat for women

Personal details
- Born: 26 April 1949 (age 77) Quetta, Balochistan, Pakistan
- Other political affiliations: PTI (2013-2023)
- Spouse: Tabish Aitbar Hazir
- Relations: Hadi Ali Chattha (son-in-law)
- Children: Imaan Zainab Mazari
- Education: Columbia University; London School of Economics

Shireen Mehrunnisa Mazari (Urdu: شیریں مہر النساء مزاری) is a former Pakistani politician who served as the Federal Minister for Human Rights, from 20 August 2018 to 10 April 2022. She has been the chairperson of the Parliamentary Committee on Appointment of Chief Election Commissioner and Members of the Election Commission of Pakistan. She has been former a member of the National Assembly of Pakistan from 2018 to 2022, and served as the chief whip for Pakistan Tehreek-e-Insaf. She was also a National Assembly member from June 2013 to May 2018.

Mazari studied at the London School of Economics and later received her PhD from Columbia University in political science. Mazari joined Quaid-i-Azam University as an associate professor and went on to head the university's strategic studies department. In 2002, Mazari became the head of the government-funded Institute of Strategic Studies and remained until she was sacked in 2008. In 2009, Mazari became the editor of The Nation.

== Early life and education ==
Mazari, an ethnic Baloch, was born to Sardar Ashiq Mazari, a feudal lord from Rojhan Tehsil in Rajanpur District, Punjab. She is a graduate of the London School of Economics. She received her PhD in political science from Columbia University.

== Professional career ==
In 2008, Government of Pakistan removed Mazari from the post of Director General of The Institute of Strategic Studies where she was due to retire in 2009.

In 2009, Mazari was appointed as the editor of The Nation. She also hosted a weekly television show on the Waqt News. Mazari came under intensive criticism from the Committee to Protect Journalists after she publicly alleged an American journalist to be a CIA spy.

She had been an associate professor at Quaid-i-Azam University and later became chairperson of the university's Department of Defense and Strategic Studies.

== Personal life ==
Shireen is married to Tabish Aitbar Hazir. The couple has a daughter, Imaan Zainab Mazari Hazir and a son Sabeel Hazir.

== Political career ==
Mazari joined the PTI in 2008 In 2009, she was Information Secretary and Spokesperson of PTI. In 2012, she resigned from PTI where she was the Central Vice President and in charge of Foreign Policy. citing "policy differences and its takeover by corrupt elements" after she was served a show cause notice by PTI for "making unfounded, incorrect, inaccurate and false statements in the media".

She rejoined PTI in 2013. She was elected as the member of the National Assembly of Pakistan for the first time in the 2013 Pakistani general election on the ticket of PTI on reserved seats for women from Punjab. She was the chief whip of PTI in the National Assembly of Pakistan.

She was re-elected to the National Assembly as a candidate of PTI on a seat reserved for women from Punjab in the 2018 Pakistani general election. On 18 August, Imran Khan formally announced his federal cabinet structure and Mazari was named as Minister for Human Rights. On 20 August 2018, she was sworn in as Federal Minister for Human Rights in the federal cabinet of Prime Minister Imran Khan.

In January 2020, she strongly condemned an attack on Karak temple by a mob of 1,500 local Muslims led by a local Islamic cleric and the supporters of Jamiat Ulema-e-Islam party.

In May 2022, she was arrested, but released after Islamabad High court ordered her release and called the arrest unlawful.

=== Resignation ===
On 10 April 2022, because of the Vote of No Confidence, she resigned from the National Assembly on the orders of Imran Khan. The newly elected Speaker accepted the resignations of eleven members on 28 July 2022, one of them was Shireen Mazari. After the 09/05 vandalism of Army installations, the beneficiaries of regime change after accusing the PTI members and leadership, carried out mass-scale arrests. Shireen Mazari upon 5 consecutive arrests and bails announced her retirement from active politics. On 23 May 2023, Shireen Mazari made the decision to leave the Pakistan Tehreek-e-Insaf party and publicly announced her retirement from active politics seemingly under considerable duress. Mazari cited personal reasons as the basis for her departure from the political arena. But according to some sources Sheeren Mazari left politics as she was forced to leave politics by the PDM government and the Army Establishment.

== Controversies ==
In 2019, after a terrorist attack in London, she chose to criticize Pakistan's leading newspaper Dawn for publicizing that the terrorist had been a man of Pakistani origin, rather than deploring the attack itself or offering condolences. She accused Dawn to pursue an anti-Pakistani agenda. While mobs surrounded the offices of Dawn calling for the editor to be hanged, she left the defense of the freedom of expression in Pakistan to others, such as Reporters without Borders.

On 21 November 2020, Mazari while citing an online article, wrote on Twitter that French president "Macron [was] doing to Muslims was what the Nazis did to the Jews – Muslim children will get ID numbers (other children won't) just as Jews were forced to wear the yellow star on their clothing for identification". French government denounced Mazari's tweet as "fake news and false accusation" and stated that "the proposed ID would be for all children in France". Bina Shah, a writer and New York Times columnist, said "just like in Pakistan, where as soon as you register a child's birth, the child will get assigned a 13 digit number which is then their NIC number when they reach 18". Later, Mazari deleted her tweet and issued a clarification stating that the article on the basis of which she had written her tweet has been amended. The online article, which was quoted by Mazari, now includes a clarification stating that the new law will be applied to all children in France. Foreign Ministry of France thanked Mazari for deleting her tweet and accepted her clarification.

Shireen Mazari has also been criticized for her silence on China's persecution of Uyghurs during a talkshow at Al Jazeera. However, Mazari said that "there may be such cases in China and we have taken up those cases with the Chinese and that is how we deal with our allies."

== Works ==
=== Books ===
- Pakistan's Security and the Nuclear Option, Institute of Policy Studies, 1995, 167 p. Co-edited with Tarik Jan et al.
- The Kargil Conflict, 1999: Separating Fact from Fiction, Institute of Policy Studies, 2003, 162 p.

=== Research papers ===
- Nuclear Safety and Terrorism: A Case Study of India, Institute of Strategic Studies, 2001, 46 p. Co-written with Maria Sultan.
- Pakistan's Nuclear Doctrine and Approach to Arms Control, Institute of South Asian Studies, 2005, 17 p.
- 'Islam and the West' Dialogue: What Achievements? What New Effective Methods?, ISIS Malaysia, 2008, 16 p.

== More Reading ==
- List of members of the 15th National Assembly of Pakistan
