= Brent Paris =

Canadian judge

Tax Court of Canada
- In office December 12, 2002 – April 3, 2019

Personal details
- Education: University of Ottawa

Brent Paris was a judge who served on the Tax Court of Canada. Prior to his appointment in December 2002, he was the Director of the Tax Law Services Section in the British Columbia Regional Office of Justice Canada.

Justice Paris resigned effective April 3, 2019, as stated in the April 17, 2019, Government of Canada News Release announcing the appointment of Mr. David E. Spiro to the Tax Court of Canada.
