= Don R. Sommerfeldt =

Tax Court of Canada
- Incumbent
- Assumed office May 29, 2015

Don R. Sommerfeldt is a judge currently serving on the Tax Court of Canada.

He graduated B.A.Sc. from the University of Lethbridge in 1972, M.A. from Brigham Young University in 1974, and LL.B. from the University of Alberta in 1977. He was admitted to the bar of Alberta, Canada in 1978, and practiced law, specialising in taxation. In 2000, he joined the firm of Fraser Milner Casgrain (in 2013 merged into Dentons). He graduated LL.M. from Cornell Law School in 2004, and was admitted to the bar of New York.

Sommerfeldt was appointed on May 29, 2015, to the seat on the Tax Court of Canada vacated by Georgette Sheridan who had resigned on May 1.
