= Ludovic Trarieux International Human Rights Prize =

International human rights award

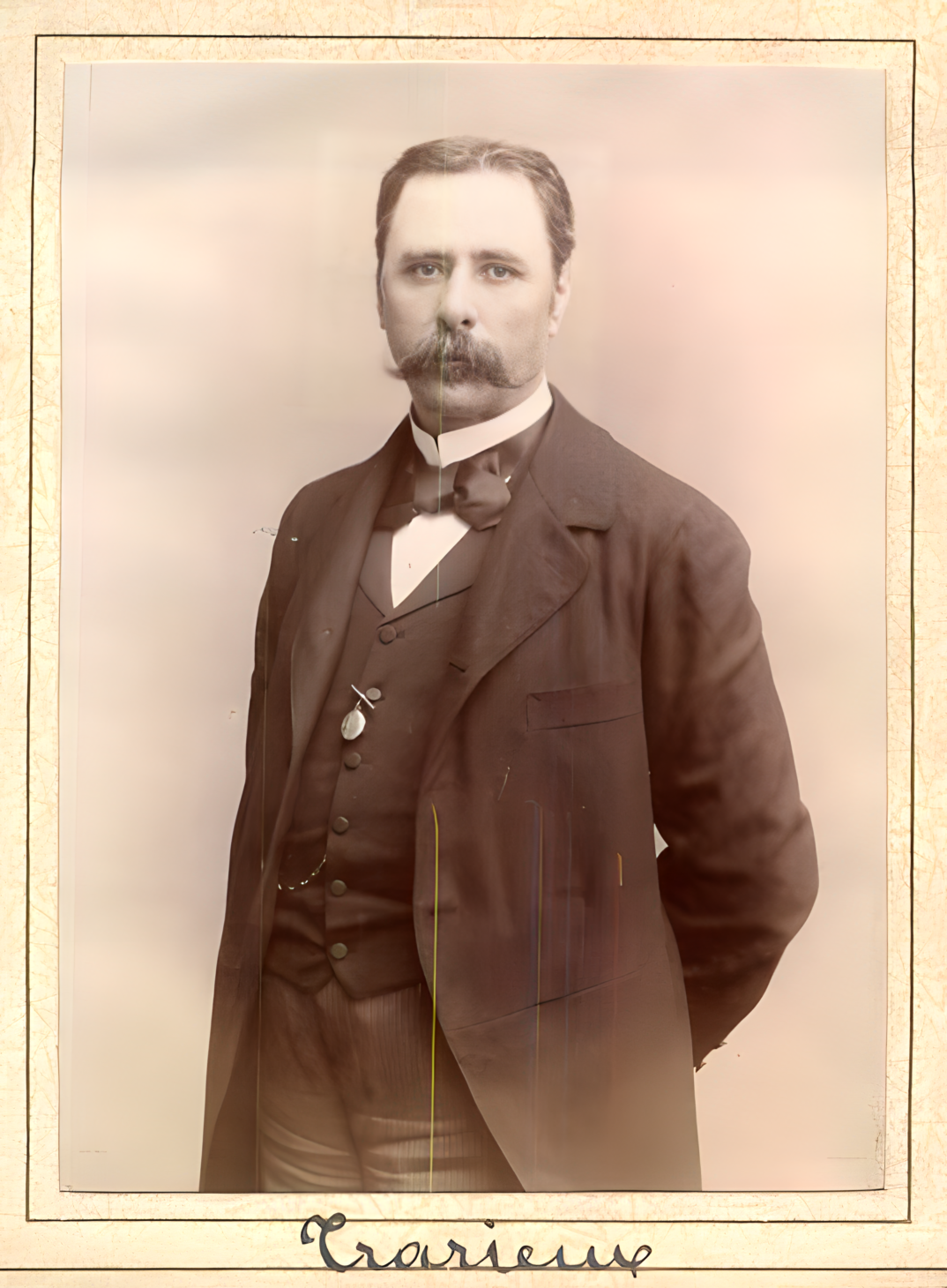
Ludovic Trarieux

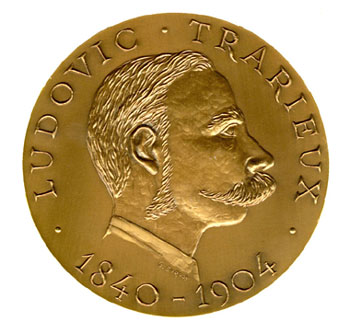
This is Ludovic-Trarieux International Human Rights Prize Medal that presents to lawyers whose work furthered the defence of human rights, the supremacy of law, or resistant to intolerance and racism.

The Ludovic Trarieux International Human Rights Prize, or Ludovic Trarieux Award, -also called "The Tribute of Lawyers to a Lawyer"- is an international human rights award given annually to a lawyer for contributions to the defence of human rights.

== History ==
The Prize was inaugurated in Bordeaux in 1984 by French lawyer Bertrand Favreau, to recognise lawyers of any Bar or nationality whose work furthered the defence of human rights, the supremacy of law, or resistance to intolerance and racism. The prize is awarded after consultation with international NGOs and humanitarian organizations. It commemorates the memory of the French lawyer, Ludovic Trarieux (1840–1904), who in the midst of the Dreyfus Affair, in France, in 1898, founded the Ligue des droits de l'homme (LDH), "Human Rights League"). The first prize was awarded, on 29 March 1985, to South African leader Nelson Mandela, during his imprisonment. His daughter, Zenani Mandela Dlamini, received the award on Mandela's behalf on 27 April 1985. It was the first award given to Mandela in France, and the first internationally to have been awarded to him by lawyers.

Since 2003, the Prize has been awarded jointly by several institutions: the Human Rights Institute of The Bar of Bordeaux, the Human Rights Institute of the Bar of Paris, the Human Rights Institute of The Bar of Brussels, l'Unione forense per la tutela dei diritti dell'uomo (from Rome), the Bar of Amsterdam, Geneva and Luxemburg, the Berlin Bar Association, the Union Internationale des Avocats (UIA) and the European Bar Human Rights Institute (IDHAE), an organization representing human rights lawyers across Europe.

During the last decades, the Prize was presented by Robert Badinter (1998), Guy Canivet (2002), Dean Spielmann (2006), Emma Bonino (2008), Viviane Reding (2011), etc. The 17th Ludovic Trarieux International Human Rights Prize 2012 was awarded to Muharrem Erbey (Turkey, in jail since December 2009, and presented to his wife, Burçin Erbey, in Berlin by German minister of Justice Sabine Leutheusser-Schnarrenberger on 30 November 2012.

The 18th Ludovic Trarieux International Human Rights Prize 2013 was presented to Vadim Kuramshin, a human rights lawyer similarly imprisoned in Kazakhstan.

== Nomination and selection ==
Nominations are assessed by a panel of 21 to 27 european lawyers, in consultation with NGOs and bar associations around the world.

== Past recipients of the Ludovic Trarieux Award ==
- 1985 : Nelson Mandela, South Africa
- 1992 : Augusto Zúñiga Paz, Peru
- 1994 : Jadranka Cigelj, Bosnia-Herzegovina
- 1996 : joint recipients Nejib Hosni, Tunisia and Dalila Meziane, Algeria
- 1998 : Zhou Guoqiang, China
- 2000 : Esber Yagmurdereli, Turkey
- 2002 : Mehrangiz Kar, Iran
- 2003 : joint recipients Digna Ochoa and Bárbara Zamora, Mexico
- 2004 : Aktham Naisse, Syria
- 2005 : Henri Burin des Roziers, Brazil
- 2006 : Parvez Imroz, India
- 2007 : René Gómez Manzano, Cuba
- 2008 : U Aye Myint, Myanmar(Award presented in Berlin by Emma Bonino on 22 October 2008 in the Italian Senate.
- 2009 : Beatrice Mtetwa, Zimbabwe
- 2010 : Karinna Moskalenko, Russia
- 2011 : Fathi Terbil, Libya (Award presented in Brussels by Viviane Reding on 1 December 2011).
- 2012 : Muharrem Erbey, Turkey (Award presented in Berlin by German Justice Minister Sabine Leutheusser-Schnarrenberger on 30 November 2012).
- 2013: Vadim Kuramshin, Kazakhstan
- 2014: Mahienour El-Massry, Egypt
- 2015: Waleed Abulkhair, Saudi Arabia
- 2016: Wang Yu (lawyer), China
- 2017: Mohammed Al-Rukn, United Arab Emirates
- 2018: Nasrin Sotoudeh, Iran
- 2019: Rommel Duran, Colombia
- 2020: Ebru and Barkin Timtik, Turkey
- 2021: Freshta Karimi, Afghanistan
- 2022: Amirsalar Davoudi, Iran
- 2023: Yulia Yurhilevich, Belarus
- 2024: Ywet Nu Aung, Myanmar
- 2025: Dmitry Talantov, Russia
- 2026: Imaan Mazari and Hadi Ali Chattha, Pakistan

== Special Mention of the Jury ==
Since 2016, the Jury awards annually the "Special Mention of the Jury" to a bar that has illustrated by its action, its work or its sufferings the defense of human rights The following is the list of distinguished bars:

- 2017: Balochistan Bar Council
- 2018: Diyarbakir Bar Association (Dyabakir Barosu)
- 2019: Central Bar Association of Crimea
- 2020: Bar of Port au Prince
- 2021: The Bar Association of Beirut, Lebanon
- 2022: The Warsaw Bar Association, Poland
- 2023: The Tunis Bar, Tunesia
- 2024: Law Society of Northern Ireland
- 2024: Istanbul Bar Association
- 2024: South Sudan Bar Association
