= Siamak Pourzand =

Iranian journalist and film critic (1931–2011)

- Born: 17 September 1931
- Died: 29 April 2011 (aged 79); Tehran, Iran
- Occupations: journalist and film critic
- Spouse: Mehrangiz Kar

Siamak Pourzand (Persian: سيامک پورزند; 17 September 1931 – 29 April 2011) was an Iranian journalist and film critic. He was the manager of the Majmue-ye Farhangi-Honari-ye Tehran—a cultural center for writers, artists, and intellectuals—and wrote cultural commentary for several reformist newspapers later shut down by the Iranian government. In 2001, he was imprisoned for his articles critical of Iranian leadership, a move condemned by numerous human rights and journalism organizations.

== Journalistic career ==
Siamak Pourzand began his career in journalism with the newspaper Bakhtar Emroz in 1952. In the 1960s and 70s, Pourzand served as an American correspondent for the newspaper Keyhan. His notable assignments included covering the funeral of John F. Kennedy as well as interviewing Richard Nixon. He also reported on Hollywood and became one of Iran's "best known film critics", writing for the French film journal Cahiers du cinéma.

Following the 1979 Iranian Revolution, however, Pourzand lost his job at Keyhan and began working at trade journals. Pourzand was reportedly "secular to the core" and viewed the new rulers of the Islamic Republic with suspicion. In the late 1990s, he began to write a series of articles critical to the government, placing them in opposition newspapers. Among them was a piece on the funerals of Dariush and Parvaneh Eskandari Forouhar, victims of Iran's 1998 "Chain Murders", in which a series of prominent dissidents were murdered in their homes by members of Iran's intelligence agency. Pourzand also reported the funeral live by telephone for a Los Angeles-based radio station.

== Arrest and trial ==
In 2000, Pourzand's wife Mehrangiz Kar, also a critic of the Iranian government, was arrested for her participation in a conference at Berlin's Heinrich Böll Foundation titled "Iran after the elections", at which various reform proposals were debated; she ultimately served a 52-day prison term. Pourzand's own arrest soon followed. On 29 November 2001, days after reportedly seeing men following him on motorcycles, Pourzand was kidnapped by members of the Amaken, agents of Committee for the Propagation of Virtue and the Prohibition of Vice, shortly after leaving his sister's apartment. On 7 December, one of his sisters was requested by government officials to bring him a change of clothes, but was reportedly told that his whereabouts were "none of her business".

On 9 March 2002, the government-run newspaper Iran Daily announced that Pourzand would be facing trial. Immediately before the trial, Pourzand's daughter reported that her father had called her in the United States to say that the family should "treat him as if he were dead". According to Iran Daily, Pourzand confessed to nine charges, including working for the state security forces of the former Shah and maintaining contact with the Shah's son, Reza Pahlavi, overseas. His trial was closed to the public, and he was reportedly denied access to his own legal representation. He was ultimately sentenced to eleven years' imprisonment and a flogging of seventy-four lashes. Amnesty International reported that the group believed him to have been "ill-treated" during his interrogation and called for his release as a prisoner of conscience. Human Rights Watch similarly denounced the trial as a "mockery of the law", and "of a pattern of repression against reformist and independent figures that has gathered momentum since February's 2000 parliamentary elections".

== Imprisonment ==
Pourzand appealed his sentence, but it was upheld by the Tehran Appeals Court on 9 July 2002. In a confession on Iranian television broadcast a week later, Pourzand confessed to charges including "having links with monarchists and counter-revolutionaries", "spying and undermining state security", and "creating disillusionment among young people". Amnesty International reported that he looked "frail" and "seemed to have lost at least 30 kg". At around this time, Pourzand tried to hang himself with his belt, but failed.

He was briefly released from prison on health reasons in November 2002, and stayed with his sister for several months before being brought to Evin prison in March 2003. After reportedly refusing the demands of Amaken agents to implicate other dissident figures, he was kept at the prison. At this time, he began to suffer from spinal stenosis and became unable to walk.

In March 2004, Pourzand suffered a severe heart attack, following which prison officials allegedly delayed treating him until another prisoner demanded that they do so. In 2006, in light of his ongoing health issues, Pourzand was transferred to house arrest.

== Suicide and funeral ==
Pourzand died on 29 April 2011. According to his daughters, he committed suicide by jumping from the sixth-story balcony of his apartment in Tehran. His daughter, Banafsheh Zand, stated after his death that "He leapt to his own death to prove his disgust for a regime that is inhumane and un-Iranian", while another daughter, Azadeh Pourzand, commented that "I would like to think of his death as a way for him to finally find freedom." Banafsheh also alleged that state security forces continued to threaten the family by telephone, saying "Now that we're rid of your father... don't go thinking you can fill his place. We know how to deal with you and the rest of your family." The journalist-protection organization Reporters Without Borders issued a press release mourning Pourzand's death and calling the Iranian government "responsible for Siamak Pourzand's death". Leili and Azadeh Pourzand appeared on the Voice of America's Persian program Parazit, explaining how they found out about their father's death.

The Telegraph reported that Iranian authorities initially refused to hand over Pourzand's body to his family for burial, imposed restrictions on the eulogies at his funeral, and confiscated the cell phones and cameras of reporters.

== Family ==
Pourzand's wife Mehrangiz Kar is an internationally noted feminist and winner of National Endowment for Democracy's Democracy award.

Pourzand was a first cousin of Persian poet Ahmad Shamlou on his mother's side.

== Litigation in United States ==
In 2019, Mr. Pourzand's wife Mehrangiz Kar, and two of his daughters, Azadeh Pourzand and Banafsheh Zand file a complaint against Islamic Republic of Iran and IRGC for torturing, hostage taking, and extrajudicial killing of Mr. Pourzand under FSIA. On September 30, 2022, Judge John Bates ordered that Iran is liable for torturing and hostage taking of Mr. Pourzand. The Court awarded compensatory damages totaling, with prejudgment interest, $17,403,063.01 for Plaintiffs. The Court will also award punitive damages of $17,403,063.01. Plaintiffs’ total award is $34,806,126.02. Ali Herischi was the attorney for Plaintiffs.
