= Zanan-e Emruz =

Zanan Emrooz is an Iranian monthly magazine owned by Shahla Sherkat which started its publication in June 2014. After 11 volumes, it was suspended in April 2015 and re-launched publication in October 2015. The magazine is a continuation of a formerly banned monthly magazine on women called Zanan magazine.

This independent magazine addresses women's issues to improve their cultural, social, scientific, artistic and political rights and to empower women.

== Suspension ==
Zanan Emrooz was suspended on the charge of not preserving women's rights and insisting on addressing obsolete issues like women's presence in stadiums as well as white marriage. Shahla Sherkat defended her article saying that the suspension was without any prior caution and her magazine addressed the issues from a very objective point of view as it is the only solely feminist magazine in Iran. Furthermore, issues including women's presence in stadiums, as well as white marriage (for which the magazine has been charged), were addressed in many other domestic organizations, medias and magazines.
