= Diane Campbell =

Canadian lawyer

Judge of the Tax Court of Canada
- Incumbent
- Assumed office May 11, 2000

Personal details
- Born: Summerside, Prince Edward Island, Canada
- Education: University of Prince Edward; Island (BA); University of New Brunswick (LLB); Harvard University (LLM)

Diane Campbell is a Canadian lawyer and jurist serving as a judge of the Tax Court of Canada.

== Early life and education ==
Campbell is a native of Summerside, Prince Edward Island. She earned a Bachelor of Arts degree from the University of Prince Edward Island in 1972, a Bachelor of Laws from the University of New Brunswick Faculty of Law in 1975, and a Master of Laws from Harvard Law School.

== Career ==
For 25 years, Campbell operated a private legal practice in Prince County, Prince Edward Island, specializing in commercial, estates, and real estate law. In 2000, she was appointed to the Tax Court of Canada. In 2013, Campbell ruled that polygamist leader Winston Blackmore's sect did not qualify for certain tax exemptions.
