= United States v. GlaxoSmithKline =

U.S. antitrust case involving a pharmaceutical company

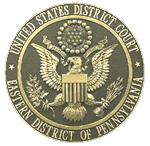
- Court: United States District Court for the Eastern District of Pennsylvania
- Full case name: United States of America, ex rel. Robert J. Merena, et al. v. Smithkline Beecham Clinical Laboratories, Inc.
- Decided: April 10, 1998

Holding
- Settled under court order; settled for $325 million.

Court membership
- Judge sitting: Donald W. VanArtsdalen

United States v. GlaxoSmithKline was a case before the United States District Court for the Eastern District of Pennsylvania. Robert J. Merena was one of the first who filed claims against SmithKline Beecham Clinical Laboratories on November 12, 1993. The complaints alleged that GlaxoSmithKline, which operated a system of clinical laboratories, adopted myriad complicated procedures for the purpose of defrauding state and federal healthcare programs, in particular Medicare and Medicaid. The U.S. Justice Department publicly praised Robert Merena for his "cooperation and support" in helping the government collect the largest settlement ever involving a whistle-blower lawsuit. The SmithKline settlement is considered to be one of the largest whistleblower assisted recoveries in the history of the United States.

== Background ==
In 1992, the United States began to suspect that SmithKline Beecham Clinical Laboratories and several other medical laboratories in the United States had adopted a scheme that allowed them to bill the federal government for unauthorized and unnecessary laboratory tests. The laboratories had "bundled" a standard grouping of blood tests with some additional tests and had then marketed this grouping to doctors by leading them to believe that the additional tests would not increase costs to Medicare and other government-sponsored health programs. After the ordering of tests, the laboratories "unbundled" the additional tests from the standard grouping for purposes of billing. In many cases, treating physicians had made no determination that the additional tests were medically necessary for the diagnosis or treatment of patients; rather the physicians had preferred to order the tests solely because they were sold as a package with other tests that they had deemed necessary. As a result, the laboratories submitted bills-and received payment-for tests that were medically unnecessary.

The scheme later became popular as automated chemistry and attracted national attention in December 1992 when one of the contractors that had engaged in the practice, National Health Laboratories, settled a lawsuit brought under the False Claims Act for $111 million. Due to these allegations public started taking interest because the media reported that the government had issued comprehensive subpoenas to GlaxoSmithKline and other laboratories.

In November 1993, relator Robert Marena, an SKB employee, filed a qui tam action against GlaxoSmithKline in the United States District Court for the Eastern District of Pennsylvania. His complaint contained eight separate claims under the False Claims Act. Merena's complaint alleged that SKB had defrauded the government by, inter alia, billing for tests that were not performed, double billing, paying illegal kickbacks to health care professionals, and adding tests to "automated chemistry" profiles and then separately billing for those tests.

After a month, relator Glenn Grossenbacher, an attorney, filed a second qui tam action against GlaxoSmithKline in the United States District Court for the Western District of Texas. Relators Kevin Spear, Jack Dowden, and the Berkeley Community Law Center (collectively, "the Spear relators") followed in February 1995 with a suit in the Northern District of California. The courts in Texas and California transferred these actions to the Eastern District of Pennsylvania for consolidation with the Merena case.

After Merena's action was filed, the government commenced an investigation into a series of new claims that were not part of its original investigation. At the same time, the government continued to pursue the original "automated chemistry" investigation that it had begun after the 1992 settlement with National Health Laboratories.

Later in August 1995, the government began formal settlement negotiations with GlaxoSmithKline. The government presented GlaxoSmithKline with a written settlement framework that allocated a specific dollar amount for each alleged false claim.

== Litigants ==
The litigants of the case were Robert J. Merena, Charles W. Robinson, Jr., and Glenn Grossenbacher. Robert J. Merena left his job at GlaxoSmithKline in May 1995 and hasn't had a full-time job since. He has said he's had trouble finding another position because employers are wary of hiring a known whistle-blower. Merena, of the Reading, Pa., area, worked as a senior billing-systems analyst at a SmithKline Beecham office in Montgomery County. During his employment at GSK, he passed information to federal investigators working on the case.

== Settlement ==
The Judge Donald W. VanArtsdalen of United States District Court ruled that the three had contributed significantly to the Government's case against SmithKline. ordered the government to pay $42.3 million to three men who helped the Justice Department expose Medicare fraud at SmithKline Beecham Clinical Laboratories Inc. The Justice Department had resisted paying the men the 15 to 25 percent share of SmithKline's settlement specified for whistleblowers by the federal False Claims Act.

The department argued that most of the $325 million settlement was obtained through its nationwide Labscam investigations that had nothing to do with the men, Robert J. Merena, Charles W. Robinson, Jr., and Glenn Grossenbacher. But U.S. District Judge Donald W. VanArtsdalen ruled Wednesday that they made a major contribution to the government's case and that they helped bring in nearly all of the settlement.

I am left with the impression that the attorneys in charge of the Labscam investigation ... seek to take far more credit for the overall success of the proceedings than is rightly due.

Philadelphia-based SmithKline agreed to pay the government $325 million which is considered as one of the largest civil settlement ever in a whistle-blower lawsuit. The company settled after the government alleged it paid kickbacks to doctors, billed the government for laboratory tests not performed and committed other violations. SmithKline has denied the allegations, saying the violations were unintentional and the result of ambiguities in regulations and guidelines.

When interest and payments to state Medicare funds were taken into account, the final settlement came to about $321 million. VanArtsdalen said Merena and the other whistle-blowers accounted for all but about $15 million of that total. The government failed to reach an agreement with litigants Merena and Grossenbacher on the amount that they would receive from the settlement agreement. The government maintained that Merena was entitled to approximately $10 million of the $65 million attributable to the non-"automated chemistry" claims and has paid Merena this amount. The government and the Spear relators have a proposed agreement that, if approved, will award the Spear relators 15% of the $13 million that the government attributed to a claim called the "CBC Indices" claim.

The government previously agreed to pay the whistle-blowers a minimum of $9.7 million but only if they dropped claims to a larger portion.

But the judge's ruling adds an additional $42.3 million, meaning the men will share about 17 percent of the money the whistle-blowers helped bring in. The total award, $52 million, is considered to be the largest whistleblower award to date.

== See also ==
- Canada v GlaxoSmithKline Inc
