= Gaston Jorré =

Canadian judge

Tax Court of Canada
- Incumbent
- Assumed office December 15, 2006

Personal details
- Education: University of Toronto

Gaston Jorré is a judge currently serving on the Tax Court of Canada.
