= Hadi Ali Chattha =

Pakistani human rights lawyer

- ہادی علی چٹھہ
- Citizenship: Pakistan
- Occupation: Lawyer
- Organization: Asma Jahangir Legal Aid Cell
- Known for: Representing victims of human rights abuses in Pakistan
- Criminal charges: Acts of terrorism
- Criminal penalty: 10 years' imprisonment
- Criminal status: Imprisoned
- Spouse: Imaan Mazari
- Relatives: Shireen Mazari (mother-in-law)

Hadi Ali Chattha (Urdu: ہادی علی چٹھہ) is a Pakistani human rights activist and lawyer. The husband of fellow activist Imaan Mazari, he has been arrested on multiple occasions on charges that have been described as politically motivated by human rights groups.

== Activism ==
Chattha trained as a human rights lawyer with a speciality in criminal law. He began his career working pro bono for the Asma Jahangir Legal Aid Cell, where he represented victims of sexual violence, rape and enforced disappearance.

Chattha has worked for the Justice Project Pakistan, where he represented prisoners on death row. He has additionally represented over a dozen people accused of blasphemy, in addition to representing imprisoned human rights activists, such as Mahrang Baloch.

Chattha has been openly critical of human rights abuses carried out by the Pakistan Armed Forces in Balochistan and Khyber Pakhtunkhwa in operations against the Balochistan Liberation Army and Tehreek-i-Taliban.

== Arrests and imprisonment ==
On 20 March 2025, Chattha and his wife, Imaan Mazari, were issued summons by the Federal Investigation Agency in Lahore following allegations of blasphemy.

On 23 January 2026, Chattha and Mazari were arrested in relation to an alleged altercation that had occurred outside the Islamabad High Court. The following day, they were sentenced by the Sessions Court in Islamabad to 17 years in prison in a separate case, based on posts made on Twitter between 2021 and 2025 documenting human rights abuses in Pakistan, which were deemed to be critical of the Pakistani military and a breach of the Prevention of Electronic Crimes Act. They were subsequently detained at Adiala Jail in Rawalpindi.

On 17 September 2026, the Supreme Court of Pakistan suspended Chattha and Mazari's sentence and ordered that they be released on bail. Prior to being released from prison, police offices rearrested the couple in connection to a criminal complaint that had been filed against them on 22 March 2025 in Kohsar.

On 7 October 2026, the charges against Chattha and Mazari were released, which included terrorism charges. The evidence cited against them related to a protest they participated in on 25 October 2024, where it was alleged that they had removed traffic barriers in Islamabad set up during a visit of the England cricket team to Pakistan, constituting a security breach, in addition to obstructing police officers and chanting anti-government slogans. Chattha and Mazari filed a petition challenging the inclusion of terrorism charges; the request was dismissed by the Anti-Terrorism Court of Pakistan on 10 October, and Chattha, Mazari and their lawyers subsequently boycotted a hearing that took place later that day, stating they had not been permitted to meet or review evidence prior to the hearing.

During the trial, Chattha and Mazari denied the charges against them, stating the case had been fabricated to protect police officers who had threw a barrier at Mazari, hitting her in the abdomen; they also said the case was in response to their human rights work, describing themselves as prisoners of conscience. During the proceedings, Chattha and Mazari were kept in a cage, which they stated prevented them from having effective communication with their legal team. The only witnesses put forward during the trial were police officers, despite the alleged incident taking place on a busy road during morning traffic.

On 19 October 2026, the Anti-Terrorism Court refused an application by Chattha and Mazari to stay the trial. On 26 October, Chattha and Mazari filed a petition before the Supreme Court of Pakistan to overturn the court's decision, but prior to the application being reviewed, the Anti-Terrorism Court issued its judgement against the couple on 29 October 2026. They were sentenced to 10 years in prison and a fine of 100, 000 PKR for "acts of terrorism"; one year in prison and a fine of 50, 000 PKR for "obstructing a public servant"; and two years' imprisonment and a 50, 000 PKR fine for using "assault or criminal force to deter a public servant from discharging their duty". The prison sentences were ordered to be served concurrently. Chattha and Mazari were acquitted of "criminal intimidation", "criminal conspiracy" and "rioting as members of an unlawful assembly". The court justified its decision to convict on terrorism charges, stated that the offences related to the security arrangements of a visiting cricket team who had the status of state guests.

== Response ==
Front Line Defenders expressed concerns that Chattha and Mazari were being targeted due to their human rights work and called on Pakistani authorities to immediately and unconditionally release them. Amnesty International said they were being targeted because of their refusal to stop their "fearless" human rights work.

A group of 10 human rights organisations, including the Alliance for Lawyers at Risk, Article 19, the Council of Bars and Law Societies of Europe, the European Association of Lawyers for Democracy and World Human Rights, Front Line Defenders, the International Association of People's Lawyers, the International Bar Association, the International Commission of Jurists, the International Federation for Human Rights, the International Observatory for Lawyers at Risk, the Law Society of England and Wales, Lawyers for Lawyers, the New York City Bar Association, PEN Norway and the World Organisation Against Torture, signed an open statement calling for an end to the "cycle of detention and harassment" against Chattha and Mazari.

On 12 June 2026, Chattha and Mazari received the Ludovic Trarieux International Human Rights Prize. In September 2026, experts from the United Nations urged Pakistani authorities to release Chattha and Mazari.

== Personal life ==
Chattha and Mazari married in December 2023.
