= Mohammed Al-Rukn =

Emirati constitutional lawyer and political prisoner

Mohammed Abdullah Al-Rukn
- Born: September 26, 1962 (age 64); Dubai, UAE
- Other names: Mohamed Al-Roken, Mohammed Abdulla Al Roken
- Education: Ph.D., constitutional law, Warwick University
- Occupations: lawyer, political activist
- Known for: constitutional law expertise, imprisoned for human rights activity
- Movement: Emirati political opposition
- Criminal status: missing, presumed incarcerated
- Spouse: Umm Rashid
- Children: Rashid al-Rukn, Khalid al-Rukn, Bushra al-Rukn
- Relatives: Abdulla al-Hajeri (son in law)
- Website: drmalroken.wordpress.com

Mohammed Abdullah Al-Rukn (Arabic: محمد عبدالله الركن) is an Emirati lawyer and political activist who was born on 26 September 1962.

Al-Rukn was incarcerated by Emirati authorities and given a 10 year sentence for being part of Al Islah, an organization that is labeled as a terrorist organization in the UAE.

== Early life ==
Al-Rukn was born in Dubai, UAE to a modest family of Ajam ancestry. He attended primary schools in Dubai, where he was a quick learner. Later he was granted a scholarship to the United States to study chemical engineering, but decided instead to study law.

He attended the United Arab Emirates University, Faculty of Law in 1981 and graduated with excellence in 1985 with a bachelor's degree in law and a minor in political science. While at university he was an administrative body of the Emirates National Students Union.

In 1985 Al-Rukn attended Warwick University and graduated with a degree in constitutional law. In 1992 he completed his Ph.D. in constitutional law from the same university.

== Al Islah and incarceration ==
Al-Rukn had defended members of al-Islah, a Muslim Brotherhood affiliated group. In 2011 he served as co-defense counsel for two of the activists, known as the UAE 5, who were imprisoned for seven months prosecuted for defamation and allegedly posting statements on an internet forum critical of the UAE's leaders and government policies. Government authorities have long prevented al-Rukn from lecturing at Al Ain University due to his outspoken views on the UAE government.

Dr. Al-Rukn was arrested on July 17, 2012 for being part of Al Islah, a group that has allegedly planned to organize a coup against the UAE government.

On May 27, 2017, he was designated as the prizewinner of the 22nd Ludovic Trarieux International Human Rights Prize.
