= Louise Lamarre Proulx =

Tax Court of Canada

Louise Lamarre Proulx retired in 2008 as a judge on the Tax Court of Canada.
