= Hasan Yousefi Eshkevari =

Iranian cleric and reformer (b. 1949)

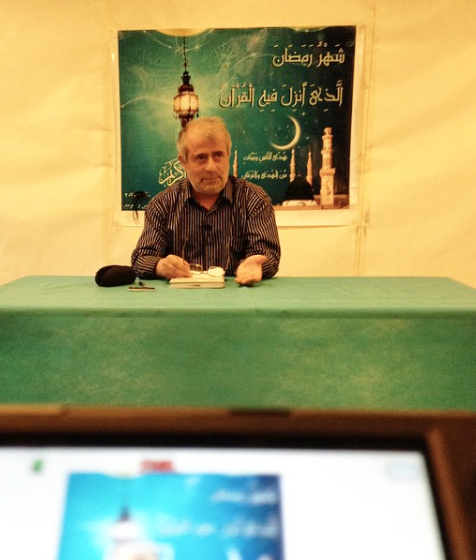

Member of the Parliament
- In office 28 May 1980 – 28 May 1984
- Constituency: Tonekabon
- Majority: 31,713 (73.5%)

Personal details
- Born: 11 August 1949 (age 77)
- Party: Nationalist–Religious

Hasan Yousefi Eshkevari (Persian: حسن یوسفی اشکوری, born 11 August 1949) is an Iranian cleric, researcher, journalist, reformist and former political prisoner. He has been described as "an active supporter of the revolution" who became "an outspoken and influential critic of the current Iranian version of theocracy."

== Career ==
Eshkevari was the founder and director of the Ali Shariati Research Centre. He was also contributing editor of the newspaper Iran-e Farda, which was banned in April 2000. He was a prolific contributor to the Great Islamic Encyclopedia, and an editor of the Encyclopedia of the Shia, both edited in Tehran.

== Controversy ==
On 5 August 2000, Eshkevari was arrested after returning from the 'Iran After the Elections' Conference held in Berlin 7–9 April 2000, in Berlin, Germany. At the conference, Eshkevari was quoted as saying

Even if Khatami ... should be defeated in his work ... this time not only has democracy become the first priority, but there is an unprecedented consensus among the intellectual and the political elites ... the historical time of despotism is over in Iran.

Eshkevari's trial was held behind closed doors between 7 and 17 October 2000 in the Special Court for the Clergy. He is believed to have been convicted of "acting against national security" in connection with a speech he gave at the conference, "defaming government officials in articles", "starting a campaign against the system", and "denying and insulting the holy religion of Islam". He was also permanently defrocked. In addition he was charged with "declaring war on God", "being corrupt on earth" (Mofsed-e-filarz), and apostasy – all of which carry the death penalty – but these three charges were overturned.

New charges of 'propaganda against the Islamic Republic', 'insulting top-rank officials', 'spreading lies', were filed against him at the Special Court for the Clergy, in 2002, for which he received a sentence of seven years' imprisonment on 17 October. He served four years in prison before and after his conviction, being released on 6 February 2005. During the crackdown on protests over the 2009 presidential elections in Iran, Eshkevari fled to Germany to seek political asylum.

== Views ==
Eshkevari spoke out against the 2009 presidential elections, which, he is convinced, were rigged.

In 2010, he advocated a secular governmental system in Iran, for which, he suggests, the original draft of the 1979 constitution could serve as a blueprint. In 2011 at a conference of Iran scholars and experts in Berlin, he attacked the Ahmadinejad administration, stating that it had "crossed almost all political and religious lines," and that the Iranian government was so deeply at odds with Shia tradition, it ultimately threatening to "destroy Islam, the government and the country."

Some of his work on Islamic democratic government were featured in a book titled Islam and Democracy in Iran: Eshkevari and the Quest for Reform (Library of Modern Middle East Studies) First Edition (ISBN 978-1-845-11133-5) by Ziba Mir-Hosseini and Richard Tapper, 2006. Other publications that featured some of his work include:

- Akbar, Ali; Saeed, Abdullah (2019). Contemporary Approaches to the Qurʾan and its Interpretation in Iran. Routledge. p. 13. doi:10.4324/9780367272067-6. ISBN 978-0-367-27206-7. S2CID 212858066.
- Eshkevari, Hassan Yousefi; Mir-Hosseini, Ziba; Tapper, Richard (2006). Islam and Democracy in Iran: Eshkevari and the Quest for Reform (Library of Modern Middle East Studies). Bloomsbury Academic. p. 250. ISBN 978-1-845-11134-2.

== Works ==
(in Persian)

- A Hundred Years of Iranian History 1879–1979 (Qom 1974)
- Justice in the Monotheistic Worldview (Qom 1975)
- Broken Idols: An Analysis of the Foundations of Twentieth Century Civilization (Qom 1977)
- A Review of the Study of Creation: Issues in Islamic Anthropology (Tehran 1997)
- Religious Revivalism: Analysis and Criticism of the Contemporary Islamic Movement: Interviews with ten political-cultural figures (Tehran, first edition 1998, second edition 1999)
- Wisdom in the Feast of Religion (Tehran 2000)
- Remembering the Days: Political Approaches of the Reformist Movement in Iran (Tehran 2000)
- Solitary Reflections: A Prelude to Iranian Hermeneutics (2003)
- A Critique of Religious Discourse ( a translation of a book by Nasr Abu Zaid) (2004)
- Letters from Prison to my Daughters (2004)
- Eshkevari, Hasan Yousefi (2007). NO HORSEMAN EMERGED FROM THE DUST. New Thought Press. p. 500. ISBN 978-3-948-89402-3.

== See also ==
- Apostasy in Islam
- Human rights in Iran
- 'Iran After the Elections' Conference

== External links/Further reading ==
- PEN, Hojjatoleslam Hasan Yousefi Eshkevari
- Hassan Yousefi Eshkevari: The Iranian Election is Invalid
- Essay by Hassan Yousefi Eshkevari, Political Islam and violence
- Profile: International Cities of Refuge Network
- Essay: God's Uprooted Warriors
- Hasan Yousefi Eshkevari, WorldCat
- Hasan Yousefi Eshkevari Archives, Iran Press Watch
- Witness Statement of Hasan Yousefi Eshkevari, Iranrights.org
- Eshkevari Published Books List
- Authors: Hasan Yousefi Eshkevari. Qantara.de
