= Joanne Hershfield =

American author, filmmaker and professor (born 1950)

- Born: 1950 (age 75–76); Winnipeg, Manitoba, Canada
- Education: Stanford University; University of Texas at Austin
- Occupations: Author; Filmmaker; Professor
- Known for: New Day Films
- Website: newday.com

Joanne Hershfield (born 1950) is an author, filmmaker, and professor. Her expertise includes gender, feminism, and film in the United States and Mexico.

== Biography ==
Hershfield was born in Winnipeg, Manitoba, Canada, in 1950. She received her MA in documentary film production at Stanford University and her PhD at the University of Texas at Austin in 1993, in radio, television, and film.

Hershfield is currently professor emerita within the Women's and Gender Studies department at the University of North Carolina at Chapel Hill; she has previously worked as an assistant professor in the department of Communication Studies. She has been employed at the university since 1994. Hershfield also participated as a U.S. Scholar with the Telling Our Stories of Home conference in 2016. A portion of her upcoming film on Benevolence Farm, a transitional housing project for formerly incarcerated women, was screened at the conference.

== Filmography ==
Hershfield is a producer, director, and editor of documentaries with New Day Films. Her past works include:

- Between Two Worlds: a Japanese Pilgrimage (co-produced with Susan Caperna Lloyd, 1992)
- Leading Women (1998). Leading Women is a product of the Women's Leadership and Grassroots Activism project, which is conducted by the Southern Oral History Program.
- Nuestra Comunidad: Latinos in North Carolina (co-produced with Penny Simpson, 2001), an examination of the rapidly expanding Spanish-speaking population in the 'new south'.
- Women in Japan: Memories of the Past, Dreams of the Future (with Jan Bardsley, 2002), a film which tells the stories of six different Japanese women to disrupt Western stereotypes of Japanese women as geisha, good wives, and wise mothers.
- Mama C: Urban Warrior in the African Bush (2002), the story of Charlotte O'Neal (wife of Pete O'Neal), a poet, musician, artist, community activist, and former member of the Kansas City Black Panther Party, who lived for forty years as an 'urban warrior' in the Tanzanian village of Imbaseni.
- The Gillian Film (2006), the story of a young women with developmental disabilities whose endeavor to leave home conflicts with her mother's difficulty letting go.
- Men Are Human, Women Are Buffalo (2008), which tells five stories of violence against women in Thailand through a mix of interviews and puppetry.
- These Are Our Children (2011). An examination of how local grassroots interventions are reducing the effects of poverty, HIV/AIDS, and violence on Kenyan children, These Are Our Children won Best Feature Documentary at the Athens International Film and Video Festival (2011). It was screened at COMMFEST Global Community Film Festival (2011) and San Diego Black Film Festival (2011).

== Bibliography ==
- Joanne Hershfield (2000). The Invention of Dolores Del Río. ISBN 978-0-8166-3409-5.
- Joanne Hershfield (June 2008). Imagining la Chica Moderna: Women, Nation, and Visual Culture in Mexico, 1917–1936. ISBN 978-0-8223-4238-0.
- Joanne Hershfield (1996). Mexican Cinema/Mexican Woman, 1940-1950. University of Arizona Press. ISBN 9780816516377.
- Joanne Hershfield and David R. Maciel. Mexico's Cinema: A Century of Film and Filmmakers. Rowman & Littlefield. ISBN 978-0-8420-2682-6.
