= Réal Favreau =

Canadian judge

Tax Court of Canada
- Incumbent
- Assumed office October 27, 2006

Réal Favreau is a judge currently serving on the Tax Court of Canada. He took office on October 27, 2006.
