= Karinna Moskalenko =

Russian human rights lawyer

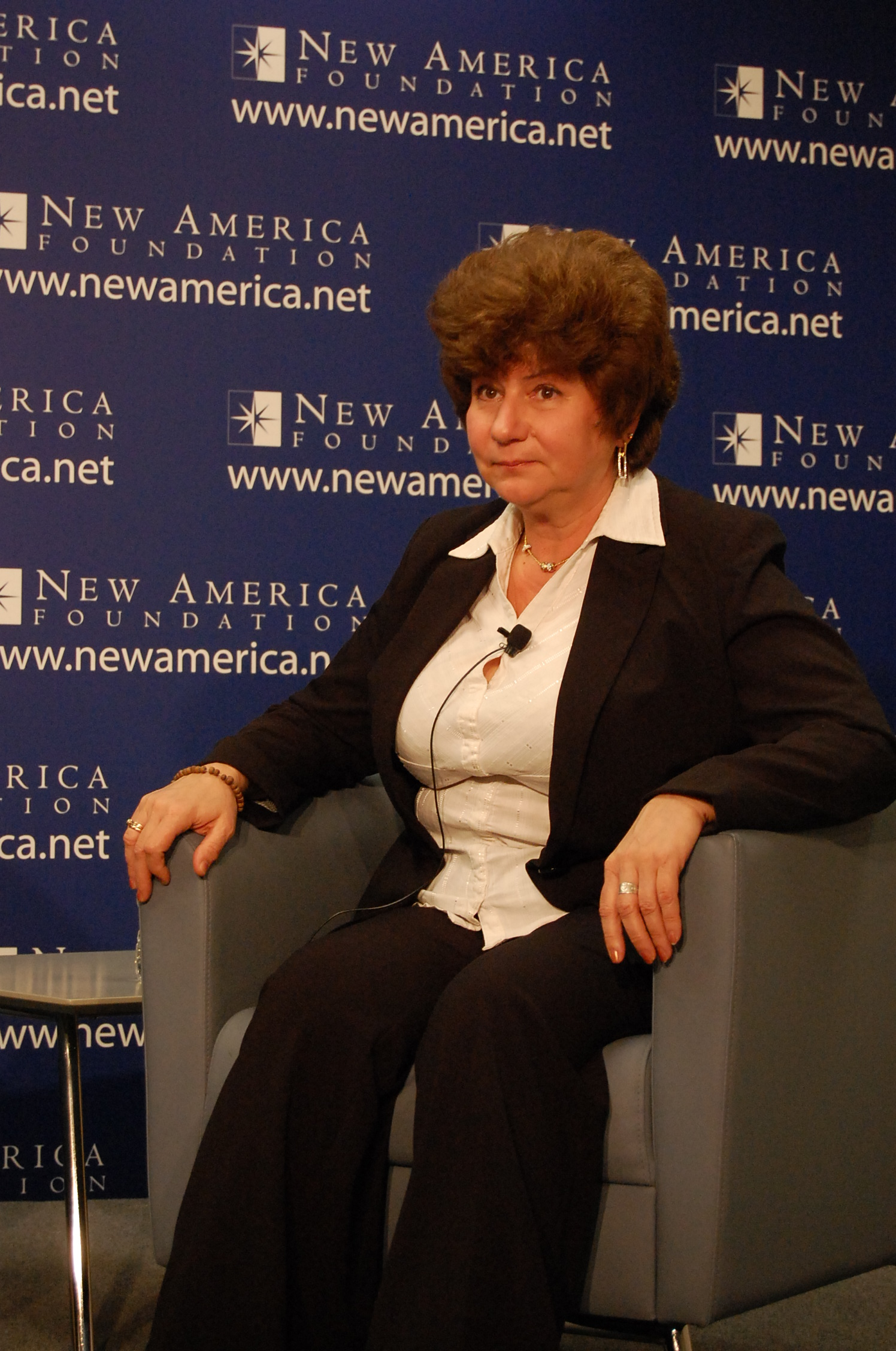
Moskalenko in 2010

Karinna Akopovna Muskalenko (Russian: Кари́нна Ако́повна Москале́нко) (born February 20, 1950, in Paris, France, USSR) is Russia's leading human rights lawyer, the president of the International Association of Russian Lawyers (French: Association Internationale d'Avocats Russes) with headquarters in Strasbourg and a member of Moscow Helsinki Group who defended, amongst others, Mikhail Khodorkovsky, Garry Kasparov and Alexander Litvinenko. She won the first ever case against Russian Federation heard in public hearings of the European Court of Human Rights.

== Human Rights Advocate ==
Moskalenko studied law at Leningrad State University (graduated in 1976) and later specialized in Human Rights at the University of Birmingham in the UK (graduated in 1994). She and her team at Moscow’s International Protection Centre have won 27 cases against the Russian government at the European Court of Human Rights in Strasbourg and have more than 100 applications pending.

Russian Prosecutor-General initiated a case to disbar Moskalenko on the grounds of having negligently defended Mikhail Khodorkovsky, the former owner of Yukos. However, Moscow Collegium of advocates, which rules on such cases, decided the case to be politically motivated and allowed her to continue the practice Khodorkovsky himself has made no complaint and has declared himself “fully satisfied” with Moskalenko’s work.

Moskalenko is also on the International Advisory Board of the Media Legal Defence Initiative, a UK-based charity that provides legal aid and assistance to journalists and news media organizations around the world, supports training in media law and promotes the exchange of information, litigation tools and strategies for lawyers working on media freedom cases.

In 2010, she was the fifteenth prize-winner of Ludovic-Trarieux International Human Rights Prize ("The award given by lawyers to a lawyer"), reserved each year to a lawyer who thoroughout his or her career has illustrated, by activity or suffering, the defence of human rights in the world.

== Poisoning by mercury ==
On 10 April 2004, her husband had discovered “about 10 little pellets of liquid metal” in their car, "on the floor of both the driver and the passenger sides of the vehicle". Toxicologists identified the metal as poisonous mercury, which Moskalenko claimed was an apparent effort to poison her family and prevent her from appearing in court in Moscow. She said she became sick two days before she was scheduled to appear at a preliminary hearing in Moscow on the murder of journalist and Kremlin critic Anna Politkovskaya.

On 22 October 2004, it was reported that French police investigating the case managed to find the previous owner, who gave a statement that he broke a mercury barometer in the car shortly before selling it to Moskalenko. Peter Lavelle, a journalist for Russia Today stated that Moskalenko admits she had not cleaned the car since she bought it from the antiques dealer in August 2008. The revelation came ten days after the initial report, which saw Kremlin critics and some media outlets, including the Committee to Protect Journalists, Lev Ponomaryov, the Washington Post, and The Globe and Mail, accusing Russian security services, and Vladimir Putin himself, of orchestrating the poisoning in an attempt to intimidate or eliminate the vocal critic of the Kremlin.

== See also ==
Viktor Kalashnikov and Marina Kalashnikova - journalists who claim to have been poisoned with mercury by the Russian authorities

== Internal links ==
- Her official biography (Russian)
