= Campbell J. Miller =

Tax Court of Canada
- Incumbent
- Assumed office January 11, 2001

Personal details
- Education: Cambridge University

Campbell J. Miller is a judge serving on the Tax Court of Canada since 2001.
