= Giuffre =

Giuffrè, generally spelled as Giuffre in English, is an Italian surname from Sicily. Notable people with the surname include:

- Adriana Giuffrè (1939–2023), Italian actress
- Aldo Giuffrè (1924–2010), Italian actor and comedian
- Antonino Giuffrè (born 1945), Italian former mafioso
- Carlo Giuffrè (1928–2018), Italian actor, brother of Aldo
- Francesco Giuffrè (born 1972), Italian composer, voice actor, screenwriter and theatre director, son of Carlo
- Gaetano Giuffrè (1918–2018), Italian-Greek composer
- Jimmy Giuffre (1921–2008), American composer, arranger and musician
- Martin Giuffre (born 1990), Canadian badminton player
- Matthew Giuffre (born 1982), Canadian squash player
- Virginia Giuffre (1983–2025), American-Australian woman who accused Jeffrey Epstein and his associates of rape

== See also ==
- Giufre
- Giofrè
