= Joe E. Hershfield =

Canadian judge

Joe E. Hershfield is a judge who served on the Tax Court of Canada from 2000 to 2016.
