= Lucie Lamarre =

Tax Court of Canada
- Incumbent
- Assumed office June 18, 1993

Personal details
- Education: Université de Sherbrooke

Lucie Lamarre was a judge of the Tax Court of Canada. She was appointed in 1993 and became Associate Chief Justice of the Court in 2015. She retired as Associate Chief Justice and from the Court in 2021.

Lamarre was born in Montréal, Quebec, graduated from the Collège Marie de France with a Bachelor’s degree in Health Sciences in 1975, from the Université de Montréal with a LL.B. in 1978, and from the Université de Sherbrooke with a LL.M in Tax Law in 1981.

She was called to the Quebec Bar in 1981. She practiced with the firm Stikeman Elliott in Montréal in 1982-1983 before joining the federal Department of Justice as Counsel in Montréal in 1984.
