= Mehrangiz Kar =

Iranian lawyer (born 1944)

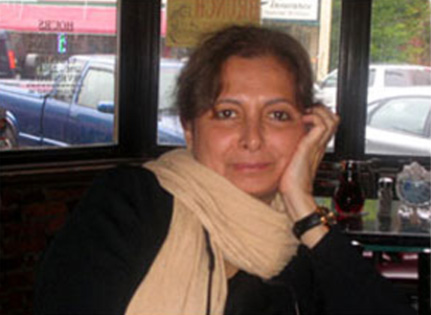
Mehrangiz Kar

Mehrangiz Kar (Persian: مهرانگیز کار; born 10 October 1944 Ahvaz, Iran), a human rights lawyer from Iran, is an internationally recognized writer, speaker and activist who advocates for the defense of women’s rights and human rights in Iran and throughout the Islamic world. A common theme in her work is the tension between Iranian law and the core principles of human rights and human dignity. She is also author of the book Crossing the Red Line, and an activist of women's rights in Iran. Born in 1944 at Ahvaz, in southern Iran, she attended the College of Law and Political Science at Teheran University. After graduating, she worked for Sazman-e Ta’min-e Ejtemaii (the Institute of Social Security) and published over 100 articles on social and political issues.

She was one of the first women attorneys to oppose the Islamization of gender relations following the Iranian Revolution of 1979. Kar has been an active public defender in Iran’s civil and criminal courts and has lectured extensively, both in Iran and abroad, on political, legal and constitutional reform, promotion of civil society and democracy, and on dismantling legal barriers to women’s and children’s rights.

== Biography ==
She was arrested on 29 April 2000, for participating in a Berlin academic conference on political and social reform in Iran with leading Iranian writers and intellectuals. She was tried behind closed doors with no right to a lawyer and sentenced to four years in prison on grotesque and arbitrary charges such as "actions contrary to national security" and "violating the Islamic dress code."

She was released on bail before going to trial on medical conditions and then traveled to the United States for breast cancer treatment. Her husband, Siamak Pourzand, who was also an outspoken critic of the regime, vanished after she left, and Mehrangiz faced intense pressure from Teheran to keep her lips quiet. She attempted to obtain information about her husband through official agencies and human rights organizations, as well as her and her daughters Leila and Azadeh's appeals to foreign radio and television networks, were unsuccessful. Mr. Pourzand was found in the Islamic Republic's jails some weeks after his disappearance, charged with spying and harming national security. The Tehran Press Court condemned him to eight years in prison on May 3, 2002. In the interim, on January 8, 2002, Mehrangiz Kar's final sentence was lowered to six months in prison.

She has been a scholar at the Woodrow Wilson International Center for Scholars and a Reagan-Fascell Democracy Fellow of the National Endowment for Democracy’s International Forum for Democratic Studies.

Kar was a Radcliffe Fellow at Harvard University and in the 2005/06 academic year was based at the Carr Center for Human Rights Policy at Harvard's John F. Kennedy School of Government.

She has also been recognized as a Scholar at Risk through an international network of universities and colleges working to promote academic freedom and to defend the human rights of scholars worldwide. She currently works in Pembroke Center for Teaching and Research on Women in Brown University. She is also an instructor of courses on women's rights in Iran at Tavaana: E-Learning Institute for Iranian Civil Society.

In 2002, the U.S. First Lady, Laura Bush, gave her the National Endowment for Democracy's Democracy award.

She is the widow of Siamak Pourzand, a fellow Iranian dissident and former prisoner of conscience who committed suicide on 29 April 2011, after a long period of torture and imprisonment.

== Bibliography ==
- Children of Addiction: Social and Legal Position of the Children of Addicted Parents, Iran, 1990.
- Quest for identity: The Image of Iranian Women in Prehistory and History,
- Angel of Justice and Patches of Hell, a collection of essays on the status and position of women in pre- and post-revolutionary Iran.
- Women in the Iranian Labor Market, 1994
- Legal Structure of the Family System in Iran.
- Mehrangiz, Kar (2003). "The Invasion of the Private Sphere in Iran". Social Research. 70 (3): 829–836. ISSN 0037-783X.
- Mehrangiz, Kar (2007). "Iranian Law and Women's Rights". Muslim World Journal of Human Rights. 4 (1): 1–13. doi:10.2202/1554-4419.1113.

== Awards and honours ==
- 2004 Recipient of the annual Human Rights First (formerly Lawyers Committee For Human Rights) Human Rights Award
- 2002 Ludovic-Trarieux International Human Rights Prize (France) for a lawyer working to promote women’s human rights, awarded jointly by the Human Rights Institute of the Bar of Bordeaux and the European Lawyers Union.
- 2002 Democracy Award of the National Endowment for Democracy (U.S.), for advancing human rights and democracy.
- 2002 Hellman/Hammett Grant from Human Rights Watch (International) for a writer who is a target of political persecution.
- 2001 Vasyl Stus Freedom-to-Write Award of PEN New England (Massachusetts, U.S.), for a writer who has struggled in the face of oppression and brutality to make her voice heard.
- 2000 Oxfam Novib/PEN Award of PEN Clube (Netherlands), for writers who have lost their liberty for political and ideological reasons.
- 2000 Donna Dell’anno Award of the Conseil De Lavallee Consiglio Regionale Della Valle D’aosta (Italy), for persevering in the fight for freedom and the defense of women’s rights.
- 2000 Latifeh Yarshater Award of the Society for Iranian Studies (U.S.), for the best book on Iranian women.
- 1975 Forough Faroukhzad Award (Iran), for best article.

== See also ==
- Shirin Ebadi
- Bibi Khatoon Astarabadi
- Iranian women
- List of famous Persian women
