= Tax Court of Canada =

Federal superior court

- Established: 1983
- Jurisdiction: Canada
- Location: Centennial Towers, 200 Kent Street, Ottawa, Ontario
- Authorized by: Tax Court of Canada Act
- Appeals to: Federal Court of Appeal
- Website: Tax Court Homepage

Chief Justice
- Currently: Gabrielle St-Hilaire
- Since: June 17, 2024

The Tax Court of Canada (TCC; French: Cour canadienne de l'impôt), established in 1983 by the Tax Court of Canada Act, is a federal superior court which deals with matters involving companies or individuals and tax issues with the Government of Canada.

== Jurisdiction ==
Appeals of decisions of the Tax Court of Canada are exclusively within the jurisdiction of the Federal Court of Appeal. On occasion, the Supreme Court of Canada grants leave to appeal a federal tax case from a decision of the Federal Court of Appeal where the question involved is considered to be of public importance.

== Procedure ==
The litigation of a federal tax dispute is commenced by a taxpayer filing a Notice of Appeal in the Tax Court of Canada. Cases may proceed either by way of Informal or General Procedure. The Informal Procedure is a simplified process available to taxpayers where the total tax and penalties (but not interest) at issue is CAD$25,000 or less per taxation year ($50,000 in the case of GST).

In General Procedure cases, discoveries are held by exchange of documents followed by the examination, without a judge, of one witness on behalf of each party. One or both parties may then apply for a hearing date where witnesses will be examined and cross-examined before a judge and documents formally entered into evidence. Trials in the Tax Court of Canada typically take one day or less, particularly where the parties have agreed on all or substantially all of the facts, but in more complex and contentious cases the trial may not be completed for several weeks or even months.

In the Tax Court of Canada, the onus is generally on the taxpayer to prove its case on a balance of probabilities, except in respect of civil penalties where the Canada Revenue Agency carries the burden of proof. Generally, the Minister of National Revenue is represented by specialized tax litigation counsel from the Department of Justice.

The decision whether, and on what basis, to settle any particular case is made on a collaborative basis between the Canada Revenue Agency and the Department of Justice. Settlements are generally based on a principled approach to the matter rather than strictly as a percentage of the dollar amount at stake. This differs from the rules of general civil litigation, but it does offer the opportunity to develop creative settlement strategies particularly where multiple taxation years or issues are involved.

In granting judgment in favour of a taxpayer, the Tax Court of Canada may order the Minister of National Revenue to reassess on the basis described by the judge in the reasons for judgment or, where the assessment or reassessment is wholly incorrect, the assessment or reassessment may be vacated entirely.

Costs are recoverable by the successful party in accordance with rather modest tariff amounts, but reasonable disbursements incurred by the successful party (including expert witness costs) are generally fully recoverable.

== Judges ==
Chief Judge

Gabrielle St-Hilaire

Associate Chief Judge

Anick Pelletier

Judges (in order of seniority)

- Pierre Archambault (supernumerary)
- Alain Tardif (supernumerary)
- Diane Campbell (supernumerary)
- Campbell J. Miller (supernumerary)
- Brent Paris
- Judith Woods
- Réal Favreau
- Gaston Jorré
- Patrick J. Boyle
- Valerie Miller
- Robert J. Hogan
- Steven K. D'Arcy
- Frank J. Pizzitelli
- Johanne D'Auray
- David Graham
- Kathleen T. Lyons
- John R. Owen
- Dominique Lafleur
- Sylvain Ouimet
- Don R. Sommerfeldt
- Henry A. Visser
- Guy R. Smith
- Bruce Russell

Deputy Judges (alphabetical order)

- D.W. Rowe
- N. Weisman

== Former judges ==
- Eric A. Bowie, Judge (1995-2019)
- Alban Garon, Chief Justice (1988-2004)
- Joe E. Hershfield, Judge (2000–2016)
- Terrence O'Connor
- Louise Lamarre Proulx, Judge (retired 2008)
- The Honourable Lucie Lamarre (retired 2021)

== Coat of arms ==
Coat of arms of the Federal Court
Crest Two maple branches in saltire issuant from a coronet rimmed Purpure set with snowflakes Argent Escutcheon Argent semé of maple leaves, on a chief Purpure a balance of four pans Argent, all within a bordure chequy Argent and Purpure Supporters Two winged lions Or, that to the dexter female, that to the sinister male, both attired of bighorn sheep rams’ horns and sejant on stone steps Argent set with books and maple leaves Purpure Motto ACCESSIBILITAS • LIBERTAS • ÆQUABILITAS (Latin for 'Accessibility • Independence • Impartiality')
