= List of members of the Order of Nova Scotia =

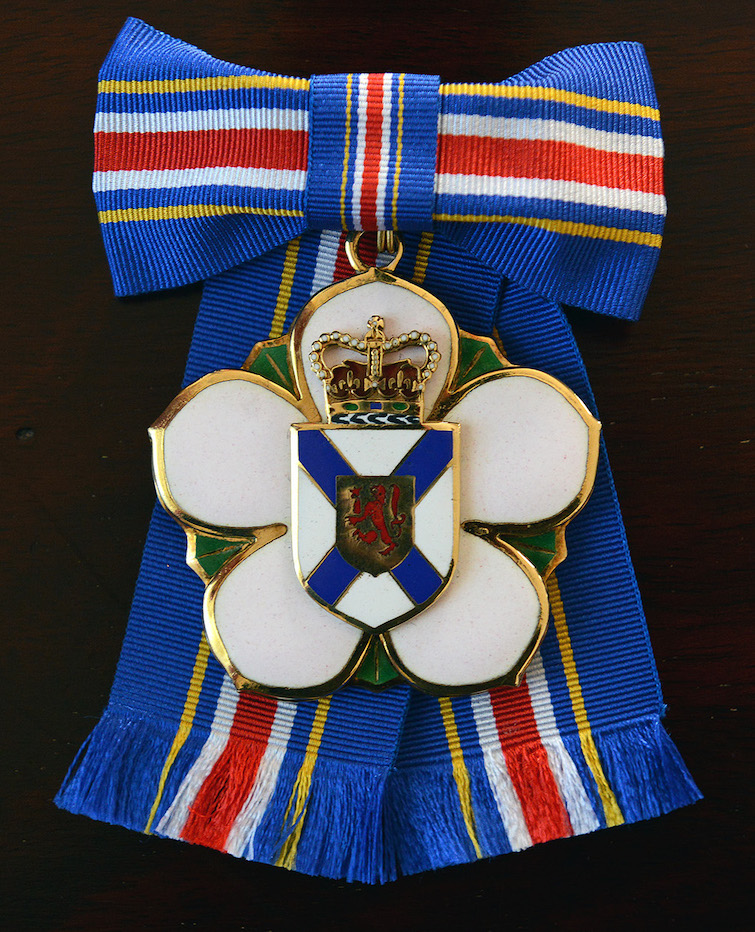
Insignia of the Order of Nova Scotia on a bow

Ribbon bar of the order

The Order of Nova Scotia is a civilian honour for merit in the Canadian province of Nova Scotia. The order was instituted through the Order of Nova Scotia Act on 1 June 2001, with the first appointments beginning in 2002. The order is intended to honour current or former Nova Scotia residents who have demonstrated a high level of individual excellence and achievement, thus being described as the highest honour amongst all those conferred by the Nova Scotia Crown. The lieutenant governor is Chancellor of the order, and is responsible for inducting new members.

There are no limits on how many people can belong to the Order of Nova Scotia, although inductions are limited to six per year. It was initially limited to five inductions per year, and allowed for 10 inductions in its first year, in addition to the appointment of the four surviving previous Lieutenant Governors. In 2007, the Order of Nova Scotia Act was amended to include a youth category, in which a sixth candidate may be appointed provided they are at least 16 years old and under the age of 25.

As of 2026, there are 132 members of the Order of Nova Scotia.

== Members ==
List of members of the Order of Nova Scotia
| Name | Year | Residence | Position | Ref(s). |
|---|---|---|---|---|
| Carrie Best | 2002 | New Glasgow | Journalist and human rights activist | |
| John H. Boudreau | 2002 | Petit de Grat | Helped to save Isle Madame from economic collapse during the decline of the ground fishery | |
| Shirley R. Chernin | 2002 | Glace Bay/Sydney | Leader of the Citizens Service League in Glace Bay for over 30 years | |
| Lorne O. Clarke | 2002 | Halifax | Chief Justice of Nova Scotia | |
| Edith H. Cromwell | 2002 | Inglewood | First Black graduate of the Nova Scotia Teacher's College | |
| Marie Elwood | 2002 | Tantallon | Chief Curator of History at the Nova Scotia Museum from 1973 to 1992 | |
| James A. Kehoe | 2002 | Sydney | Owner of a Nova Scotia construction company | |
| Anne Murray | 2002 | Springhill/Thornhill | Internationally recognized musician | |
| Daniel N. Paul | 2002 | Halifax | Writer on the history of the Mi'kmaq | |
| John Savage | 2002 | Dartmouth | Premier of Nova Scotia | |
| Alan Abraham | 2002 | Halifax | Lieutenant Governor of Nova Scotia | |
| Lloyd Crouse | 2002 | Lunenburg | Lieutenant Governor of Nova Scotia | |
| John James Kinley | 2002 | Lunenburg | Lieutenant Governor of Nova Scotia | |
| Myra Freeman | 2002 | Halifax | Lieutenant Governor of Nova Scotia | |
| Arnold Burden | 2003 | Springhill | First doctor to go underground during the 1956 Springhill mining disasters | |
| Alex Colville | 2003 | Wolfville | Painter and printmaker | |
| Shirley Elliott | 2003 | Wolfville | Legislative librarian of Nova Scotia from 1954 to 1982 | |
| Buddy MacMaster | 2003 | Judique | Cape Breton fiddler | |
| Sister Dorothy Moore | 2003 | Sydney Mines | Mi'kmaq educator and Elder | |
| Anne Marie Comeau | 2004 | Saulnierville | Director of the La Baie en Joie Dance Group | |
| Donald Michael Julien | 2004 | Millbrook | Director of the Confederacy of Mainland Mi'kmaq | |
| Marial M. Mosher | 2004 | Halifax | Professor at Mount Saint Vincent University | |
| Oscar Shiu-Yet Wong | 2004 | Halifax | Radiation oncologist | |
| Sherman Zwicker | 2004 | Lunenburg | Mayor of Lunenburg | |
| Constance Glube | 2005 | Halifax | Chief Justice of Nova Scotia | |
| Rita MacNeil | 2005 | Big Pond/Sydney | Musician from Cape Breton | |
| Theresa McNeil | 2005 | Upper Granville | High Sheriff of Annapolis County | |
| Cyril Reddy | 2005 | Antigonish | Directed Community Services and the Children's Aid Society in Pictou County | |
| Jack Yazer | 2005 | Sydney | Founding chairman of the Cape Breton Regional Hospital | |
| George Elliott Clarke | 2006 | Toronto/Three Mile Plains | Poet, playwright, and scholar | |
| Joan Dillon | 2006 | Antigonish | Co-founder of the St. FX Project at St. Francis Xavier University | |
| Ian Simon Fraser | 2006 | River John | Director of the Royal Nova Scotia International Tattoo | |
| Alida de Jong Greenaway | 2006 | Dartmouth | History researcher and linguist | |
| Ron Stewart | 2006 | Halifax | Career in emergency medicine | |
| Mayann Francis | 2006 | Halifax | Lieutenant Governor of Nova Scotia | |
| Joyce Barkhouse | 2007 | Bridgewater | Children's writer and educator | |
| Peter Stephen Clarke | 2007 | Woodville | Known for his contributions to agriculture | |
| Tom Forrestall | 2007 | Dartmouth | Painter | |
| Flora MacDonald | 2007 | North Sydney | Secretary of State for External Affairs | |
| William D. Stanish | 2007 | Halifax | Orthopedic surgeon | |
| Nora Bernard | 2008 | Millbrook | Mi'kmaq activist | |
| Sidney Crosby | 2008 | Cole Harbour | Ice hockey player | |
| Ruth Goldbloom | 2008 | Halifax | Directed the restoration of Pier 21 | |
| Michael Dan MacNeil | 2008 | Jamesville | Founder of a Cape Breton forestry company | |
| Thomas John Murray | 2008 | Halifax | Dean of Medicine at Dalhousie University | |
| Mahmood Ali Naqvi | 2008 | Sydney | Vascular surgeon in Cape Breton | |
| Michael Baker | 2009 | Lunenburg | Nova Scotia MLA and cabinet minister | |
| Melvin James Boutilier | 2009 | Halifax | Founder of the Community Care Network food bank in Halifax | |
| Muriel Duckworth | 2009 | Bedford | Women's rights activist | |
| Philip Riteman | 2009 | Bedford | Auschwitz survivor | |
| Viola Marie Robinson | 2009 | Truro | Mi'kmaq activist | |
| J. Chalmers Doane | 2010 | South Maitland | Music educator | |
| James Herbert Leonard Hill | 2010 | Dartmouth | Co-founder of the Christmas Daddies Telethon | |
| Rocky Jones | 2010 | Halifax | Founder of the Black United Front of Nova Scotia | |
| Eva June Landry | 2010 | St. Peter's | First female Inspector of Schools in Nova Scotia | |
| William Robert Pope | 2010 | Mount Denson | Founder of the Windsor Elms Senior Home | |
| Wayne Adams | 2011 | East Preston | First Black Nova Scotian MLA | |
| Judson Graham Day | 2011 | Hantsport | Chancellor of Dalhousie University | |
| Bruce MacKinnon | 2011 | Halifax | Cartoonist | |
| Joseph Benjamin Marshall | 2011 | Eskasoni | Mi'kmaq rights activist | |
| Budge Wilson | 2011 | Halifax | Writer | |
| John James Grant | 2011 | New Glasgow | Lieutenant Governor of Nova Scotia | |
| Silver Donald Cameron | 2012 | Halifax | Writer and Dean of Cape Breton University | |
| Graham W. Dennis | 2012 | Halifax | Publisher | |
| Alexa McDonough | 2012 | Halifax | Leader of the Nova Scotia New Democratic Party and the federal New Democratic Party | |
| Robert Morgan | 2012 | Sydney | Historian and archivist in Cape Breton | |
| Bridglal Pachai | 2012 | Halifax | Professor, writer, and human rights activist | |
| Eldon George | 2013 | Parrsboro | Geologist who discovered the world's smallest dinosaur footprints | |
| Fred George | 2013 | Bedford | Businessman and philanthropist | |
| Ed Kinley | 2013 | Halifax | Cardiovascular surgeon | |
| Hetty van Gurp | 2013 | Halifax | Founder of Peaceful Schools International | |
| Raylene Marguerite Rankin | 2013 | Halifax and Mabou | Lawyer and singer-songwriter | |
| Walter Borden | 2014 | New Glasgow | Actor, poet, and playwright | |
| Richard Goldbloom | 2014 | Halifax | Pediatrician | |
| Stan Kutcher | 2014 | Herring Cove | Psychiatrist | |
| Wanda Thomas Bernard | 2014 | East Preston | Social worker and educator | |
| Ruth Holmes Whitehead | 2014 | Halifax | Ethnologist at the Nova Scotia Museum | |
| Margaret Macdonald Casey | 2015 | Halifax | Physician in North End Halifax | |
| Louis Deveau | 2015 | Dartmouth | Founder of Acadian Seaplants Limited | |
| Martin Rudy Haase | 2015 | Chester | Environmentalist | |
| Sharon Hope Irwin | 2015 | Sydney | Childcare director | |
| Alistair MacLeod | 2015 | Dunvegan | Novelist, short story writer and academic | |
| Francoise Baylis | 2016 | Halifax | Bioethicist | |
| Freeman Douglas Knockwood | 2016 | Indian Brook | Mi'kmaq Elder | |
| Arthur B. McDonald | 2016 | Sydney/Kingston | Astrophysicist | |
| James Leonard Morrow | 2016 | Windsor | Director of the Mermaid Theatre of Nova Scotia | |
| Donald R. Reid | 2016 | Joggins | Fossil collector for the Joggins Fossil Centre | |
| Bradford J. Barton | 2017 | Dartmouth | Educator | |
| Geraldine Marjorie Browning | 2017 | Centreville | President of the Valley African Nova Scotian Development Association | |
| R. Irene d'Entremont | 2017 | Yarmouth | President of ITG Information Management Inc. | |
| Ray Ivany | 2017 | Wolfville | President of Acadia University | |
| Peter J.M. Nicholson | 2017 | Annapolis Royal | Science and technology | |
| Arthur LeBlanc | 2017 | Halifax | Lieutenant Governor of Nova Scotia | |
| Ellie Black | 2018 | Dartmouth | Olympic gymnast | |
| John Bragg | 2018 | Oxford | President of Oxford Frozen Foods and past Chancellor of Mount Allison University | |
| Clotilda Douglas-Yakimchuk | 2018 | Whitney Pier | First Black Canadian to graduate from the Nova Scotia Hospital School of Nursing, and the first Black president of the Registered Nurses' Association of Nova Scotia | |
| Janet Kitz | 2018 | Halifax | Historian recognized as an authority on the Halifax Explosion | |
| Patti Ann Melanson | 2018 | Halifax | Nurse and activist | |
| Wade Smith | 2018 | Halifax | Educator, coach, and advocate for preserving African Nova Scotian culture | |
| Elizabeth Cromwell | 2019 | Birchtown | African Nova Scotian heritage activist | |
| Francis Dorrington | 2019 | New Glasgow | Public servant | |
| Noni MacDonald | 2019 | Halifax | Pediatrician | |
| Ann MacLean | 2019 | Ingonish Beach | Social worker and therapist | |
| David M. McKeage | 2019 | Halifax | Founder of Brigadoon Village | |
| Linda Best | 2020 | Wolfville | Founder of FarmWorks Investment Co-operative | |
| Stella Bowles | 2020 | Bridgewater | Environmentalist and public speaker | |
| David Glenn Fountain | 2020 | Halifax | Businessman and philanthropist | |
| Natalie MacMaster | 2020 | Lakefield, ON | Gaelic fiddler from Cape Breton | |
| Donald Oliver | 2020 | Queens County | Senator and founding chairman of the Black Cultural Society | |
| Shawna Y. Paris-Hoyte | 2020 | Halifax | Lawyer and social worker | |
| Ronald Bourgeois | 2021 | Chéticamp | Musician | |
| Lee Cohen | 2021 | Halifax | Lawyer and social justice advocate | |
| Saeed El-Darahali | 2021 | Dartmouth | Businessman | |
| Paula Marshall | 2021 | Eskasoni | Mi'kmaq rights advocate | |
| Wanda Robson | 2021 | North Sydney | Human rights advocate | |
| John Boileau | 2022 | Bedford | Historian | |
| Kenzie MacNeil | 2022 | Sydney | Songwriter and performer | |
| Rustum Southwell | 2022 | Halifax | Businessman and founding director of the Black Business Initiative | |
| Robert Strang | 2022 | Fall River | Chief Medical Officer of Health of Nova Scotia, recognized for his leadership during the COVID-19 pandemic | |
| Hope Swinimer | 2022 | Seaforth | Founder of Hope for Wildlife | |
| Phil Comeau | 2023 | Saulnierville/Moncton | Film and television director | |
| Jacqueline Gahagan | 2023 | Halifax | Health researcher | |
| Bruce Guthro | 2023 | Sydney Mines | Singer-songwriter | |
| Sylvia Hamilton | 2023 | Grand-Pré | Filmmaker, writer, and educator | |
| Stephen Kimber | 2023 | Halifax | Writer, journalist, and educator | |
| Mike Savage | 2024 | Halifax | Lieutenant Governor of Nova Scotia | |
| Afua Cooper | 2024 | Halifax | Historian | |
| J. Michael MacDonald | 2024 | Halifax | Chief Justice of Nova Scotia | |
| Allan E. Marble | 2024 | Halifax | Medical historian and biomedical engineer | |
| Robert G. C. Sobey | 2024 | Stellarton | Businessman and philanthropist | |
| Joseph P. Shannon | 2024 | Port Hawkesbury | Businessman and philanthropist | |
| Darrell Dexter | 2025 | Liverpool | Former Premier of Nova Scotia | |
| John George Flemming | 2025 | Halifax | Businessman and philanthropist | |
| Rankin MacSween | 2025 | Ironville | Businessman and community leader | |
| Joel Plaskett | 2025 | Dartmouth | Artist and philanthropist | |
| Carolyn G. Thomas | 2025 | East Preston | Educator and human rights advocate | |
