= Corrine Sparks =

Canadian judge

- Born: Loon Lake, Nova Scotia
- Education: Mount Saint Vincent University; Schulich School of Law
- Occupations: Lawyer; Judge
- Years active: 1979—2021
- Known for: First black woman judge in Canada; First black judge in Nova Scotia

Corrine Etta Sparks OC is a Canadian judge. She was the first Black Canadian woman to become a judge in Canada, and the first black judge in the province of Nova Scotia. Her decision in the case R v S (RD), which was controversially overturned on appeal, was later upheld by the Supreme Court of Canada in a leading decision on reasonable apprehension of bias.

== Education ==
Sparks is from the area around Loon Lake, Nova Scotia, which is a historically racially segregated community. She was descended both from Black Loyalists and from Black Refugees to Nova Scotia. In 1971 Sparks matriculated at Mount Saint Vincent University, where she majored in economics with the intention of being a history teacher. While Sparks was a student, she volunteered as a probation officer at the Department of Justice, and took a summer job with the Nova Scotia Human Rights Commission. This legal experience prompted her to consider attending law school, and she was accepted to The Schulich School of Law at Dalhousie University, where in a class of 120 incoming students she was one of only 3 African Nova Scotians and the only black woman. Sparks graduated with an LLB degree in 1979.

After graduating from Dalhousie Law School, Sparks entered private legal practice in Dartmouth, Nova Scotia, where she worked in family law. The practice that Sparks ran with Helen Foote was the first all-female law firm in Nova Scotia.

In 2001, Sparks returned to Dalhousie Law School to obtain an LL.M degree. Her Masters Thesis studied the relocation and compensation of residents of Halifax's Africville, and was called The Construction and Deconstruction of Africville: A Case for Reparation.

== Career ==
On March 27, 1987, Sparks was appointed to the family court of Halifax, which made her the first black woman appointed to the Bench, and the first black judge in Nova Scotia. J. Michael MacDonald, the Chief Justice of the Nova Scotia Supreme Court, has noted that at the time of Sparks's appointment, the Canadian court system was slowly becoming more representative of local communities under the relatively new Canadian Charter of Rights and Freedoms.

In 1995, Sparks heard the case R v S (RD), in which a 15-year old black teenager was accused of hitting a police officer with his bicycle while the officer was attempting to arrest another person. Sparks acquitted the defendant, and in her decision she explicitly appealed to the "prevalent attitude of the day" as social context relevant to the ruling. The legal scholars Allan C. Hutchinson and Kathleen Strachan later summarized Sparks's specific finding in the case as follows: the police officer in question was acting in a context in which police officers have been known to overreact while dealing with non-white people, and certain claims by the defendant were believable in context, with the consequence that the Crown had not discharged its evidentiary burden to prove that all of the alleged offenses had occurred beyond a reasonable doubt. The Crown appealed Sparks's decision, focusing their case on the possible apprehension of bias, asserting that as a black Nova Scotian Sparks may have been biased towards the black Nova Scotian defendant. The motivation for this appeal caused substantial controversy, particularly since the allegation of bias was directed against the first black woman to be a judge in Canada, who was also at that time the only black female judge in Nova Scotia, as well as the most senior woman and only racialized minority judge in the province's family court bench. The appeal was initially successful, and Sparks's decision was overturned by the Nova Scotia Court of Appeal, but the case was taken up by the Supreme Court of Canada who in 1997 reversed the decision by the Nova Scotia Court of Appeal and restored Sparks's original decision. This appeal and the Supreme Court's rejection of it have been studied for their implications of bias in the Canadian justice system, and how they affect the reasonable apprehension of bias. The political scientist Shanti Fernando wrote that the appeal against Sparks assumed two things: first that to observe the existence of systemic racial bias in the legal system is to violate judicial impartiality, and second that judges are more sympathetic to defendants of the same ethnicity. Hutchinson and Strachan wrote that the case functions "as a springboard" for understanding the connection between a judge's interpretation and their identity in their legal decision-making. Judges have subsequently argued that the absence of similar official accusations of bias against white judges does not signify that white judges have never been biased towards white defendants, but rather demonstrates a depth of bias against non-white people in the Canadian justice system at the time.

During her career as a lawyer and as a judge, Sparks has worked on the question of ensuring equity in Canadian law. In 1993, Sparks served on the Gender Equality Task Force of the Canadian Bar Association. Sparks has also taught with the Commonwealth Judicial Education Institute, where she has conducted social context training.

Sparks was a 2015 inductee of the Bertha Wilson Honour Society, which recognises alumni of the Schulich School of Law, in honour of Bertha Wilson, the first woman on the Ontario Court of Appeal and the first female Justice of the Supreme Court of Canada. Sparks has also received the Lillian Fish Award from the National Association of the Women and the Law, as well as awards from the Elizabeth Fry Society, the Canadian Bar Association, and The Congress of Black Women.

After more than 34 years on the Bench, Sparks retired on December 31, 2021.

In 2026, she was named as an Officer of the Order of Canada. She lives in Dartmouth, Nova Scotia.
