= Nova Scotia Court of Appeal =

Highest appeal court in Canadian province

The Court of Appeal for Nova Scotia uses the Royal Arms of the King in Right of Nova Scotia to represent the King as the font of justice being administered by the court.

The Court of Appeal for Nova Scotia (Nova Scotia Court of Appeal or NSCA) is the highest appeal court in the province of Nova Scotia, Canada. There are currently 8 judicial seats including one assigned to the Chief Justice of Nova Scotia. At any given time there may be one or more additional justices who sit as supernumerary justices. The court sits in Halifax, which is the capital of Nova Scotia. Cases are heard by a panel of three judges. They publish approximately 80 cases each year.

== History ==
The Court of Appeal was established on 30 January 1993. From 1966 to 1993, appeals pursuant to Supreme Court cases were heard by the Appellate Division of the Supreme Court and, prior to 1966, by a panel of Supreme Court judges sitting en banc. The Chief Justice of the Court of Appeal is the Chief Justice of Nova Scotia. Prior to the establishment of the Court of Appeal, the Chief Justice was the Chief Justice of the Appeal Division (1966–1993) and, before 1966, of the Supreme Court.

== Jurisdiction ==
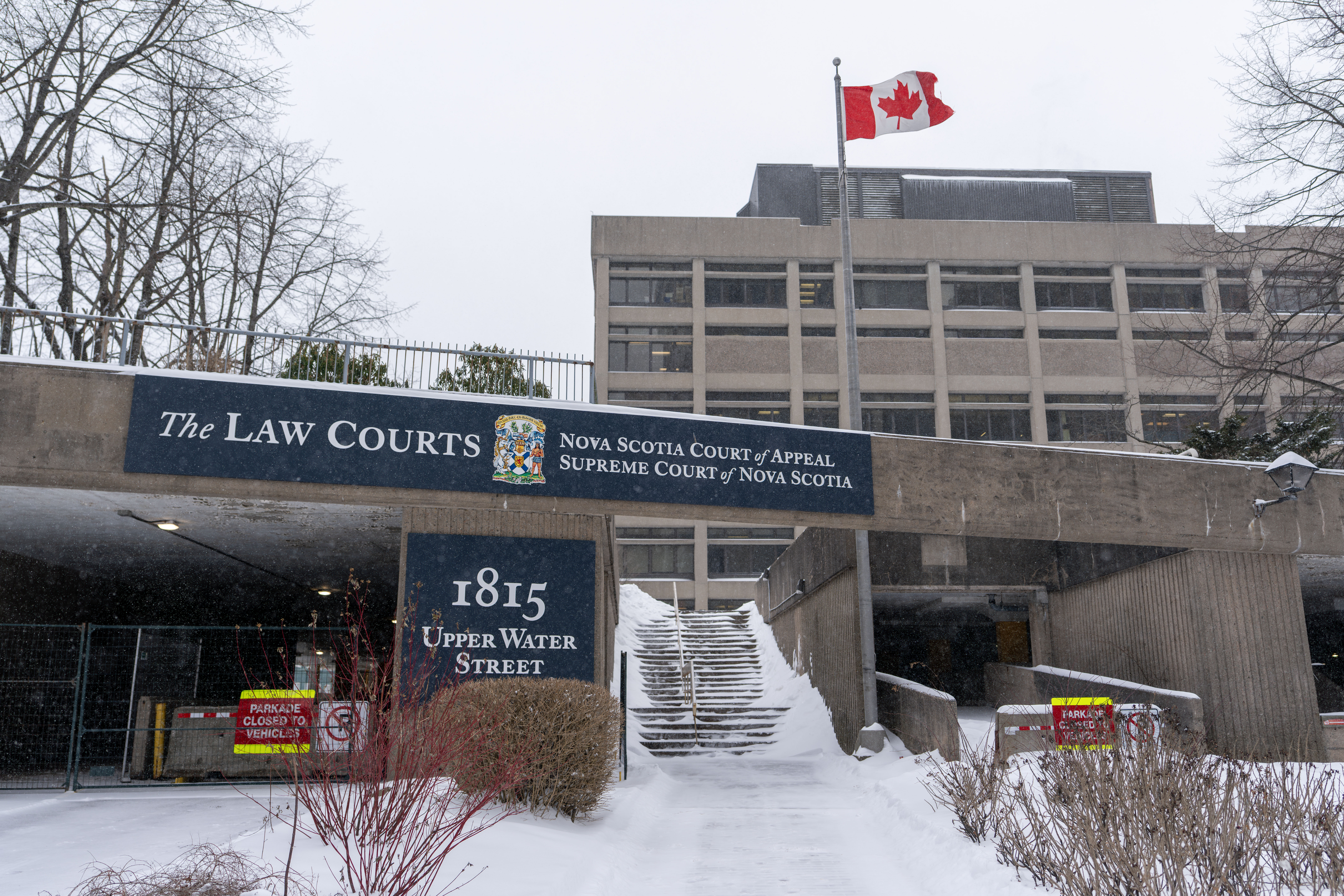
Court of Appeal building at 1815 Upper Water St, Halifax

The court derives its power from legislation of the Nova Scotia legislature, the Judicature Act. It hears appeals from the Nova Scotia Supreme Court, Provincial Court of Nova Scotia, and various tribunals.

Only the Supreme Court of Canada has jurisdiction to hear appeals from decisions of the Nova Scotia Court of Appeal; in practice this happens a few times a year.

== Judges ==
Name	Appointed	Nominated By	Prior Position(s)
Chief Justice Michael Wood	2019	J. Trudeau	Supreme Court (2011 to 2019); Burchells LLP
Justice Cindy A. Bourgeois	2014	Harper	Supreme Court (2009 to 2014) Hicks, LeMoyne LLP (1992 to 2009)
Justice Peter M.S. Bryson	2010	Harper	Supreme Court (2009 to 2010); McInnes Cooper (1982 to 2009)
Justice Anne Derrick	2017	J. Trudeau	Provincial Court (2007 to 2017); Beaton Derrick (1984 to 2007)
Justice Robin Gogan	2024	J. Trudeau	Supreme Court (2013 to 2024)
Justice David P.S. Farrar	2010	Harper	Supreme Court (2009 to 2010); Stewart McKelvey Sterling Scales LLP (1985 to 2009); Mockler Allen Dixon
Justice Elizabeth Van den Eynden	2015	Harper	Supreme Court (2013 to 2015); MacIntosh, MacDonnell & MacDonald (1988 to 2013)
Justice Carole Beaton	2019	J. Trudeau	Supreme Court (2011 to 2019)

Supernumerary

Name	Appointed	Nominated By	Prior Position(s)
Justice Joel E. Fichaud	September 26, 2003	Chretien	Patterson Palmer
Justice J. Edward Scanlan	October 2, 2013	Harper	

=== Past judges ===
Name	Duration	Nominated By	Prior Position(s)
Chief Justice Constance Glube	(1998–2005)		
Justice Gerald Freeman	(1998–2006)		
Justice Jamie W. S. Saunders	(2000–2020)	Chretien	Supreme Court (1990 to 2000)
Justice Linda L. Oland	(2000–2020)	Chretien	McInnes Cooper; Supreme Court (1998 to 2000)
Justice Thomas Cromwell	(1997–2008)		
Justice Nancy J. Bateman	(1995–2010)		
Justice Edward John Flinn	(1995–2002)		
Justice Ronald Newton Pugsley	(1993–2000)		
Justice Elizabeth Ann Roscoe	(1992–2010)		
Justice J. Doane Hallett	(1990–1997)		
Justice David Ritchie Chipman	(1987–2000)		
Justice Kenneth McNeill Matthews	(1985–1997)		
Justice Lorne Otis Clarke	(1985–1997)		
Justice Vincent A.J. Morrison	(1982–1987)		
Justice Leonard Lawson Pace	(1978–1990)		

== Chief Justice of Nova Scotia ==
The Chief Justice of Nova Scotia is the highest position in the Nova Scotia judiciary. Since the creation of the Court of Appeal, this title is held by the Chief Justice of the Court of Appeal. Prior to that the title was held by the Chief Justice of the Nova Scotia Supreme Court Appeal Division (1966–1993) or the Supreme Court (before 1966). For completeness the list includes Chief Justices of Cape Breton Island, which merged with Nova Scotia in 1820.

Chief Justices of Cape Breton Island

- William Smith (1798 -)
- William Woodfall (1803 -)
- Archibald Charles Dodd (1806–1820)

Chief Justices of Nova Scotia

- Jonathan Belcher (1754–1776)
- Charles Morris (1776–1778)
- Bryan Finucane (1778–1785)
- Isaac Deschamps (1785–1788)
- Jeremy Pemberton (1788–1789)
- Sir Thomas Andrew Lumisden Strange (1789–1797)
- Sampson Salter Blowers (1797–1833)
- Sir Brenton Halliburton (1833–1860)
- Sir William Young (1860–1881)
- James McDonald (1881–1905)
- Sir Robert Linton Weatherbe (1905–1907)
- Sir Charles James Townshend (1907–1915)
- Sir Wallace Nesbit Graham (1915–1917)
- Robert Edward Harris (1918–1931)
- Sir Joseph Andrew Chisholm (1931–1950)
- James Lorimer Ilsley (1950–1967)
- Lauchlin Daniel Currie (1967–1968)
- Alexander H. McKinnon (1968–1973)
- Ian Malcolm MacKeigan (1973–1985)
- Lorne Clarke (1985–1998)

Chief Justices of the Court of Appeal

- Constance Glube (1998–2004)
- J. Michael MacDonald (2005–2019)
- Michael Wood (2019–present)
