= National colours of Canada =

Red
#ff0000

White
#FFFFFF

The national colours of Canada (French: Couleurs nationales du Canada) are red and white, the former being symbolic of England and the latter of France, the colours having been used representatively by those countries in the past. The maple is one of the national symbols and red is both the first leaf colour after spring budding and the autumn colour of maple leaves. The colours are most prominently evident on the national flag of Canada and it has been said they were declared the country's official colours when King George V proclaimed his Canadian coat of arms in 1921. However, there is no mention of national colours in the proclamation. Similarly, the creation of Queen Elizabeth II's royal standard in 1962 is also considered to be when red and white were unofficially set as the national colours.

== History ==
Canada's national colours can trace their history to the First Crusade of the 11th century, during which Norman nobleman Bohemond I of Antioch distributed red crosses to the crusaders he led, so that they could affix them to their clothing "as a distinguishing mark". Thereafter, nations were identified by the colour of their cross and, in particular, England used a white cross on a red background and France a red cross on white. Eventually, France and England agreed to exchange their colours, and St George's Cross was adopted as an emblem of England. This was the flag used by John Cabot when he landed on the island of Newfoundland on his second voyage in 1497, under the commission of Henry VII of England. The two nations eventually explored North America, where each claimed territory.

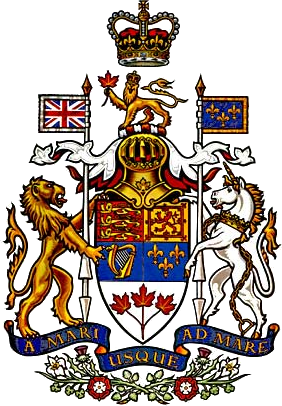
The arms of Canada. On the left is the version from 1921, with green maple leaves on a grey background in the shield. On the right, a modified version from 1957 with red maple leaves on a white background in the shield.

The proclamation of the royal coat of arms of Canada by King George V on 21 November 1921 has been considered the moment when red and white became Canada's official colours. The idea of the coat of arms determining the country's official colours was expressed as far back as 1918, when Eugène Fiset argued "red suggested Britishness, military sacrifice, and autumn splendour. White evoked Canadian winters." An unnamed member of the committee designing the coat of arms in 1920 stated, "the colours of the shield will become the national colours of the Dominion [...] the red maple leaf has been used in service flags to denote men who have sacrificed their lives for the country [...] The case for white is that it contains an allusion to snow, which is characteristic of our climate and our landscape in certain seasons." The proclamation, however, gave a blazon of "a royal helmet mantled argent doubled gules" and "a wreath of the colours argent and gules", in which argent refers to the colour white, or silver, and gules to red; tinctures used in blazoning a coat of arms. The proclamation does not say anything specifically about national colours and accepts both green and red as colours for the maple leaves, with a blazon of "three maple leaves conjoined on one stem proper"; proper means in the natural colour of the leaves. The committee first incorporated Fiset's red maple leaves on a white background, as well as a red-and-white wreath on top of the shield. But the final decision was to make the leaves green, adhering to Joseph Pope's preference. That remained their colour until 1957, when the leaves on the shield were modified to red "in recognition of Canada's official colours".

Queen's Personal Canadian Flag, 1961–2022

Canadian historian Archer Fortescue Duguid claimed in the 1940s that the King had selected red and white because those were the colours of the wreath and mantling on the coat of arms. Forrest Pass, a curator at Library and Archives Canada, determined there is no record of either the King or the committee giving much importance to the mantling. Regardless, Duguid's claim about the King selecting the colours stuck and heavily influenced the choice of colours for the national flag in 1964.

Nathan Tidridge argued that it was the creation of the Queen's Personal Canadian Flag in 1961 that set red and white as the national colours. The banner's registration with the Canadian Heraldic Authority also does not mention either national colours or the colours red or white.

== Reproduction ==
For the Federal Identity Program operated by the Treasury Board Secretariat, official and signage colours are specified in technical specification T-145. The red colour is named FIP red and represented by the hexadecimal triplet FF0000, the 8-bit per channel RGB value (255,0,0), the CMYK colour (0,100,100,0), or the Pantone Colour Matching System colour Pantone 032. White is represented by CMYK colour white (255,255,255) and hexadecimal FFFFFF and the de facto national colour, black, is represented as CMYK colour black; six more colours are defined for use by the government.

A second red colour, known as safety red, is also specified, but, not used for official symbols; it is represented by the hexadecimal triplet E8112D, RGB value (230,15,45), CMYK colour (0,90,75,0), or Pantone colour 185.

== Uses ==
The Flag of Canada consists of elements using only the national colours.

The national flag uses the national colours. Its red-white-red pattern is derived from the flag of the Royal Military College of Canada and the Canada General Service Medal of 1899.

The national colours are used in federal government branding as part of the Federal Identity Program. This includes the use of the Canadian flag in the Canada wordmark, the "global identifier of the Government of Canada" specified in technical specification T-130.

The Canadian Forces' Decoration ribbon consists of four red bars separated by equally spaced thin white lines. The Canada Medal instituted on 14 October 1943 was specified to have a ribbon in the national colours, which was the same ribbon used for the Canada General Service Medal. The ill-fated medal was never awarded, and was abolished in 1966 with the introduction of the Order of Canada, which also has a red and white ribbon.

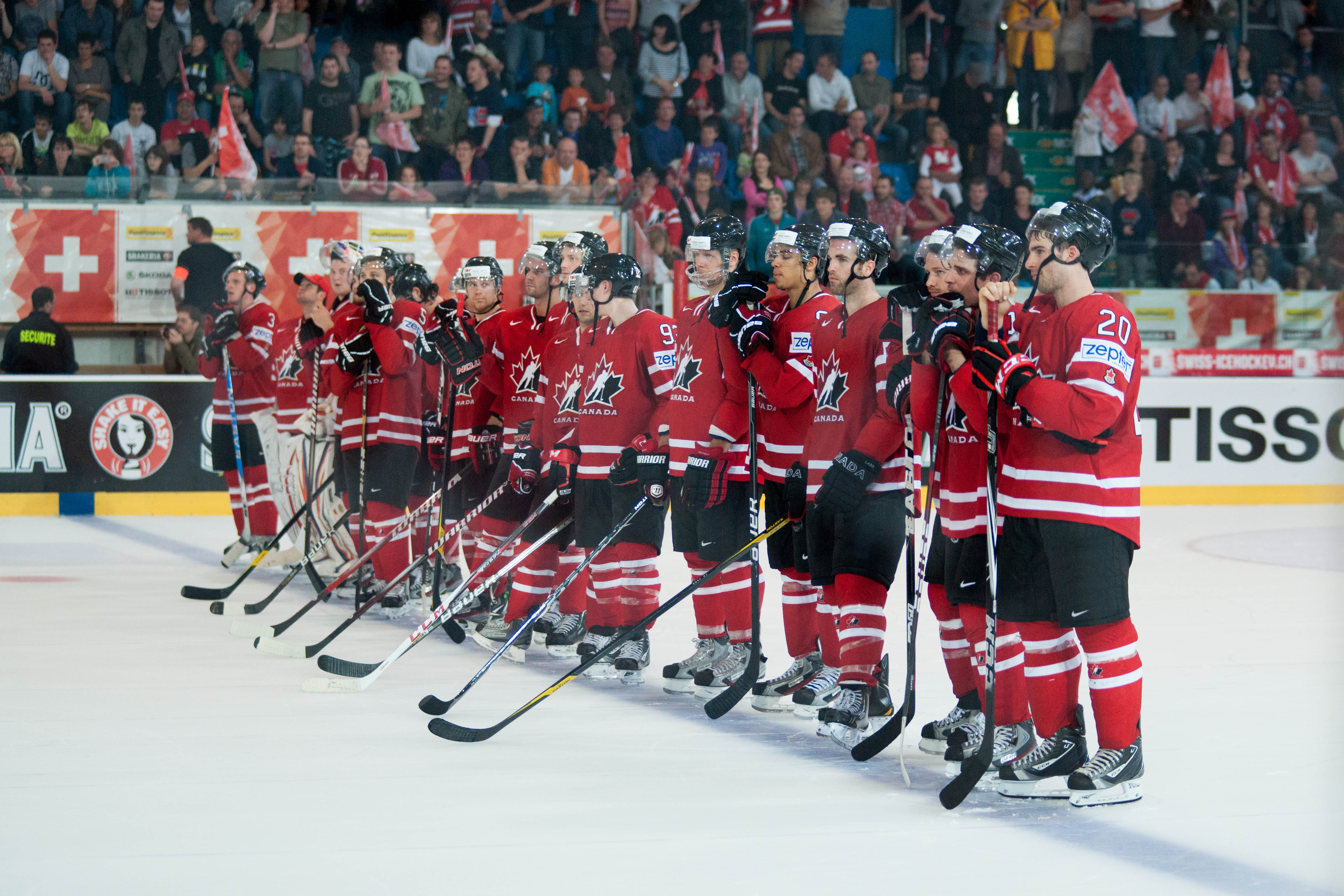
The Canadian men's national ice hockey team wearing jerseys that feature the national colours of Canada

The Toronto Blue Jays, a franchise in Major League Baseball, honour Canada Day by wearing an alternate jersey instead of the team's usual uniform. In the 1990s, the team would wear red baseball caps, or a red uniform. In 2012, the team wore a red uniform with white lettering.

The Canadian national colours and the de facto third colour, black, are used prominently by ice hockey teams representing the nation, including the men's ice hockey team, men's junior ice hockey team, men's under-18 ice hockey team, men's ice sledge hockey team, men's inline hockey team, women's ice hockey team, and women's under-18 ice hockey team. The logo of Hockey Canada, the national governing body for ice hockey in Canada, is red, white, and black; though, their specifications are different from those of the national colours.

== See also ==
- Canadian royal symbols
