= Jeremy Pemberton =

Jeremy Pemberton may refer to:

- Jeremy Pemberton (priest), the first male Anglican priest to marry another man
- Jeremy Pemberton (judge), former Chief Justice of Nova Scotia
