= Joseph Phillip Kennedy =

Canadian judge

Chief Justice of Nova Scotia Supreme Court
- In office 1998–2019

Personal details
- Born: 1945 Enfield, Nova Scotia

Joseph Phillip Kennedy is a former Chief Justice of the Nova Scotia Supreme Court.

== Education ==
Joseph Kennedy graduated with a Bachelor of Arts from St. Mary's University in 1965. He graduated from the Dalhousie Law School in 1968 and was called to the bar on January 3, 1969.

== Career ==
He practiced privately from 1969 to 1978 in the Bridgewater firm of Kenney, Theakson, Kennedy & Allen.

He was appointed on the recommendation of a recruitment committee, which considered applications from current Provincial Court judges. The committee consists of the Chief Justice of Nova Scotia (who chairs the committee), the Chief Judge of the Family Court, the outgoing Chief Judge of the Provincial Court, the president of the Provincial Judges' Association, and a lay person (without a law degree) designated by the Canadian Minister of Justice.

He was previously a judge of the Provincial Court from 1978 to 1993, at which point he was appointed Chief Judge of the Provincial Court of Nova Scotia. He served as the Associate Chief Justice of the Supreme Court from 1996 to 1998, and finally was elevated to Chief Justice in 1998.

Justice Kennedy announced his retirement on November 1, 2018 and retired on April 30, 2019.
