= Elizabeth Cromwell (disambiguation) =

Elizabeth Cromwell may refer to:

Close relations of Oliver Cromwell

- Elizabeth Cromwell [''née Stewart] (–1654), mother of Oliver Cromwell
- Elizabeth Cromwell [née Bourchier] (1598–1665), Lady Protectress, wife of Oliver Cromwell
- Elizabeth Claypole (1629–1658), second and favourite daughter of Oliver Cromwell
- Elizabeth Cromwell, (née Russell) (–1687) wife of Henry Cromwell
- Elizabeth Cromwell, (1650–) daughter of Richard Cromwell
- Elizabeth Wyckes (d. 1529), wife of Thomas Cromwell, 1st Earl of Essex

See also

- Elizabeth Cromwell (activist) (1944–2019), African Nova Scotian and Black Loyalist
- Elizabeth Seymour, Lady Cromwell (c. 1518–1568), married Gregory Cromwell, son of Thomas Cromwell, 1st Earl of Essex and was the sister of Jane Seymour, third wife of Henry VIII.
