= R v S (RD) =

- Supreme Court of Canada

Hearing: March 10, 1997 Judgment: September 26, 1997
- Full case name: RDS v Her Majesty The Queen
- Citations: [1997] 3 SCR 484; 161 NSR (2d) 241
- Docket No.: 25063
- Prior history: Judgment for the Crown in the Court of Appeal for Nova Scotia.
- Ruling: The appeal should be allowed.

Court membership
- Chief Justice: Antonio Lamer; Puisne Justices: Gérard La Forest, Claire L'Heureux-Dubé, John Sopinka, Charles Gonthier, Peter Cory, Beverley McLachlin, Frank Iacobucci, John C. Major

Reasons given
- Majority: Cory J, joined by Iacobucci J
- Concurrence: Gonthier J, joined by La Forest J
- Concurrence: L'Heureux-Dubé and McLachlin JJ
- Dissent: Major J, joined by Lamer CJ and Sopinka J

R v. S (RD), [1997] 3 SCR 484, is a leading Supreme Court of Canada decision which established rules governing reasonable apprehension of judicial bias in the court system and the consideration of social context, such as systemic racism, when rendering judgement. The accused was defended by Burnley "Rocky" Jones of Halifax, Nova Scotia.

== Facts ==
On October 17, 1993, in the city of Halifax, Nova Scotia, a black youth was arrested—referred to in the case under the pseudonym "S" or "RDS"—for allegedly assaulting the police officer Stienburg while he was attempting to arrest another individual. The police officer claimed that the youth ran into him with his bike attempting to free the individual the police officer already had handcuffed. The youth, on the other hand, alleged that he stopped his bike to see what the police officer was doing, as a crowd had amassed at the scene. The youth recognised the individual being arrested and asked him repeatedly if he should call his mother, not once addressing the officer. Hearing the youth, the officer threatened to arrest him. When the youth continued to talk the police officer arrested him.

== Ruling ==
At the trial level, Judge Corrine Sparks acquitted the youth, for the reason that the only evidence was the testimony of the officer and the youth, and both had reasonable credibility. In the end of her judgement, she added,

I’m not saying that the Constable has misled the court, although police officers have been known to do that in the past. I am not saying that the officer overreacted, but certainly police officers do overreact, particularly when they are dealing with non-white groups. That to me, indicates a state of mind right there that is questionable. I believe that probably the situation in this particular case is the case of a young police officer who overreacted. I do accept the evidence of R.D.S. that he was told to shut up or he would be under arrest. That seems to be in keeping with the prevalent attitude of the day"

The last phrase became the focus of all the appeals to follow. Judgements needs to be based solely on the evidence while the phrase suggests some preconceived notions.

It was determined at the trial and appeal level that there was an "apprehension of bias" on the part of Sparks.

However, the Supreme Court of Canada allowed the appeal and restored Sparks' acquittal of RDS. The Court noted that

A judge who happens to be black is no more likely to be biased in dealing with black litigants, than a white judge is likely to be biased in favour of white litigants. All judges of every race, colour, religion, or national background are entitled to the same presumption of judicial integrity and the same high threshold for a finding of bias. (para. 115)

A high standard must be met before a finding of reasonable apprehension of bias can be made. Troubling as Judge Sparks’ remarks may be, the Crown has not satisfied its onus to provide the cogent evidence needed to impugn the impartiality of Judge Sparks. Although her comments, viewed in isolation, were unfortunate and unnecessary, a reasonable, informed person, aware of all the circumstances, would not conclude that they gave rise to a reasonable apprehension of bias. (para. 158)
