= Lorne Clarke =

Lorne Clarke may refer to:

- Lorne Clarke (judge)

== See also ==
- Lorna Clarke, Australian politician
