= John Poad Drake =

John Poad Drake (1794–1883) was an inventor and artist from Stoke Damerel, in present-day Devon. He worked at the Plymouth Dockyard. He later painted in Halifax, Nova Scotia (1815), Montreal and New York. He later returned to England and patented a new system for drilling screws at the shipyard. He is a descendant of Sir Francis Drake. Drake was a student of the Royal Academy in London. Drake's painting of the Last Supper hangs in the new Christ Church Cathedral, on St. Catherine Street, Montreal (1825).

== Gallery ==
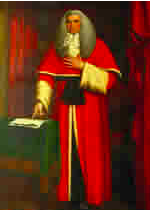
Sampson Salter Blowers, Nova Scotia Supreme Court, Halifax, Nova Scotia

== Links ==
- Shippling at Low Tide, Halifax, Art Gallery of Nova Scotia
- Montreal from St. Helen's Island, Royal Ontario Museum
- Montreal
- Quebec
