= NSLR =

NSLR may refer to:

- National Security Law Report, periodical of the American Bar Association's Standing Committee on Law and National Security
- Nova Scotia Reports, decisions of the Nova Scotia Court of Appeal
