= Henry Bliss =

Henry Bliss may refer to:

- Henry H. Bliss (1830–1899), first person killed by an automobile in the US
- Henry E. Bliss (1870–1955), American librarian and creator of the Bliss bibliographic classification
- Henry Edward Ernest Victor Bliss (1869–1926), British traveller and philanthropist commonly known as Baron Bliss
- Henry Bliss (author) (1797–1873), Canadian author, lawyer and provincial agent for New Brunswick and Nova Scotia

== See also ==
- Harry Bliss (born 1964), American cartoonist and illustrator
- William Henry Bliss (1835–1911), English scholar
