= Jamie W. S. Saunders =

Jamie William Sutherland Saunders is a former Justice of the Nova Scotia Court of Appeal.

== Early life and education ==
Justice Saunders was born in Yorkton, Saskatchewan, Canada. He graduated from Bishop's University in 1970, having studied in Political Science. He then obtained his law degree at Dalhousie Law School, graduating in 1973.

== Legal career ==
Called to the bar in 1974, he practiced law in Halifax as both a civil and criminal litigator. His experience included working as counsel for the Nova Scotia government on the Donald Marshall, Jr. Inquiry.

In 1990, he was appointed to the Nova Scotia Supreme Court. In 2000, he was appointed to the Nova Scotia Court of Appeal.

In June 2020, the Nova Scotia Courts announced on Twitter that Saunders would retire from the Court of Appeal in September 2020.
