= Elizabeth Cromwell (activist) =

African Nova Scotian and black loyalist

Elizabeth Cromwell ONS CM MC
- Born: Elizabeth Ann Gallion; September 4, 1944 (age 82); Shelburne, Nova Scotia
- Died: October 2, 2019
- Education: Shelburne Regional High School; Mount Saint Vincent University; Dalhousie University
- Awards: 125th Anniversary of the Confederation of Canada Medal; Canada Medal
- Honours: Order of Nova Scotia (2019); Order of Canada

Elizabeth Ann Cromwell ONS CM MC (née Gallion; September 4, 1944 – October 2, 2019) was an African Nova Scotian and Black Loyalist. She dedicated her career to the celebration of African Nova Scotian History and recognising the experiences of the Birchtown black loyalists. She was recognised with an Order of Nova Scotia in 2019.

== Education and early career ==
Cromwell grew up in Shelburne, Nova Scotia. She was the daughter of James and Annabelle Gallion. She attended the Shelburne Regional High School and trained in social work at the Halifax Vocational School. She worked for the Children's Aid Society where she served as a case work supervisor.

== Career ==
Cromwell is best known for establishing the Shelburne County Cultural Awareness Society after a landfill was proposed in her local community. The proposed landfill would have destroyed African Nova Scotian archaeological items, and the society successfully campaigned against the landfill. The success of the campaign against the landfill resulted in the incorporation of the Black Loyalist Heritage Society. Cromwell led the Black Heritage Society until 2002, and again from 2008 to 2016. An archaeological dig near Cromwell's family home revealed over 10,000 artefacts from the late 1700s. In 1996 the Black Loyalist Heritage Society secured a national historic site and monument board in Birchtown to recognise the landing of the black loyalists in Canada in 1783. When Birchtown was founded in 1783 it was the largest settlement of free black people in North America.

The society acquired numerous properties to display their expanding collection of artefacts and information. Working with the Nova Scotia Museum Cromwell created an exhibition called Remembering Black Loyalists, Black Communities. The exhibition soon became a permanent display. It developed a heritage walking trail for visitors that encouraged visitors to explore the museum, a burial ground and an early settlement. Cromwell hired historical researchers to protect the histories of the African Nova Scotians by collecting genealogical information on the black loyalists. The operational hub for the Black Loyalist Heritage Society was a bungalow on Old Birchtown Road. The bungalow was destroyed by a mysterious fire, but the case of arson never went to trial. In the weeks following the fire there were several race-related threats against Cromwell and the society. Cromwell coordinated fundraising to rebuild the centre. In 2015 Cromwell helped to formally open the Black Loyalist Heritage Centre.

Cromwell died on October 2, 2019.

=== Awards and honours ===
She was awarded an honorary degree at Mount Saint Vincent University in 2014. In 2017 Cromwell was awarded an honorary doctorate from Dalhousie University and appointed a Member of the Order of Canada. Cromwell had previously been awarded a 125th Anniversary of the Confederation of Canada Medal and Canada Medal. She was honoured during the Birchtown African history month at the 2019 Municipal Proclamation Launch. Her efforts were celebrated with a posthumous Order of Nova Scotia in November 2019. She was the second person from Shelburne to be recognised with such an honour.

== Personal life ==
Cromwell was first married to Joseph Howard and later to Everett Sylvester Cromwell.
