= Darlene Jamieson =

Canadian judge

The Honourable Darlene Jamieson

Judge of the Supreme Court of Nova Scotia
- Incumbent
- Assumed office 2018
- Preceded by: K. Coady

Associate Chief Justice of the Supreme Court of Nova Scotia
- Incumbent
- Assumed office November 8, 2025
- Preceded by: Patrick J. Duncan

Personal details
- Citizenship: Canadian
- Education: Saint Mary's University (Halifax) in 1985, Schulich School of Law in 1988, Nova Scotia Bar 1989
- Awards: King's Counsel in 2006; Fellow of the American College of Trial Lawyers in 2018

Darlene Jamieson is a Canadian judge. She was appointed to the Supreme Court of Nova Scotia on November 30, 2018 and was appointed as Associate Chief Justice of the Supreme Court of Nova Scotia on November 8, 2025, replacing Patrick J. Duncan who become a supernumerary judge effective June 30, 2025.

Until her appointment as a judge in 2018, she was President of the Law Reform Commission of Nova Scotia. She also served on the boards of Imagine Canada, Avalon Sexual Assault Centre, and the National Association of Women and the Law.
