= William Blowers Bliss =

Canadian politician

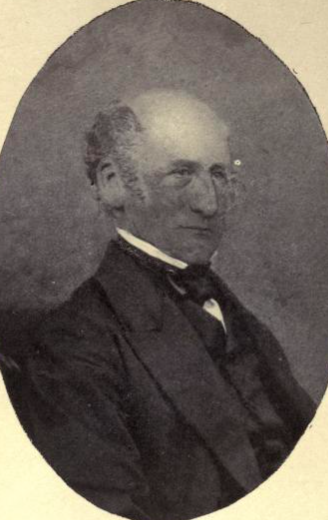
William Blowers Bliss

William Blowers Bliss (August 24, 1795 – March 16, 1874) was a lawyer, judge and political figure in Nova Scotia. He represented Hants County in the Nova Scotia House of Assembly from 1830 to 1834.

He was born in Saint John, New Brunswick, the son of Jonathan Bliss and Mary Worthington, Massachusetts loyalists, and he was educated at King's Collegiate School and King's College. Bliss was called to the Nova Scotia bar in 1818. He continued his law education at Westminster Hall and at the Inner Temple with Sir William Wightman. In 1823, he married Sarah Ann Anderson, the adopted daughter of Sampson Salter Blowers. Bliss supported a group of Halifax businessman by advocating a charter for the Bank of Nova Scotia in 1832 and he later served as a director for the bank. In 1834, he was named a puisne judge for the Supreme Court of Nova Scotia. Bliss resigned from the bench in January 1869. He served on the board of governors for King's College from 1848 to 1853. Bliss died in Halifax at the age of 78. His portrait hangs in the Halifax County Court House.

His daughter Elizabeth Ann married William Hunter Odell, his daughter Mary married Bishop Hibbert Binney and his daughter Louisa married Bishop James B. Kelly. His brother Henry was a lawyer and author who served as provincial agent in London for Nova Scotia and New Brunswick.

Sir Charles James Townshend published an article Memoir of the life of the Honorable William Blowers Bliss in the Collections of the Nova Scotia Historical Society in 1913.

== Legacy ==
- Namesake of Bliss Street, Halifax, Nova Scotia.
