= Timothy Gabriel =

Canadian judge

D. Timothy Gabriel is a judge on the Supreme Court of Nova Scotia. In September 2010, he became the first judge appointed in Canada from the Mi'kmaq indigenous First Nations tribe. He is a member of the Qalipu First Nation.
