= Richard Westmacott (the younger) =

English sculptor (1799-1872)

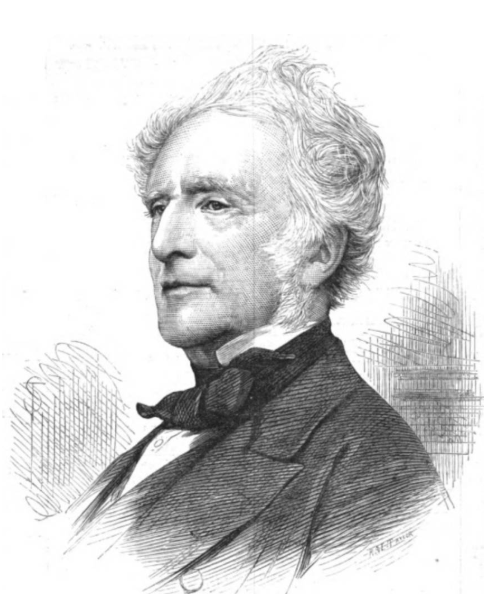
Richard Westmacott Jr. (1799-1872)

Richard Westmacott (the younger) FRS RA (14 April 1799 – 19 April 1872) was a prominent English sculptor of the early and mid-19th century. He was also sometimes referred to as Richard Westmacott III to distinguish him from his father and grandfather – both sculptors bearing the same name.

== Life ==
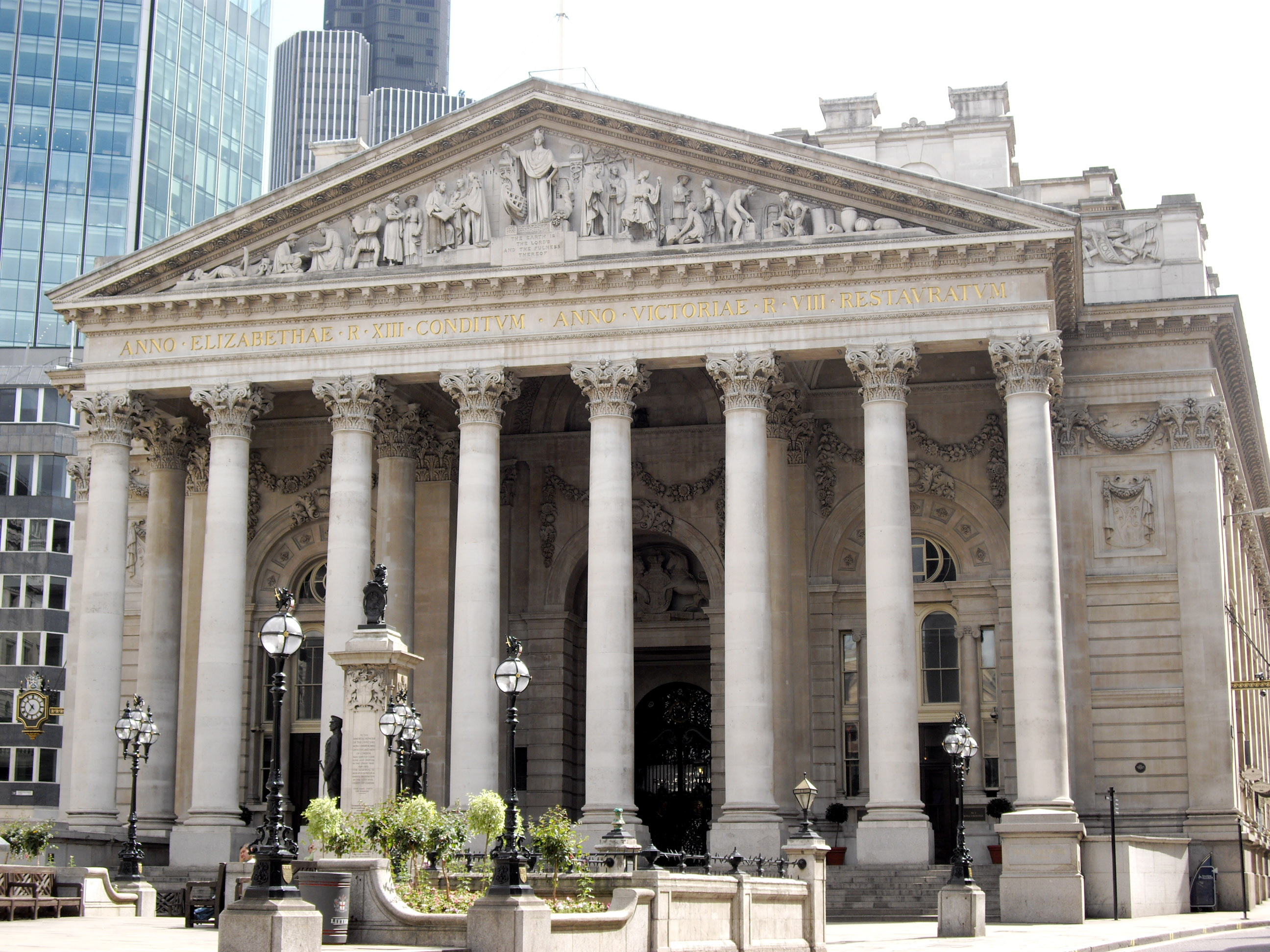
Royal Exchange, pediment by Richard Westmacott

Born in London, he was the son of Sir Richard Westmacott (1775–1856), and followed closely in his father's footsteps: studying at the Royal Academy (from 1818), being elected as an Associate of the Royal Academy (in 1838) and a full Academician (in 1849), and then succeeding his father to serve as the RA's professor of sculpture (1857–68) – the only time an RA professorship passed from father to son.

Among his most notable works is the pediment of the Royal Exchange in the City of London. Other works include:

- the tomb of Philip Yorke, 3rd Earl of Hardwicke at St Andrew's Church in Wimpole, Cambridgeshire
- monument commemorating Sir John Franklin's lost Arctic expedition of 1845, now in the Chapel sacristy at Greenwich Hospital, south-east London.
- monument for Chief Justice Sampson Salter Blowers at St. Paul's Church, Halifax, Nova Scotia

Westmacott was elected a Fellow of the Royal Society in May 1837, his candidacy citation saying that he was "Richard Westmacott Junr Esqr of 21 Wilton Place Belgrave Square, Sculptor, Author of the Article "Sculpture" in the Encyclopædia Metropolitana, and of various Essays and Articles on Art, and Antiquity, a gentleman devoted to Science in general, and the fine Arts in particular"

He is commemorated by a memorial in St Mary Abbots church in Kensington, west London.

== Works ==
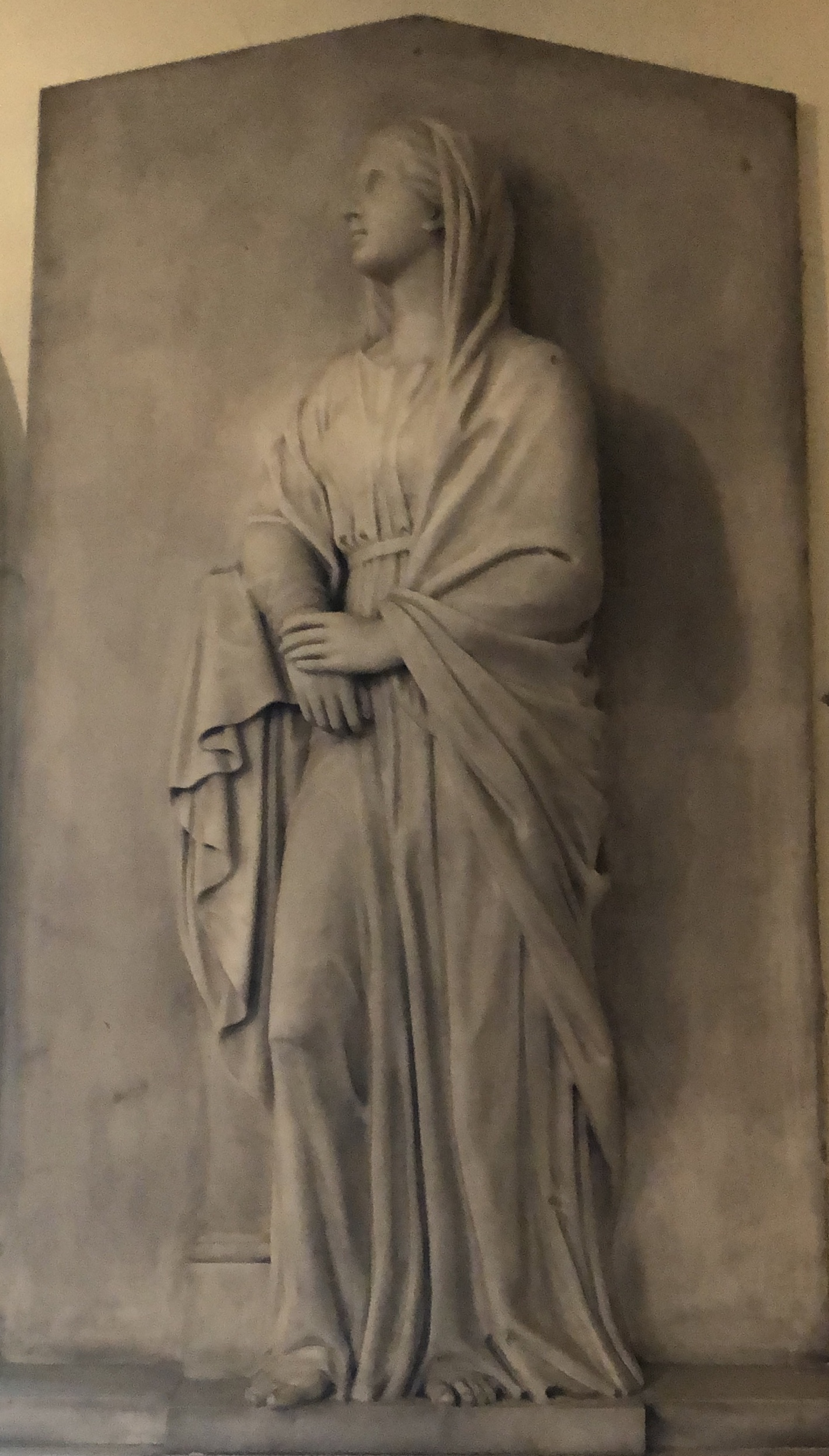
Monument by Richard Westmacott III for Sampson Salter Blowers, St. Paul's Church, Halifax, Nova Scotia

public works by Westmacott include

- Monument to William Burslem, 1820, Worcester Cathedral
- Monument to Sacharissa Hibbert, 1828, Exeter Cathedral
- Monument to Rev William Pemberton, 1828, Newton, Cambridgeshire
- Bust of Sir William Sidney Smith, 1829
- Monument to George Pretyman Tomline, Bishop of Winchester, 1830, Winchester Cathedral
- Bust of George Tierney, 1830, Westminster Abbey
- Monument to Sir Manasseh Masseh Lopes, 1831, Buckleigh Church, Devon
- Bust of Davies Gilbert, 1833, Pembroke College, Oxford
- Bust of Lord King, 1833, Ockham Church, Surrey
- Bust of Rev Sydney Smith, 1835
- Bust, in Carrara marble, of Friedrich August Rosen, 1838, British Museum
- Bust of Archdeacon Berners, 1839, Wolverstone Church, Suffolk
- Bust of Mrs Henry Milman, 1839
- Bust of Viscount Fordwich, 1840
- Bust of Cardinal Newman, 1841
- Busts of Wibraham Egerton and his daughter, 1842, Tatton Park, Cheshire
- Bust of Lord John Russell, 1843, Woburn Abbey
- Bust of Lord Wriothesley Russell, 1844, Woburn Abbey
- Monument to Sir Henry Holland, 1st Baronet, 1844, Wistow, Leicestershire
- Bust of Marianne Packe, 1844, Prestwold Church, Leicestershire
- Bust of the Marquess of Tavistock, 1844, Woburn Abbey
- Bust of Sir Francis Burdett, 1845, collection of Rupert Gunnis
- Bust, in Carrara marble, of John Edward Gray, 1845, British Museum
- Bust of Sir Roderick Murchison, 1847, Scottish National Portrait Gallery
- Bust of the Francis Russell, 7th Duke of Bedford, 1847, Woburn Abbey
- Bust of Earl Talbot, 1847
- Monument to Archbishop Howley (recumbent figure), 1848, Canterbury Cathedral
- Bust of Lord Wharncliffe, 1849
- Tomb of Bishop Kaye (recumbent figure), 1857, Lincoln Cathedral
