= Lorne Clarke (judge) =

Chief Justice of Nova Scotia (1928–2016)

20th Chief Justice of Nova Scotia
- In office August 22, 1985 – 1998
- Preceded by: Ian Malcolm MacKeigan
- Succeeded by: Constance Glube

Personal details
- Born: November 22, 1928 Malagash, Nova Scotia
- Died: May 21, 2016 (aged 87) Halifax, Nova Scotia

Lorne Otis Clarke OC ONS (November 22, 1928 – May 21, 2016) was a Canadian lawyer and Chief Justice of the Nova Scotia Supreme Court.

== Early life and education ==
Born in Malagash, Nova Scotia, in 1928, he graduated from Dalhousie University with a B.A. in 1949 and an LL.B. in 1951. In 1955, he received an LL.M. from Harvard University. He was admitted to the bar in 1953.

== Career ==
He was a member of the Faculty of Law of Dalhousie University from 1952 to 1959. From 1959 to 1981, he practised law in Truro, Nova Scotia. He was appointed Queen's Counsel in 1969.

In 1981, he was made a Judge of the Supreme Court of Nova Scotia, Trial Division. On August 22, 1985, he became the twentieth Chief Justice since the founding of the Nova Scotia Supreme Court in 1754. He retired in 1998. From 1998 to 1999, he was the Chair of the Memorial Advisory Committee of Swissair Flight 111.

In 1999, he was made an Officer of the Order of Canada. In 2002, he was awarded the Order of Nova Scotia.

He died on May 21, 2016, in Halifax.

== Personal life ==
He married Mary Louise MacLeod on August 22, 1959, at St.Andrews Presbyterian Church in Pictou, NS. They had three children: Nora, George and Colin.
