= Canada General Service Medal =

Canadian campaign medal

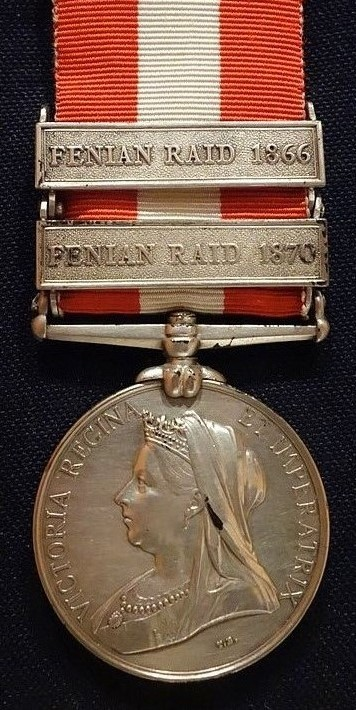
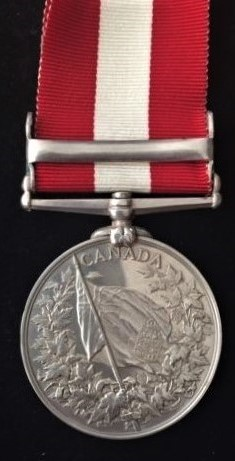
- Obverse and reverse of medal
- Type: Campaign medal
- Awarded for: Campaign service.
- Description: Silver disk 36 mm wide
- Presented by: Canada; United Kingdom of Great Britain and Ireland
- Eligibility: Imperial and Canadian Forces
- Clasps: Fenian Raid 1866; Fenian Raid 1870; Red River 1870
- Established: 1 January 1899
- Total: 17,623
- Ribbon: 32mm: Three equal stripes of red-white-red

The Canada General Service Medal is a campaign medal that was awarded by the Canadian Government to both Imperial and Canadian forces for duties related to the Fenian raids between 1866 and 1871. The medal was initially issued in 1899 and had to be applied for. The application period was later extended to 1907, then to 1928.

With late applications, 17,623 medals were awarded, including 15,300 to members of Canadian units.

The medal, 1.4 inches (36 mm) in diameter, is silver and has a plain straight swivel suspender. The obverse bears the head of Queen Victoria with the legend "Victoria Regina et Imperatrix" (Latin for 'Victoria Queen and Empress'), while the reverse depicts the ensign of Canada surrounded by a wreath of maple leaves with the word "Canada" above. The recipient's name, rank and unit appear on the rim of the medal. A number of different impressed and engraved styles were used, reflecting that the medal was awarded over a long period of time. The 1 1/4-inch-wide (32 mm) ribbon consists of three equal stripes of red, white and red. In 1943 the same ribbon was adopted for the Canada Medal.

== Clasps ==
The medal was always awarded with a clasp, with 12 medals awarded with all three clasps. The number of clasps indicated below includes those that appear on multi-clasp medals.

Fenian Raid 1866
For services related to the Fenian raids of 1866. 13,000 clasps were awarded.
Fenian Raid 1870
For services related to the Fenian raids of 1870. 5,925 clasps were awarded.
Red River 1870
For services related to the suppression of the Red River Rebellion. 502 clasps were awarded.
