= Ann MacLean =

Canadian politician, mental health therapist

Ann MacLean ONS
- Born: New Glasgow, Nova Scotia, Canada
- Education: B.A., M.A., social work, Dalhousie University
- Years active: 1991–2008 (mayor); 2004-2005 (president of the national Board of the Federation of Canadian Municipalities)
- Spouse: Russell MacLellan

Ann MacLean ONS is a Canadian politician, mental health therapist, and social worker. She was elected to Councillor of New Glasgow, Nova Scotia in 1985 and mayor in 1991. She was the first female Mayor in New Glasgow's history.

== Early life and education ==
MacLean earned her Bachelor of Arts and master's degree in Social Work from Dalhousie University.

== Career ==
In 1976, MacLean founded the Metropolitan Mental Health Group Homes Association and later the Tearmann Society for Abused Women in 1984. The following year, MacLean was elected to New Glasgow, Nova Scotia's Town Council, before running for mayor. In 1991, she became the first female in New Glasgow, Nova Scotia's history to be elected mayor.

From 2004 until 2005, while serving as mayor, MacLean was appointed president of the national Board of the Federation of Canadian Municipalities. During her term as president, she worked with mayor Anna Allen to encourage more woman to join political offices. She also began to develop women's shelters, which was a taboo topic at the time. After being re-elected mayor in 2004, MacLean decided to leave politics in 2008. Upon her retirement, she became the longest-serving mayor in New Glasgow's history of New Glasgow. The next year, the Federation of Canadian of Municipalities created The Ann MacLean Award for Outstanding Service by a Woman in Municipal Politics to honour her achievements.

In 2013, MacLean chaired the Pictou County United Way's Leaders of the Way Campaign and was later named to the Halifax International Airport Authority board of directors. In 2019, MacLean was the recipient of the Order of Nova Scotia.
