= Shelburne Regional High School =

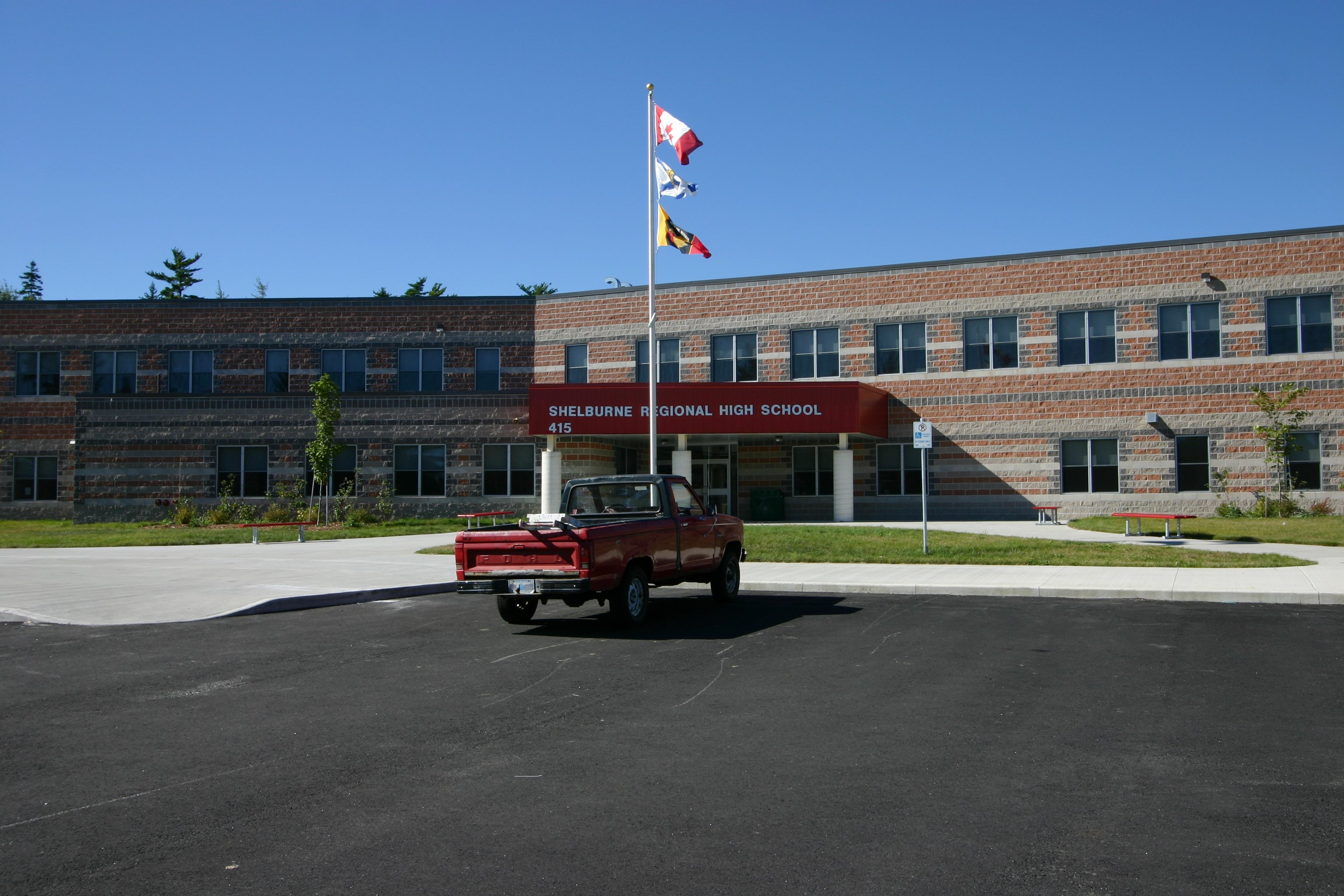

Location
- 415 Woodlawn Drive; Shelburne, Nova Scotia; Canada; 43.77145°N 65.30185°W

Information
- Type: High School
- Motto: Veritas Prevalet (Truth Prevails)
- Established: 1947
- Principal: Jeff Rankin
- Grades: 7-12
- Colors: Blue and Gold
- Website: https://sites.google.com/site/shelburneregional/

Shelburne Regional High School (SRHS) is a secondary school located in Shelburne, Nova Scotia. SRHS is part of the Tri-County Regional Centre for Education and is the only high school in the town of Shelburne. The original high school, located on King Street, was home to students for 53 years until a new high school was built in 2004.

== Administration ==
- Jeff Rankin - Principal
