= Wallace Graham (judge) =

Canadian judge

Sir Wallace Nesbit Graham (15 January 1848 – 12 October 1917) was a Canadian judge. He was Chief Justice of Nova Scotia from 1915 to 1917.

== Biography ==
The son of David Graham and Mary Elizabeth Bigelow, Graham was educated at Acadia College (BA 1867). He was called to the Bar in 1871, was appointed a Queen's Counsel in 1881. He was standing counsel in Nova Scotia for the Government of Canada 8 years. He was appointed on the commission to revise the Statutes of Canada in 1883; and to revise the Statutes of Nova Scotia in 1898.

In 1889, he became a Judge in Equity of Supreme Court and of Court for Divorce in Nova Scotia.
