= Provincial Court of Nova Scotia =

Court of criminal jurisdiction in Canadian province

The Provincial Court of Nova Scotia is the court of criminal jurisdiction for the Canadian province of Nova Scotia. There are twenty-three Justices and one Chief Justice on the bench, who sit in one of 33 locations over the province.

The Justices are appointed by the province.

== Judges ==
=== Current judges ===
Name	Location	Date appointed	Appointed by	Prior position(s)
Chief Judge Pamela S. Williams	HRM	September 19, 2003; February 27, 2013 (Chief)	PC (2003); NDP (2013)	NS Legal Aid, Youth
Associate Chief Judge S. Raymond Morse	Truro	April 12, 2011	NDP	Private practice
Judge Corrine Sparks	Dartmouth	March 30, 1987	PC	Private practice
Judge A. Peter Ross	Sydney	1990	PC	NS Public Prosecution Service
Judge Michael B. Sherar	Halifax	1990	PC	Private practice
Judge Brian D. Williston	Sydney	1995	Liberal	NS Public Prosecution Service
Judge Alanna Murphy	Dartmouth	November 13, 2002	PC	NS Public Prosecution Service (1987 to 2002), Chief Crown (2000 to 2002)
Judge James H. Burrill	Yarmouth	September 19, 2003	PC	NS Public Prosecution Service (1987 to 2003)
Judge Laurel J. Halfpenny-MacQuarrie	Port Hawkesbury	September 19, 2003	PC	NS Public Prosecution Service; Private practice
Judge Frank P. Hoskins	Dartmouth	September 5, 2008	PC	NS Public Prosecution Service (1991 to 1995, 1996 to 2008); Private practice (1995 to 1996)
Judge Theodore K. Tax	Dartmouth	October 1, 2008	PC	Department of Justice Canada
Judge Marci Lin Melvin	Kentville	November 12, 2008	PC	NS Legal Aid
Judge Jean M. Whalen	Dartmouth	January 16, 2009	PC	NS Public Prosecution Service
Judge Del W. Atwood	Pictou	November 10, 2009	NDP	NS Public Prosecution Service
Judge Jean M. Dewolfe	Kentville	November 10, 2009	NDP	Private practice
Judge Richard J. MacKinnon	Antigonish	November 10, 2009	NDP	NS Public Prosecution Service
Judge Gregory E. Lenehan	Halifax	October 19, 2010	NDP	NS Public Prosecution Service (1989 to 2010)
Judge Paul V. Scovil	Bridgewater	August 2, 2011	NDP	NS Public Prosecution Service (1998 to 2011)
Judge Timothy D. Landry	Digby/Yarmouth	September 19, 2012	NDP	NS Legal Aid
Judge Michelle Christenson	Yarmouth	December 11, 2013	NDP	NS Public Prosecution Service
Judge Daniel A. MacRury	Dartmouth	July 30, 2014	Liberal	NS Public Prosecution Service
Judge Timothy Daley	Pictou	March 17, 2015	Liberal	Private practice
Judge Elizabeth Buckle	Amherst	March 31, 2015	Liberal	Private practice
Judge E. Ann Marie MacInnes	Sydney	November 10, 2015	Liberal	NS Legal Aid
Judge Alain Bégin	Truro	September 1, 2016	Liberal	Private practice
Judge Ronda van der Hoek	Kentville/Windsor	January 23, 2017	Liberal	Public Prosecution Service of Canada
Judge Cathy Benton	Bridgewater/Shubenacadie	January 23, 2017	Liberal	NS Legal Aid
Judge Rickcola Brinton	Halifax	March 31, 2017	Liberal	NS Legal Aid, Youth (2001 to 2017)
Judge Samuel Moreau	Amherst	March 31, 2017	Liberal	NS Legal Aid (1999 to 2017)
Judge Rosalind Michie	Amherst	March 31, 2017	Liberal	NS Public Prosecution Service (2001 to 2017)
Judge Amy Sakalauskas	Sydney	March 31, 2017	Liberal	NS Department of Justice
Judge Diane L. McGrath	Sydney	September 19, 2017	Liberal	NS Prosecution Service; NS Legal Aid; Private practice
Judge Anne Marie Simmons	Halifax	November 10, 2017	Liberal	Public Prosecution Service of Canada
Judge Chris Manning	Kentville	May 31, 2018	Liberal	Private practice NS Legal Aid
Associate Chief Judge Shane Russell	Sydney	December 10, 2021	PC	Ns Public Prosecution Service

Supernumerary judges

Name	Location	Date appointed	Appointed by	Prior position(s)
Judge Warren Zimmer	Truro	April 12, 2011; 2017 (Supernumerary)	NDP	Private practice (1984 to 2011); NS Public Prosecution Service (1978 to 1984)
Judge Marc C. Chisholm	Halifax	September 19, 2003; 2017 (Supernumerary)	PC	NS Public Prosecution Service (1980 to 2003)
Judge William Digby	Halifax	June 10, 1997; 2017 (Supernumerary)	Liberal	NS Legal Aid Director (1994 to 1997); NS Legal Aid
Judge Flora I. Buchan	Dartmouth	October 16, 1996; 2017 (Supernumerary)	Liberal	Private practice
Judge Patrick Curran	Halifax, Bedford	August 1, 1981 - 2003; 2003 - 2013 (Chief Judge)	PC	NS Legal Aid; City of Halifax; Private practice
Judge Alan T. Tufts	Kentville	January 21, 1998; June 28, 2013 (ACJ); May 31, 2018 (Supernumerary)	Liberal (1998); NDP (2013)	Private practice
Judge William J. Dyer	Bridgewater	1991 -		
Judge Claudine MacDonald	Kentville	February 20, 1996	Liberal	NS Public Prosecution Service
Judge John D. Comeau	Dartmouth	1981		

=== Previous Judges ===
Name	Location	Duration	Appointed By	Prior Position(s)
Judge Barbara Beach	Halifax, Youth	January 5, 1995 - October 31, 2021	Liberal	NS Legal Aid
Judge David J. Ryan	Dartmouth	October 1997 - March 4, 2020	Liberal	Private practice (1971 to 1997)
Judge Castor H.F. Williams	Halifax	February 20, 1996	Liberal	NS Public Prosecution Service
Judge Pierre Muise	Yarmouth	June 5, 2009 - August 6, 2010	PC	NS Public Prosecution Service (1996 to 2009)
Judge R. Brian Gibson	Dartmouth	1990 - ?	PC	Private practice (1973 to 1990)
Judge Anne S. Derrick	Halifax	September 2, 2005 - July 18, 2017	PC	Private practice
Judge Jamie Campbell	Halifax	September 2, 2005 - June 22, 2014	PC	
Judge Jean-Louis Batiot	Comeauville, Digby, Annapolis Royal	1987 - 2009	PC	
Judge Robert M. Prince	Yarmouth	1994 -	Liberal	
Judge Roy Edward "Bud" Kimball	Windsor and Kentville	May 4, 1967 - 1995	PC	Private practice (1960 to 1967)
Judge George Hughes Randall	Halifax	July 1, 1974 - 2012	Liberal	Private practice
Judge John Richard Nichols	Digby, Annapolis Royal	November 14, 1972 - August 31, 1997; August 31, 1997 - 2007 (Supernumerary)	Liberal	Private practice
Judge Clinton Roger Rand	Shelburne and Yarmouth	January 3, 1946 - June 30, 1976	Liberal	
Judge John Donald MacIntyre	Cape Breton	1951 - 1956	Liberal	
Judge William Ackley Richardson	New Glasgow, Stellarton, Pictou, and Tatamagouche	November 6, 1951 to November 30, 1968	Liberal	
Judge John Ferguson McDonald	Cape Breton	1953 to 1978	Liberal	
Judge Duncan John Chisholm		October 1, 1953 - February, 1980	Liberal	
Chief Judge Henry How		November 1983 - ??	PC	
Judge Joseph Francis McManus		1953 - 1961	Liberal	
Judge Vincent Gualbert LeBlanc		1971 - 1990	Liberal	
