= Jeremy Pemberton (judge) =

English barrister and judge

Jeremy Pemberton (1741 – 14 July 1790) was an English barrister who served a Chief Justice of Nova Scotia from 1788 to 1789.

== Biography ==
The grandson of Sir Francis Pemberton, briefly Lord Chief Justice of the King's Bench, Jeremy Pemberton was born in Cambridgeshire in 1741. He was called to the Bar by Lincoln’s Inn in 1762.
