= Malagash =

Community in Nova Scotia, Canada

Coordinates: 45.774°N 63.3762°W

Malagash in Nova Scotia

Malagash is a community in the Canadian province of Nova Scotia, located in Cumberland County.

Upper Malagash is on Nova Scotia Trunk 6, and just inland is Malagash Station on the former Intercolonial Railway, now part of the Trans Canada Trail.

Malagash was first settled by the Mi'kmaq, and translates to the "land of games".

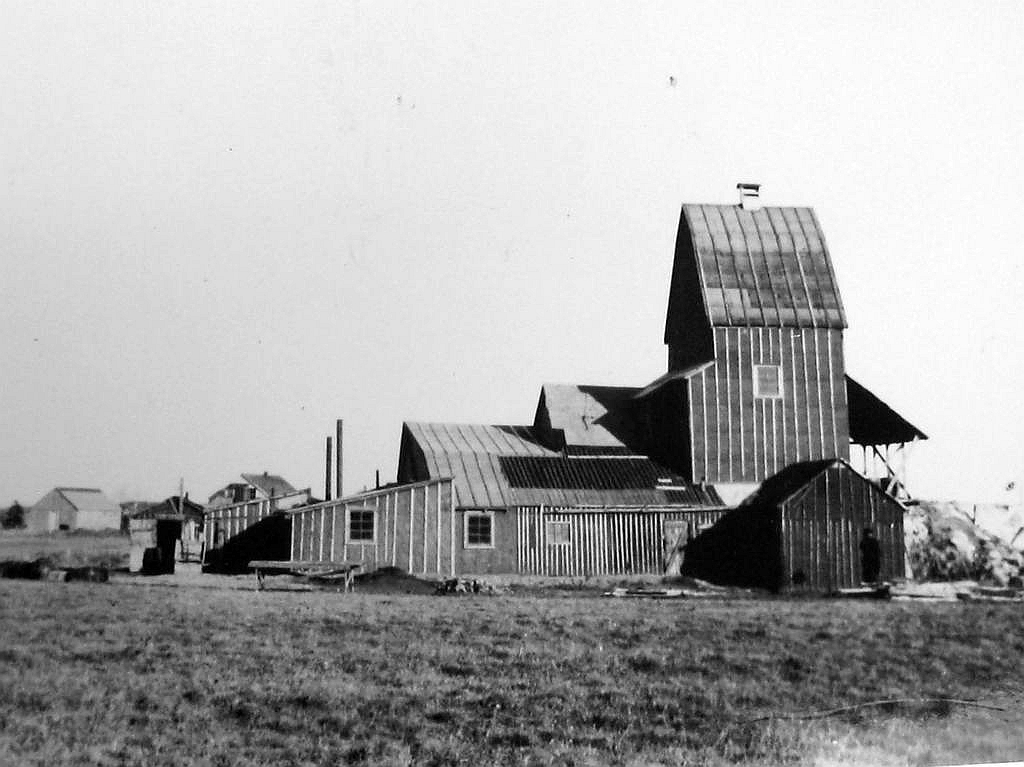
Salt mine in Malagash, 1923

Malagash is the location of Canada's first rock salt mine, which operated from 1918 through 1959 under the Malagash Salt Company. Despite there being a large amount of unmined salt left under Malagash, the mine was closed due to the shallow Malagash Harbour. A better harbour and rail spur existed at Pugwash, where a new shaft was sunk in 1956.

After the mine closed in 1959, the main industries in Malagash reverted to agriculture and fishing. A modern government wharf serves a small lobster and groundfish fleet. The Jost Winery produces wine from grapes grown in the temperate microclimate of Malagash, one of the few places in northern Nova Scotia where grapes can grow.

The Malagash School closed in 1982, one of the last one-room schools in Nova Scotia.

Malagash Bible Camp is a nondenominational Christian camp that is located in Malagash. Malagash Area Heritage Museum has displays about local history and the fishing, farming and salt industries.
