= Henry Bliss (author) =

Canadian lawyer (1797–1873)

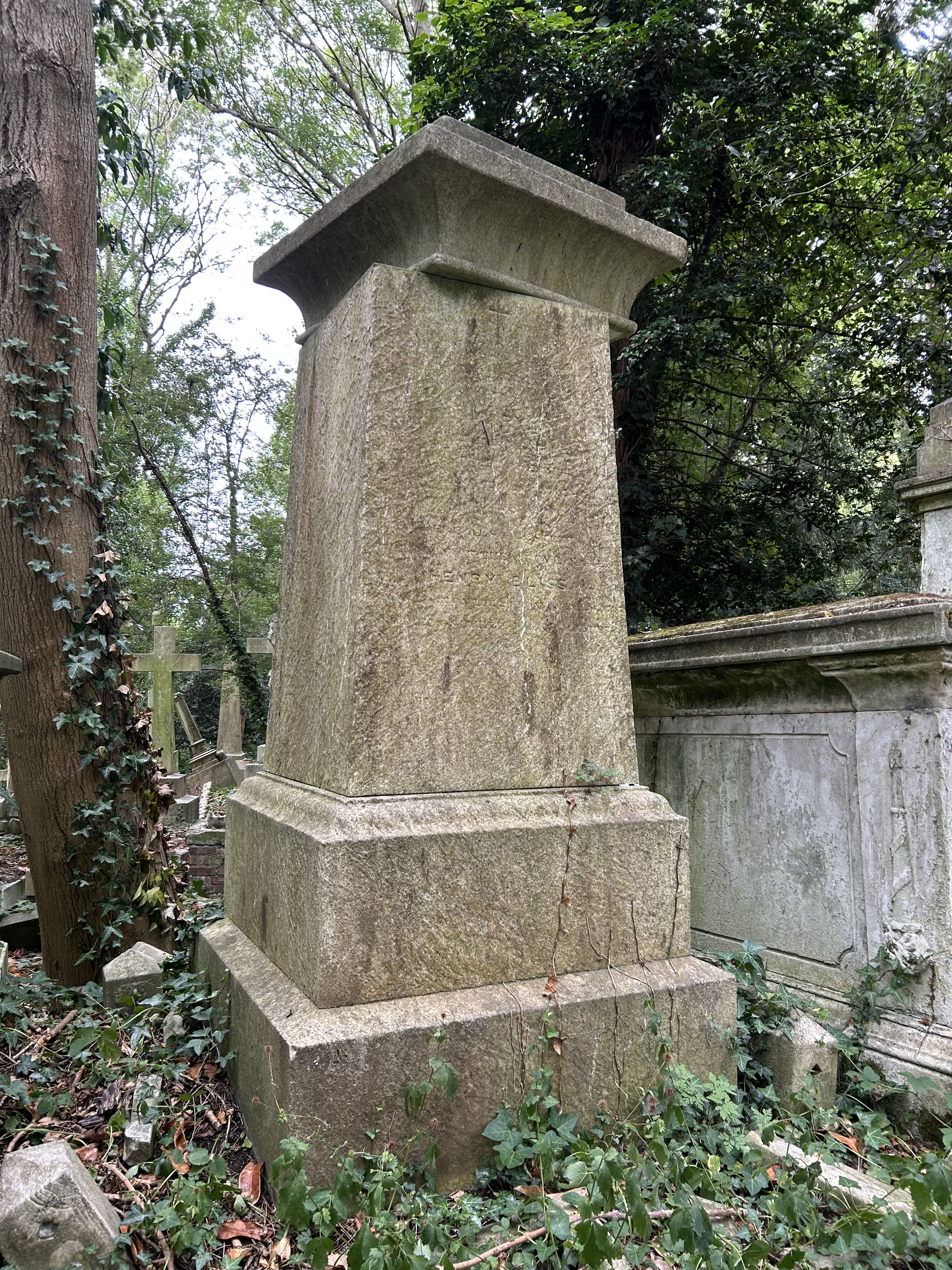
Grave of Henry Bliss in Highgate Cemetery

Henry Bliss (24 April 1797 – 31 July 1873) was the son of Jonathan Bliss, a chief justice of New Brunswick, and was, variously, an author, a lawyer, and a provincial agent for New Brunswick and Nova Scotia.

Henry and his brother William were educated at King's College, Nova Scotia. After graduation, his father had him appointed a clerk of the courts in New Brunswick. He lost this patronage appointment after his father's death and went to England where he became a lawyer. On his return to Canada, he was the provincial agent for New Brunswick and Nova Scotia which was an advocacy position for the provincial assemblies and the Colonial Office.

He died in London on 31 July 1873 and was buried on the west side of Highgate Cemetery.
