= Constance Glube =

Canadian judge

21st Chief Justice of Nova Scotia
- In office 1998 – December 31, 2004
- Nominated by: Jean Chrétien
- Preceded by: Lorne Clarke
- Succeeded by: J. Michael MacDonald

Personal details
- Born: November 23, 1931 Ottawa, Ontario, Canada
- Died: February 15, 2016 (aged 84) Halifax, Nova Scotia, Canada

Constance Rachelle Glube OC ONS (November 23, 1931 – February 15, 2016) was the 21st Chief Justice of Nova Scotia and first female provincial chief justice in Canada.

== Early life ==
Born Constance Lepofsky in Ottawa, she was the daughter of the late Samuel (1894–1956) and Pearl (Slonensky) Lepofsky (1900–1986). Glube attended McGill University and graduated with a Bachelor of Arts degree in 1952. In 1955, she graduated from Dalhousie Law School and was called to the bar in 1956.

== Judicial career ==
In 1982, she was appointed Chief Justice of the Supreme Court of Nova Scotia. In 1998 she was appointed Chief Justice of the Nova Scotia Court of Appeal, which included the title of Chief Justice of Nova Scotia. Glube retired effective December 31, 2004, and was replaced by J. Michael MacDonald.

One of the higher profile cases she heard, was for an injunction to halt the Richard Inquiry into the Westray Mine disaster. She ruled, on November 13, 1992, that the Inquiry was unconstitutional, because she viewed it as a criminal investigation that would force deponents to incriminate themselves. This was the first time in Canada a public inquiry was halted before any witnesses were heard. Her ruling was overturned by the Nova Scotia Court of Appeal on January 19, 1993, but did delay the inquiry until all charges went through the court system first.

== Awards ==
In 1997 she was a recipient of the Frances Fish Women Lawyers Achievement Award. Glube was made an Officer of the Order of Canada in 2006 for her part in serving the community as a legal trailblazer, including becoming the first female chief justice in Canada.

In 2009, the Nova Scotia branch of the Canadian Bar Association established the Contance R. Glube CBA Spirit Award to recognize achievement in law by Nova Scotian women lawyers.

== Death ==
On February 15, 2016, Glube died in Halifax, Nova Scotia.
