= Reasonable apprehension of bias =

Legal standard for disqualifying judges in Canada

In Canadian law, a reasonable apprehension of bias is a legal standard for disqualifying judges and administrative decision-makers for bias. Bias of the decision-maker can be real or merely perceived.

The test was first stated in Committee for Justice and Liberty v. Canada (National Energy Board), [1978] 1 S.C.R. 369:

...the apprehension of bias must be a reasonable one, held by reasonable and right minded persons, applying themselves to the question and obtaining thereon the required information. . . . [The] test is "what would an informed person, viewing the matter realistically and practically and having thought the matter through conclude."

— p. 394

It was further developed in:

“A reasonable apprehension of bias may be raised where an informed person, viewing the matter realistically and practically and having thought the matter through, would think it more likely than not that the decision maker would unconsciously or consciously decide the issue unfairly [emphasis added].”

Further:

"16. .... But there is one phrase in one sentence in the test that I think is wrong. I will underline the words I think are wrong in the sentence that contains them:

'... Would he think that it is more likely than not that [the decision-maker], whether consciously or unconsciously, would not decide fairly.'

In my opinion the simple question which requires an answer in each case is this: Is there a real possibility that a reasonable person, properly informed and viewing the circumstances realistically and practically, could conclude that the decision-maker might well be prone to bias?

I would not like to think that it would be in accordance with natural justice for a decision-maker to be equally likely to be biased as not to be biased. But that is what the test suggests in the words "more likely than not". The statement of the test as more likely to be biased than not simply cannot be right. And, as far as I can tell, it has never been endorsed by the Supreme Court of Canada or by this Court as the correct weighing to give to the respective degrees of likelihood in a reasonable apprehension of bias case."

Contrary evidence is addressed as follows:

"Further it has been established that, in dealing with an allegation of apprehension of bias, evidence which would have the effect of negating bias is irrelevant and is not to be considered. In Jones and de Villars, Principles of Administrative Law, 2d. ed., (Carswell, Toronto: 1994), the authors state at p. 365:

…common sense says that the delegate (or another party) can lead evidence to contradict that introduced by the applicant for the judicial review. The purpose of such evidence is to show that there is no reasonable apprehension of bias disclosed by the facts. On the other hand, it would appear to be wrong in principle to permit the delegate (or another party) to lead evidence to show that there was no actual bias, or no actual participation by a disqualified person in the decision. Such evidence is irrelevant to determining whether there is an apprehension of bias, and therefore is inadmissible.

[14] Similarly, in Dussault and Bourgeat, Administrative Law: A Treatise (Vol. 4), 2d. ed., (Carswell, Toronto: 1990), it is stated, at pp. 299-300: To have a decision by a public officer or agency set aside for bias, it is thus not necessary to prove without a doubt that prejudice or interest was present; only the existence of circumstances likely to give rise to an apprehension of bias need exist. As explained by Dickson J. of the Supreme Court in Kane v. Board of Governors of the University of British Columbia in discussing the sixth proposition upon which the appeal was based: The court will not inquire whether the evidence did work to the prejudice of one of the parties; it is sufficient if it might have done so."

...[17] In his reasons quoted above, the motions court judge refers to actual bias as opposed to dealing with the concept of reasonable apprehension of bias. The concepts are quite different and cannot be used interchangeably. It is an error in law to deal with the concept of actual as opposed to apprehended bias just as it is an error to place any weight or consideration on the fact that the adjudicating body might have reached a decision that appears to be eminently reasonable."

It is a difficult matter to establish case law to support such a proposition. Nevertheless, consider:

"[14] In R. v. Gushman, [1994] O.J. No. 813 (QL) (Ont. Ct. J. (Gen Div.)), Watt J. was dealing with the apprehension of bias in order to succeed in a complaint of jurisdictional error. Nevertheless, I find some of his statements to be apposite. At para. 32 he wrote:

It is trite that every allegation that judicial conduct gives rise to a reasonable apprehension of bias falls to be decided upon its own facts. It follows that a parade of authorities, parsing precedent in vain search of factual equivalents or reasonable facsimiles, is not to the purpose."

== Definition of apprehension ==
The dictionary definition of apprehension, outside of the Canadian legal context, provides two distinct meanings: anxiety about something, or the perception or grasp of something. It does not appear that a reasonable person—most likely a reasonable Canadian person—is required to differentiate along this axis in specific terms when affirming legal apprehension of bias.

== See also ==
- Conflict of interest
- R. v. R.D.S. (1997)
- Arsenault-Cameron v. Prince Edward Island (2000)
