= Ian MacKeigan =

Canadian lawyer and judge

Ian Malcolm MacKeigan (April 11, 1915 – May 1, 1996) was a Canadian lawyer and judge. He was Chief Justice of Nova Scotia from 1973 to 1985.

== Biography ==
A native of Saint John, New Brunswick, MacKeigan was educated in Moose Jaw and the University of Saskatchewan, before moving to Halifax, where he studied law at Dalhousie University, graduating in 1938. From 1940 to 1949, he served in Ottawa as a deputy enforcement administrator of the Wartime Prices and Trade Board, as well as a deputy commissioner of the Combines Investigation Commission.

He practiced law with MacKeigan, Cox, Downie and Mitchell in Halifax, eventually becoming a senior partner. He was chairman of the Atlantic Development Board from 1963 to 1969, and was a member of the Economic Council of Canada from 1965 to 1971. In 1969, he was appointed to the Public Service Arbitration Tribunal. He was a Queen's Counsel and served on several company boards.

In September 1973, he was appointed Chief Justice of Nova Scotia. He was the first chief justice of the province appointed directly from the bar since James McDonald in 1881.

He resigned in 1985 as a result of the controversy surrounding the wrongful conviction of Donald Marshall Jr. He continued to sit as a supernumerary judge until he reached the mandatory retirement age of 75 in 1996. He was later the lead appellant in Mackeigan v Hickman.
