= Canada Medal =

- Ribbon of the medal
- Country: Canada
- Eligibility: Both Canadians and others
- Post-nominals: CM (English); M du C (French)
- Status: Abolished 1966
- Established: 27 August 1943

Highlights
- Total: Never awarded

Order of Wear
- Next (higher): British Empire Medal
- Next (lower): Queen's Police Medal for Distinguished Service

The Canada Medal was an honour created in 1943 as part of an attempt to establish an indigenous honours system in Canada. It was meant to serve as the highest award that could be awarded to civilians and military personnel.

The increase in demand for civilian honours during the Second World War led to the creation of a committee to examine honours in Canada. While the committee mostly dealt with regulations regarding British honours, it did manage to have the Canada Medal created. Though established by Royal Warrant and added to the order of wear as early as 1947, the medal was never awarded.

The medal was abolished in 1966, just prior to the creation of the Order of Canada. Despite the fact that it was never awarded, it continued to appear in the official order of wear published in the London Gazette until 2019.

== Background ==
In the aftermath of the First World War there was a sense of dissatisfaction in how honours were distributed. The result was the passage of the Nickel Resolution. The resolution created a policy of not appointing Canadians to peerages or titular honours, and the government of Canada only making recommendation for a handful of non-titular honours.

In 1931, the Statute of Westminster reaffirmed the equality of the self-governing dominions of the British Empire, however there was no mechanism to establish honours specific to the dominions. In 1935, the Royal Canadian Mounted Police Long Service Medal was established as the first award specifically for service in Canada.

The Canadian government managed the creation of this medal by passing the recommendation on to the Dominions Office, who had experience with drafting Royal Warrants. In 1934, King George V signed the Royal Warrant creating the Royal Canadian Mounted Police Long Service Medal. Prime Minister R.B. Bennett countersigned the Royal Warrant on 15 December 1934, signifying that the King was acting on the advice of his Canadian Ministry.

During the Second World War, a group of senior government civil servants was put together in the Awards Co-ordination Committee (ACC). The ACC primarily dealt with questions in regards to British awards being presented to Canadians. At the same time a Parliamentary committee, the Special Committee on Honours and Awards, recommended the creation of a Canadian order. Though ultimately rejected, the suggested name 'Order of Canada' was eventually used for the new order established in 1967.

== Creation ==
Despite the failure of proposals for a Canadian order, the ACC managed to have the Canada Medal created. Using the same process as used to establish the RCMP Long Service Medal, a Royal Warrant establishing the medal was drafted and signed by George VI on 27 August 1943.

It was to be the preeminent distinguished service award for Canadians, both civilians and military personnel. The medal was to be awarded to Canadians and non-Canadians who provided, "specially valuable and meritorious service of a high standard...special service of a high degree of merit, such as discharge of special duties superior to the person's ordinary work...highly meritorious performance of ordinary duties where these have entailed work of a specifically trying character." Recipients would have been entitled to the post-nominal letters C.M, or M. du C for French speakers.

== Fate ==
The first honours list with awards of the Canada Medal was to be released on 11 November 1943. The list contained the King and other world leaders, as well as Canadian military personnel. However, the Prime Minister William Lyon Mackenzie King was not in favor of awarding the medal, and it was not awarded. While no further recommendations were made, it remained an official decoration of Canada until 1966, when the warrant creating the Canada Medal was revoked on the creation of the Order of Canada.

== Appearance ==
The Canada Medal was a round silver medal, suspended from a bar with the word MERIT or MERITE. The obverse bore the effigy of King George VI, surrounded by his titles. The reverse bore the Royal Arms of Canada above a scroll with the word CANADA, surrounded by a wreath of maple leaves. The only medals produced were stamped with the word specimen on the rim. The ribbon consisted of three equal stripes of red, white, and red, the same as the Canada General Service Medal.
