= Nova Scotia Supreme Court =

Superior court in the province of Nova Scotia

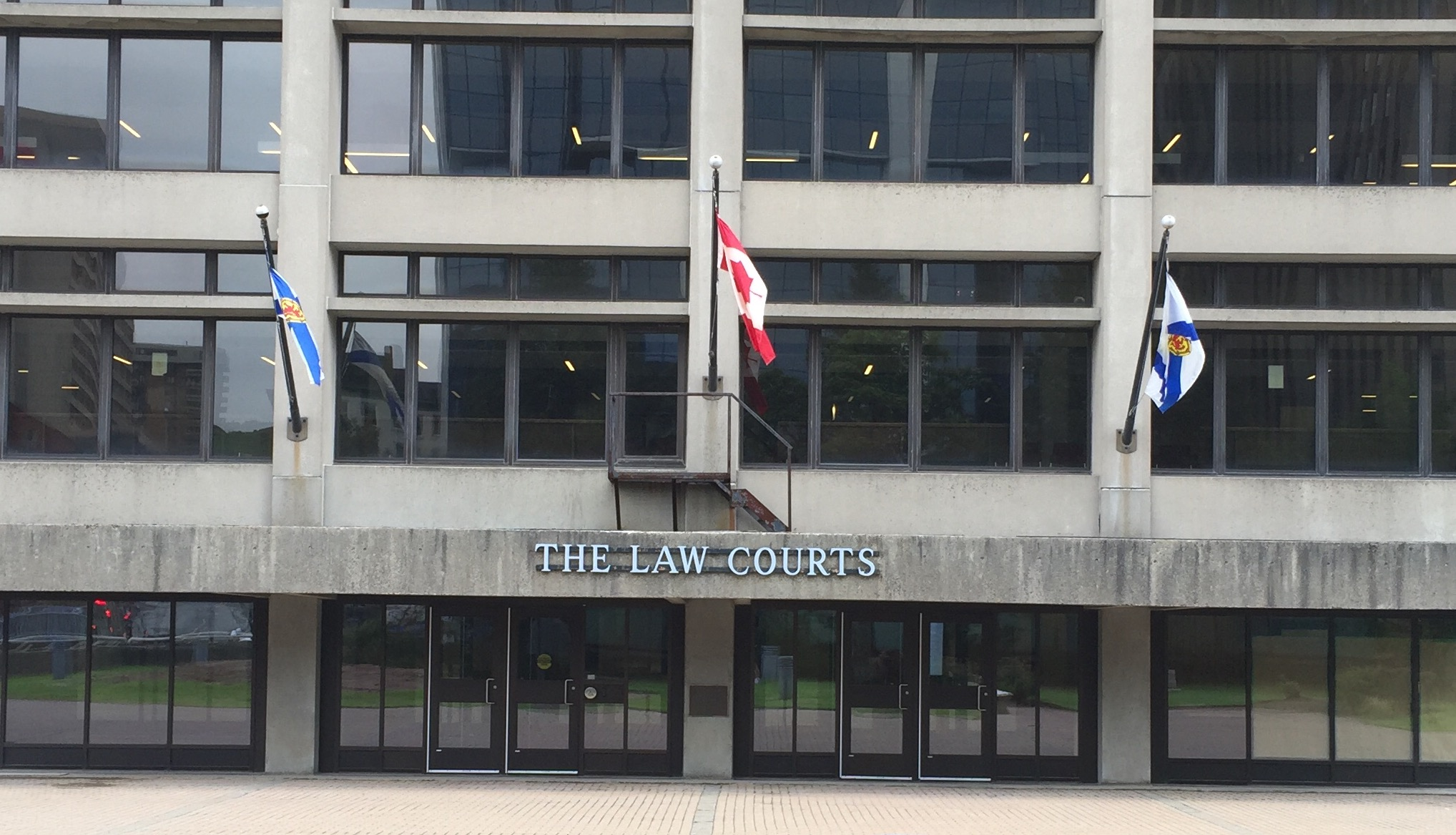
Supreme Court of Nova Scotia, Halifax, Nova Scotia

The Nova Scotia Supreme Court is a superior court in the province of Nova Scotia.

The Supreme Court consists of 25 judicial seats including the position of Chief Justice and Associate Chief Justice. At any given time there may be one or more additional justices who sit as supernumerary justices. The justices sit in 18 different locations around the province.

== Jurisdiction ==
As with all superior trial courts across the country, the court has inherent jurisdiction. It hears civil and criminal trials. The criminal trials can be judge alone or judge and jury. The court also hears appeals from the Provincial Court, small claims court, Family court, and various provincial tribunals.

Appeals of Supreme Court decisions are then made to the Nova Scotia Court of Appeal.

== History ==
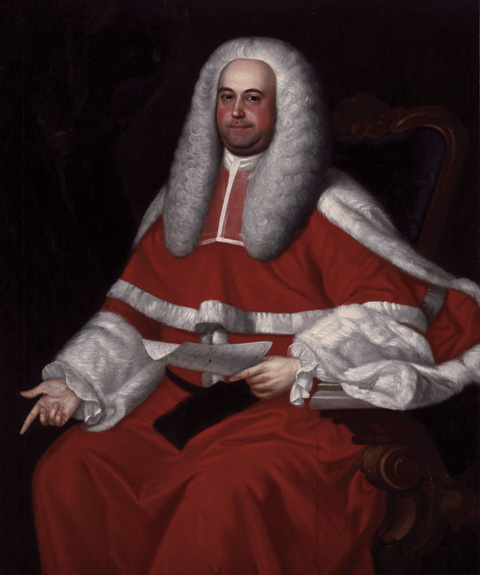
1st Chief Justice Jonathan Belcher by John Singleton Copley (1754), Court Room 4, Nova Scotia Supreme Court

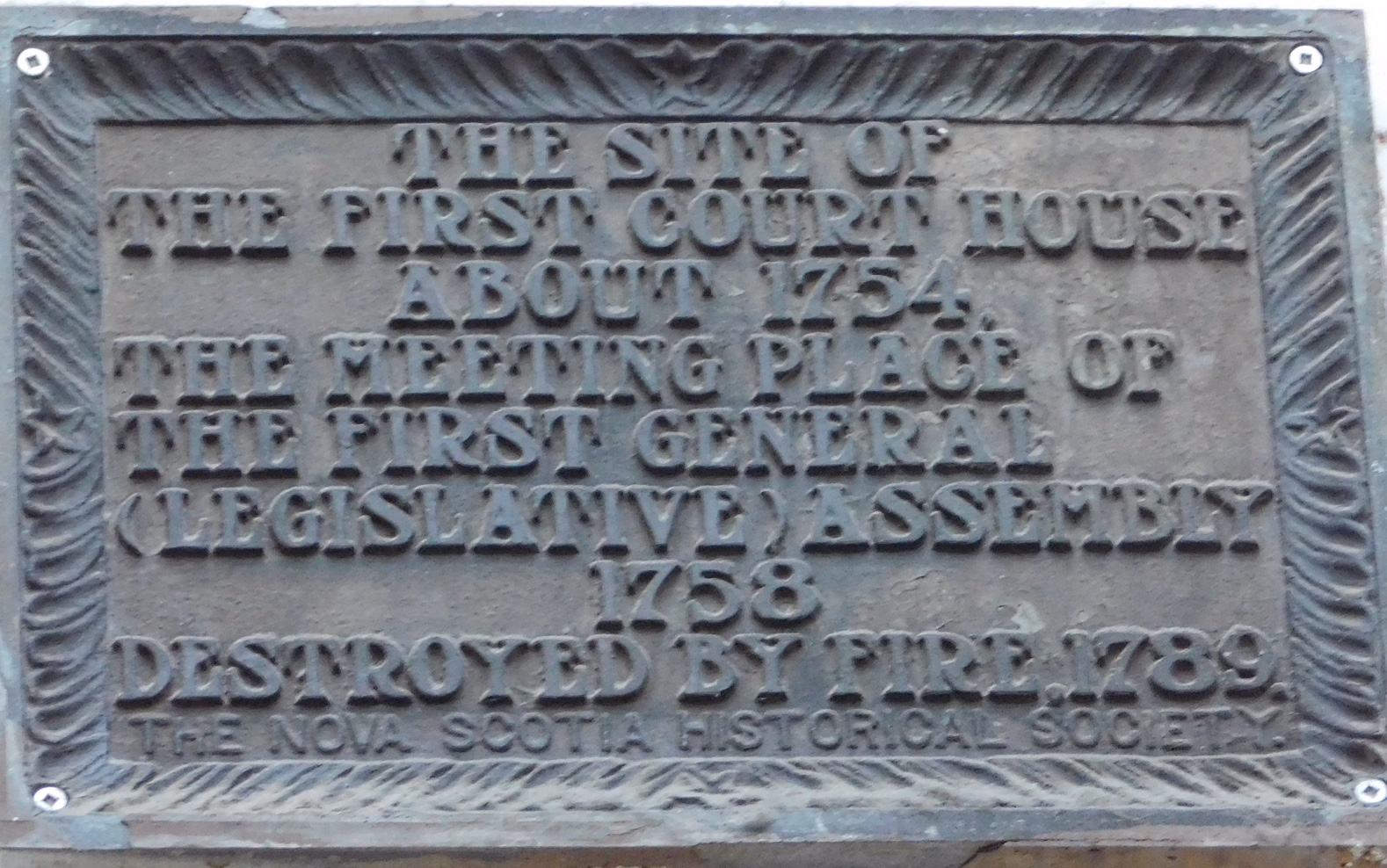
Site of First Court House Plaque, Royal Nova Scotia Historical Society, Scotia Square, Halifax, Nova Scotia

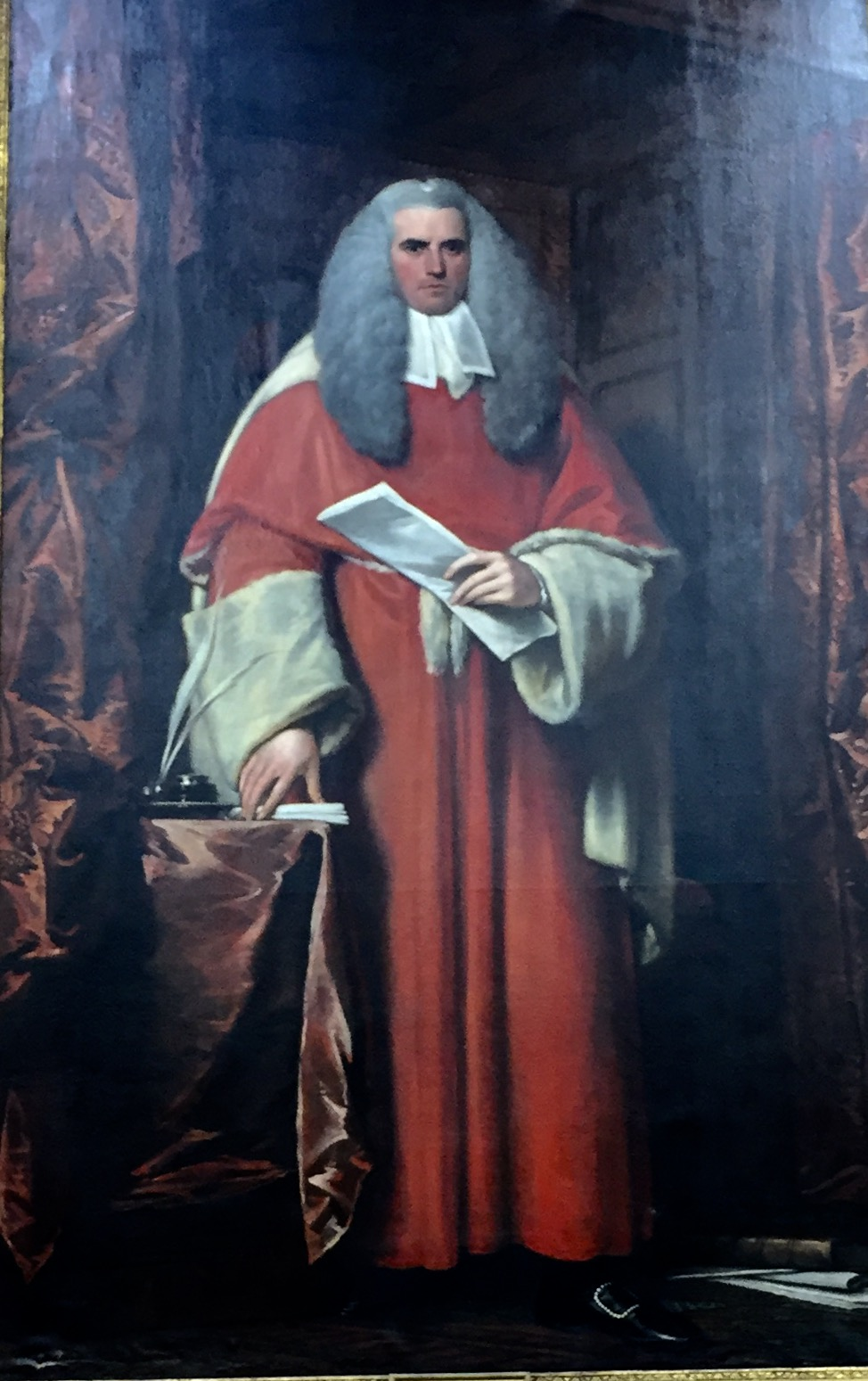
Thomas Andrew Lumisden Strange By Benjamin West, Nova Scotia Supreme Court, Court Room 5, Halifax, Nova Scotia, Canada

While the first court administering the Common Law was established in Annapolis Royal in 1721, the creation of a Supreme Court took place on October 21, 1754, several years before the Province was granted a legislative assembly. The court is the second oldest court in Canada and is among the oldest in North America.

Jonathan Belcher was appointed the first Chief Justice of the Nova Scotia Supreme Court. The court's jurisdiction extended to the entire colony, which, after the Treaty of Paris ended the war with France in 1763, includes present day Prince Edward Island, New Brunswick and eastern Maine.

In 1990, on the recommendation of the Nova Scotia Court Structure Task Force, the County and Supreme courts were merged to create a bench of 25 judges at the trial level. Since 1999, the Supreme Court also administers the Nova Scotia Family Division Court, with eight judges, that has jurisdiction over divorces and other family law cases in the Halifax and industrial Cape Breton.

== Supreme Court Family Division ==
The Supreme Court includes the Family Division which adjudicates matters of family law in the regions of Halifax and Cape Breton. As Supreme Court Justices, they have authority over both divorce as well as all other family law matters, unlike their provincial court counterparts who do not have the federal authority to adjudicate divorces.

== Justices of the Supreme Court ==
Name	Location	Date appointed	Appointed by	Prior position(s)
Chief Justice Deborah K. Smith	Halifax	2019	Trudeau	Associate Chief Justice of the Nova Scotia Supreme Court (2004–2019); Nova Scotia Supreme Court Justice (2001–2004); McInnes Cooper (1983 to 2001)
Associate Chief Justice Patrick J. Duncan	Halifax	2007	Harper	Nova Scotia Supreme Court Justice (2007–2020) Beveridge, MacPherson & Duncan (1986 to 2007); NS Legal Aid (1980 to 1986)
Justice Patrick Murray	Sydney	2010	Harper	Murray, Gouthro, Wall LLP (2002 to 2010); Gillis and Murray LLP Stewart, McKelvey, Stirling, Scales LLP (1991 to 2002)
Justice Pierre L. Muise	Yarmouth	2010	Harper	Provincial Court Judge (2009 to 2010) NS Public Prosecution Service (1996 to 2009)
Justice Peter Rosinski	Halifax	2010	Harper	NS Public Prosecution Service (1989 to 2010); Appeal Crown (2005 to 2010); McLean & Associates (1989); Margeson & Wilson (1988); MacIntosh, MacDonnell & MacDonald (1986 to 1988)
Justice James L. Chipman	Halifax	2013	Harper	Stewart McKelvey Sterling Scales LLP (1998 to 2013) Cox Downie (1992 to 1998)
Justice Joshua M. Arnold	Halifax	2013	Harper	Arnold Pizzo McKegan LLP (1996 to 2013); NS Crown Attorney
Justice Robin C. M. Gogan	Sydney	2013	Harper	Breton Law Group (2011 to 2013) Sampson McDougall (2002 to 2011)
Justice Denise Boudreau	Halifax	2013	Harper	Public Prosecution Service of Canada (2007 to 2013); NS Legal Aid (1998–2007); LeBlanc, MacDonald, and Pickup (1994 to 1998)
Justice Jamie Campbell	Halifax	2014	Harper	Provincial Court Judge (2005 to 2014) Cox Hanson (1983 to 2005)
Justice Jeffrey R. Hunt	Truro	2015	Harper	Patterson Law (1992 to 2015)
Justice D. Timothy Gabriel	Halifax	2016	Trudeau	Provincial Court Judge (2010 to 2016) Landry McGillivray (1982 to 2010)
Justice Ann E. Smith	Halifax	2016	Trudeau	Burchells LLP
Justice Christa Brothers	Halifax	2017	Trudeau	Stewart McKelvey Sterling Scales LLP
Justice John Bodurtha	Halifax	2018	Trudeau	Atlantic Regional Office, Justice Canada
Justice Darlene Jamieson	Halifax	2018	Trudeau	Merrick Jamieson Sterns Washington & Mahody
Justice Scott Norton	Halifax	2018	Trudeau	Stewart McKelvey
Justice John Keith	Halifax	2019	Trudeau	Weir Foulds, Toronto (1993–1999) Cox & Palmer, Halifax (2000–2019)
Justice Diane Rowe	Bridgewater	2020	Trudeau	Department of Justice
Justice Jean Dewolfe	Kentville	2021	Trudeau	Provincial Court of Nova Scotia
Justice Lloyd Berliner		2021	Trudeau	Patterson Law
Justice Gail Gatchalian	Halifax	2021	Trudeau	Pink Larkin Lawyers

Supernumerary
Name	Location	Date appointed	Appointed by	Prior position(s)
Justice Frank C. Edwards	Sydney	1993	Chrétien	
Justice Gerald R. P. Moir	Halifax	1997	Chrétien	Burchell, MacDougall (1984 to 1997); Federal Business Development Bank (1980 to 1984); Weldo, Misener & Covert (1977 to 1980)
Justice Robert William Wright	Halifax	1998	Chrétien	Daley, Black & Moreira
Justice C. Richard Coughlan	Bridgewater	2001	Chrétien	Coughlan and Coughlan
Justice Mona M. Lynch	Bridgewater	2002	Chrétien	Dept of Justice, Youth Crime; NS Legal Aid (1987 to 1999); Justice of Family Division; NS Legal Aid
Justice Gregory M. Warner	Kentville	2003	Chrétien	Warner, Jacquard; Pink Macdonald Harding; Town of Yarmouth
Justice Kevin Coady	Halifax	2003	Chrétien	Coady Filiter
Justice N. M. (Nick) Scaravelli	Pictou/Antigonish	2006	Harper	Macintosh MacDonnell & MacDonald (1977 to 2006) Fitzgerald and Assoc. (1974 to 1977)
Justice Glen G. McDougall	Halifax	2001	Chrétien	Sampson McDougall LLP (1983 to 2001)

=== Past Judges ===
Name	Location	Duration	Appointed by	Prior position(s)
Justice M. Heather Robertson		1998 to 2021	Jean Chrétien	Chief of Staff to the Premier of Nova Scotia (1995); Burchell, MacDougall (1986 to 1998); Walker, Dunlop (1985 to 1986)
Chief Justice Joseph Phillip Kennedy		1997 to 2019	Jean Chrétien	Chief Justice of the Supreme Court of Nova Scotia (1998 to 2019); Chief Judge of Provincial Court (1993 to 1997); Provincial Court Judge (1978 to 1993); Kenney, Theakson, Kennedy & Allen (1969 to 1978)
Justice Felix A. Cacchione		1986 to 2018	Brian Mulroney	Private Practice; Nova Scotia Legal Aid
Justice Elizabeth Van den Eynden		2013 to 2015	Stephen Harper	MacIntosh, MacDonnell & MacDonald (1988 to 2013)
Justice Arthur W. D. Pickup		2002 to 2016	Jean Chrétien	LeBlanc, MacDonald & Pickup (1975 to 2002)
Justice Linda Lee Oland		1998 to 2000	Jean Chrétien	McInnes, Cooper & Robertson (1976 to 1998)
Justice Arthur Joseph LeBlanc		1998 to 2017	Jean Chrétien	
Justice Joseph Michael MacDonald		1995 to 2005	Jean Chrétien	
Justice Marlene Jill Hamilton		1995 to 2001	Jean Chrétien	
Justice John Edward Flinn		1995 to 2002	Jean Chrétien	
Justice J. Edward Scanlan		1993 to 2015		
Justice Hiram Joseph Carver		1993 to 2005		
Justice Nancy Jean Bateman		1993 to 1995		
Justice Charles Edward Haliburton		January 1993 to 2013	Brian Mulroney	Eric Kinsman (1962 to 1986), Member of Parliament (1972 to 1974, 1979 to 1980)
Justice Ian Palmeter		1993 to 1997		County Court Judge (1985 to 1993)
Justice Simon James MacDonald		1993 to 2016	Brian Mulroney	County Court Judge (1982 to 1993); Crown attorney MacIntyre, MacDonald & Gillis federal Department of Justice
Justice Donald MacKinnon Hall		1993 to 2006		County Court Judge (1982 to 1993)
Justice Douglas Lawrence MacLennan		1993 to unknown		
Justice Norman Robert Anderson		1993 to 1998		
Justice Hugh John MacDonnell		1993 to 1995		
Justice Murray James Ryan		1993 to 1994		
Justice Ronald Newton Pugsley		1993 to 2000		
Justice Jamie William Sutherland Saunders		1990 to 2015	Brian Mulroney	
Justice David William Gruchy		1990 to 2007	Brian Mulroney	
Justice Walter Robert Evans Goodfellow		1990 to 2009	Brian Mulroney	
Justice Allan Paul Boudreau		March 30, 1990 to 2007; 2007 to October 31, 2016 (Supernumerary)	Brian Mulroney	Crawford, Boudreau & Khattar (1975 to March 30, 1990)
Justice Gerald B. Freeman		1990 to 1993	Brian Mulroney	County Court Judge (1988 to 1990)
Justice Elizabeth Ann MacKinnon Roscoe		1989 to 1992	Brian Mulroney	
Justice David Ritchie Chipman		1987 to 2000	Brian Mulroney	
Justice John McNab Davison		1987 to 2008	Brian Mulroney	
Justice Gordon Alfred Tidman		1985 to 2007	Brian Mulroney	
Justice Francis Bernard William Kelly		1985 to 2009	Brian Mulroney	
Justice Kenneth McNeill Matthews		1985 to 1997	Brian Mulroney	
Justice Robert Buckley MacDonald		1985 to 1995	Brian Mulroney	
Justice Hilroy Selig Nathanson		1982 to 2007		
Justice Daniel Merlin Nunn		1982 to 2005		
Justice Lorne Otis Clarke		1981 to 1997		
Justice Roderick MacLeod Rogers		1981 to 1998		
Justice Peter M. Nicholson	Digby, Annapolis Royal	1981 to 1986		
Justice Charles Denne Burchell		1979 to 1989		
Justice Kenneth Peter Richard		1978 to 2007		
Justice Leonard Lawson Pace		1978 to 1990		
Justice Constance Rachlle Glube		1977 to 1998		
Justice James Doane Hallett		1977 to 1990		
Justice William Johnston Grant		1977 to 1995		
Justice Angus Lewis Macdonald		1973 to 1992		
Justice Alexander Murdoch Macintosh		1973 to 1991		
Justice Ian Malcolm MacKeigan		1973 to 1990		
Justice Vincent Alan James Morrison		1973 to 1987		
Justice Malachi Cornelius Hubert Jones		1970 to 1979		
Justice Gordon Leavitt Shaw Hart		1968 to 1999		
Justice Donald Joseph Gillis		1968 to 1973		
Justice Arthur Gordon Cooper		1968 to 1983		
Justice Justin Louis Dubisky (1967–1976)		1967 to 1976		
Justice Gordon Stewart Cowan		1966 to 1981		
Justice Alexander Hugh McKinnon		1966 to 1973		
Justice Ronald Manning Fielding		1965 to 1972		
Justice Vincent Joseph Pottier		1965 to 1970		
Justice Thomas Herbert Coffin		1961 to 1981		
Justice Frederick William Bissett		1961 to 1977		
Justice Frank Harris Patterson		1958 to 1965		
Justice Vincent Christopher MacDonald		1950 to 1964		
Justice Lauchlin Daniel Currie		1949 to 1968		
Justice James Lorimer Ilsley		1949 to 1967		
Justice Eugene Troop Parker		1948 to 1961		
Justice Josiah H. MacQuarrie		1947 to 1968		
Justice John Stanley Smiley		1938 to 1945		
Justice Joseph Andrew Chisholm		1916 to 1950		
Justice Robert Edward Harris		1915 to 1931		
Justice James Johnston Ritchie		1912 to 1925		
Justice Wallace Nesbit Graham		1889 to 1917		
Justice Charles James Townshend		1887 to 1904		
Justice James McDonald		1881 to 1904		
Justice Robert Linton Weatherbe		1878 to 1907		
Justice John William Ritchie		1873 to 1882		
Justice William Frederick DesBarres		1848 to 1881		
Justice Arthur Drysdale		1907 to 1922		
Justice Humphrey Mellish		1918 to 1937		
Justice William Young		1860 to 1881		
Justice Sampson Salter Blowers		1797 to 1833		
Justice John Sparrow David Thompson		1882 to 1885		
Justice Benjamin Russell		1904 to 1935		
Justice James Wilberforce Longley		1905 to 1922		
Justice Joseph Norman		1885 to 1904		
Justice William F. Carroll		1925 to 1949		
Justice Alexander James		1877 to 1889		
Justice William Lorimer Hall		1931 to 1958		
Justice Brenton Halliburton		1807 to 1860		
Justice Lewis Morris Wilkins		1856 to 1876		
Justice William Blowers Bliss		1834 to 1869		
Justice Thomas Chandler Haliburton		1841 to 1856		
Justice Peleg Wiswall		1816 to 1836		
Justice Richard John Uniacke Jr.		1830 to 1834		

== Judges of the Supreme Court Family Division ==
Name	Location	Date appointed	Appointed by	Prior position(s)
Associate Chief Justice Lawrence I. O'Neil	Halifax	September 19, 2007	Stephen Harper	Justice of Family Division (19 September 2007 to present); NS Legal Aid, Antigonish (1999 to 2007); Pickup & MacDowell (1997 to 1999); Advisor to the Prime Minister of Canada (1990 to 1993); Sole Practitioner (1989 to 1990); Member of Parliament (1984 to November 21, 1988); Assistant to the Premier of Nova Scotia (1980 to 1982)
Justice Leslie J. Dellapinna	Halifax	June 7, 2001	Jean Chrétien	Cox Hanson O'Reilly Matheson
Justice Theresa M. Forgeron	Sydney	June 24, 2005	Paul Martin	H. F. MacIntyre and Associates
Justice Kenneth Haley	Sydney	July 31, 2008	Stephen Harper	Crown attorney (1984 to 2008); MacLellan, MacDonald & Haley (1980 to 1984)
Justice Elizabeth Jollimore	Halifax	November 28, 2008	Stephen Harper	Stewart McKelvey (1988 to 2008); Olsers (1987 to 1988)
Justice Beryl A. MacDonald	Halifax	March 24, 2005	Paul Martin	Hicks, LeMoine
Justice Robert M. Gregan	Sydney	June 24, 2015	Stephen Harper	NS Legal Aid; Hicks, Lemoine (1991 to 2003)
Justice Robert Ferguson	Halifax	March 24, 1999	Chrétien	McIntyre, Gillis & Ferguson (1962 to 1971); Family Court Judge (1971 to 1999)
Justice Carole A. Beaton	Halifax	February 4, 2011	Stephen Harper	Provincial court (2002 to 2011); Beaton Blaikie (1994 to 2002); Sole practitioner (1992 to 1994); Creighton & Shatford (1988 to 1992)
Justice C. Lou Ann Chiasson	Halifax	February 6, 2015	Stephen Harper	Weldon McInnes (2000 to 2015); Chiasson McClure (1995 to 2000); Sole practitioner (1994 to 1995); Burchell MacAdam & Hayman (1992 to 1994)
Justice Cindy G. Cormier	Halifax	October 10, 2014	Stephen Harper	Department of Justice
Justice R. Lester Jesudason	Halifax	May 5, 2015	Stephen Harper	Blois Nickerson (1997 to 2015)
Justice Pamela J. MacKeigan	Halifax	October 20, 2016	Justin Trudeau	Blois Nickerson; NS Legal Aid
Justice Lee Anne MacLeod-Archer	Sydney	April 11, 2014	Stephen Harper	Stewart McKelvey Stirling Scales (1992 to 2002); LaFosse MacLeod (2002 to 2014)
Justice Cindy Murray	Halifax	July 18, 2017	Justin Trudeau	NS Legal Aid (1993 to 2017)

Supernumerary
Name	Location	Date of appointment	Prior position(s)
Justice R. James Williams	Halifax	March 24, 1999	Walker, Dunlop (1986 to 1987); Blois, Nickerson, Palmeter and Bryson (1987 to 1999)
Justice Moira C. Legere-Sers	Port Hawkesbury	March 24, 1999	NS Legal Aid (1993 to 1999); Maritime Life Assurance Company (1980 to 1984); Boyne Clarke (1977 to 1980)
Justice Deborah Gass	Halifax	March 24, 1999	Executive Director of the Penitentiary Legal Services (1979 to 1991); Wright, Chivers & Co (1977)
Justice Darryl W. Wilson	Sydney	March 24, 1999	Family Court Judge (1985 to 1999); Crown Attorney (1980 to 1982); Edwards & Wilson (1976 to 1980)

Retired
Name	Location	Duration	Appointed By	Prior position(s)
Justice Douglas C. Campbell	Halifax	1999 - 2016	Jean Chrétien	Cox Hansen O'Reilly Matheson (1974 to March 30, 1999)
Justice J. Vernon MacDonald	Sydney	1999 - 2005	Jean Chrétien	Khattar & Khattar (1973 to 1975, 1978 to 1982); Nova Scotia Legal Aid (1975 to 1978); Sole practitioner (1982 to 1985); Family Court Judge (1985 to 1999)
Justice M. Clare MacLellan	Sydney	1999 – 2007	Jean Chrétien	Nova Scotia Legal Aid (1977 to 1981); Children's Aid Society (1988 to 1995); Family Court Judge (1995 to 1999)
