= Sampson Salter Blowers =

Loyalist American lawyer active in the late 1700s

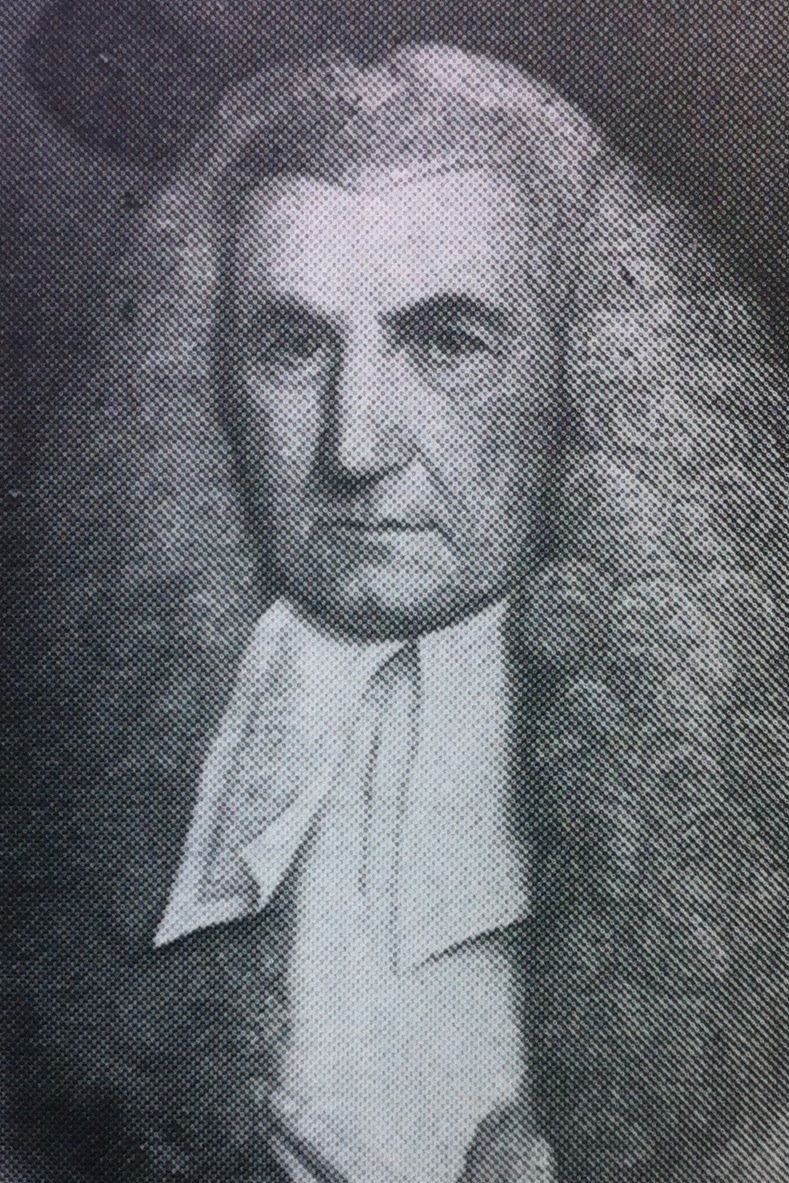
Sampson Salter Blowers (inset), Law Courts, Nova Scotia

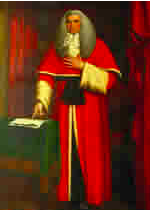
Sampson Salter Blowers by John Poad Drake

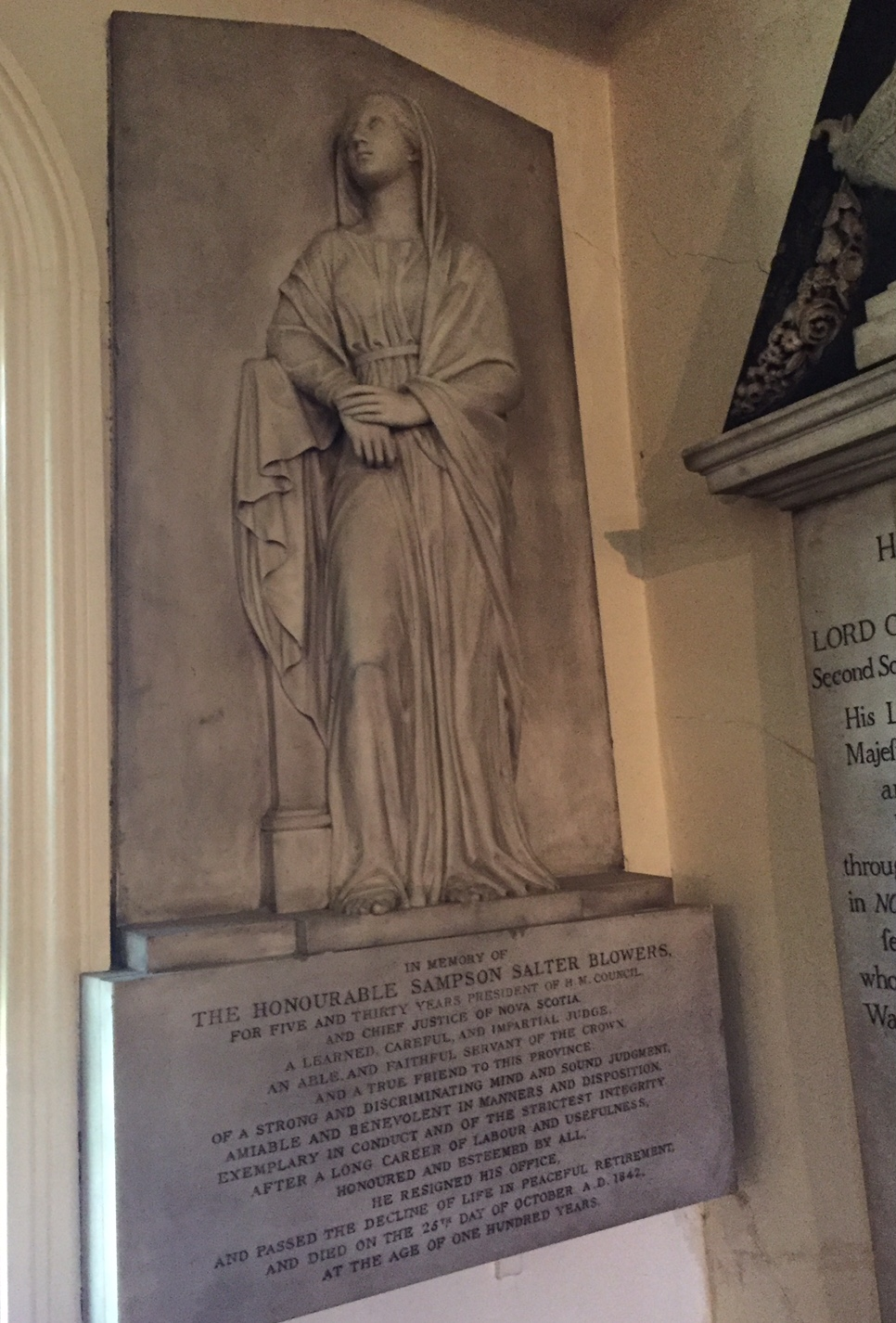
Sampson Salters Blowers, sculpture by Richard Westmacott, St. Paul's Church, Halifax

Sampson Salter Blowers (March 10, 1742 – October 25, 1842) was a North American lawyer, Loyalist and jurist from Nova Scotia who, along with Chief Justice Thomas Andrew Lumisden Strange, waged "judicial war" in his efforts to free Black Nova Scotian slaves from their owners, leading to the decline of slavery in Nova Scotia.

== Career ==
After graduating with a Master of Arts from Harvard College in 1765, he studied law at Thomas Hutchinson's office. He became a barrister at the Massachusetts Superior Court in 1770. His home on Southack's Court (present-day Phillips Street) at Beacon Hill, Boston bordered on the properties of John Hancock, John Winthrop and John Phillips (mayor). A very successful trial lawyer, he worked with Josiah Quincy and John Adams in defending the soldiers involved in the Boston Massacre, a March 1770 confrontation in which British soldiers fired into a crowd of a few hundred Bostonians who had been verbally harassing and throwing projectiles at them.

Considered a Loyalist, he was forced to relocate to England in 1774. He resettled in America in 1777, in Newport, Rhode Island (then still under British control) as a judge in the vice admiralty court, later moving to New York, and then in 1783 moved permanently to Halifax, Nova Scotia.

In Halifax he built a busy law practice, and in 1784 was named attorney general of Nova Scotia. The following year, he was appointed attorney general for New Brunswick but refused the post, not wanting to relocate his family. Later that year, he was named attorney general for Nova Scotia. In 1785, he was elected to the Nova Scotia House of Assembly for Halifax County and was chosen to be speaker for the assembly. In 1788, he was named to the Nova Scotia Council.

Because Blowers put the onus on slave owners to prove that they had a legal right to purchase slaves, slavery died out in Nova Scotia early in the 1800s, unlike in New Brunswick, where Chief Justice George Duncan Ludlow had ruled that slavery was legal.

== Personal life ==
The young Sampson Salter Blowers became an orphan after his father died soon after his return from the Siege of Louisbourg. Blowers was raised by his grandfather, Sampson Salter. In 1774, he married Sarah Kent, daughter of Massachusetts Attorney General Benjamin Kent. In Halifax Blowers lived at the corner of Barrington Street and the street now named after him. Blowers died in Halifax in 1842, aged 100, soon after he broke his hip in a fall. Most of his estate went to his adopted daughter, Sarah Ann Anderson, who had married William Blowers Bliss. He is buried in the crypt of St. Paul's Church (Halifax) and his wife is buried in Camphill Cememtery. Although he lost a substantial amount of property in the American War of Independence, he regained his wealth in Nova Scotia, leaving a large estate to his adopted daughter.
