= J. Michael MacDonald =

Canadian lawyer

The Honourable J. Michael MacDonald

22nd Chief Justice of Nova Scotia
- In office December 31, 2004 – January 31, 2019
- Nominated by: Paul Martin
- Appointed by: Irwin Cotler
- Preceded by: Constance Glube
- Succeeded by: Duncan Beveridge (acting)

Justice of the Supreme Court of Nova Scotia
- In office April 4, 1995 – December 31, 2004
- Nominated by: Jean Chrétien
- Appointed by: Allan Rock

Personal details
- Born: 1954 (age 71–72) Sydney, Nova Scotia

Joseph Michael MacDonald CM ONS (born 1954) is a Canadian lawyer who previously served as the 22nd Chief Justice of the Nova Scotia from 2004 to 2019.

== Early life and education ==
Raised in the Whitney Pier neighbourhood of Sydney, Nova Scotia, MacDonald received a Bachelor of Arts from Mount Allison University in 1976 and then graduated from Dalhousie Law School in 1979. He received an Honorary Doctorate of Laws from Cape Breton University in 2018.

== Legal career ==
MacDonald began his career working as a lawyer in the Sydney, Nova Scotia office of Boudreau, Beaton & LaFosse, which later merged with Stewart McKelvey Stirling Scales.

In 1995, MacDonald was appointed to the Supreme Court of Nova Scotia, and was elevated to Associate Chief Justice in 1998. He became the 22nd Chief Justice of Nova Scotia and the Chief Justice of the Nova Scotia Court of Appeal on December 31, 2004, replacing Constance Glube. The Honourable J. Michael MacDonald retired as Chief Justice of Nova Scotia, effective January 31, 2019.

On July 23, 2020, it was announced by Nova Scotia Justice Minister Mark Furey and federal Minister of Public Safety and Emergency Preparedness Bill Blair that MacDonald would serve on a 3-person Independent Review Panel concerning the RCMP response to the mass shooting that occurred in Nova Scotia on April 18 and 19, 2020. Families of the 22 victims killed during the shooting reacted to the announcement with disappointment, as they had been calling for a full public inquiry.

In 2024, MacDonald was made a Member of the Order of Nova Scotia. He was made a Member of the Order of Canada in 2025.
