= List of Canadian university leaders =

This list of Canadian university leaders includes the chancellors and vice-chancellors of Canadian universities. In most cases, the chancellor is an outside ceremonial head, while the vice-chancellor is the on-site academic leader. The vice-chancellor usually holds the position of president.

== Universities with both a Chancellor and Vice-Chancellor ==
University	Province/Territory	Chancellor	Vice-Chancellor/President
Acadia University	Nova Scotia	Nancy McCain	Jeff Hennessy
Algoma University	Ontario	Mario Turco (until 2028)	Kofi Campbell
Bishop's University	Quebec	Daniel Fournier	Sébastien Lebel-Grenier (principal; until 2028)
Brandon University	Manitoba	Mary Jane McCallum	Christine Bovis-Cnossen
Brock University	Ontario	Hilary Pearson	Lesley Rigg
Capilano University	British Columbia	Debra Doucette	Jason Dewling (2026–2031)
Cape Breton University	Nova Scotia	Annette Verschuren	David Wheeler
Carleton University	Ontario	Nik Nanos	Wisdom Tettey
Concordia University	Quebec	Jonathan Wener	Graham Carr
Concordia University of Edmonton	Alberta	Alan Huehn	Tim Loreman
Crandall University	New Brunswick	Donald Simmonds	Bruce Fawcett
Dalhousie University	Nova Scotia	Rustum Southwell	Kim Brooks (until 2028)
Emily Carr University of Art and Design	British Columbia	Carleen Thomas	Trish Kelly
Huntington University	Ontario	Bela Ravi	Kevin McCormick
Kwantlen Polytechnic University	British Columbia	Kim Baird	Bruce Choy
Lakehead University	Ontario	Rita Shelton Deverell	Gillian Siddall
Laurentian University	Ontario	Kristan Straub	Lynn Wells
McGill University	Quebec	Pierre Boivin	Deep Saini
McMaster University	Ontario	Santee Smith	David Farrar
Memorial University of Newfoundland	Newfoundland and Labrador	Earl Ludlow	Janet Morrison
Mount Allison University	New Brunswick	George L. Cooper	Ian Sutherland
Mount Royal University	Alberta	Arlene Strom	Timothy Rahilly
Mount Saint Vincent University	Nova Scotia	Joël Dickinson (acting since May 2025)	Joël Dickinson
Nipissing University	Ontario	Scott Russell	Kevin Wamsley
OCAD University	Ontario	Jamie Watt	Ana Serrano
Queen's University at Kingston	Ontario	Shelagh Rogers	Patrick Deane (principal)
Royal Military College of Canada	Ontario	David McGuinty (ex-officio as Minister of National Defence)	Jill Scott (principal)
Royal Roads University	British Columbia	Nelson Chan	Philip Steenkamp
St. Francis Xavier University	Nova Scotia	Mila Mulroney	Andrew Haken
Saint Mary's University	Nova Scotia	Michael Durland	Michael Khan
Simon Fraser University	British Columbia	Tamara Vrooman	Joy Johnson
St. Thomas University	New Brunswick	Graydon Nicholas	M. Nauman Farooqi
Thompson Rivers University	British Columbia	DeDe DeRose	Arini
Toronto Metropolitan University	Ontario	Donette Chin-Loy Chang	Mohamed Lachemi
Trent University	Ontario	Zabeen Hirji (until June 2029)	Cathy Bruce
University of Alberta	Alberta	Nizar Somji (until 2028)	Bill Flanagan
University of British Columbia	British Columbia	Judy Rogers	Benoit-Antoine Bacon
University of Calgary	Alberta	Jon Cornish	Ed McCauley
University of the Fraser Valley	British Columbia	Jo-Ann Archibald	James Mandigo
University of Guelph	Ontario	Mary Anne Chambers	Rene Van Acker
University of King's College	Nova Scotia	Debra Deane Little	William Lahey
University of Lethbridge	Alberta	Terry Whitehead	Digvir Jayas
University of Manitoba	Manitoba	David Angus	Michael Benarroch
Université de Moncton	New Brunswick	Madeleine Dubé	Denis Prud’homme
Université de Montréal	Quebec	Frantz Saintellemy	Daniel Jutras
University of New Brunswick	New Brunswick	Wade MacLauchlan	Paul Mazerolle
University of Northern British Columbia	British Columbia	Darlene McIntosh	Bill Owen (interim)
Université de l'Ontario français	Ontario	Paul Rouleau	Norman Labrie
University of Ontario Institute of Technology	Ontario	Mitch Frazer	Steven A. Murphy
University of Ottawa	Ontario	Claudette Commanda	Marie-Eve Sylvestre
University of Prince Edward Island	Prince Edward Island	Diane Griffin (until June 30, 2027)	Wendy Rogers
University of Regina	Saskatchewan	Cadmus Delorme	Jeff Keshen
Université Sainte-Anne	Nova Scotia	Noël Després	Kenneth Deveau
University of Saskatchewan	Saskatchewan	Scott Banda	Peter Stoicheff
University of Toronto	Ontario	Wesley J. Hall	Melanie Woodin
University of Victoria	British Columbia	Marion Buller	Rhonda McEwen
University of Waterloo	Ontario	Jagdeep Singh Bachher (until June 2027)	Vivek Goel
University of Western Ontario	Ontario	Kelly Meighen	Alan Shepard
University of Windsor	Ontario	Dwight Duncan	John-Justin McMurty
University of Winnipeg	Manitoba	Barb Gamey	Jino Distasio (interim)
Vancouver Island University	British Columbia	Judith Sayers	Dennis Johnson (interim for up to two years until June 2027)
Wilfrid Laurier University	Ontario	Eileen Mercier	Deborah MacLatchy
York University	Ontario	Kathleen Taylor	Rhonda Lenton
Yukon University	Yukon	Carol Geddes (until September 2028)	Shelagh Rowles

== Universities with only a Vice-Chancellor ==
University	Province/Territory	Vice-Chancellor/President
Alberta University of the Arts	Alberta	Janis Goldie
Atlantic School of Theology	Nova Scotia	Heather McCance
Athabasca University	Alberta	Alex Clark
Canadian Mennonite University	Manitoba	Cheryl Pauls
MacEwan University	Alberta	Annette Trimbee
Nova Scotia College of Art and Design University	Nova Scotia	David B. Smith (interim, until January 1, 2027)
St. Stephen's University	New Brunswick	Bradley Jersak (principal) Andrew Phillip Klager (vice-chancellor)
Trinity Western University	British Columbia	Toddy Martin
Université Laval	Quebec	Sophie D'Amours (rector)
Université de Saint-Boniface	Manitoba	Sophia Bouffard
University Canada West	British Columbia	Bashir Makhoul
University of Fredericton	New Brunswick	Don Roy
University of Niagara Falls Canada	Ontario	David Gray
Yorkville University	New Brunswick	Julia Christensen Hughes

== Longevity ==
Since the development of the university sector in Canada a small number of Vice Chancellors or Presidents or Principals have served for 20 years or more. They include:

University	Province	Name	Years served
McGill University	Quebec	Sir John William Dawson	38 years (1855–1893)
University of New Brunswick	New Brunswick	Cecil Jones	34 years (1906–1940)
Bishop's University	Quebec	Jasper Hume Nicolls	33 years (1845–1878)
University of Toronto	Ontario	John McCaul	32 years (1848–1880)
University of New Brunswick	New Brunswick	Edwin Jacob	31 years (1829–1860)
Dalhousie University	Nova Scotia	John Forrest	26 years (1885–1911)
Bishop's University	Quebec	Arthur McGreer	26 years (1922–1948)
Acadia University	Nova Scotia	Artemas Wyman Sawyer	25 years (1869–1896)
Queen's University	Ontario	George Munro Grant	25 years (1877–1902)
University of Toronto	Ontario	Robert Falconer	25 years (1907–1932)
University of British Columbia	British Columbia	Leonard Klinck	25 years (1919–1944)
Acadia University	Nova Scotia	Frederic Patterson	25 years (1923–1948)
University of New Brunswick	New Brunswick	William Brydone Jack	24 years (1861–1885)
McGill University	Quebec	William Peterson	24 years (1885–1919)
McGill University	Quebec	Frank Cyril James	23 years (1939–1962)
Dalhousie University	Nova Scotia	James Ross	22 years (1863–1885)
University of Toronto	Ontario	John Strachan	21 years (1827–1848)
University of New Brunswick	New Brunswick	Thomas Harrison	21 years (1885–1906)
University of Manitoba	Manitoba	James MacLean	21 years (1913–1934)
University of Alberta	Alberta	Henry Marshall Tory	20 years (1908–1928)
Dalhousie University	Nova Scotia	Arthur Stanley McKenzie	20 years (1911–1931)
Western University	Ontario	William Sherwood Fox	20 years (1927–1947)
Western University	Ontario	George Hall	20 years (1947–1967)

== See also ==
- Lists of university leaders
- List of universities in Canada
