= Charles McDonald =

Charles McDonald may refer to:

- Charles James McDonald (1793–1860), politician and jurist from the U.S. state of Georgia
- Charles McDonald (Australian politician) (1860–1925), Speaker of the Australian House of Representatives
- Charles McDonald (Canadian politician) (1867–1936), Saskatchewan MLA and later MP and Senator in the Canadian House of Commons
- Charles McDonald (footballer) (1901–1978), Australian rules footballer for South Melbourne
- Charles McDonald (Irish politician) (born 1935), Irish Fine Gael Senator, TD and MEP
- Charles McDonald (Louisiana politician) (born 1938), member of the Louisiana House of Representatives, 1991–2008
- Charles C. McDonald (1933–2017), general in the United States Air Force
- Charles George McDonald (1892–1970), Australian academic
- Charles Daniel McDonald (born 1976), Scottish fashion journalist and digital media entrepreneur
- Charlie McDonald (bobsleigh) (1932–1984), American Olympic bobsledder
- Charlie McDonald (rugby union)

== See also ==
- Charles MacDonald (disambiguation)
