= Sir Howard Douglas Hall =

Coordinates: 45°56′53.93″N 66°38′28.65″W

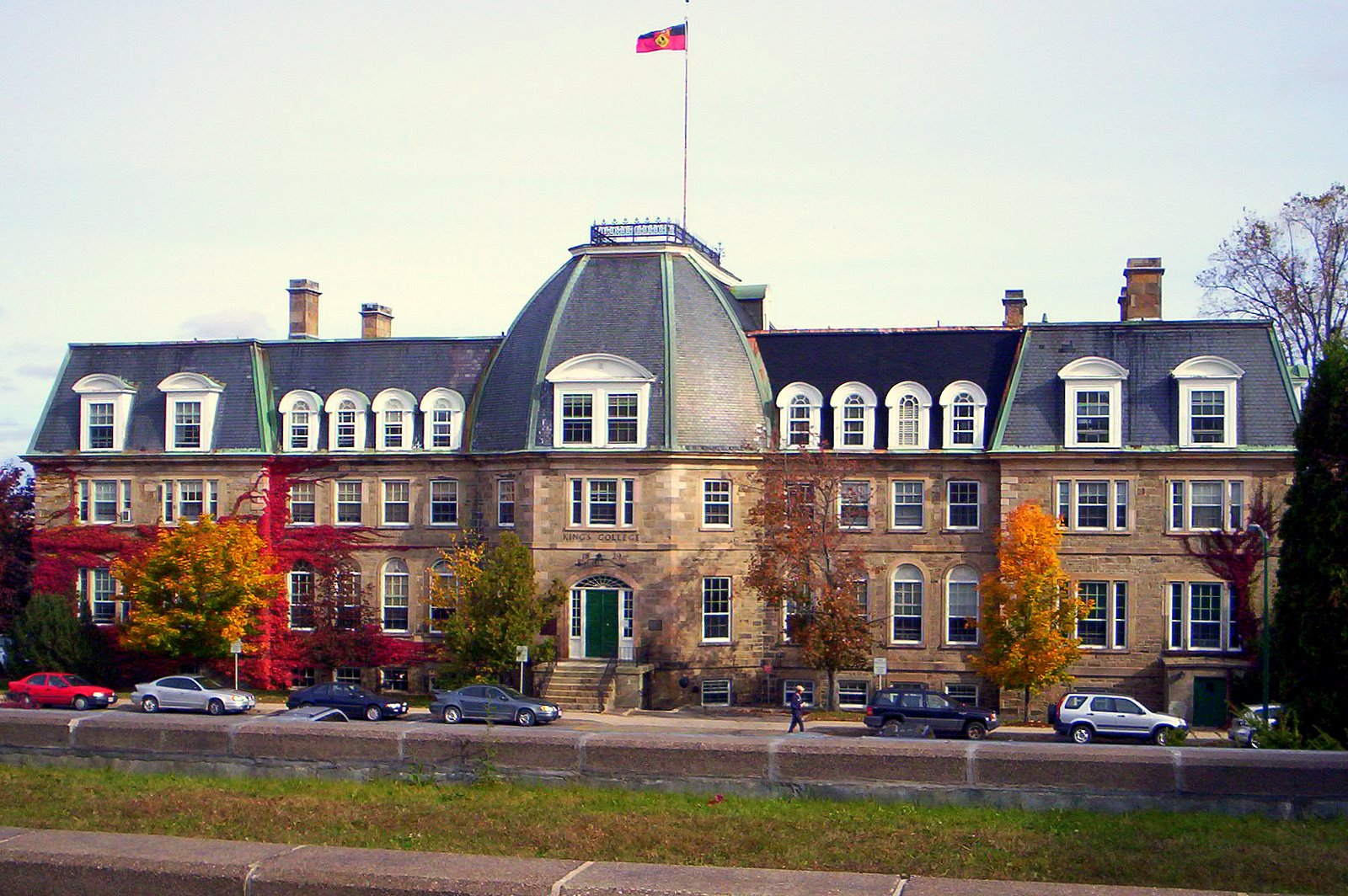
- Established: 1827
- Location: Fredericton, New Brunswick, Canada
- Type: University Museum
- Website: www.unb.ca/president/oldart.html

National Historic Site of Canada
- Official name: Arts Building National Historic Site of Canada
- Designated: 1951

Sir Howard Douglas Hall, commonly referred to as "The Old Arts Building", is the oldest university building still in use in Canada, completed in 1827. The building is named after Howard Douglas and is located on the Fredericton campus of the University of New Brunswick. The lobby of the building resembles a small museum due to the historic documents and other artifacts stored there. The Edwin Jacob chapel is also located in the lobby. The 'Great Hallways' of this building are filled with history as they are lined with portraits of past presidents of the university. It was designed by the same architect, John Elliott Woolford, that designed Old Government House, also in Fredericton, in 1826. The third story and mansard roof was added in 1876.

The building was designated a National Historic Site of Canada in 1951.

== Affiliations ==
The Museum is affiliated with: CMA, CHIN, and Virtual Museum of Canada.
