= Elizabeth Laird =

Elizabeth Laird may refer to:

- Elizabeth Laird (author) (born 1943), British writer of children's books
- Elizabeth Laird (physicist) (1874–1969), Canadian physicist
