= Charles MacDonald =

Charles MacDonald may refer to:

- Charles Macdonald (professor) (1828–1901), Scottish-Canadian mathematician and educator
- Charles James MacDonald (1831–1903), lawyer and political figure in Nova Scotia, Canada
- Charles Blair Macdonald (1855–1939), American golfer
- Charles H. MacDonald (1914–2002), U.S. flying ace of World War II
- Charles B. MacDonald (1922–1990), military historian
- Charlie MacDonald (born 1981), English footballer
- Charlie MacDonald (politician), Canadian politician and businessman
- C. Leslie Macdonald (1856–1929), Australian racehorse owner and breeder
- Charles Macdonald, Nova Scotia artist and architect who built the Charles Macdonald Concrete House Museum

== See also ==
- Charles McDonald (disambiguation)
