= George Munro (philanthropist) =

Canadian philanthropist (1825–1896)

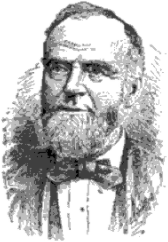
- Born: November 12, 1825; West River, Nova Scotia, Canada
- Died: April 23, 1896 (aged 70); Pine Hill, New York, U.S.
- Education: Pictou Academy
- Occupation: Publisher
- Known for: Seaside Library; Philanthropy to Dalhousie University
- Spouses: Rachael Warren (m. 1855; died 1863); Catherine Forrest (m. 1864)
- Children: 4
- Relatives: John Forrest (brother-in-law); Jacob Gould Schurman (son-in-law); William Duff Forrest (nephew)

George Munro (November 12, 1825 – April 23, 1896) was a Canadian dime novel publisher and philanthropist, best known for his financial support for Dalhousie University.

Born in Nova Scotia, Munro moved to New York City in 1856 to pursue a career in publishing. In 1877, he found commercial success in the Seaside Library, a low-cost journal that reprinted novels. Munro donated $500,000 to Dalhousie University over the course of his life, supporting professorships and scholarships and saving the university from closure.

== Early life and education ==
Munro was born in West River, Nova Scotia, on November 12, 1825. He was the fourth of ten or twelve children, to parents John Munro and Mary Mathieson.

Aged 12, Munro became an apprentice at a local newspaper known as The Observer. He left to continue his education in New Glasgow from 1839 to 1842, thereafter becoming a teacher. In 1844, Munro enrolled at the Pictou Academy.

== Career ==
=== Teaching ===
Following the completion of his studies at the Pictou Academy in 1847, Munro returned to New Glasgow to teach at his former school.

In 1850, Munro moved to Halifax, where he taught natural philosophy and mathematics at the Free Church Academy. He was appointed as Rector two years later. He completed a course in theology, and intended to enter ordained ministry. According to one rumour, Munro "preached one sermon and made a solemn vow never to renew the ordeal".

=== Publishing industry ===
In October 1856, Munro moved to New York City. He first worked for D. Appleton & Company, where he was involved in mail order and distribution for British magazines and books. In 1862, he moved to Ross and Tousey, which would become the American News Company. At this time, Munro began to grow interested in publishing dime novels: reprints of popular works in cheap journals.

Between 1863 and 1866, Munro worked for Beadle and Company. He entered a brief partnership with Irwin Beadle, brother of Erastus Flavel Beadle, a pioneer of pulp fiction; Munro became the company's sole owner a year later.

In 1867, Munro began to publish the Fireside Companion, his own weekly story-paper. This was his first notable success, with readers and contributors in Nova Scotia.

=== Seaside Library ===
In May 1877, Munro began publishing the Seaside Library, a low-cost weekly journal reprinting novels, beginning with East Lynne by Henry Wood. The name imitated Lakeside Library, a rival journal published by R.R. Donnelley; Munro would later buy the publication.

In time, Seaside Library expanded to include history, biography, travel, and religious works. It was popular, with up to eighteen numbers weekly, totalling over 3,000 numbers over the course of the journal's life. In 1881, the Seaside Library published its thousandth number: the Revised New Testament, with Constantin von Tischendorf's introduction.

Seaside Library is credited for improving the accessibility and affordability of literature in the United States. Like his contemporaries publishing before the advent of international copyright laws, Munro did not pay royalties to authors he republished. Munro invested his wealth from the publication in a large printing plant and New York real estate.

== Philanthropy ==
In 1879, Munro made a substantial donation to Dalhousie University. His brother-in-law, John Forrest, was a member of the Board of Governors, while Munro's son, George William, had studied there between 1874 and 1878. Munro had been staying with Forrest at Forrest's residence in Brunswick Street, Halifax, during a long summer break, and proposed to fund a chair in Physics if the university could find a suitable appointment. At the time of Munro's donation, Dalhousie University's annual income was only $6,600, and there was significant discussion about the possibility of its closure. The university had only began to operate continuously in 1863.

Munro's first endowed chair was the chair of Physics, which was awarded to James Gordon MacGregor. In 1880, he funded a chair of history and political economy, on the condition that it would be awarded to Forrest, who would become the university's third president in 1885. Further chairs followed in English literature and philosophy in 1882 (for which he nominated his future son-in-law, Jacob Gould Schurman), constitutional and international law in 1883 (for which he nominated Richard Chapman Weldon and inaugurated the Dalhousie Law School), and English in 1884. The salaries attached to these chairs, ranging from $2,000 to $2,500, were twice those of regional professionals.

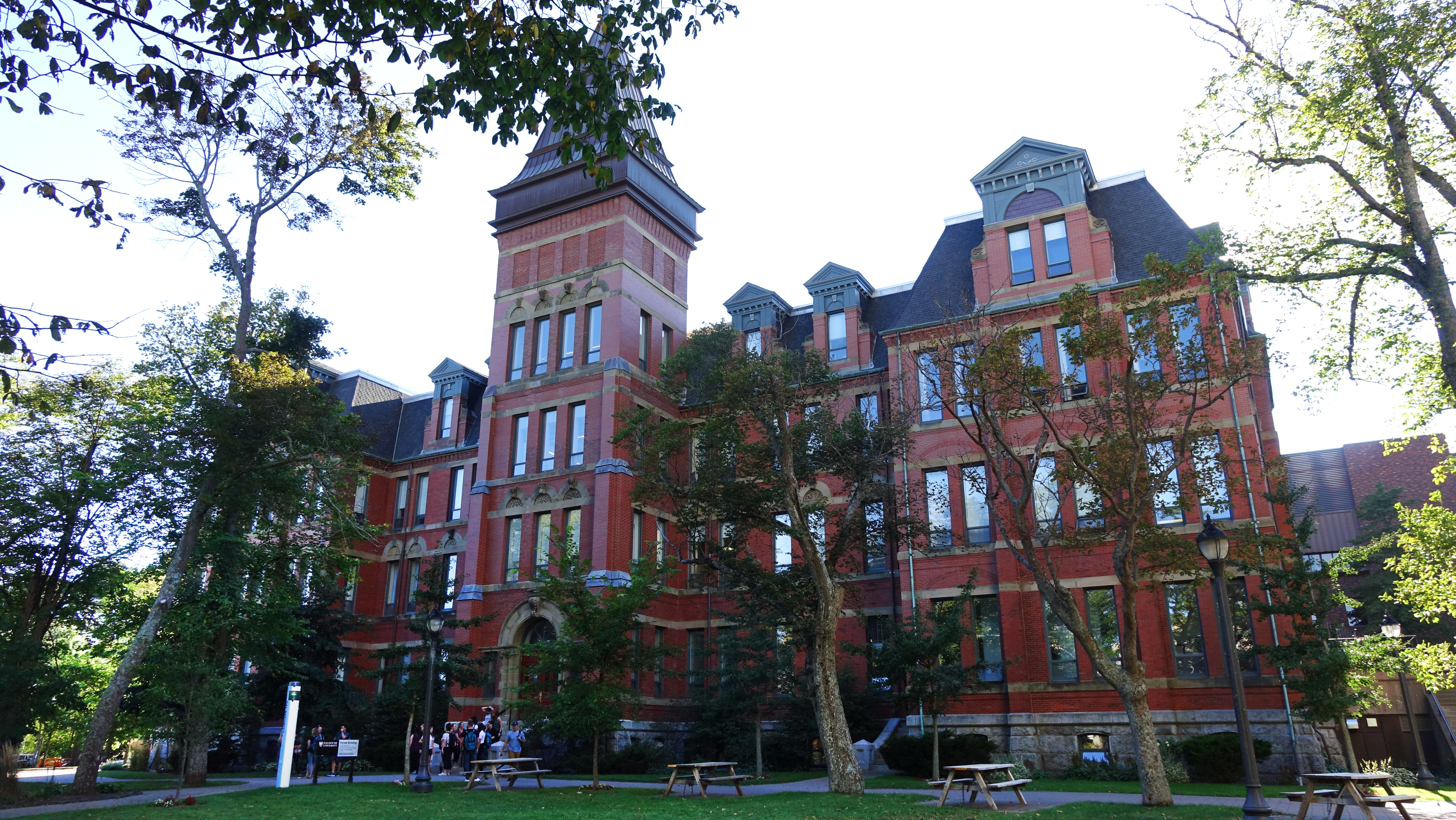
During the era of Munro's donations, in autumn 1887, under Forrest's presidency, Dalhousie University moved from the site of the present-day Halifax City Hall to what was then the city's western suburbs. The Forrest Building is photographed here in October 2018.

Munro also supported tutorships and scholarships at Dalhousie University across a range of subjects. Munro's second son, John, matriculated at Dalhousie University in 1885; by then, his father was supporting a third of the university's faculty members and students. Munro supported its first two female students, who matriculated at Dalhousie in 1881, and more than half of the university's first 25 female graduates.

At the time of his death in 1896, Munro's annual donations to Dalhousie University amounted to $25,000. He had donated a total of $500,000 over the course of his life (about $8 million in 1999). Though Munro did not bequeath money to Dalhousie University in his will, the Board of Governors made a claim against his estate for promissory notes that secured an additional $82,000 to the George Munro Trust Fund, which had been established in 1893 to manage his donations.

Munro was also a benefactor of the City University of New York, where he was a member of the Board of Governors, to Halifax's Citizens' Free Library, to the reading-room of the Amalgamated Trades Union, and to his church: he was a "liberal-minded Presbyterian".

== Personal life ==
He married his first wife, Rachel Warren (1825-1863) in 1855. They had two daughters who both died young: M. Florence (1856–1857) and Emily E. (1858–1859). They also had at least one son, George William (1860–1923).

In 1864, he married second to Catherine Forrest (1835–1912). They had two sons and two daughters.

== Death ==
Munro died from heart failure in Pine Hill, New York, on April 23, 1896, while attending repairs at his country home in the Catskills.

== Munro Day ==
In 1881, students at Dalhousie University asked that the third Wednesday in January be a designated holiday for George Munro. The holiday, then named George Munro Memorial Day, later moved to the first Friday in February, when 'Munro Day' is still celebrated today. It became tradition for students to sleigh-ride along the Bedford Basin on the holiday, followed by a fancy dinner; winter sports are still associated with the day. Over the course of the university's history, other activities associated with Munro Day included varsity games, musical performances, and ice skating.

== See also ==
- Izaak Walton Killam
