= Kim Brooks =

Canadian professor

Kim Brooks CM

13th President of Dalhousie University
- Incumbent
- Assumed office August 14, 2023
- Chancellor: Rustum Southwell
- Preceded by: Deep Saini

Personal details
- Education: University of Toronto (BA); University of British Columbia (LLB); York University (LLM); University of Western Australia (PhD)

Kim Ruth Brooks is a university professor and administrator who currently serves as the President and vice-chancellor of Dalhousie University. She was previously the university's acting Provost and Vice-President Academic, as well as the Dean of the Faculty of Management at the university. Prior to this she served as the Dean of the university's Schulich School of Law and as the endowed H. Heward Stikeman Chair in Law of Taxation at the McGill University Faculty of Law.

== Education ==
Kim Brooks received her BA from the University of Toronto, an LLB the University of British Columbia, LLM from Osgoode Hall Law School at York University. In between her law degree and LLM, she worked as a tax lawyer with the firm Stikeman Elliott. Later in her career, she earned a PhD from the University of Western Australia.

== Academic career ==
=== Professor and Dean ===
Kim Brooks began her career as a law professor at Queen's University and the University of British Columbia. She then became a professor of law at McGill University, where she was a recipient of the 3M Teaching Fellowship. At McGill she was appointed to the H. Heward Stikeman Chair in Law of Taxation. Her research focus was on tax law, before Brooks moved to Dalhousie University to serve as the Dean of the Schulich School of Law, before becoming Dean of the Dalhousie University's Faculty of Management.

=== President of Dalhousie and faculty lockout ===
On January 1, 2023 Brooks became the acting Provost and Vice-President Academic of Dalhousie University, and on August 14, 2023, she became the President of Dalhousie University. She is the first woman and openly-queer person to hold the position at Dalhousie. In 2024, Brooks wore a presidential convocation gown, the design of which was overseen by faculty staff and produced by an undergraduate Costume department student, using indigenous imagery. As the project was a part of the student's Honours thesis, it was not announced if the student was compensated for the design, or if she instead paid herself to do it through her tuition fees.

In August 2025, under her leadership, Dalhousie became the first U15 Canada university to order the lockout of their teaching faculty, doing so just before the new school year began and before the union membership could complete its vote on the university's contract offer. In response, the Quebec Federation of Professors, which previously represented Brooks when she taught as a professor at McGill, called her refusal to bargain for a new contract an “authoritarian move”. As the lockout entered its fourth week, Dalhousie students circulated a petition pushing for Brooks' resignation from the presidency and "accusing the university of damaging its reputation, disrespecting faculty, and undermining student learning." The petition was eventually signed by more than one thousand people. After the lockout ended, the student union demanded 21% of their semester's tuition refunded, as this was the amount of classes not taught due to Brooks' lockout in a statement that also read, "This disruption has deprived us of the education we are paying for, leaving us with cancelled classes, lost instructional time, gaps in invaluable mentorship and mounting uncertainty about our academic futures." Her eventual offer to the professors ended up being nearly twice her initial financial offer, which she had originally claimed was all she could afford.

=== Other work ===
Brooks has also served as co-chair of the National Association of Women and the Law, the Chair of the Women's Legal Education and Action Fund, and the managing editor of the Canadian Journal of Women and the Law. She is also a past-President of the Canadian Association of Law Teachers.

== Government work ==
In 2016 Brooks was brought in by the Revenue Minister of the Government of Canada to act as an independent reviewer of accused tax malfeasance of KPMG advisors and the handling of the file by the Canada Revenue Agency. Following her review, she was appointed as the vice chair of the agency's offshore advisory committee.

== Honours ==
She was made a Member of the Order of Canada on December 31, 2025.
