= William Duff Forrest =

Canadian politician (1874–1939)

Member of the Nova Scotia Legislative Assembly for Halifax Centre
- In office 1937–1939

Chairman of the Nova Scotia board of Health
- In office 1925 – 1929, again from 1930-1937

Personal details
- Born: June 2, 1874 Halifax, Nova Scotia
- Died: September 12, 1939 (aged 65) Halifax, Nova Scotia

William Duff Forrest (June 2, 1874 – September 12, 1939) was a physician and political figure in Nova Scotia, Canada. He represented Halifax Centre in the Nova Scotia House of Assembly from 1937 to 1939 as a Liberal member.

He was born in Halifax, the son of the Reverend John Forrest and Annie Prescott Duff. Forrest was educated at Dalhousie University and continued his studies in medicine in London and Edinburgh. In 1906, he married J. Frances Thomas. Forrest was chairman of the Halifax Board of Health from 1925 to 1929 and from 1930 to 1937. He died in office in Halifax at the age of 65.
