= Arthur Stanley Mackenzie =

Canadian physicist

- Born: September 20, 1865; Pictou, Nova Scotia
- Died: October 2, 1938 (aged 73)
- Education: Dalhousie University, Johns Hopkins University
- Known for: President of Dalhousie University
- Scientific career
- Fields: Physics
- Workplaces: Bryn Mawr College, Dalhousie University
- Doctoral students: Elizabeth Laird (physicist)

Arthur Stanley Mackenzie (September 20, 1865 – October 2, 1938) was a Canadian physicist and university president. He was born in Pictou, Nova Scotia and educated at Dalhousie University, Halifax, and Johns Hopkins University.

He was instructor in mathematics at Dalhousie from 1887 to 1889. At Bryn Mawr College, Pennsylvania, he was a lecturer and associate in physics (1891–92), associate professor (1894–97), and professor (1897–1905). Mackenzie then returned to Dalhousie to become a Munro professor of physics (1905–10). In 1911, he became president of the university, succeeding John Forrest.

Mackenzie was made a Fellow of the Royal Society of Canada in 1908 and was elected a member of the Nova Scotia Institute of Science, of the American Physical Society, and of the American Philosophical Society. His scientific papers were published in the Physical Review, Journal of the Franklin Institute, and Proceedings of the American Philosophical Society. He also translated and edited a collection of memoirs on The Laws of Gravitation (1900).

Academic offices
| Preceded by John Forrest | President of Dalhousie University; 1911 – 1931 | Succeeded by Carleton Wellesley Stanley |
