= William Brydone Jack Observatory =

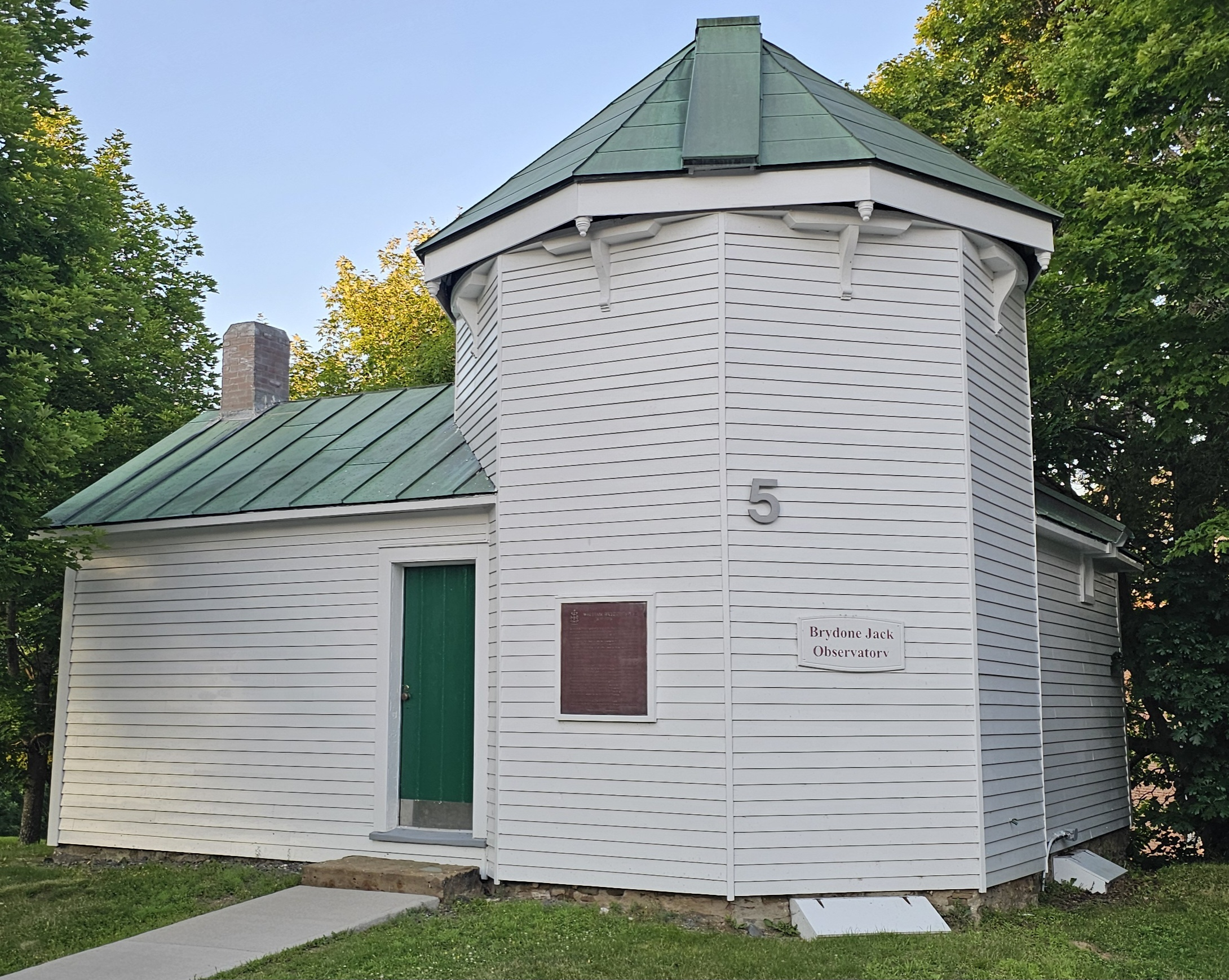
- The observatory in 2026
- Location: University of New Brunswick, Fredericton, Canada
- Coordinates: 45°56′53″N 66°38′26″W
- Established: 1851
- Related media on Commons

The William Brydone Jack Observatory is a small astronomical observatory on the campus of the University of New Brunswick in Fredericton, New Brunswick, Canada. Constructed in 1851, it was the first astronomical observatory built in British North America. The observatory was designated a National Historic Site of Canada in 1954.

== Beginnings ==
In 1840 William Brydone Jack became professor of Mathematics and Natural Philosophy at King's College, which later became the University of New Brunswick. In 1847 he and James Robb, the college's professor of Chemistry and Natural History, wrote to the College Council requesting money to purchase scientific equipment. An enthusiastic astronomer himself and supported by New Brunswick Lieutenant Governor Sir Edmund Walker Head, Brydone Jack persuaded the council to grant funds for the purchase of a telescope and other astronomy equipment. The 7.5 foot mahogany and brass achromatic telescope with an equatorial mount was built by the German manufacturer Merz and Son at a cost of £504.11s.9d. It was delivered to Fredericton in May 1849.

Having acquired the telescope, Brydone Jack had to obtain the council's consent to build a small observatory. He was again successful in persuading them to grant the required funds, and the building, which he designed himself, was completed in 1851 at a cost of £170.9s.7d. The small observatory building was covered with wooden clapboard siding. The telescope was housed in an octagonal tower, 14 feet across, with a rotating copper-clad roof. The rest of the building consisted of two small single-story gable roofed wings, each 12 feet square.

== Later history ==
In 1859 King's College became the University of New Brunswick. Brydone Jack served as the University's president from 1861 to 1885 and died in 1886. After his death the observatory ceased to be used for its original purpose, although the telescope remained in the building. In 1899 renovations were carried out and the telescope was placed on a concrete foundation. During the twentieth century the observatory building served several purposes, including an art center and a faculty club. The Fiddlehead, a literary magazine published at the University of New Brunswick, also used the building as its office.

The observatory was declared a National Historic Site in 1954, and a commemorative plaque was unveiled at a ceremony on 10 May 1955. The text on the original plaque read:

First Astronomical Observatory in Canada

Built in 1851 at the instigation of William Brydone Jack, professor of mathematics, natural philosophy and astronomy; President of the University of New Brunswick, 1861-85. Schooled in the traditions of the Scottish universities, he equipped the observatory with the best instruments of the day. In collaboration with Harvard observatory he determined the longitude of Fredericton and other places in New Brunswick and corrected errors in the international boundary.

In 1984 the building was renovated to become a museum. Brydone Jack's astronomical instruments can be seen on the ground floor, while the original 1849 telescope is housed in the building's tower.

== See also ==
- List of astronomical observatories
