= Marie-Eve Sylvestre =

31st President of the University of Ottawa
- Incumbent
- Assumed office July 1, 2025
- Preceded by: Jacques Frémont

Personal details
- Education: Université de Montréal; University of Ottawa

Marie-Eve Sylvestre is a Canadian academic administrator serving as president and vice-rector of the University of Ottawa since 2025.

== Life ==
Sylvestre completed a master's degree at the Université de Montréal. She earned a doctorate at Harvard University.

Sylvestre joined the University of Ottawa in 2005 as a professor. She became dean of the civil law section in the law faculty in 2019. She held a research chair on criminal law and policy and the regulation of marginalized people.

She served as co-chair of the university's Senate committee on academic freedom. Sylvestre started a five year term as the 31st president and vice-rector of the University of Ottawa on July 1, 2025. She succeeded Jacques Frémont and is the first woman to hold the role. In a 2026 interview, she shared her belief that universities must be socially engaged actors and that research should serve community needs and produce concrete outcomes that help citizens. Sylvestre also believes universities must exclude hate speech, racism, and discrimination when discussing academic freedom.
