= Rene Van Acker =

Canadian agricultural scientist and academic leader

Rene Van Acker is a Canadian agricultural scientist and academic leader, who is currently the 10th President and Vice‑Chancellor of the University of Guelph, having assumed the role on 2 July 2025. He has made contributions to the fields of weed science, sustainable agriculture, and academic administration.

== Early life and education ==
Van Acker was born and raised on a farm in Burford, Ontario. He earned a B.Sc. in Crop Science and an M.Sc. in Weed Science from the University of Guelph, followed by a Ph.D. in crop–weed ecology at the University of Reading in the UK.

== Career ==
Van Acker started his academic career as an assistant professor at the University of Manitoba in 1996, where he worked in the Department of Plant Science until 2006. In 2006, he moved to the University of Guelph, where he served as Chair of the Department of Plant Agriculture and, from 2009 to 2016, as Associate Dean (External) of the Ontario Agricultural College (OAC) at U of G.

In 2016, Van Acker was appointed Dean of OAC. Under his leadership, the college saw a 50% increase in undergraduate enrolment and the development of several new graduate programs. He also spearheaded the *Our Shared Priorities* strategic plan and the first infrastructure master plan in over 40 years.

In July 2023, Van Acker was appointed interim Vice‑President (Research) at U of G, and by July 2024, he was confirmed as Vice‑President (Research & Innovation). In this role, he focused on strengthening U of G's research infrastructure, advancing innovation, and expanding national and international partnerships.

On 26 June 2025, the University of Guelph Board of Governors announced that Van Acker would assume the role of President and Vice‑Chancellor on 2 July 2025, succeeding Dr. Charlotte Yates. Yates praised Van Acker's extensive institutional knowledge and leadership vision, especially regarding innovation and research.

== Research and scholarship ==
Van Acker has worker on weed management, crop–weed ecology, and sustainable agri-food systems. His work explores the ecological dynamics of weed populations, the persistence of herbicide-resistant crops, and sustainable agricultural practices. He has authored over 160 peer-reviewed publications and has an h-index of 41.

Areas of his research include:

- The persistence of glyphosate-resistant canola in Canadian cropping systems.
- The environmental and economic trade-offs in herbicide-tolerant crop systems.
- The role of agricultural biodiversity in enhancing ecosystem services.

Van Acker has been supported by the Natural Sciences and Engineering Research Council of Canada (NSERC), Agriculture and Agri-Food Canada (AAFC), and Canadian Organic Growers. His research has been cited in agronomy and environmental science literature, especially in the areas of weed resistance and integrated pest management.

== Leadership and service ==
Van Acker has co-founded several major research initiatives at U of G, including the Arrell Food Institute, Guelph Turfgrass Institute, and the Bioproducts Discovery & Development Centre. He is also involved with the Guelph Food Innovation Centre, Dairy@Guelph, and the Honey Bee Research Centre.

In addition to his work at U of G, Van Acker serves in leadership roles with external organizations, including the Rural Ontario Institute and the Ontario Institute of Agrologists. He is currently President‑Elect of the Deans Council for Agriculture, Food and Veterinary Medicine.

== Selected publications ==
- Acker, Rene C. Van; Swanton, Clarence J.; Weise, Stephan F. (June 1993). "The Critical Period of Weed Control in Soybean [Glycine max (L.) Merr.]". Weed Science. 41 (2): 194–200. Bibcode:1993WeedS..41..194V. doi:10.1017/S0043174500076050. ISSN 0043-1745.
- Harker, K. N.; Clayton, G. W.; Blackshaw, R. E.; O'Donovan, J. T.; Johnson, E. N.; Gan, Y.; Holm, F. A.; Sapsford, K. L.; Irvine, R. B.; Van Acker, R. C. (2006). "Persistence of Glyphosate-Resistant Canola in Western Canadian Cropping Systems". Agronomy Journal. 98 (1): 107–119. Bibcode:2006AgrJ...98..107H. doi:10.2134/agronj2005.0168. ISSN 1435-0645.
- Turner, Fawn A.; Acker, Rene C. Van (March 2014). "Fertilizer Application Has No Effect on Large (Digitaria sanguinalis) or Smooth (Digitaria ischaemum) Crabgrass Germination and Emergence in Residential Turfgrass in a Northern Climate". Weed Science. 62 (1): 145–157. Bibcode:2014WeedS..62..145T. doi:10.1614/WS-D-13-00068.1. ISSN 0043-1745.
