= John Forrest (Canadian clergyman) =

Canadian clergyman and professor

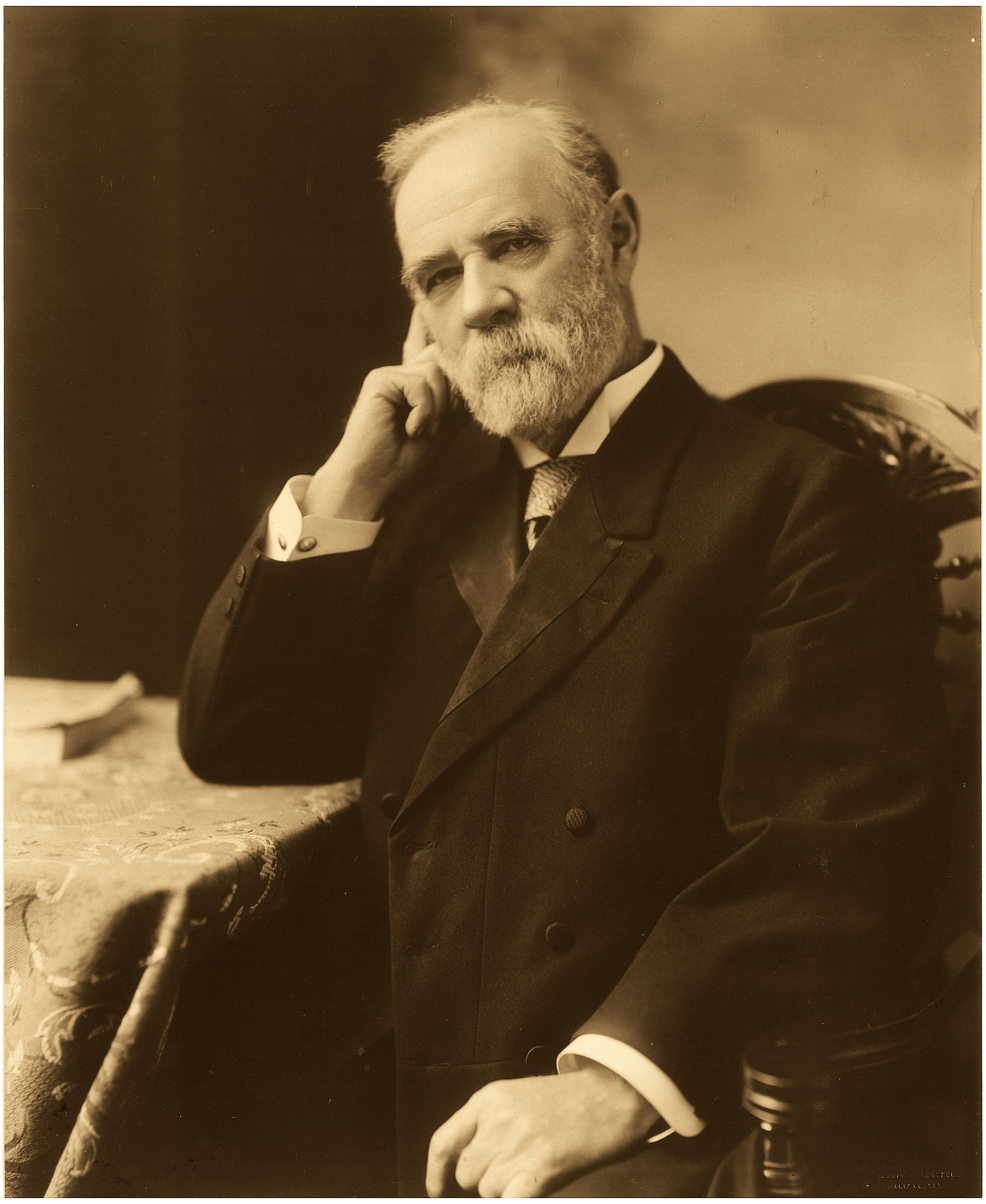
- Forrest in 1910

President of Dalhousie University
- In office 1885–1910
- Preceded by: James Ross
- Succeeded by: Arthur Stanley Mackenzie

Personal details
- Born: November 25, 1842 New Glasgow, Nova Scotia, Canada
- Died: June 23, 1920 (aged 77) Halifax, Nova Scotia, Canada
- Spouse: Annie Prescott Duff (m. 1871)
- Relations: George Munro (brother-in-law)
- Children: 5, including William Duff Forrest
- Education: Queen's University; Free Church College

John Forrest (November 25, 1842 – June 23, 1920) was a Canadian Presbyterian minister and educator in Nova Scotia. He served as President of Dalhousie University from 1885 to 1910, during which time he oversaw the university's expansion with new departments and the Studley Campus.

== Early life and ministry ==
Forrest was born in New Glasgow, Nova Scotia, on November 25, 1842. He was the son of Alexander Forrest, who had emigrated from Lanarkshire, Scotland, in 1832, and Barbara Ross McKenzie. He had two sisters, Isabella and Catherine.

Forrest was educated at the Presbyterian College in Truro, the Queen's University in Kingston, and the Free Church College in Halifax. He was ordained in the Presbyterian Church in 1866, and became a minister at St John's Church in Halifax.

== Dalhousie University ==
=== Governor and Professor ===
In 1878, Forrest was invited to become the representative for the Presbyterian Church on the Board of Governors for Dalhousie University. As governor, Forrest advocated for a gymnasium to improve students' wellbeing; he personally subsidised its construction in the old brewery between 1882 and 1885. He supported the admission of female students when the question was considered by the Board of Governors in July 1881. Forrest encouraged the founding of the Dalhousie Athletic Club in 1884, and was its honorary president.

During the summer of 1879, while the university faced imminent closure, his brother-in-law through Catherine, the dime novel publisher George Munro, lived with Forrest at Forrest's residence in Brunswick Street. Explaining the university's financial situation, Munro promised to endow a chair in physics if Forrest could find a suitable appointment, beginning Munro's extensive philanthropic association with the university; the chair would be awarded to James Gordon MacGregor.

In October 1880, Munro promised to endow a second chair, in history and political economy, at a salary of $2,500, on the condition that it be awarded to Forrest. Forrest duly resigned his position at St John's Church, and was inaugurated as the George Munro Professor of History on March 15, 1881.

=== President ===
In 1885, Forrest succeeded James Ross as the third Principal of Dalhousie University upon Ross' retirement; Forrest preferred to use the term 'President'.

In autumn 1887, Forrest oversaw the university's relocation to what was then Halifax's western suburbs; it was previously in the city centre, at the site now occupied by Halifax City Hall. Forrest's administration opened new faculties, including the Halifax Medical College (1887) and the Maritime Dental College (1908). He opened a Faculty of Engineering in 1905, but it was ceded to the provincial government to found the Nova Scotia Technical College in 1907, which would merge into Dalhousie University in 1997. In 1910, the university purchased the 43 acres (170,000 m^{2}) Studley Estate from the heirs of Robert Murray, which would become the Studley Campus. Forrest was receptive to the possibility of a merger with the University of King's College.

Forrest acted as the university's bursar and registrar, and personally collected students' fees. Students called him 'Lord John', and he was distinguished for his memory of faces and names, as memorialised in one student's poem:

Fine me again, Lord John, fine me again.
Please soak me for sups and swat me for ten.
But grasp my hand firmly, say it out loud:
“Of course I know you, you’re Donald MacLeod.”

Forrest retired as President of Dalhousie University in 1911, and was succeeded by Arthur Stanley Mackenzie.

== Other interests ==
Forrest served as President of the Royal Nova Scotia Historical Society from 1905 to 1906 and as Moderator for the Presbyterian Church in Canada in 1910. He held honorary degrees from the universities of New Brunswick (1890), King's College (1890), St Francis Xavier (1905), and Dalhousie (1916).

== Death and legacy ==
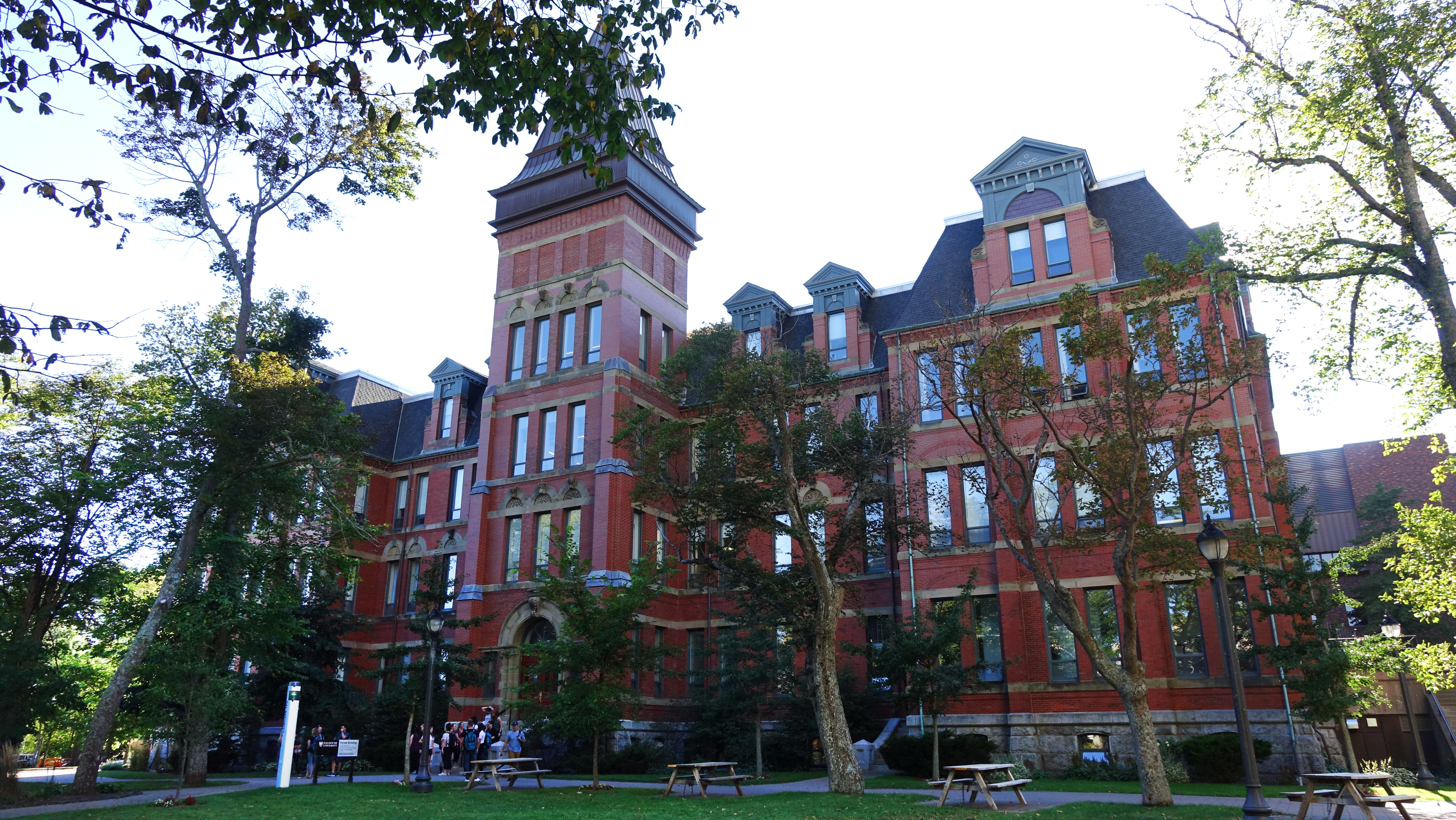
The Forrest Building in October 2018

Forrest died in Halifax on June 23, 1920. He had married Annie Prescott Duff on December 20, 1871, in Lunenburg, and had five children, including William Duff Forrest, who served as a Liberal member of the Nova Scotia House of Assembly.

A tablet in Halifax's Fort Massey United Church remembers Forrest. The building to which the university relocated in 1887 was named the Forrest Building in 1919. It was the university's only building until 1914; as of 2023, the building houses the Schools of Nursing, Physiotherapy, and Occupational Therapy.
