= William Brydone Jack =

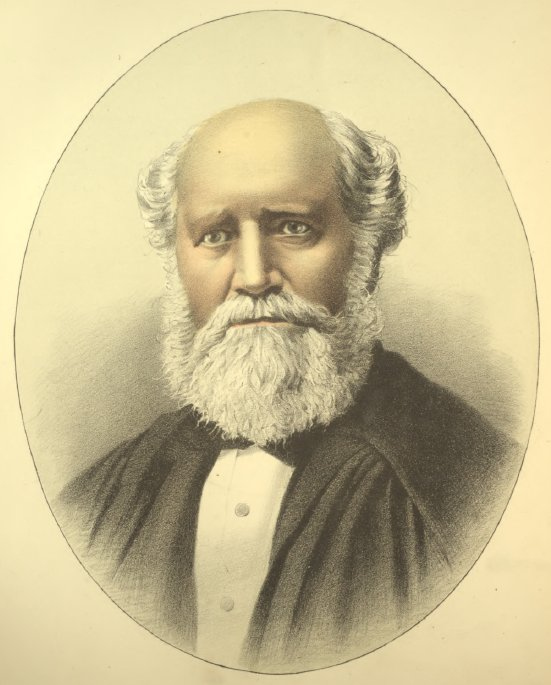
William Brydone Jack

William Brydone Jack (23 November 1817 – 23 November 1886) was the University of New Brunswick's first surveying professor and its second president (1861–1885). He was educated at the University of St Andrews, Scotland. In 1840, he was appointed Professor of Mathematics and Natural Philosophy at what was then King's College (founded in 1785) and gave lectures in surveying as part of the mathematics curriculum. William Brydone Jack also designed a small wooden observatory which became operational in 1851.

William Brydone Jack was born on 23 November 1817 at Trailflatt in Tinwald, Dumfries and Galloway, Scotland.

In 1855, William Brydone Jack, together with Dr. J.B. Toldervy, determined the longitude of Fredericton using the exchange of telegraph signals with Harvard College Observatory. This was the first precisely determined longitude in Canada.

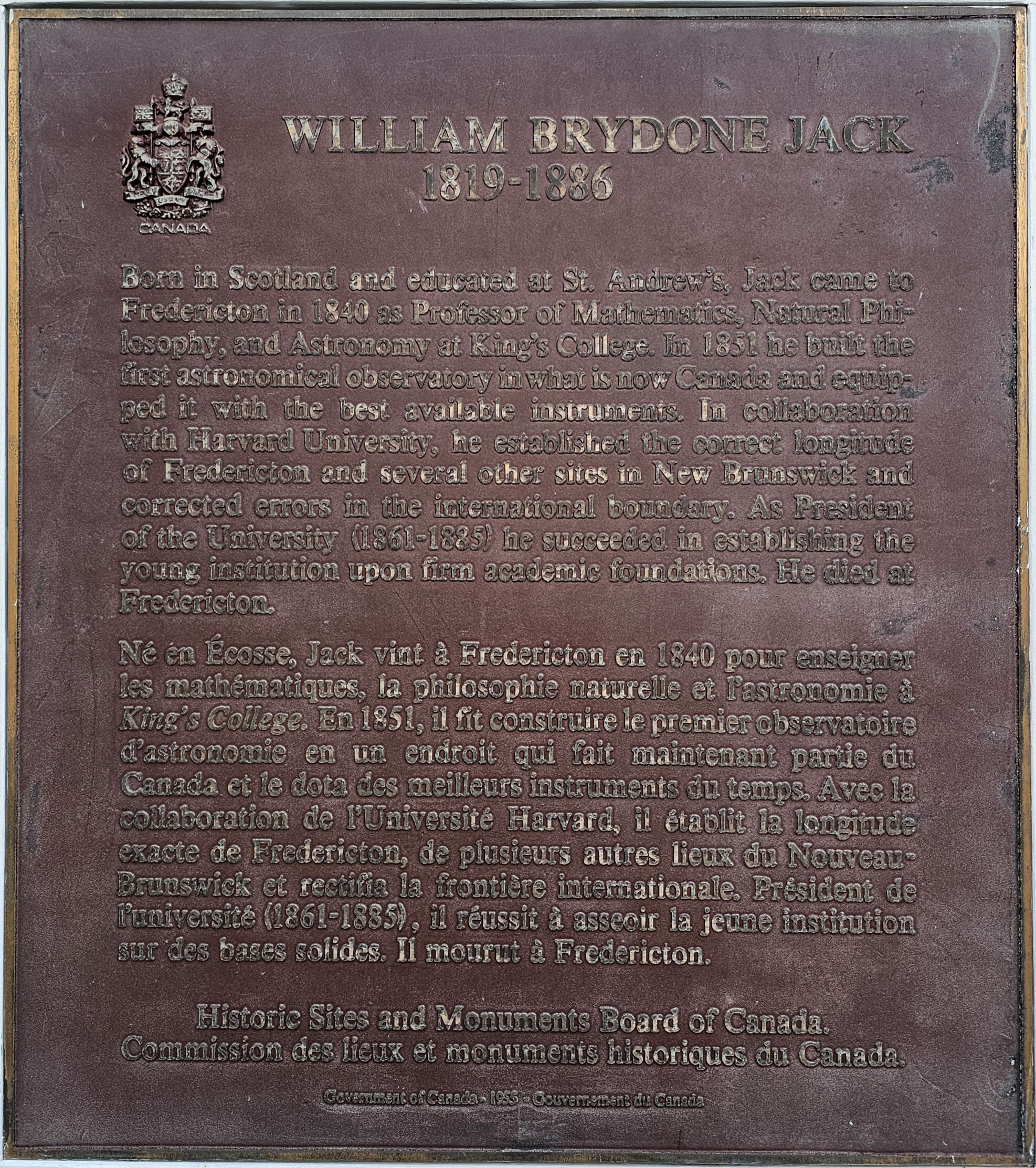
A plaque affixed to the William Brydone Jack Observatory in Fredericton

In 1859, the same year that the University of New Brunswick was created, a special three-term undergraduate course in civil engineering and surveying was initiated. The first diploma in this special course was awarded to Henry George Clopper Ketchum in June 1862. William Brydone Jack was appointed to the Board of Examiners in 1874 for the examination of candidates for admission to practice land surveying in New Brunswick.

J.E. Kennedy, professor of physics at UNB from 1945 to 1956, wrote extensively on William Brydone Jack's accomplishments in astronomy and land surveying including his efforts to build the observatory and the determination of longitude by electric telegraph.

Minor planet 79117 Brydonejack is named in his honor.
