= Charles Daniel McDonald =

Scottish fashion journalist and digital media entrepreneur (born 1976)

- Born: Charles Daniel McDonald; 23 April 1976 (age 50); Greenock, Renfrewshire, Scotland
- Occupations: fashion journalist, radio presenter, magazine editor-in-chief, entrepreneur, model
- Years active: 1995–present
- Website: Official website

Charles Daniel McDonald (born 23 April 1976) is a Scottish fashion journalist and digital media entrepreneur.

McDonald was born in Greenock, Renfrewshire, Scotland. He initially worked across Scotland as a fashion model to supplement his studies for his master's of science degree/post-graduate diploma/post-graduate certification in design engineering with sustainability at Strathclyde University, Glasgow, Scotland, graduating in 2001. Instead of heading into a career commensurate with his studies he pursued fashion as a model, fashion journalist, and blogger.

He received notoriety from the fashion industry through his roles as editor-in-chief of FORÇ Fashion Magazine and Fashion FORÇ radio show which is currently broadcast on City FM Malaga 106.2 FM alongside "Charles Does Fashion" on Barcelona City FM 107.3 FM and ´FashionFORÇ´ on World Radio Paris & BBC World Service DAB 202 MHz.

In addition, he writes as international luxury editor for the affluent lifestyle magazine, Alhan He is also an author and critic, writing about fashion and style where he has worked alongside design houses such as Alexander McQueen, Balenciaga and Christian Dior.

McDonald is also managing director of the Episode Fashion Management Group, a fashion, communications and marketing company with headquarters in Paris which represents photographer Rory Lewis, artist Lisa Keenan, and cosmetic surgeon Dr. Ashish Dutta. He is currently the controlling trustee of Proyecto Amistad, a fashion charity which provides clothing and social welfare for homeless citizens. McDonald also acts as the international tourism ambassador for the Swiss City of Lausanne.

McDonald is also represented by Citizen Model Agency in Barcelona. He is a collaborator with producer and creative director Craig Wilde, working with his UK-based holistic creative agency Niltoni 360°, on his work with the stars of Channel 4's "Britain's Benefit Tenants", Andrew Dyke and Alan Lee Ogden, "The Property Boyz". Although his main residence is in Ibiza, he also spends his time in Barcelona and Paris, with homes and offices in each city.
