= Charles Macdonald (professor) =

Scottish-Canadian mathematician and educator

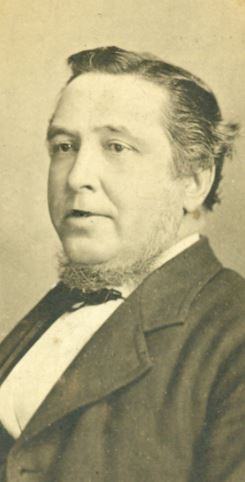
Charles Macdonald, Mathematics Professor of Dalhousie University. Photo by Notman.

Charles Macdonald (19 July 1828 – 11 March 1901) was a Scottish-Canadian mathematician and educator. Born in Aberdeen, Scotland, Macdonald studied at King's College, Aberdeen, earning degrees in the arts and divinity. The Church of Scotland named Macdonald the chair in mathematics at Dalhousie College in Halifax, Nova Scotia, which he held until his death in 1901. He was an advocate for education reform in Nova Scotia, and was a significant presence for Dalhousie in Halifax. Dalhousie's first library, Macdonald Memorial Library, was named in his honour by former students who raised money to build it.

== Early life and education ==
MacDonald attended King's College, Aberdeen and studied arts and divinity. In 1850 he was awarded the Hutton Prize, which was reserved for the student who had performed best in the arts curriculum. He earned a Master of Arts, and then studied divinity, earning a licentiate in the Church of Scotland.

== Career ==
After earning his licentiate, MacDonald became an educator. He was teaching at Aberdeen Grammar School when in 1863 he was named by the Church of Scotland to hold the chair of mathematics at Dalhousie College in Halifax, Nova Scotia. During his first lecture at Dalhousie, Macdonald criticized the existing system in Nova Scotia of different colleges run by Christian denominations, and called for a unified university for Nova Scotia. Macdonald's speech sparked a debate in Nova Scotia in the 1870s about education reform, and was cited in the 1920s as Nova Scotia began a new education reform process.

Macdonald was considered the most popular member of the faculty at the time. He was the strictest professor with the students, but was known for his wit. He was a frequent public speaker in Halifax, and he increased the presence of Dalhousie in what was fundamentally at the time a garrison town.

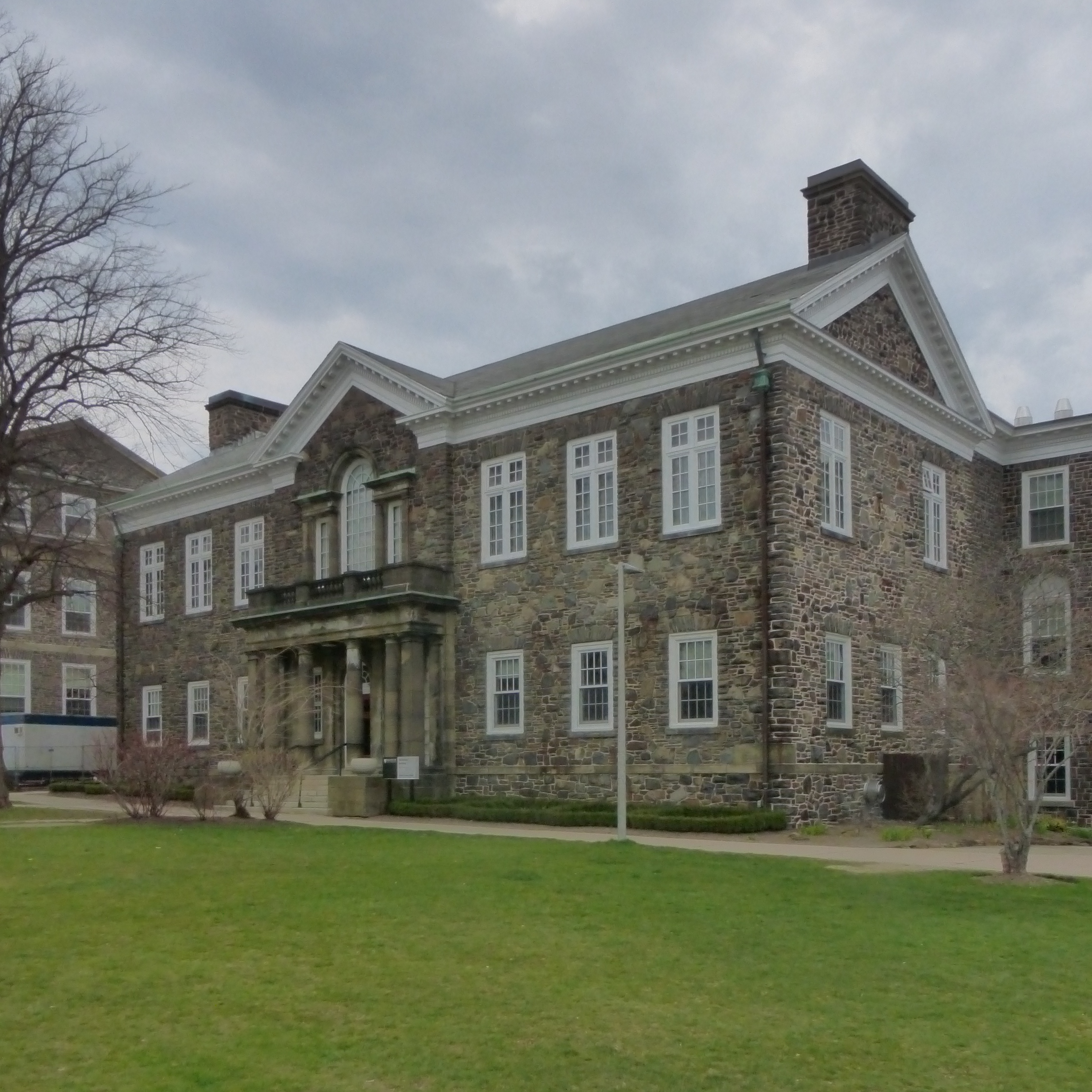
The Macdonald Building commemorates Professor MacDonald

== Personal life ==
Macdonald married Maryanne Stairs in 1882 in Halifax. She died in 1883 during childbirth, and Macdonald lived alone with their son, not remarrying.

== Death and legacy ==
Macdonald caught a cold and died of pneumonia on 11 March 1901. He was still teaching five days before his death. Macdonald left Dalhousie $2,000 to buy books for its library. Following his gift, alumni who had been his students raised funds to build a library at the university to honour him, and in 1914 the cornerstone for Macdonald Memorial Library was laid. It would serve as the primary library for Dalhousie until the 1970s.
