= Elizabeth Laird (physicist) =

Canadian physicist

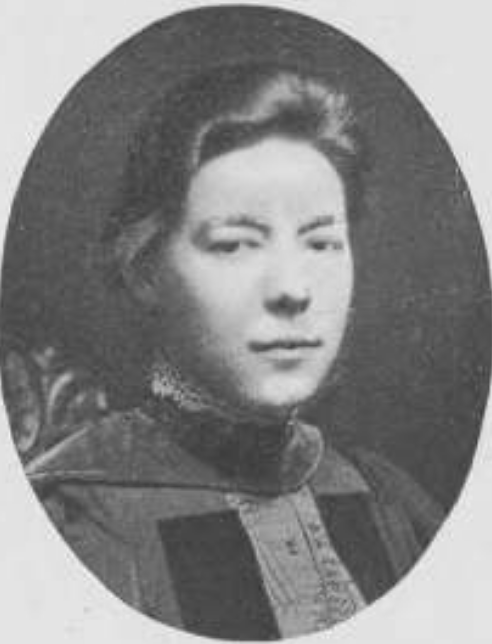
- Elizabeth Rebecca Laird, from the 1910 Mount Holyoke College yearbook
- Born: December 6, 1874; Owen Sound, Ontario
- Died: March 3, 1969 (aged 94); London, Ontario
- Education: University of Toronto, Bryn Mawr College
- Scientific career
- Fields: Physics
- Workplaces: Mount Holyoke College, Cavendish Laboratory
- Thesis: The absorption spectrum of chlorine (1901)
- Doctoral advisor: Arthur Stanley Mackenzie

Elizabeth Rebecca Laird (December 6, 1874 – March 3, 1969) was a Canadian physicist who chaired the physics department at Mount Holyoke College for nearly four decades. She was the first woman accepted by Sir J. J. Thomson to conduct research at Cambridge University's Cavendish Laboratory. In her later life she studied electromagnetic radiation for military and medical applications.

Asteroid (16192) Laird is named in her honour.

== Biography ==
=== Early life and education ===
Elizabeth Laird was born on December 6, 1874, in Owen Sound, Ontario. Her mother was Rebecca Laird and her father was Reverend John Laird, a Methodist minister.

In 1893 Laird graduated from the London Collegiate Institute, and went on to study at the University College of the University of Toronto after she was denied an exhibition scholarship due to her gender that would have allowed her to study abroad. She earned her Bachelor of Arts degree in mathematics and physics in 1896 and received the university's gold medal. Although she wanted to immediately begin graduate study at the University of Toronto, her scholarship applications were denied because of her gender. Instead, after graduation she taught for a year at Ontario Ladies' College before receiving a postgraduate fellowship in physics from Bryn Mawr College in 1898. She studied at the Humboldt University of Berlin from 1898 to 1899, working with Max Planck and under Emil Warburg on time lag in magnetization. During her time there, she became the first person to use a Nernst lamp for a physics project. Laird earned her Ph.D. in physics and mathematics from Bryn Mawr College in 1901 for her spectroscopy and magnetism work.

=== Career ===
==== Mount Holyoke College ====
Laird was hired by Mount Holyoke College as an assistant in physics in 1901. She was promoted to instructor the following year and appointed head of the Physics Department in 1903. During her time at Mount Holyoke College Laird worked on the properties of electromagnetic radiation, especially X-rays.

She was the first woman accepted by Sir J. J. Thomson to conduct research at Cambridge University's Cavendish Laboratory where she worked in the Summer 1905 and Spring 1909. She also studied at the University of Würzburg between 1913-1914 and at the University of Chicago in 1919. She retired to emerita status in 1940.

==== Later career ====
Laird came out of retirement during World War II to research radar at University of Western Ontario for the Canadian National Research Council. Her retirement home was in London, Ontario and she turned up at the research centre in 1940, asking to help. She worked there without pay but took a full part in the research, including the experiments in the unheated antenna building. Laird presented several top secret reports on her findings to the National Research Council, taught army and navy personnel, and took her turn monitoring the unheated observation station on the university's campus.

In 1945, she was made an honorary professor of physics at the University of Western Ontario and continued working upon the absorption of ultra-high frequency radiation by tissue. Her research studying the effects of microwave radiation on biological materials was supported by the Ontario Cancer Treatment and Research Foundation. By the time she retired for the second time in 1953, she was not only one of Canada's most distinguished physicists, but also the oldest. Physicist A.D. Misener said that Laird was "the rare combination of a conscientious and productive research worker and an inspiring and able teacher."

Laird died on March 3, 1969, in London.

== Honours and awards ==
The annual Elizabeth Laird Memorial Lecture series, at the University of Western Ontario, was created in 1970 and "honours a remarkable person in Western’s history and was the first lecture series in the Faculty of Science to carry the name of an individual." Memorial University in Newfoundland and Labrador also holds The Elizabeth R. Laird Lecture, established by a bequest from Dr. Elizabeth Laird.

- Fellowship, Bryn Mawr College 1897
- President's European Fellowship 1898–99
- Fellow, American Physical Society
- Sara Berliner Research Fellow in Würzburg 1913–14
- Honorary Research Fellow, Yale University 1925–26
- Honorary D.Sc., Toronto University 1927
- Honorary LL.D., Western Ontario University 1945
