= Canadian Association of Law Teachers =

Canadian academic organization

The Canadian Association of Law Teachers is an academic organization in Canada, founded in 1951.

== History ==
The Canadian Association of Law Teachers (CALT) was founded in 1951 by McGill University Faculty of Law professor F. R. Scott following a gathering of law teachers in 1947. The original name of the organization was the Association of Canadian Law Teachers, and the first president of the organization was G. F. Curtis, then dean of law at the University of British Columbia. The first meeting was held at McGill and the first annual meeting was held at the Laval University, and the constitution was adopted in 1951. In 1952 there were only fifty-six full time law professors in the entire country of Canada, and nearly half of them were in attendance in the first meetings of the organization. During the first few years of the organization, the president of CALT was a guest at the annual meeting of the Association of American Law Schools as well.

== Canadian Legal Education Annual Review ==
In addition to annual conferences, CALT also publishes the peer-reviewed journal Canadian Legal Education Annual Review. The current Editors-in-chief are Sara Ross and Wendy Parkes.
