= Edwin Jacob (priest) =

Canadian educationist and priest

Edwin Jacob (baptized 9 December 1793 – 31 May 1868) was a Canadian educationist and Church of England priest.

In 1829 Jacob became the first vice-president, principal and chair of divinity of King's College, Fredericton.
