= Dalhousie University =

Public university in Nova Scotia, Canada

- Official seal
- Latin: Universitas Dalhousiana
- Former names: Dalhousie College; (1818–1863); The Governors of Dalhousie College and University; (1863–1996)
- Motto: Ora et Labora (Latin); On seal: Doctrina vim promovet insitam (Latin)
- Motto in English: Pray and work On seal: Teaching promotes innate ability
- Type: Public research university
- Established: 1818; 208 years ago
- Academic affiliations: ACU; CARL; CUSID; Universities Canada; U15
- Endowment: C$1.0074 billion (2025)
- Chancellor: Rustum Southwell
- President: Kim Brooks
- Provost: Wanda Costen
- Faculty: 867 full-time; 274 clinical dentistry and medicine; 826 part-time
- Students: 21,345 (Fall 2026)
- Undergraduates: 16,754
- Postgraduates: 4,591
- Location: Halifax, Nova Scotia, Canada (Note: Three of the university's campuses are located within Halifax. However, the institution's faculty of agriculture also maintains a campus in Truro, Nova Scotia.); 44°38′13″N 63°35′30″W
- Campus: Studley campus, 79 acres (32 ha); Agricultural Campus, 151 acres (61 ha)
Colours
Wingtip Black, Beak Gold, Cloud White
- Nicknames: Tigers; Rams (Note: Rams is used to refer to athletic teams based at the agricultural campus in Bible Hill)
- Sporting affiliations: U Sports, (AUS, RSEQ), ACAA, CCAA
- Website: www.dal.ca

Dalhousie University is a large public research university in Nova Scotia, Canada, with three campuses in Halifax, a fourth in Bible Hill, and two satellite medical school campuses, in Saint John, New Brunswick and in Cape Breton. Dalhousie offers over 200 degree programs in 13 undergraduate, graduate, and professional faculties. The university is a member of the U15, a group of research-intensive universities in Canada.

The institution was established as Dalhousie College, a nonsectarian institution established in 1818 by the eponymous Lieutenant Governor of Nova Scotia, George Ramsay, 9th Earl of Dalhousie, with education reformer Thomas McCulloch as its first principal. However, the college did not hold its first class until 1838, with operations remaining sporadic due to financial difficulties. The college was reorganized in 1863 and renamed The Governors of Dalhousie College and University. The university formally changed its name to Dalhousie University in 1997 through the same provincial legislation that merged the institution with the Technical University of Nova Scotia.

Dalhousie's varsity teams, the Tigers, compete in the Atlantic University Sport conference of Canadian Interuniversity Sport. Dalhousie's Faculty of Agriculture varsity teams are called the Dalhousie Rams, and compete in the ACAA and CCAA. Dalhousie is a coeducational university with more than 20,000 students and 150,000 alumni around the world. The university's notable alumni include a Nobel Prize winner and 94 Rhodes Scholars.

== History ==
Dalhousie was founded, as the Lieutenant Governor of Nova Scotia George Ramsay, 9th Earl of Dalhousie, desired a non-denominational college in Halifax. Financing largely came from customs duties collected by a previous Lieutenant Governor, John Coape Sherbrooke, during the War of 1812 occupation of Castine, Maine; (Note: The British named the colony New Ireland.) Sherbrooke invested £7,000 as an initial endowment and reserved £3,000 for the physical construction of the college. The college was established in 1818 though it faltered shortly after, as Ramsay left Halifax to serve as the Governor General of British North America. The school was structured upon the principles of the University of Edinburgh, located near Ramsay's home in Scotland, where lectures were open to male students, regardless of Christian religion or nationality.

In 1821, Dalhousie College was officially incorporated by the Nova Scotia House of Assembly under the 1821 Act of Incorporation. The college did not hold its first class until 1838; operation of the college was intermittent and no degrees were awarded. In 1841, an Act of the Nova Scotia House of Assembly conferred university powers on Dalhousie.

Dalhousie's first principal was Thomas McCulloch. A Presbyterian minister and naturalist, he was the founder of Nova Scotia's second degree-granting institution (after King's College, now University of King's College), Pictou Academy in Pictou, Nova Scotia, which attracted students from PEI, Cape Breton, as well as the Caribbean due to McCulloch's views and the school's ecumenical stance.

In 1838, the board of Dalhousie College was able to convince McCulloch leave Pictou Academy and take on the floundering Dalhousie. With a reputation as an anti-papal pamphleteer and firmly against the Church of England's hold on higher education in Nova Scotia (through King's College), McCulloch carried with him from Pictou his education theory and pedagogy, "If Dalhousie College acquires usefulness and eminence, it will be not by an imitation of Oxford, but as an institution of science, and practical intelligence." His approach to education was radical: he firmly believed that all schools "ought first to be ascertained, how far it is calculated to improve the community; and, if its general utility appear, it is, in proportion to its value and to the extent of the public funds, unquestionably entitled to the protection of Government, whether it belong to churchmen or [Presbyterian] dissenters, protestants or catholics, ought to be entirely disregarded!" He was responsible for creating a chair of natural history at Dalhousie to teach "geology, mineralogy, botany, and zoology."

Following McCulloch's death, the college fell into decline once again and was reorganized as a high school in 1848. In 1863, the college opened for a third time and was reorganized by another legislative act, which added "University" to the school's name: "The Governors of Dalhousie College and University". Dalhousie reopened with six professors and one tutor. When it awarded its first degrees in 1866, the student body consisted of 28 male students working toward degrees and 28 occasional students.

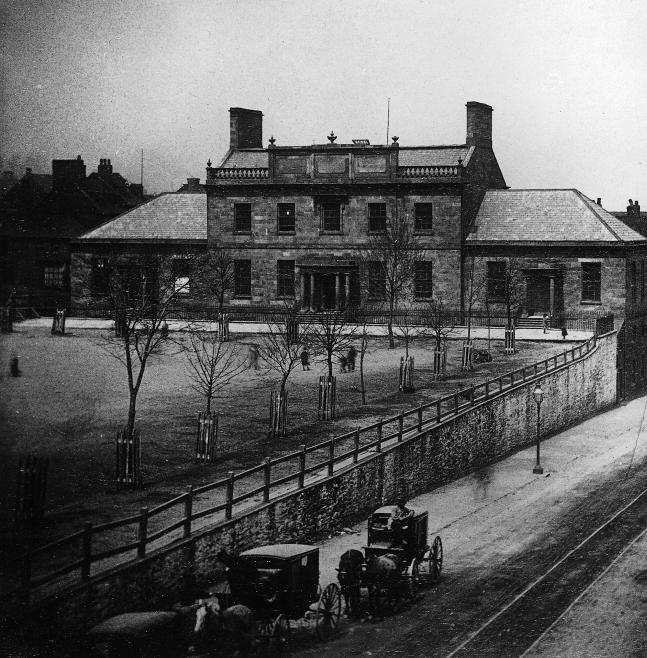
The original Dalhousie College building in 1871. The university was situated at the Grand Parade until it moved in 1886.

Despite the reorganization and an increase in students, money continued to be a problem for the institution. In 1879, amid talks of closure due to the university's dire financial situation, George Munro, a wealthy New York publisher with Nova Scotian roots, began to donate to the university; Munro was brother-in-law to Dalhousie's Board of Governors member John Forrest. As such, Munro is credited with rescuing Dalhousie from closure. In honour of his contributions, Dalhousie observes a university holiday called George Munro Day on the first Friday of each February. The first female graduate was Margaret Florence Newcombe from Grafton, Nova Scotia, who earned a Bachelor of Arts degree in 1885.

Originally located at the space now occupied by Halifax City Hall, the college moved in 1886 to Carleton Campus and spread gradually to Studley Campus. Dalhousie grew steadily during the 20th century. From 1889 to 1962 the Halifax Conservatory was affiliated with and awarded degrees through Dalhousie. In 1920, several buildings were destroyed by fire on the campus of the University of King's College in Windsor, Nova Scotia. Through a grant from the Carnegie Foundation, King's College relocated to Halifax and entered into a partnership with Dalhousie that continues to this day.

Dalhousie expanded on 1 April 1997 when provincial legislation mandated an amalgamation with the nearby Technical University of Nova Scotia. This merger saw reorganization of faculties and departments to create the Faculty of Engineering, Faculty of Computer Science and the Faculty of Architecture and Planning. From 1997 to 2000, the Technical University of Nova Scotia operated as a constituent college of Dalhousie called Dalhousie Polytechnic of Nova Scotia (DalTech) until the collegiate system was dissolved. The legislation that merged the two schools also formally changed the name of the institution to its present form, Dalhousie University. On 1 September 2012, the Nova Scotia Agricultural College merged into Dalhousie to form a new Faculty of Agriculture, located in Bible Hill, Nova Scotia.

== Campuses ==
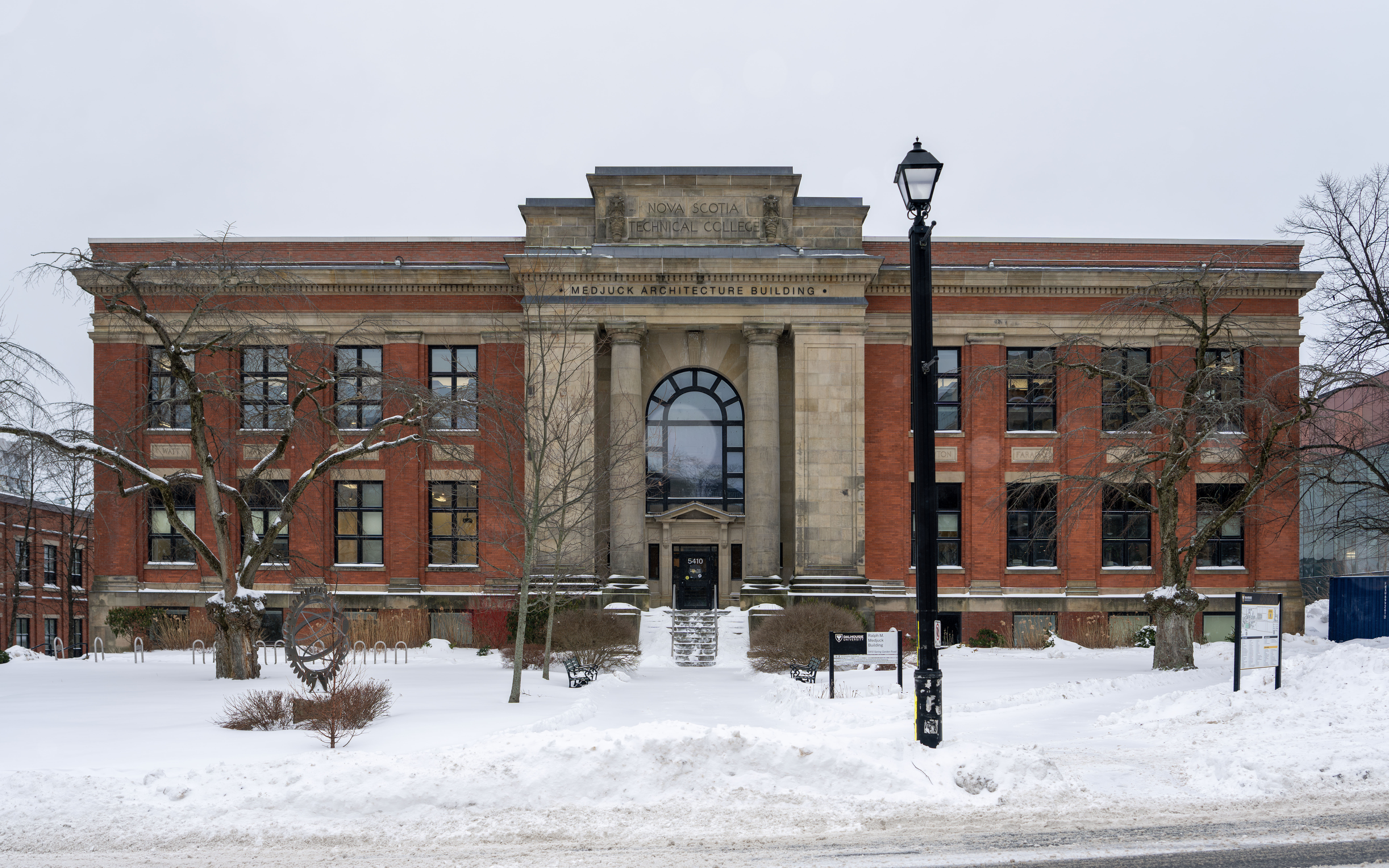
The Faculty of Architecture and Planning building is located at Sexton Campus. Sexton was the former campus of the Technical University of Nova Scotia before its merger with Dalhousie in 1997.

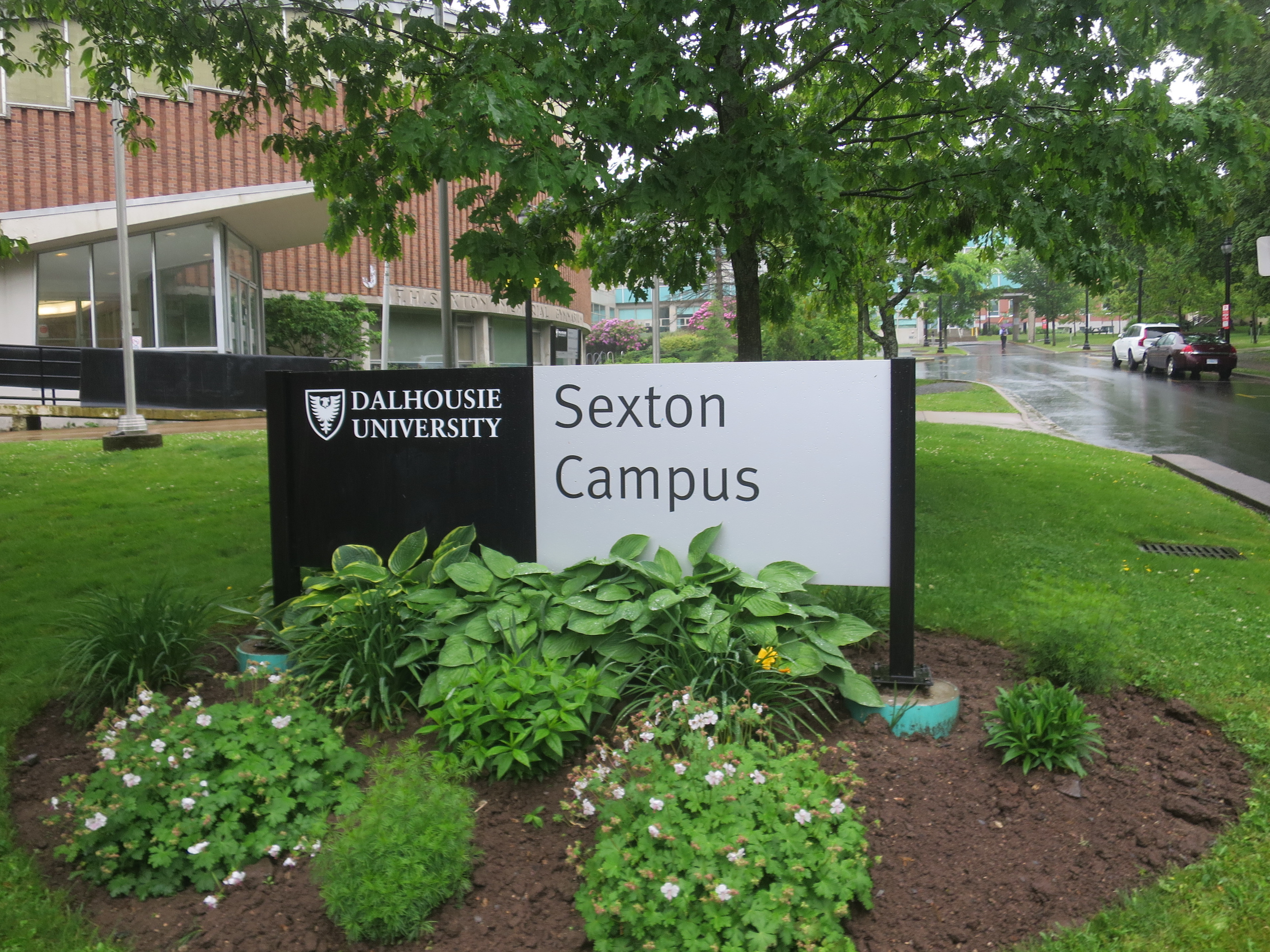
Sexton Campus sign

Dalhousie has three campuses within the Halifax Peninsula and a fourth, the Agricultural Campus, in Bible Hill, Nova Scotia.

Studley Campus in Halifax serves as the primary campus; it houses the majority of the university's academic buildings such as faculties, athletic facilities, and the university's Student Union Building. The campus is largely surrounded by residential neighbourhoods.

Robie Street divides it from the adjacent Carleton Campus, which houses the faculties of dentistry, medicine, and other health profession departments. The campus is adjacent to two large teaching hospitals affiliated with the school: the IWK Health Centre and the Queen Elizabeth II Health Sciences Centre.

Sexton Campus in Downtown Halifax hosts the engineering, architecture and planning faculties. Sexton Campus served as the campus of the Technical University of Nova Scotia prior to amalgamation. The Agricultural Campus in Bible Hill, a suburban community of Truro, served as the campus for the Nova Scotia Agricultural College prior to its merger with Dalhousie in 2011. The university presently operates the largest academic library system in Atlantic Canada, and hosts the headquarters for the Ocean Tracking Network.

The buildings at Dalhousie vary in age from Hart House, which was completed in 1864, to the Collaborative Health Education Building, completed in 2015. The original building of Dalhousie University was completed in 1824 on Halifax's Grand Parade. It was demolished in 1885 when the university outgrew the premises, and the City of Halifax sought possession of the entire Grand Parade. Halifax City Hall presently occupies the site of the original Dalhousie College.

=== Libraries and museums ===
The university has five libraries. The largest, Killam Memorial Library, opened in 1971 and claims to be the largest academic library in Atlantic Canada. The W. K. Kellogg Health Science Library provides services largely for the faculties of dentistry, medicine, and other health professions. The Sexton Design & Technology Library is located within Sexton Campus. Its collection largely serves those in the faculties of engineering, architecture and planning, and houses the university's rare books collection. The Sir James Dunn Law Library holds the university's collection of common law materials, legal periodicals, as well as books on international law, health law, and environmental law. MacRae Library is located at the university's Agricultural Campus, and has the largest collection of agricultural resource material in Atlantic Canada. The Dalhousie University Archives houses official records of, or relating to, or people/activities connected with Dalhousie University and its founding institutions. The archives also houses material related to theatre, business and labour in Nova Scotia. The collection consists of manuscripts, texts, photographs, audio-visual material, microfilm, music, and artifacts. The university's first library, Macdonald Memorial Library, was built after alumni raised funds on the death of professor Charles Macdonald, who had left the university $2,000 to buy books in English literature on his death in 1901.

The biology department operates the Thomas McCulloch Museum in its Life Sciences Centre (LSC). The most notable of the museum's exhibits include its preserved birds collection. Other collections include its Lorenzen ceramic mushrooms, its coral and shell collection, and its butterfly and insect collection. The museum's namesake Thomas McCulloch was a Scottish Presbyterian minister who served as Dalhousie's first president and created the Audubon mounted bird collection which is now housed at the museum.

The Dalhousie Art Gallery is both a public gallery and an academic support unit housed since 1971 on the lowest level of the Dalhousie Arts Centre. Admission is free of charge. It is host to a permanent collection of over 1000 works. Some of the outdoor sculptures around the campus are part of this collection, such as the distinctive Marine Venus which has sat in the median of University Avenue since 1969. A notable exhibition from the Dalhousie Art Gallery includes "Archives of the Future" (March – April 2016) exploring the relationship between art creation and commerce with work by artists Zachary Gough, Dawn Georg, Sharlene Bamboat, Katie Vida and Dana Claxton.

=== Sustainability ===
Dalhousie University is actively involved in sustainability issues and has received a number of sustainability awards and recognition for academic programs, university operations, and research. In 2022, Dalhousie received a GOLD rating from AASHE STARS (Version 2.2). In 2009, the university signed the University and College Presidents' Climate Change Statement of Action for Canada to reduce emissions of greenhouse gases. Dalhousie is also a signatory of UNEP's International Declaration on Cleaner Production. In 1999, the university signed the Talloires Declaration, which committed Dalhousie and other higher education institutions to developing, creating, supporting, and maintaining sustainability.

== Administration ==
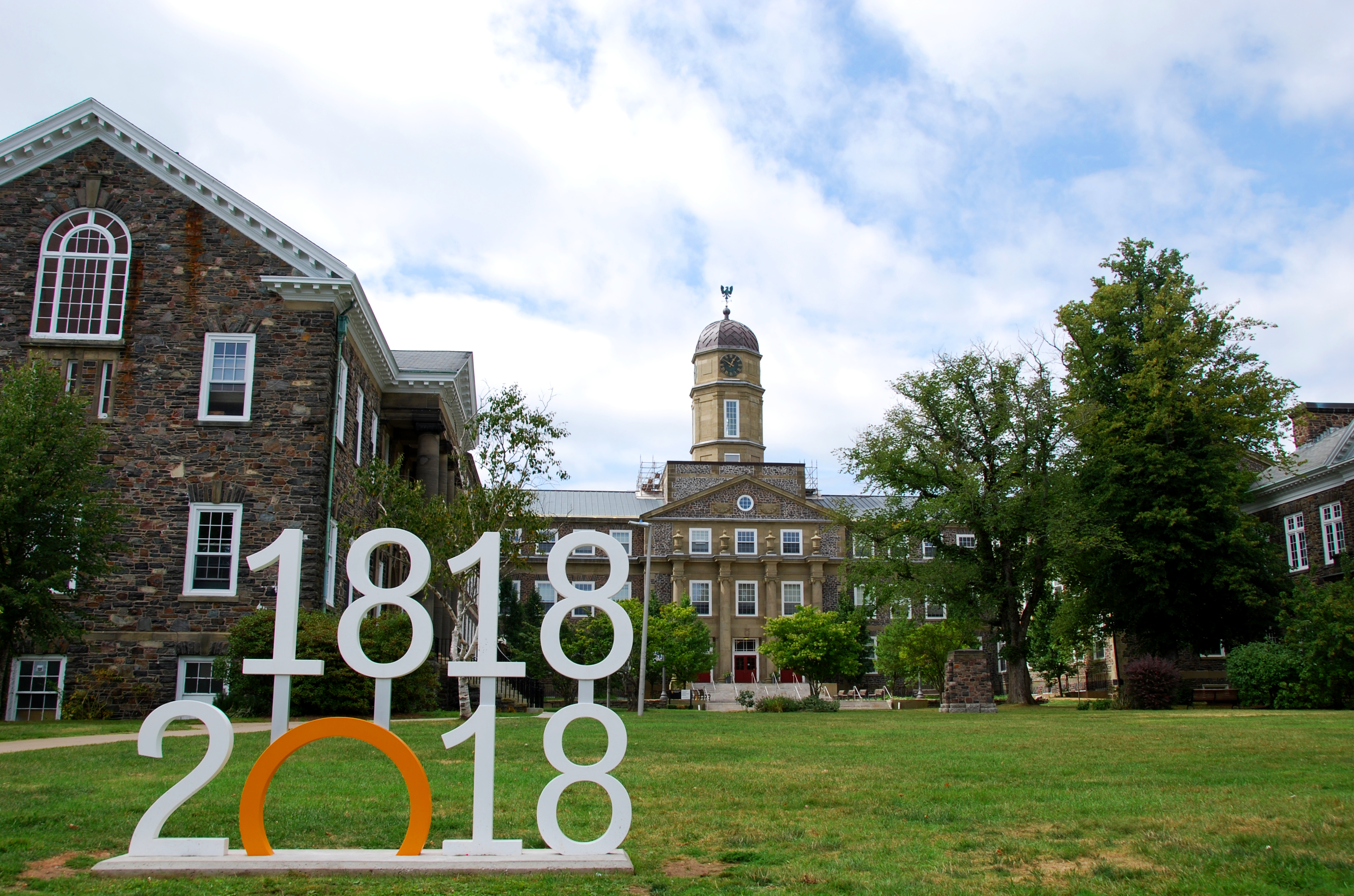
Henry Hicks Academic Administration Building is located at Dalhousie's Studley Campus, and houses many of Dalhousie's administrative offices.

University governance is conducted through the Board of Governors and the Senate, both of which were given much of their present power in the Unofficial Consolidation of an Act for the Regulation and Support of Dalhousie College in Chapter 24 of the Acts of 1863. This statute replaced ones from 1820, 1823, 1838, 1841 and 1848, and has since been supplemented 11 times, most recently in 1995. The Board is responsible for conduct, management, and control of the university and of its property, revenues, business, and affairs. Board members, known as Governors of the Board, include the university's chancellor, president, and 25 other members. Members include people from within the university community such as four approved representatives from Dalhousie Student Union, and those in the surrounding community, such as the Mayor of Halifax. The Senate is responsible for the university's academics, including standards for admission and qualifications for degrees, diplomas, and certificates. The Senate consists of 73 positions granted to the various faculty representatives, academic administrators, and student representatives.

The president acts as the chief executive officer and is responsible to the Board of Governors and to the Senate for the supervision of administrative and academic works. Thomas McCulloch served as the first president when the office was created in 1838. John Forrest was the longest-serving president, holding the office from 1885 to 1911. Kim Brooks is the 13th president of the university, and has served since August 2023. In August 2025, under the leadership of President Brooks, the university took the unprecedented action of locking out approximately 1000 members of the Dalhousie Faculty Association. The contract dispute primarily focused on Dalhousie's use of non permanent contracts, creating precocity amongst certain faulty and cost of living salary increases. The lock out lasted one month, and despite demands from the student union, no refunds were given to students who missed class time. It also had negative impacts on research as locked out faculty had no ability to complete work or apply for grants.

=== Affiliated institutions ===
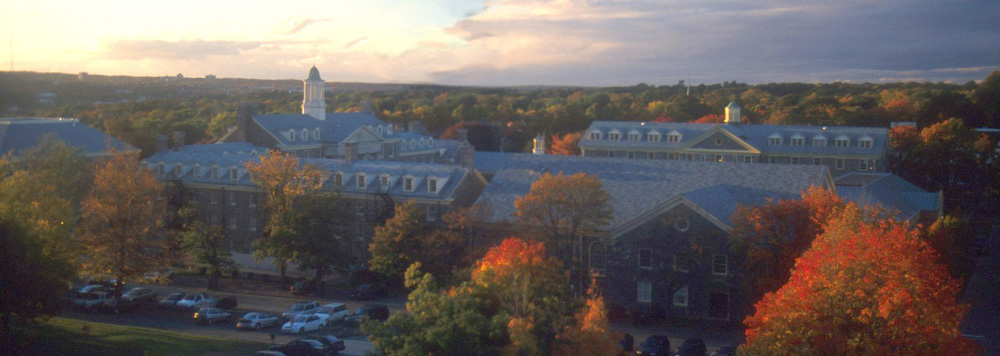
The campus of University of King's College, located adjacent to Dalhousie's Studley campus. The institution has been affiliated with Dalhousie since the 1920s.

University of King's College is a post-secondary institution in Halifax affiliated with Dalhousie. The institution's campus is located adjacent to Dalhousie's Studley campus. Established in 1789, it was the first post-secondary institution in English Canada and the oldest English-speaking Commonwealth university outside the United Kingdom. The University of King's College was formerly an independent institution located in Windsor, Nova Scotia, until 1920, when a fire ravaged its campus. To continue operation, the University of King's College accepted a generous grant from the Carnegie Foundation, although the terms of the grant required that it move to Halifax and enter into association with Dalhousie. Under the agreement, King's agreed to pay the salaries of a number of Dalhousie professors, who in turn were to help in the management and academic life of the college.

Students at King's have access to all of the amenities at Dalhousie, and academic programs at King's would fold into the College of Arts and Sciences at Dalhousie according to the agreement. Presently, students of both institutions are allowed to switch between the two throughout their enrolment. In spite of the shared academic programs and facilities, the University of King's College maintains its own scholarships, bursaries, athletics programs, and student residences.

=== Finances ===
The university completed the 2017–18 year with revenues of $697.354 million and expenses of $664.274 million, yielding a surplus of $33.08 million. The largest source of revenue for the university was provincial operational grants, followed by tuition fees. The total endowment revenue reported in fiscal 2017–2018 was $481.372 million.

In August 2025, the university became the first U15 institution in Canada to initiate a lockout against their faculty labour union, several days before the union was able to complete their vote on the university's final offer. The university claimed that they did not have the financial capacity to have their wages keep up with inflation; whereas the union claimed that the university favoured spending on infrastructure such as a new sports arena over paying their employees a fair wage. At the end of a one month lock-out, Dalhousie paid out nearly twice what they claimed they could initially afford. The student union issued calls for tuition to be returned due to the unnecessary labour tactic used by president Kim Brooks and her Board of Governors. However, no refunds were given. The lockout also sparked criticism about the university's paid participation with Nous Data Insights, an Australian based consulting firm which has been known for making cuts to the academic side of universities in favour of profit.

=== Diversity ===
There have been several Dalhousie University scandals related to discrimination at the university. In reaction to this, the university has initiated recruitment strategies to increase the representation of under-represented groups at Dalhousie.

== Academics ==
Dalhousie is a publicly funded research university, and a member of the Association of Universities and Colleges of Canada, as well as the U15. As of 2022, there were 20,970 students enrolled at the university. Dalhousie offers more than 4,000 courses and over 200 degree programs in 13 undergraduate, graduate, and professional faculties. The requirements for admission differ between students from Nova Scotia, students from other provinces in Canada, and international students due to lack of uniformity in marking schemes. The requirements for admission also differ depending on the program. In 2011, the secondary school average for incoming first-year undergraduate students was 85 per cent.

Canadian students may apply for financial aid such as the Nova Scotia Student Assistance Program and Canada Student Loans and Grants through the federal and provincial governments. Financial aid may also be provided in the form of loans, grants, bursaries, scholarships, fellowships, debt reduction, interest relief, and work programs. The university's registrar provides scholarships for its students in order to provide financial assistance, or to reward academic merits or performances in another fields, such as community involvement and leadership.

=== Reputation ===
University rankings

World rankings
- ARWU World: 301–400
- QS World: 275
- THE World: 301–350
- THE Employability: 186
- USNWR World: 385

Canadian rankings
- QS National: 12
- THE National: 12–15
- USNWR National: 11
- Maclean's Medical/Doctoral: 9
- Maclean's Reputation: 10

The 2025 Academic Ranking of World Universities ranked Dalhousie University 301–400 in the world and 11–15 in Canada. The 2025 QS World University Rankings ranked the university 275th in the world, and twelfth in Canada. The 2025 Times Higher Education World University Rankings placed Dalhousie 301–350 in the world. In the 2025 U.S. News & World Report Best Global University Ranking, the university placed 385th in the world, and 11th in Canada. In terms of national rankings, Maclean's ranked Dalhousie ninth in their 2026 Medical-Doctoral university rankings. Dalhousie was ranked in spite of having opted out – along with several other universities in Canada – of participating in Maclean's graduate survey since 2006.

Dalhousie also placed in rankings that evaluated the employment prospects of its graduates. In QS's 2022 graduate employability ranking, the university ranked 301–500 in the world, and 9–17 in Canada.

=== Research ===
In 2018, Research Infosource ranked Dalhousie as 15th on their list for top 50 research universities in Canada, with a sponsored research income (external sources of funding) of $150.038 million in 2017. In the same year, Dalhousie's faculty averaged a sponsored research income of $130,000, while its graduate students averaged a sponsored research income of $44,600. In 2003 and 2004, The Scientist placed Dalhousie among the top five places in the world outside the United States for postdoctoral work and conducting scientific research. In 2007 Dalhousie topped the list of The Scientist's "Best Places to Work in Academia". The annual list divides research and academic institutions into American and international lists; Dalhousie University ranked first in the international category. According to a survey conducted by The Scientist, Dalhousie was the best non-commercial scientific institute in which to work in Canada.

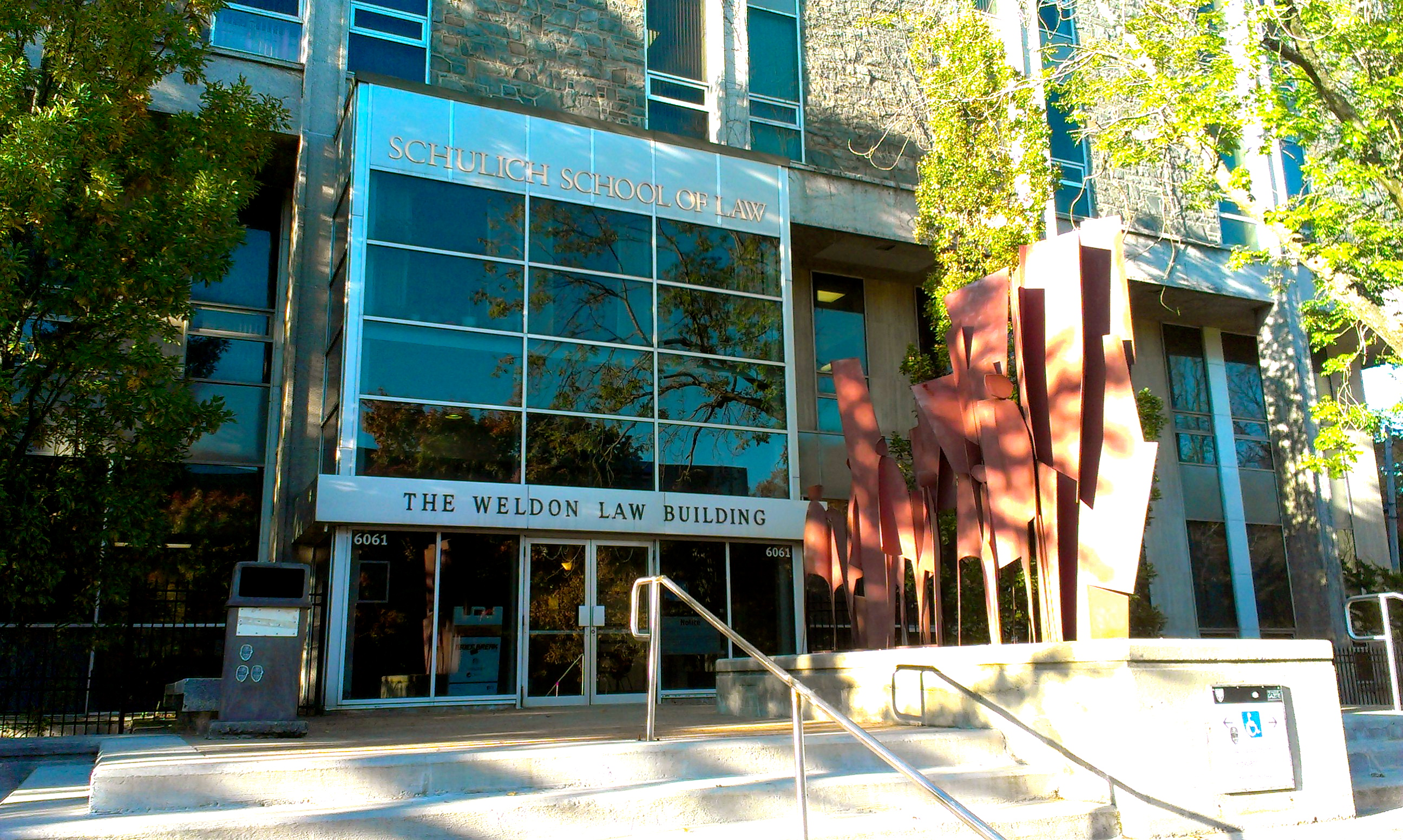
The Marine & Environmental Law Institute is housed at the university's Weldon Law Building. Conducting research and consultancy activities, it is one of several research institutes operated by the university.

Dalhousie's research performance has been noted in several bibliometric university rankings, which use citation analysis to evaluate the impact a university has on academic publications. In 2019, the Performance Ranking of Scientific Papers for World Universities ranked Dalhousie 301st in the world, tied for 12th in Canada with the University of Manitoba; whereas the University Ranking by Academic Performance 2018–19 rankings placed the university 302nd in the world, and 13th in Canada.

Marine research at Dalhousie has become a large focus of the university, with many of the university's faculty members involved in some form of marine research. Notably, Dalhousie is the headquarters of the Ocean Tracking Network, a research effort using implanted acoustic transmitters to study fish migration patterns. Dalhousie houses a number of marine research pools, a wet laboratory, and a benthic flume, which are collectively known as the Aquatron laboratory. Dalhousie is one of the founding members of the Halifax Marine Research Institute, founded on 2 June 2011. The institute, which is a partnership between a number of private industries, government, and post-secondary institutions, was designed to help increase the scale, quality, internationalization and impact of marine research in the region. In 2011, the university, along with WWF-Canada, created the Conservation Legacy For Oceans, which aimed at providing scholarships, funding, curriculum development, and work placements for students and academics dedicated to marine research, law, management, and policy making. In 2016, Dalhousie partnered with Memorial University of Newfoundland and the University of Prince Edward Island to form a collaborative research organization known as The Ocean Frontier Institute.

Many of Dalhousie's faculties and departments focus on marine research. The Faculty of Engineering operates the Ocean Research Centre Atlantic, which is dedicated to research and tests in naval and off-shore engineering. Schulich School of Law also operates the Marine & Environmental Law Institute, which carries out research and conducts consultancy activities for governmental and non-governmental organizations. The school's Department of Political Science similarly operates the Centre for Foreign Policy Studies, which is primarily concerned with the fields of Canadian and American foreign, security, and defence policy, including maritime security policy.

== Student life ==
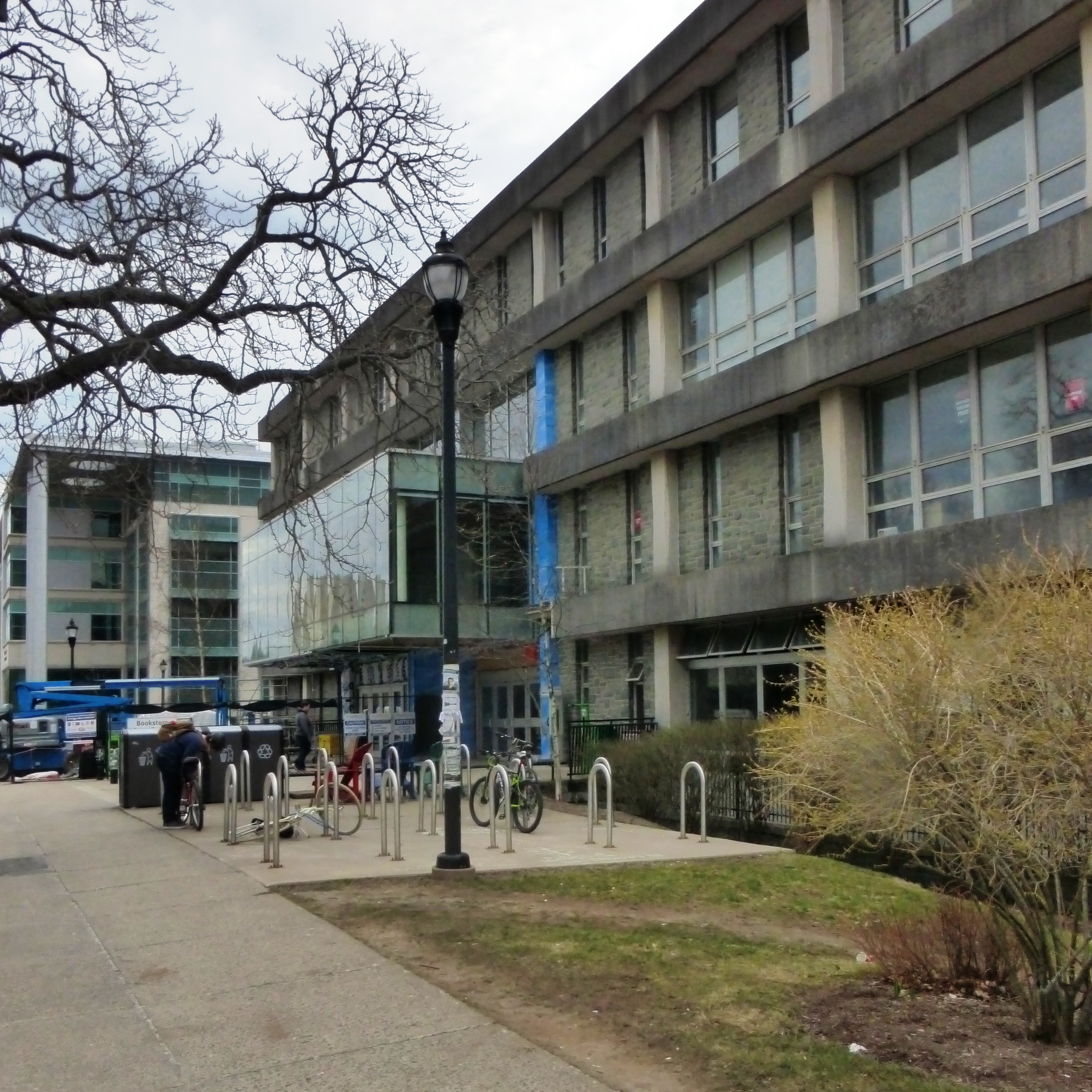
The Student Union Building is a hub of student extracurricular and social life on campus. It houses a number of student organizations and clubs including Dalhousie Student Union.

The student body of Dalhousie is currently represented by two student unions; the Dalhousie Student Union, which represents the general student population, and the Dalhousie Association for Graduate Students, which represents the interests of graduate students specifically. As of 2011, there were three sororities and three fraternities. They operate as non-accredited organizations and are not recognized by the Dalhousie Student Union.

The main student newspaper, The Dalhousie Gazette, claims to be the oldest student-run newspaper in North America. The newspaper's offices are in the Student Union building. The radio station began as a radio club in 1964 and operated as CKDU in 1975; it began FM broadcasting in 1985. CKDU acquired its present frequency 88.1 in 2006 and upgraded its transmitting power.

In 2021 and 2022, controversies arose around alcohol consumption at unsanctioned student gatherings on campus, specifically 'homecoming' in early October. Halifax Police urged the university to play a more active role in the issue.

=== Clubs and societies ===
In addition to the efforts made by the Dalhousie Student Union (DSU) Council, Dalhousie students have created and participated in over 320 clubs/societies. The Management Society, for example, is a group of students in the Faculty of Management who group together to enhance the experience of students in that faculty by hosting events, providing assistance and giving back. Until 25 July 2016, Dalhousie offered a website named "Tiger Society" which listed all current clubs and societies that were available for students to join. Through this website, students could request to join a society. Dalhousie also holds a Society Fair at the beginning of each fall and winter semester, in which all societies are given the opportunity to display their purpose/efforts and recruit new members. Student societies partake in a range of activities from simple gatherings, study groups, bake sales, intramural sports teams, to organizing larger scale fundraising events.

=== Athletics ===
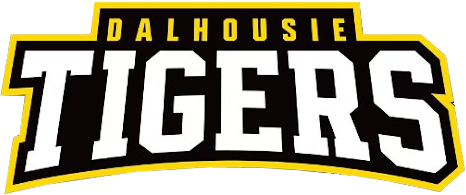
Dalhousie athletics wordmark

Dalhousie's sports teams are called the Tigers. The Tigers varsity teams participate primarily in the Atlantic University Sport (AUS) of U Sports. There are teams for basketball, hockey, soccer, swimming, track and field, cross country running, and volleyball. The Tigers garnered a number of championships in the first decade of the 20th century, winning 63 AUS championships and two U Sports championships. More than 2,500 students participate in competitive clubs, intramural sport leagues, and tournaments. Opportunities are offered at multiple skill levels across a variety of sports. Dalhousie has six competitive sports clubs and 17 recreational clubs. Dalhousie's Agricultural Campus operates its own varsity team, called the Dalhousie Rams. The Rams varsity team participates in the Atlantic Collegiate Athletic Association, a member of the Canadian Collegiate Athletic Association. The Rams varsity teams include badminton, basketball, rugby, soccer, volleyball, and woodsmen.

== Insignia and other representations ==
=== Seal ===
The seal of the University is based on the heraldic achievement of Clan Ramsay of Scotland, of which founder George Ramsay was clan head. The heraldic achievement consists of five parts – shield, coronet, crest, supporters and motto. One major difference between the Ramsay achievement and the achievement on the seal is that the Ramsay achievement features a griffin and greyhound, whereas the seal has two dragons supporting the eagle-adorned shield. Initially, the Ramsay achievement was used to identify Dalhousie, but the seal has evolved with the amalgamations the university has undergone. The shield used by the university was originally silver-coloured, as the Ramsay arms are, but in 1950 the university's Board of Governors changed it to gold to match the university's colours of gold and black. These colours were adopted in 1887, after the rugby team led the debate about college colours for football jerseys. The shield seen on Dalhousie's seal has been used as the logo since 1987, with the present incarnation in use since 2022.

=== Motto and song ===
The university motto Ora et Labora translates from Latin as "pray and work"; it adopted in 1870 from the Earl of Dalhousie's motto to replace the university's original one, which the administration believed did not convey confidence. The original motto was Forsan (Latin for "perhaps"), and first appeared in the first Dalhousie Gazette of 1869. It was from Virgil's epic poem Aeneid, Book 1, line 203, Forsan et haec olim meminisse iuvabit, which translates as "Perhaps the time may come when these [difficulties] will be sweet to remember." In 2020, students and staff representatives sought to remove the inherently religious tone of the current motto and return to the first.

Among the school's songs is the "Carmina Dalhousiana", written in Halifax in 1882. A Dalhousie University songbook was compiled by Charles B. Weikel in 1904.

== Notable alumni ==
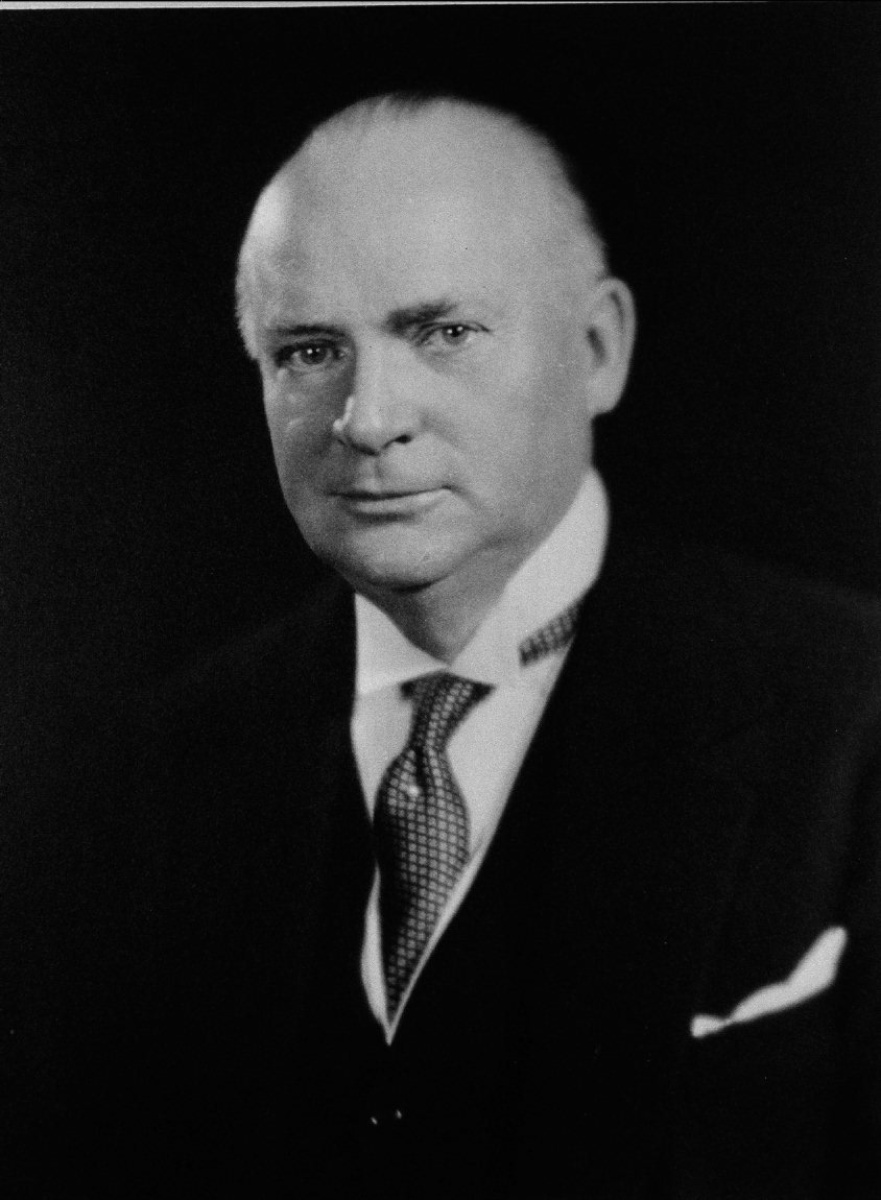
R. B. Bennett, 1st Viscount Bennett, 11th Prime Minister of Canada.

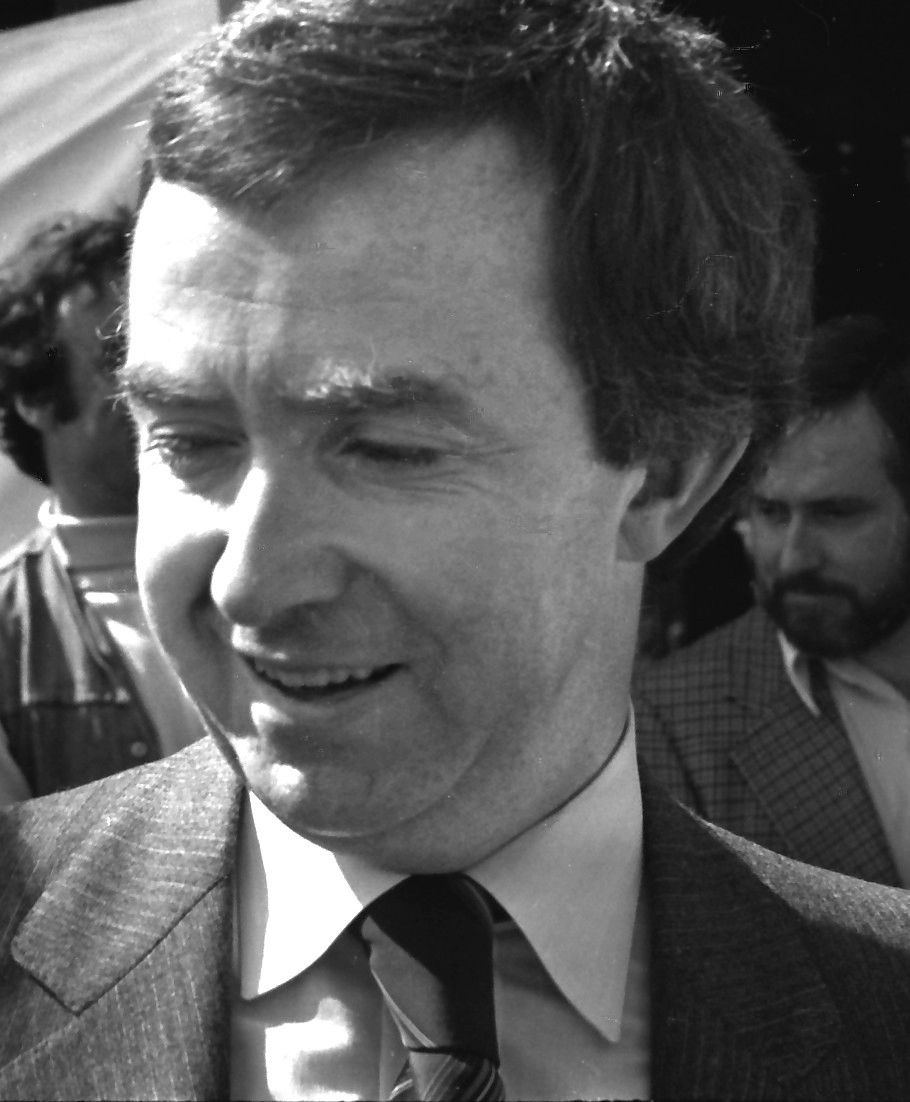
Joe Clark, 16th Prime Minister of Canada.

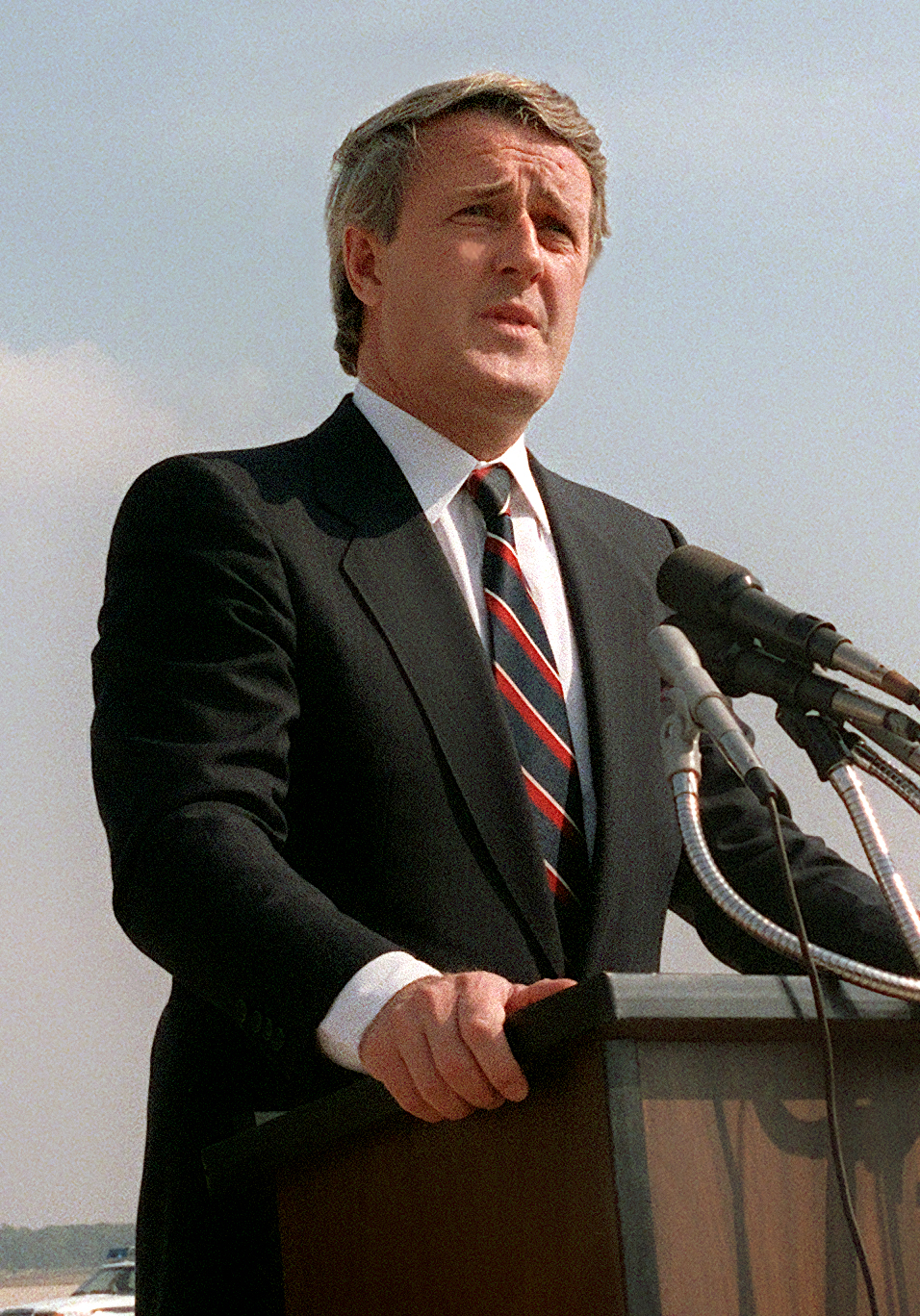
Brian Mulroney, 18th Prime Minister of Canada.

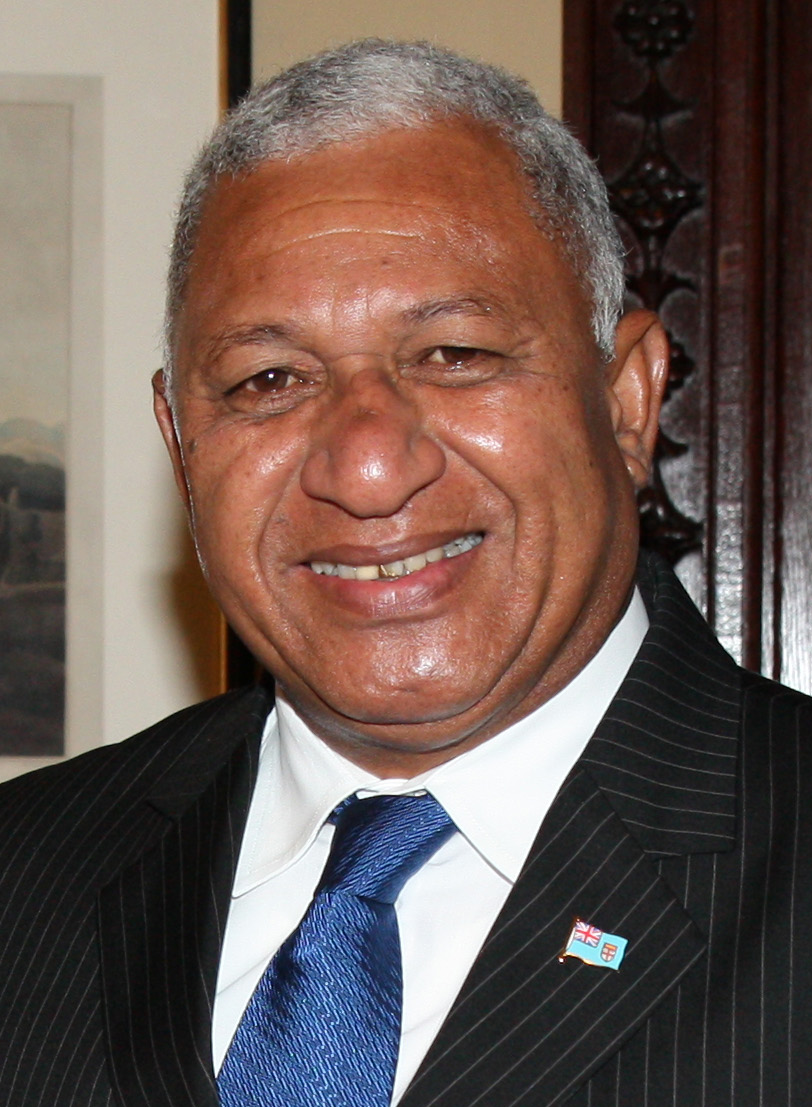
Frank Bainimarama, 8th Prime Minister of Fiji

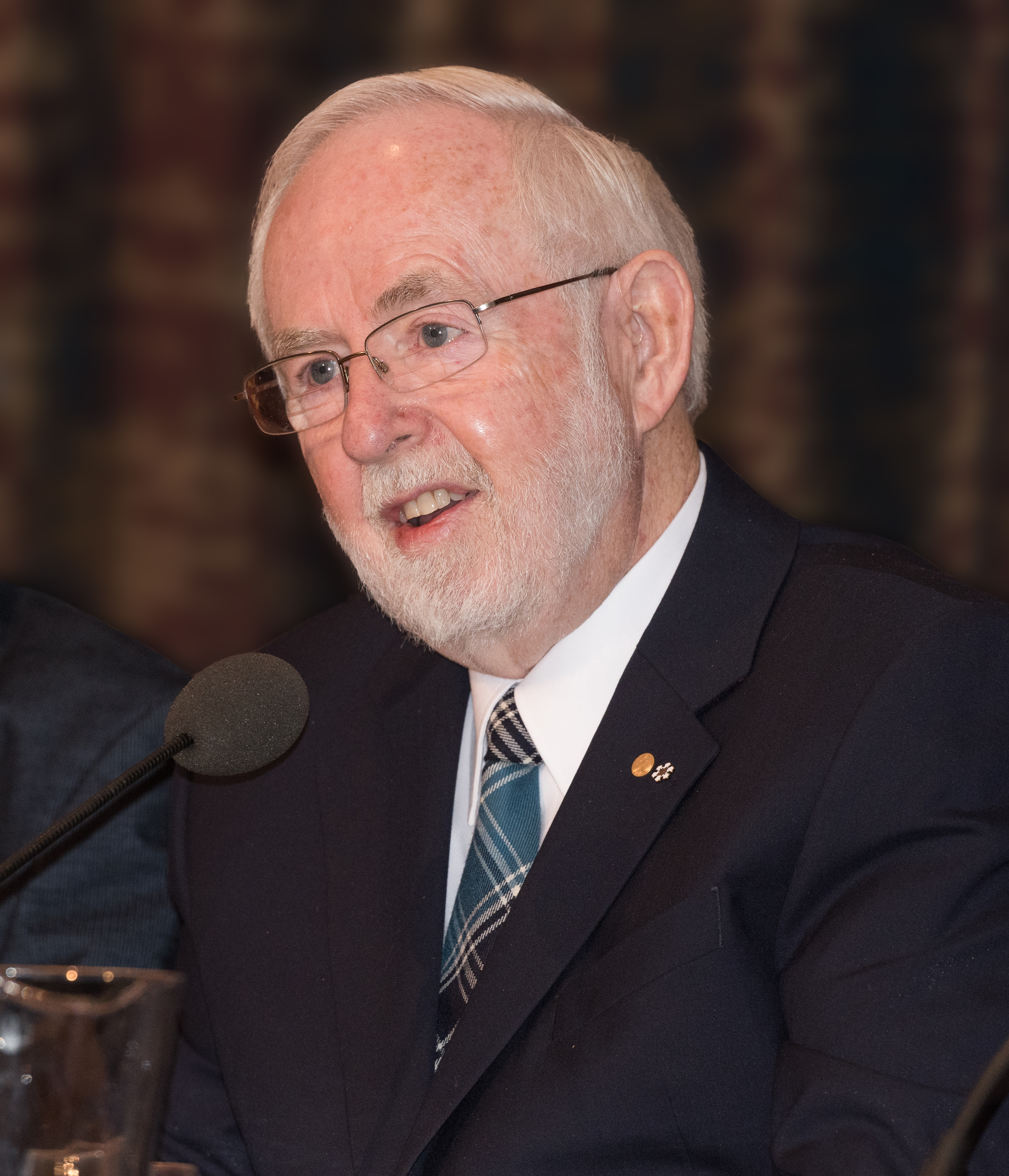
Arthur B. McDonald, awarded the Nobel Prize in physics for his work with solar neutrino.

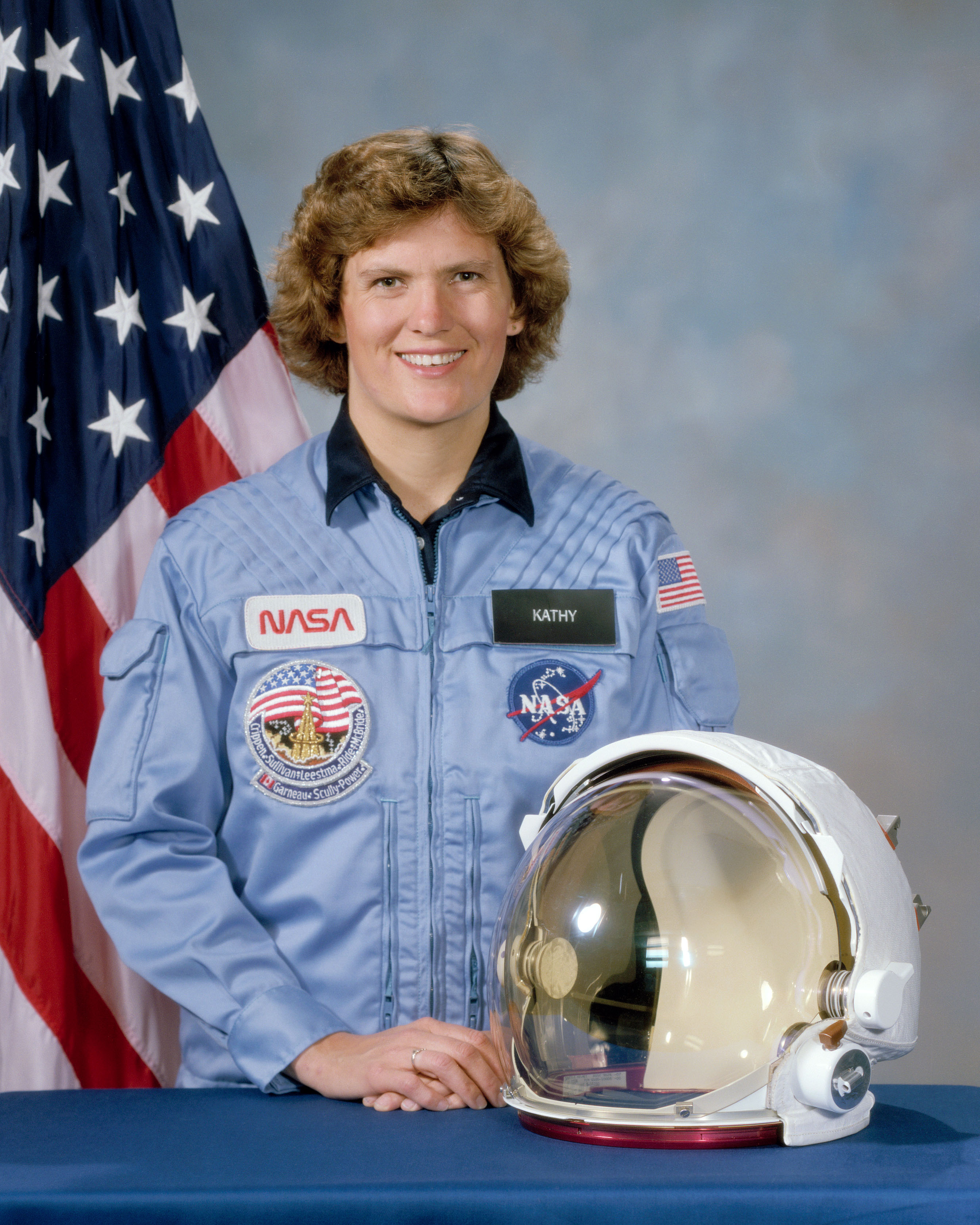
Kathryn D. Sullivan, first American woman to walk in space.

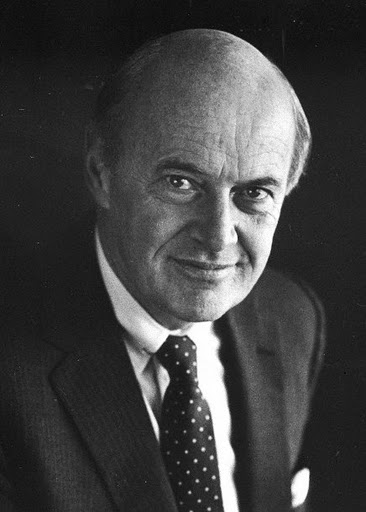
Charles Peter McColough, former chairman, CEO, and president of Xerox

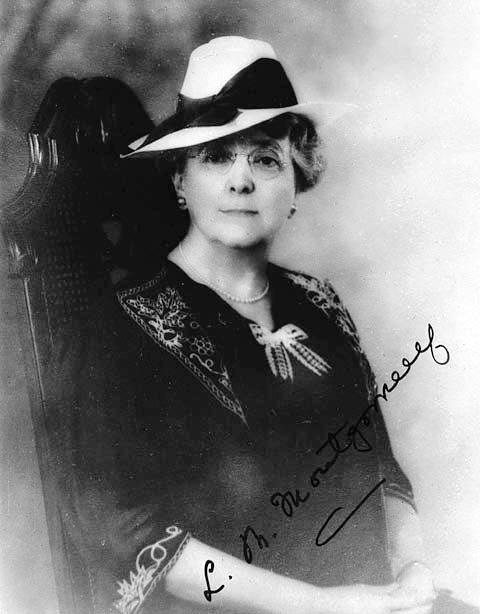
Lucy Maud Montgomery, author, best known for the Anne of Green Gables series

Dalhousie graduates have found success in a variety of fields, serving as heads of a diverse array of public and private institutions. Dalhousie University has over 130,000 alumni. Throughout Dalhousie's history, faculty, alumni, and former students have played prominent roles in many fields, and include 91 Rhodes Scholars.

Dalhousie has also educated Nobel laureates. Astrophysicist and Dalhousie alumni Arthur B. McDonald (BSc 1964, MSc 1965) received the 2015 Nobel Prize in Physics for identifying neutrino change identities and mass. McDonald was also previously awarded the Herzberg Prize and the Benjamin Franklin Prize in physics. Other notable graduates of Dalhousie includes Donald O. Hebb, who helped advance the field of neuropsychology, Kathryn D. Sullivan, the first American woman to walk in space and Jeff Dahn, one of the world's foremost researchers in lithium battery chemistry and aging. E. Elizabeth Patton, elected as a Fellow of the Royal Society of Edinburgh (2021) and Personal Chair in Melanoma Genetics and Drug Discovery, MRC Human Genetics Unit, Edinburgh.

Notable politicians who have attended Dalhousie include three Prime Ministers of Canada, R. B. Bennett, Joe Clark, and Brian Mulroney. Eight graduates have served as Lieutenant Governors: John Crosbie, Myra Freeman, Clarence Gosse, John Keiller MacKay, Henry Poole MacKeen, John Robert Nicholson, Fabian O'Dea, and Albert Walsh. Thirteen graduates have served as provincial premiers: Allan Blakeney, John Buchanan, Alex Campbell, Amor De Cosmos, Darrell Dexter, David Eby, Joe Ghiz, John Hamm, Angus Lewis Macdonald, Russell MacLellan, Gerald Regan, Robert Stanfield, Clyde Wells, and Danny Williams. The first woman appointed to the Supreme Court of Canada, Bertha Wilson, was a graduate from Dalhousie Law School.

Other notable alumni from the Dalhousie include Lucy Maud Montgomery, an author that wrote a series of novels, including Anne of Green Gables. Prominent business leaders who studied at Dalhousie include Jamie Baillie, former CEO of Credit Union Atlantic, Graham Day, former CEO of British Shipbuilders,Sean Durfy, former CEO of WestJet, and Charles Peter McColough, former president and CEO of Xerox.

== Fictional representations ==
Redmond College, attended by Anne Shirley in L.M. Montgomery's Anne of the Island, is based on Dalhousie.

== See also ==
- Higher education in Nova Scotia
- List of Canadian universities by endowment
- List of colleges and universities named after people
- List of fraternities and sororities at Dalhousie University
- List of universities in Nova Scotia
