= List of Dalhousie University people =

The following is a list of notable alumni, faculty, and others affiliated with Dalhousie University located in Halifax, Nova Scotia, Canada.

== Alumni ==
=== Scientists ===
- Robert Ackman (MS 1952), O.C. – omega-3 fatty acid research pioneer
- Martin Henry Dawson (BA 1916) – pioneer in penicillin therapy
- Erik Demaine (BSc. 1993) – youngest professor ever hired at Massachusetts Institute of Technology
- Danielle Fong (BSc. 2005) – pioneer in green energy
- Trudy Mackay (BSc, MSc) – quantitative geneticist, winner of the Wolf Prize in Agriculture in 2016
- John F. Marra, biological oceanographer
- Thomas Mason (BSc. 1986) – physicist, director of Los Alamos National Laboratory
- Arthur B. McDonald (BSc, MSc) – Nobel Laureate: 2015 Nobel Prize in Physics
- Kathryn D. Sullivan (PhD 1978) – NASA astronaut, first American woman to walk in space
- Ban Tsui (Dip. Eng., BSc, MSc, MD) – described the Tsui Test and developed a catheter over needle kit for peripheral nerve block
- Christopher D. Brown (PhD 1996) - Co-founder of 908 Devices, company to invent the first handheld Mass Spectrometer
- Mary Anne White, O.C. – multi-award-winning materials scientist and educator

=== Government and politics ===
==== Prime Ministers ====
- Frank Bainimarama – Prime Minister of Fiji
- Richard Bedford Bennett – 11th Prime Minister of Canada; only Canadian prime minister raised to the English peerage as 1st Viscount Bennett
- Joe Clark – 16th Prime Minister of Canada
- Brian Mulroney (law, continued at Université Laval) – 18th Prime Minister of Canada

==== Lieutenant Governors ====
- Myra Freeman, O.NS – philanthropist, Lieutenant Governor of Nova Scotia
- Clarence Gosse, O.C. – 24th Lieutenant Governor of Nova Scotia
- Arthur Maxwell House, O.C. – neurologist and former Lieutenant-Governor of Newfoundland and Labrador
- Henry Poole MacKeen, O.C. – 22nd Lieutenant Governor of Nova Scotia
- John Robert Nicholson, OBE – businessman, politician and Lieutenant Governor of British Columbia
- Fabian O'Dea – Lieutenant Governor of Newfoundland and Labrador
- Albert Walsh – chief justice and first Lieutenant Governor for Newfoundland

==== Diplomats ====
- Kishore Mahbubani – Former President of the United Nations Security Council and Ambassador of the Republic of Singapore to the United Nations, Dean of the Lee Kuan Yew School of Public Policy at National University of Singapore (NUS)
- Audri Mukhopadhyay – Canadian Diplomat and economist

==== Premiers ====
- Allan Emrys Blakeney – tenth Premier of Saskatchewan
- John Buchanan – 20th Premier of Nova Scotia, senator
- Alex Campbell – 23rd Premier of Prince Edward Island
- Amor De Cosmos – 2nd Premier of British Columbia
- Darrell Dexter – 27th Premier of Nova Scotia
- Joseph Atallah Ghiz – 27th Premier of Prince Edward Island and former Dean of Dalhousie Law School
- John Hamm – 25th Premier of Nova Scotia
- Richard Bennett Hatfield – former Premier of New Brunswick
- Angus Lewis MacDonald (1921) – 13th Premier of Nova Scotia
- Russell MacLellan – 24th Premier of Nova Scotia
- Jim Prentice – 16th Premier of Alberta, federal cabinet minister
- Gerald Regan (1952) – former Liberal Premier of Nova Scotia
- Robert Stanfield – Premier of Nova Scotia and leader of the Federal Progressive Conservatives
- Danny Williams – 9th Premier of Newfoundland and Labrador

==== Other notable politicians and political actors ====
- Abdullah bin Abdulaziz Al Rabiah – Saudi Health Minister and pediatric surgeon
- Chris Axworthy – professor and Federal NDP politician
- Jamie Baillie – former Credit Union Atlantic CEO, leader of the Progressive Conservative Party of Nova Scotia
- Frank Bainimarama – military dictator of Fiji
- Dominic Cardy – leader, New Brunswick New Democratic Party
- Ches Crosbie – Rhodes Scholar 1976, NL Leader of the Opposition
- John Crosbie – former Canadian Minister of Finance, current Lieutenant Governor of Newfoundland and Labrador
- David Charles Dingwall (B.Comm 1974, LL.B. 1979) – former Liberal cabinet minister
- Peter MacKay – Minister of National Defense
- Judy Manning – former cabinet Minister, Newfoundland and Labrador
- Stewart McInnes (1961) – former Conservative Cabinet Minister
- Anne McLellan, O.C. – law professor and former Liberal deputy Prime Minister
- Christine Melnick – provincial NDP cabinet minister, Manitoba
- Reid Morden – former Canadian Security Intelligence Service director
- Cristelle Pratt – Assistant Secretary-General for the Environment and Climate Action, Organisation of African, Caribbean and Pacific States
- Gerald Regan – former Liberal cabinet minister
- Sidney Smith – president of University of Toronto, Conservative Party Secretary of State for External Affairs
- Graham Steele (1989) – Minister of Finance of Nova Scotia, Member of the Nova Scotia Legislature

==== Mayors ====
- William G. Adams – former mayor of St. John's, Newfoundland
- Peter J. Kelly – former mayor of the Halifax Regional Municipality, Nova Scotia
- John W. Morgan – former mayor of the Cape Breton Regional Municipality, Nova Scotia
- Mike Savage – mayor of the Halifax Regional Municipality, Nova Scotia

=== Academia ===
- Stephen Blackwood – President of Ralston College
- Philip Bryden – Dean of Law at University of New Brunswick (2004–2009) and University of Alberta (2009–)
- Robert MacGregor Dawson – political scientist
- Elizabeth Rollins Epperly – author and former president of the University of Prince Edward Island
- Howard Epstein (LL.B. 1973, faculty) – MLA for Halifax Chebucto
- Edgar Gold O.C. – expert in international ocean law and marine and environmental policy
- T. A. Goudge – philosopher
- Colleen Hanycz – President of La Salle University
- Donald Olding Hebb – father of modern neuropsychology
- Albert Ross Hill – president of the University of Missouri (1908–21)
- Peter Hochachka (MS), O.C. – professor and zoologist
- George Laurence – nuclear physicist
- Ronald St. John Macdonald (B. Law 1952), O.C. – law professor and international law expert
- Hugh MacLennan, O.C., O.Q. – author and professor
- Lynn McBain, professor of general practice in New Zealand
- H. R. Milner (B.Law 1911) – lawyer, businessman, and former Chancellor of University of King's College
- Moses Morgan (B.A.) – former president of Memorial University of Newfoundland
- Alvin Shrier (Ph.D.) – professor of physiology and Hosmer Chair in Physiology at McGill University

=== Business ===
- Frank Manning Covert, CBE, O.C. – lawyer and businessperson
- Purdy Crawford, O.C. (LL.B. 1955) – corporate director, former CEO of Imasco
- Graham Day (LLB 1956, LLD 1987) – former chairman of Cadbury Schweppes plc, Hydro One, as well as CEO of British Shipbuilders and the Rover Group
- James Hamet Dunn – major Canadian financier and industrialist
- Sean Durfy (B.Comm 1989) – President and CEO of WestJet
- Fred Fountain – lawyer, businessman, philanthropist, and Member of the Order of Canada
- Andrew Kam (B.Comm 1984, MBA 1986) – former CEO of Hong Kong Disneyland
- Charles Peter McColough – CEO of Xerox
- Denis Stairs, B.Eng. OBE – Canadian engineer and businessman
- Maury Van Vliet, O.C. – president and CEO of the 1978 Commonwealth Games

=== Law and lawmaking ===
==== Justices ====
- Joseph Andrew Chisholm, KBE – former Mayor of Halifax and Chief Justice of the Supreme Court of Nova Scotia
- Lorne Clarke – former Chief Justice of the Supreme Court of Nova Scotia
- John Doull – Justice of the Supreme Court of Canada, also provincial politician
- Constance Glube (1955) – former Chief Justice of Nova Scotia, first female Chief Justice of Canada
- Alexander Hickman, O.C. (1947) – Supreme Court of Newfoundland as Chief Justice
- Leslie M. Little (1961) – co-founding partner of Thorsteinssons; Justice of the federal Tax Court of Canada
- John Keiller MacKay, O.C. (1922) – former judge of Supreme Court of Ontario and Lieutenant Governor of Ontario
- Valerie Miller (1985) – Justice of the Tax Court of Canada
- Edmund Leslie Newcombe (B.A. 1878, M.A. 1881, faculty) – Justice of the Supreme Court of Canada
- Roland Ritchie, C.C. (part-time faculty) – Justice of the Supreme Court of Canada
- Eugene Rossiter (1978) – Associate Chief Judge, Tax Court of Canada
- Jamie Saunders (1973) – Justice of the Nova Scotia Provincial Court of Appeal
- Robert Sedgewick – Justice of the Supreme Court of Canada
- Clyde Wells (1962) – provincial Chief Justice of the Court of Appeal and 5th Premier of Newfoundland and Labrador
- Bertha Wilson, O.C. – first woman Justice of the Supreme Court of Canada

==== Attorneys General ====
- Murdoch MacPherson – Attorney-General of Saskatchewan
- Geoff Plant (LL.B. 1981) – Attorney General of British Columbia

==== Legislators ====
- Scott Brison – Member of Parliament, former Liberal cabinet minister
- T.J. Burke – provincial politician, New Brunswick
- Gerry Byrne – Member of Parliament
- Terry Donahoe – MLA and leader of the provincial Progressive Conservatives
- Andy Fillmore – incumbent Member of Parliament for Halifax
- George Furey – senator representing Newfoundland Labrador
- Danny Graham – former leader of the Liberal Party of Nova Scotia
- Henry Hicks – Senator
- Michael J. L. Kirby – former federal politician and current senator for Nova Scotia
- Megan Leslie (LLB 2004) – Member of Parliament for Halifax
- Finlay MacDonald, O.C. – senator representing Halifax, Nova Scotia
- John MacEachern – politician, member of the Nova Scotia House of Assembly
- Donald Oliver (LL.B. 1964, faculty) – first black male Canadian Senator
- Calvin Ruck, O.C. – activist and senator
- Russell Trood – Liberal Party senator for the state of Queensland, Australia

=== Activists ===
- Jan Crull Jr. (BA) – attorney, consultant, former Native American rights advocate, filmmaker, and investment banker
- Peter Dalglish (Law) – international children's rights activist; founded Toronto-based Street Kids International
- Elizabeth May (LLB 1983) – President of the Sierra Club of Canada, leader of the Green Party of Canada
- Alexa McDonough (BA 1965) – former leader of the New Democratic Party
- Nick Wright (MBA, Law) – founding leader of the Green Party of Nova Scotia

=== Journalism ===
- Jeff Douglas (BSc 1993) – CBC radio personality
- Patrick Graham journalist and screenwriter
- Sandra Gwyn, O.C. – journalist and writer
- Ian Hanomansing (Law) – television journalist
- Armand Leroi (BS1989) – evolutionary developmental biologist, author, and BBC documentarist
- Amber MacArthur (BA) – television and netcasting personality
- Robert MacNeil – broadcast journalist; co-anchored the nightly The MacNeil/Lehrer Report on PBS
- Marjorie Willison – CBC radio personality

=== Literature ===
- Ernest Buckler – novelist
- Jaime Burnet – novelist
- George Elliot Clarke – author and recipient of the Governor General's Award
- Simon Gray – English playwright, Commander of the Order of the British Empire
- Kenneth Leslie – poet
- Lucy Maud (L.M.) Montgomery – author of Anne of Green Gables (attended 1895, 1896)
- André Narbonne – author
- James Macdonald Oxley (BA 1874) – lawyer, author
- Robin Sharma – author
- Maxine Tynes – poet, also served on the Dalhousie Board of Governors (1986–1994)
- Budge Wilson – author
- Lance Woolaver – author, playwright and director

=== Performing arts ===
- Nobu Adilman (BA 1995) – musician and television personality*
- Kiran Ahluwalia – Songlines Music Award-winning singer
- Maureen Batt – concert and opera artist
- Jeremy Dutcher – classically trained Canadian Indigenous tenor, composer, musicologist,
- Jay Ferguson – musician for rock group Sloan
- Barbara Fris – operatic soprano
- Peter Herrndorf, O.C. – president and CEO of the National Arts Centre
- Shaun Majumder – actor/comedian
- Kate Maki – singer-songwriter
- Chris Murphy – bassist and vocalist of rock group Sloan
- Oopali Operajita, (MA, 1981) – choreographer and classical Indian danseuse; Distinguished Fellow, Carnegie Mellon University
- Candy Palmater (LL.B. 1999) – comedian, activist, writer, and radio-television personality
- Patrick Pentland – musician for rock group Sloan
- Raylene Rankin – singer
- Mary Vingoe (BA, 1976) – playwright, theatre director, Member of the Order of Canada

=== Sports ===
- Chris Bumstead – six-time Classic Physique Mr. Olympia, keg stand champion at Darren's house
- Mark de Jonge – Olympic bronze medal paddler and world record holder
- Simon Farine – basketball player who currently plays for Ironi Kiryat Ata of the Israeli Premier League
- Kamylle Frenette – paratriathlete
- Stephen Giles – Olympic silver medal paddler
- Colleen Jones – CBC broadcaster, world champion curler
- Cary Kaplan (MBA 1994) – founder of Cosmos Sports, president/GM Brampton Beast (ECHL) & Hamilton Bulldogs (AHL), CRO Global T20 Cricket
- Mike Malott – mixed martial artist who competes in the Welterweight division of the UFC
- Michael Scarola – world championship bronze medalist paddler

=== Other ===
- Carol Bélanger – architect
- Alex Cameron – Anglican bishop and son of Sandy Cameron
- Michael Donovan – film producer, screenwriter, co-founder of Salter Street Films
- Omar Gandhi – architect
- Sarah Jackson – artist
- John Norman Maclean – Presbyterian minister, father of Norman Maclean, and character is several of his books
- Lesra Martin – lawyer and motivational speaker
- Nick Eh 30 – gaming YouTuber and streamer
- Michel Trudeau – son of Prime Minister Pierre Trudeau

== Administration ==
=== Presidents ===
Presidents of Dalhousie University
	Name	Start of term	End of term	Notes
1	Thomas McCulloch	1838	1843	
University was closed from 1843 to 1863
2	James Ross	1863	1885	
3	John Forrest	1885	1911	
4	Arthur Stanley Mackenzie	1911	1931	
5	Carleton Wellesley Stanley	1931	1945	
6	Alexander Enoch Kerr	1945	1963	
7	Henry Hicks	1963	1980	
8	William Andrew MacKay	1980	1986	
9	Howard Charles Clark	1986	1995	
10	Tom Traves	1995	2013	
11	Richard Florizone	2013	2019	Florizone announced plans to resign in 2019. He has a Ph.D. in nuclear physics from MIT.
12	Deep Saini	2020	2023	
13	Kim Brooks	2023	present	

=== Chancellors ===
Chancellors of Dalhousie University
	Name	Start of term	End of term	Notes
1	C. D. Howe	1957	1960	
Position vacant from 1960 to 1968
2	Marcia Anastasia Christoforides	1968	1990	
3	H. Reuben Cohen	1990	1994	
4	Graham Day	1994	2001	
5	Richard Goldbloom	2001	2008	
6	Fred Fountain	2008	2015	
7	Anne McLellan	2015	present	McLellan is the ninth Deputy Prime Minister of Canada.

== Notable faculty ==
- A. H. Armstrong – classicist
- Peter Aucoin – political science, public administration
- Said Awad – Professor Emeritus of Urology
- Jerome H. Barkow – anthropologist
- Axel D. Becke – chemist
- Michael Bishop – literary scholar
- Edward Blackadder – Professor of Medical Jurisprudence
- John Cameron, FRSE – Professor of Anatomy
- Lesley Choyce – author
- James De Mille – Professor of English and Rhetoric
- Ford Doolittle – biochemist
- James Doull – philosopher, Professor of Classics
- OmiSoore Dryden – James R. Johnston Chair in Black Canadian Studies
- John Forrest – Professor of History
- Edgar Z. Friedenberg – educationist
- John Godfrey – historian
- Clarence Gosse – Professor of Urology
- George Grant – philosopher
- Shauntay Grant – author
- Roy Martin Haines – historian
- Brian K. Hall – biologist
- William Hare – Professor of Education and Philosophy
- C. D. Howe – engineer, businessman, Liberal Cabinet minister
- Erin Johnson – chemist
- Michael John Keen – Department of Geology professor (1961–77) and department chairman
- Thomas Worrall Kent – Dean of Administrative Studies, adjunct professor of Public Administration
- George Lawson – botanist
- Alexander H. Leighton – psychiatrist
- Roy Leitch – English composition
- Charles Macdonald – Professor of Mathematics
- Brian Mackay-Lyons – architect
- Arthur Stanley Mackenzie – physicist
- Christine Macy – architect, historian and the dean of the architecture and planning faculty
- Elisabeth Mann-Borgese – Professor of Law
- Daniel Murray – mathematician
- Cynthia Neville – historian
- Lars Osberg – McCulloch Professor of Economics
- E. C. Pielou – ecologist
- Robert Rosen – Professor of Biophysics
- Malcolm Ross – literary critic
- Sara Seck, Professor of Environmental Law
- Eric Segelberg – Professor of Classics
- Wilfred Cantwell Smith – Professor of Religion
- Colin Starnes – professor, author and former President of the University of King's College
- Keith R. Thompson – professor; Department of Oceanography; Department of Mathematics and Statistics
- Steve Tittle – composer
- Peter Busby Waite – historian, longtime Thomas McCulloch Professor of History
- Richard Wassersug – Professor of Anatomy and Neurobiology
- John Clarence Webster – Governor of Dalhousie University in 1934
- Richard Chapman Weldon – Professor of Law
- Franklin White – Professor and Head, Community Health and Epidemiology (1982–89); adjunct since 1989
- Boris Worm – marine ecologist
