= Schulich School of Law =

Law school, Dalhousie University, Halifax, Nova Scotia, Canada

Coordinates: 44°38′13″N 63°35′30″W

- Crest of the Schulich School of Law
- Motto: Lex Fons Lucis (Latin for 'Law Is the Source of Light')
- Parent school: Dalhousie University
- Established: 30 October 1883; 143 years ago
- School type: Public law school
- Parent endowment: C$1.0074 billion (2025)
- Dean: Sarah Harding
- Location: Halifax, Nova Scotia, Canada
- Enrollment: 500
- Faculty: 119
- Website: www.dal.ca/faculty/law.html

The Schulich School of Law is the law school of Dalhousie University in Halifax, Nova Scotia, Canada. Founded in 1883 as Dalhousie Law School, it is the oldest university-based common law school in Canada. It adopted its current name in October 2009 after receiving a $20-million endowment from Canadian businessman and philanthropist Seymour Schulich.

Today, the Schulich School of Law is the largest law school in Atlantic Canada, with 500 students enrolled each year (170 in first-year) and a faculty of Rhodes, Fulbright, and Trudeau scholars.

== History ==
The Dalhousie Law School was founded by an 1883 endowment by George Munro for a chair in constitutional and international law at Dalhousie University. Munro proposed Richard Chapman Weldon to lead the new faculty, at a salary of $2,000. Chapman was Professor of Mathematics at Mount Allison, and had been educated at Yale and Heidelberg.

Though Munro's endowment would not fund further professorships, it would allow a group of lawyers and judges to receive a $100 annual stipend for lecturing to Dalhousie's students. Further donations from other benefactors allowed the university to secure 2,800 books for its library.

The school was initially housed in two large ground-floor rooms of the Halifax Academy. Two years later, Weldon and a friend, Benjamin Russell, personally bought the late Sir Brenton Halliburton's house on Morris Street, which housed the law school until 1887.

== Ethos ==
Weldon emphasised the responsibility that lawyers had to contribute to public service:

In drawing up our curriculum we have not forgotten the duty which every university owes to the state, the duty which Aristotle saw and emphasized so long ago, of teaching the young men the science of government. In our free government we all have political duties some higher, some humbler… We may fairly hope that some of our students will, in their riper years be called upon to discharge public duties. We aim to help these to act with fidelity and wisdom.

Weldon aspired to treat the study of law as a full-time, liberal education. It was not, as Osgoode Hall was, an outpost for the province's professional law society where law was seen as "merely a technical craft", nor did it follow the expectation of legal training that was dominant in French-Canadian universities. Thus, the founding of the Dalhousie Law School was experimental and innovative in Canadian law. Indeed, the establishment of a university common law school was so radical – and its subsequent influence so great – that legal historians cite Dalhousie Law School as the basis for law school today.

In his Story of Legal Education in British Columbia, a book that chronicles the establishment of the University of British Columbia Faculty of Law sixty-two years after Dalhousie Law School first opened, W. Wesley Pue writes:

"Dalhousie" serves as a sort of code-word among legal educators in Canada, much as "Harvard" does in the United States of America. It invokes a vision of intellectually ambitious, rigorous, and scholarly approaches to education for the profession of law. In British Columbia, the transformation from part-time to full-time study involved the implementation of a model of legal education that was "Dalhousie" in all respects.

In discussing the motivations that led to the establishment of a full-time common law school, Weldon described the "'legitimate ambition' of 'generous spirits who wish their country well' to build a law school 'that shall influence the intellectual life of Canada as Harvard and Yale have influenced the intellectual life of New England.'"

Based on Weldon's comments in his inaugural address at the opening of the law school, it's unsurprising that the Schulich School of Law has shared a storied connection with Harvard University. Although Dalhousie was influenced early on by the Harvard Law School, it placed a decidedly unique emphasis on the subjects of public law, constitutional history, and international law, fields that were notably absent from Harvard's curriculum in the 1880s.

== Reputation ==
University rankings

World rankings

Canadian rankings

The school was ranked in the top three Canadian law schools in Corporate Knights' 2011 Knight Schools Survey. Maclean's 2013 ranking of Canadian common law schools placed the school sixth out of 16. The Schulich School of Law was also the first Canadian law school awarded the Emil Gumpuert Award by the American College of Trial Lawyers for trial advocacy training.

== Location ==
In 1966, the school moved to its current home, the Weldon Law Building, on Dalhousie's Studley Campus. On August 16, 1985, a lightning strike caused a short in Weldon's electrical system, which started a fire that destroyed most of the Sir James Dunn Law Library. The library reopened four years later in 1989.

Refurbishments to the Weldon Law Building took place in 2004 with the addition of the James and Barbara Palmer Wing and in 2016 with the Facade Renewal Project. In phases one and two of the Facade Renewal Project, windows were replaced, walls were insulated, and stonework was reinforced on the third and fourth floors of the building. In phases three and four, construction was focused on the building's first and second floors. Here, crews removed existing stonework, installed an accessible ramp to the school's entrance on University Avenue, and redid the school's front entrance.

Inside the building, the centre staircase that existed between the first and second floor has been removed to make way for the creation of modern administrative office space on the second floor to provide a new and improved area for the administrative staff. The faculty's mosaic laid initially at the top of the stairs on the second floor and which weighs close to 2,500 lbs. was preserved and laid outside of the new administrative space.

== Programs ==
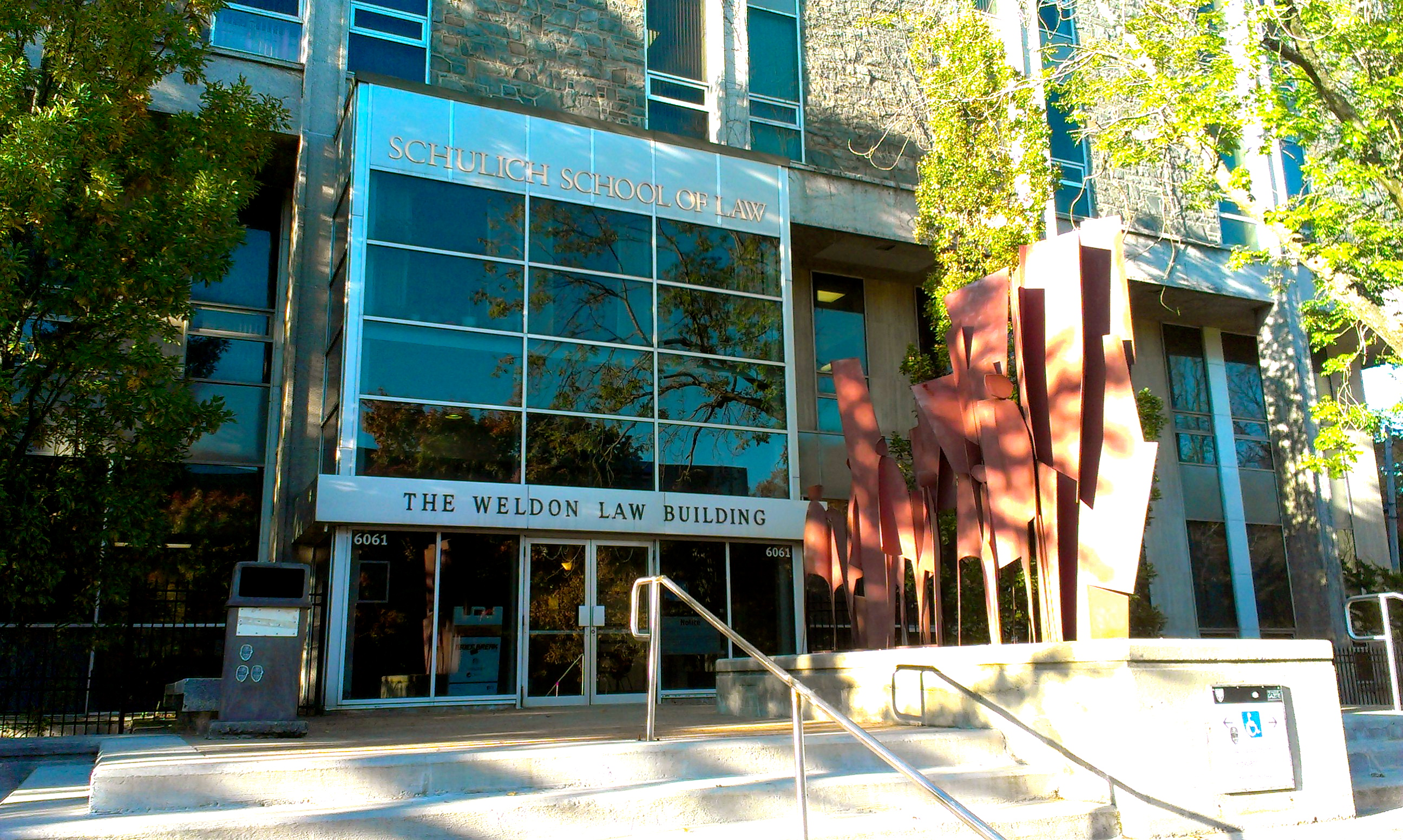
The Weldon Law Building, Dalhousie University

In January 2011, the Senate voted to change Dalhousie's law degree designation from a Bachelor of Laws (LLB) to a Juris Doctor (JD). Students attending the Schulich School of Law today can undertake a regular JD degree or concentrate their JD in one of four specific areas: health law, business law/corporate law, marine and environmental law, and law and technology.

The school also offers a variety of combined-degree programs for undergraduate students:

- JD/MBA (Master of Business Administration)
- JD/MPA (Master of Public Administration)
- JD/MI (Master of Information)
- JD/MHA (Master of Health Administration)
- JD/MJ (Master of Journalism). The JD/MJ combination is the first of its kind in Canada.

The Schulich School of Law also gives 20 to 30 aspiring professors and jurists who wish to enhance their knowledge of law and specialize in a particular areas/areas of law the option to pursue a postgraduate degree at the school:

- LLM (Master of Laws)
- PhD (Doctor of Philosophy)
- MEC (Master of Electronic Commerce)
- Interdisciplinary PhD program

As an accredited law school in Canada, graduates are eligible to proceed to bar admission and articling programs throughout the country. Further information on bar admission for accredited Canadian law school graduates and the National Committee on Accreditation (NCA) for foreign-trained law graduates is available at the Federation of Law Societies of Canada website.

== Admissions ==
At the Schulich School of Law, GPAs are weighed at 60 per cent and LSAT scores at 40 per cent. In 2016, 170 students were admitted from a pool of over 1,300 applicants, of which 55 per cent were women and 45 per cent men. The average age of applicants was 25. The Schulich School of Law's two application deadlines are 30 November and 28 February.

== Indigenous Blacks & Mi'kmaq Initiative ==
The Indigenous Blacks & Mi'kmaq (IB&M) Initiative at the Schulich School of Law was established in 1989 to increase the representation of these community members in the legal profession. The initiative develops scholarships in the areas of Aboriginal and African Canadian legal perspectives, promotes the hiring and retention of graduates, and provides eligible students with financial and other types of support.

== Areas of expertise ==
- Marine and environmental law
- Law and technology
- Cyberbullying
- Health law and Health policy
- Business law: Corporate Law and Commercial Law
- Corporate Theory
- Corporate Governance
- E-Commerce
- Fiduciary law
- Tax law
- Intellectual Property law
- Constitutional law
- Charter of Rights and Freedoms
- Canadian Aboriginal law
- Family law
- Food law
- Labour law
- Feminist Legal Theory
- Human rights law
- International law
- Comparative law
- Legal ethics
- Jurisprudence
- Mental health law
- Restorative justice
- Trust Law
- Equity law

== Research institutes ==
The law school is home to the Dalhousie Health Justice Institute, the Law and Technology Institute, and the Marine and Environmental Law Institute.

=== Marine and Environmental Law Institute ===
The Marine and Environmental Law Institute directs the academic specialization for the Marine & Environmental Law Program (MELP). In addition to its publication activities, the Institute provides advisory services to agencies around the world.

=== Law and Technology Institute ===
Core curriculum and course offerings include Biotechnology, Internet law, Privacy Law, Electronic Commerce, Intellectual Property, and the Commercialization of Research.

=== Dalhousie Health Justice Institute ===
The Schulich School of Law's interdisciplinary Health Justice Institute works alongside Dalhousie's Faculties of Medicine, Health Professions, and Dentistry.

== Dalhousie Legal Aid Service ==
The Dalhousie Legal Aid Service was founded in 1970. It provides legal services to the Halifax area and brings together third-year law students, practising lawyers, and community actors. It is the oldest clinical law program in Canada and the only community law clinic in Nova Scotia. Students can receive academic credit and gain practical legal experience through the Legal Aid Service, which emphasizes the development of professional skills and the refinement of substantive and procedural knowledge in a real-life context.

== Student life ==
=== Domus Legis Society ===
Law student life at Dalhousie is known for its collegiality and tradition. The student-run Domus Legis Society (better known as Domus Legis) was founded in 1965 and is Canada's oldest social society for law students. ("Domus Legis" is derived from Latin and means "House of Law.") It was created by Dalhousie law students "to promote good fellowship among congenial men and women at the Faculty of Law of Dalhousie University; to encourage a high standard of professional work; and to assist by every honourable means the advancement of its members."

Domus Legis functions independently from the university administration and receives support from alumni and Canadian law firms. The society adheres to a constitution and is run by an annually elected executive of students from the Faculty of Law. Despite its independence, Domus Legis has close customary ties to faculty, alumni, visiting justices, and the Dean, who is given honorary designation as Member #1.

Over the years, traditions have grown to include the customary signing of the Domus Legis Society's walls by law graduates and visiting dignitaries. The last of this tradition is proudly displayed in the Weldon Law building student lounge with the signature "Homeless Class of 2005." The original building that housed the society was located at 1255 Seymour St., which was demolished in January 2004.

Despite their headquarters' demolition, Domus Legis's traditions live on in the weekly Domus Night, which takes place every Thursday, and the annual Halloween party, which attracts law students and members of other faculties. Efforts to acquire a new home for Domus Legis continue along with alumni support. Domus Legis membership is open to all Schulich School of Law students.

=== Dalhousie Law Students' Society ===
The Dalhousie Law Students' Society (LSS) is the elected student government of the Schulich School of Law. It is composed of seven executive members, with representatives from each section in first year, three representatives each from second and third year, a Black students' representative, an Aboriginal students' representative, a chair, and a secretary. The society represents the student voice in all aspects of the law school, including social, financial, athletic, and academic.

=== Dalhousie Journal of Legal Studies ===
The Dalhousie Journal of Legal Studies (DJLS) is a non-profit academic law journal that publishes work from current law students and recent alumni. Established in 1991, the DJLS promotes reflection and debate on contemporary legal issues. As one of the only publications of its kind in Canada, the journal serves as a unique vehicle for law students to publish their work. The DJLS is published once per academic year and maintains a broad subscription base that includes law firms, law school libraries, corporations, government departments, alumni, and legal professionals from around the globe. It is also indexed in the HeinOnline database.

An entirely student-run publication, the DJLS is managed by an editorial board. More than 70 student volunteers assist in its production and publication. It is distinct from the Dalhousie Law Journal, a peer-reviewed publication produced by Schulich School of Law faculty members.

=== The Weldon Times ===
The Weldon Times is a law student-run newspaper established in 1972. They publish articles focused on life in the law school, community, and legal profession.

The Weldon Times maintains a print and digital distribution of issues, which are now released as quarterly magazines. Digital copies of the latest issues can be found at www.TheWeldonTimes.com

== Notable alumni ==
The Schulich School of Law at Dalhousie University has produced a number of accomplished alumni over the course of its history, including over 300 judicial appointments to every level of court in every province of Canada. The law school's alumni, for example, constitute 20 per cent of the Federal Court of Canada and 25 per cent of the Tax Court of Canada.

Notable alumni include:

=== Prime ministers ===
- Rt. Hon. Richard Bedford Bennett (1893) – 11th prime minister of Canada; only Canadian prime minister raised to the English peerage as 1st Viscount Bennett
- Rt. Hon. Brian Mulroney (finished first year but completed studies at Université Laval) – 18th Prime Minister of Canada
- Rt. Hon. Joe Clark (finished first year but left to pursue freelance journalism in British Columbia) – 16th Prime Minister of Canada

=== Justices of the Supreme Court of Canada ===
- Hon. Edmund Leslie Newcombe – Puisne Justice of the Supreme Court of Canada
- Roland Ritchie, CC – Puisne Justice of the Supreme Court of Canada
- Robert Sedgewick – Puisne Justice of the Supreme Court of Canada
- Bertha Wilson (1957), OC – first female Justice of the Supreme Court of Canada

=== Justices of international courts ===
- Ronald St. John MacDonald, OC (1952) – law professor and international law expert; only non-European ever appointed as a justice of the European Court of Human Rights; Honorary Professor of Law at China's Peking University
- John Erskine Read, OC (1909) – law dean; international law scholar; only Canadian ever appointed as a justice of the International Court of Justice (served until 1958)

=== Other notable justices ===
- Sir Joseph Andrew Chisholm KBE (1886) – former mayor of Halifax; first Chief Justice of the Supreme Court of Nova Scotia; last judge to be knighted in Canada
- Constance Glube (1955) – former Chief Justice of Nova Scotia; first female Chief Justice in Canada
- Frederic William Howay FRSC (1890) – historian, lawyer, and jurist; "primary authority" on many aspects of B.C. history in the mid-20th century; today considered "father of the study of British Columbia's nautical history"
- William Andrew MacKay (1953) – former Justice of the Federal Court of Canada; Foreign Service Officer with the Department of External Affairs; and Ford Foundation Fellow at Harvard University
- John Keiller MacKay, OC (1922) – former judge of Supreme Court of Ontario; Lieutenant Governor of Ontario; awarded the Distinguished Service Order in 1916 for "conspicuous gallantry in action" in the Battle of the Somme
- Clyde Wells (1962) – Chief Justice of Newfoundland Court of Appeal; fifth Premier of Newfoundland and Labrador

=== Lawmakers / politicians ===
- Hon. Jim Cowan (1965) – Senator representing Nova Scotia and leader of the Liberals in the Senate
- Hon. John Crosbie (1956) – former Canadian Minister of Finance; former llieutenant-governor of Newfoundland and Labrador
- Mary Dawson (1970) - Conflict of Interest and Ethics Commissioner of Canada
- David Charles Dingwall (B.Comm 1974, LL.B. 1979) – former Liberal cabinet minister
- Hanson Dowell (1930), president of the Canadian Amateur Hockey Association and member of the Nova Scotia House of Assembly
- Howard Epstein (LL.B. 1973, faculty) – MLA for Halifax Chebucto
- Hon. George Furey (1983) – Senator representing Newfoundland and Labrador and Speaker of the Senate
- Danny Graham (1987) – former leader of the Liberal Party of Nova Scotia
- Megan Leslie (2004) – former Member of Parliament for Halifax
- Richard McBride, KCMG (1890) – lawyer; British Columbia politician; considered the founder of the British Columbia Conservative Party
- Hon. Peter MacKay (1991) – former Minister of National Defence; former Federal Justice Minister and Attorney General of Canada
- M.A. MacPherson (1913) – former Attorney-General of Saskatchewan
- Stewart McInnes (1961) – former Conservative cabinet minister
- Hon. Anne McLellan, OC (1974) – law professor and former Liberal deputy prime minister
- Peter Milliken, PC (1971) – lawyer; politician; served as Speaker of the House for 10 years beginning in 2001
- Reid Morden (1963) – former Canadian Security Intelligence Service director
- Hon. Donald Oliver (1964) – first black male Canadian Senator
- Hon. Erin O'Toole (2003) – former Leader of the Official Opposition in the House of Commons of Canada
- Geoff Plant (1981) – former Attorney General of British Columbia
- Hon. Geoff Regan, PC (1983) – Member of Parliament for Halifax West; Speaker of the House of Commons
- Hon. Gerald Regan (1954) – former Liberal cabinet minister
- Graham Steele (1989) – former Minister of Finance of Nova Scotia; Member of the Nova Scotia Legislature

=== Academics / scholars ===
- Innis H. Christie (1962) – law dean; one Canada's "great labour law scholars" and a central figure in the establishment of employment law in Canada.
- Meinhard Doelle (1990) – law scholar; drafter of the Environment Act of Nova Scotia
- Murray Fraser (1960) – law scholar; founding dean of University of Victoria Faculty of Law
- Edgar Gold, OC (1973) – Australian-Canadian expert in international ocean law and marine and environmental policy
- Vincent C MacDonald (1920) – law dean; academic; justice; a leading Canadian constitutional law scholar in the Post-War Period
- Elisabeth Mann-Borgese – internationally recognized expert on maritime law and policy; founding members of Club of Rome; a global think tank based in Zurich, Switzerland
- W. Kent Power, QC – founding chief lecturer at the University of Alberta Faculty of Law; first to advocate permanent law reform commissions in Canada; helped shape Western Canadian common law tradition
- Sidney Smith (1920) – law professor; law dean; president of University of Toronto; former secretary of state (external affairs); introduced Harvard case method into Canadian legal education
- Richard Chapman Weldon – professor of law; founding dean
- F. Scott Murray – law scholar and historian
- S. Michael Lynk – associate professor of law at Western University and the United Nations; special rapporteur on the Situation of Human Rights in the Palestinian Territories Occupied since 1967

=== Business / corporate law ===
- Henry Borden – corporate lawyer; founding partner of Toronto law firm Borden & Elliott (now Borden Ladner Gervais); nephew of Sir Robert Borden (eighth Prime Minister of Canada)
- Frank Manning Covert, OC, CBE (1929) – lawyer and businessman
- Purdy Crawford, OC (1955) – "dean emeritus of Canada's corporate [law] bar"; corporate director, former CEO of Imasco
- Sir Graham Day (1959) – former chairman of Cadbury Schweppes plc; Hydro One; CEO of British Shipbuilders and the Rover Group
- Sir James Hamet Dunn (1898) – major Canadian financier and industrialist
- Fred Fountain (1974) – lawyer; businessman; philanthropist; Member of the Order of Canada
- Leslie M. Little (1961) – co-founding partner of Thorsteinssons; Justice of the federal Tax Court of Canada
- H. R. Milner (1911) – lawyer; businessman; former chancellor of University of King's College
- James Palmer (1952) – founding partner of Burnett, Duckwoth & Palmer
- James McGregor Stewart (1914) – founded Stewart McKelvey, Atlantic Canada's largest law firm; named one of Canada's ten greatest lawyers by Canadian Lawyer Magazine in 2001
- Hugh H. Turnbull – chairman and managing director, The Hathaway Corporation; former director of Corporate Finance and senior V.P. of Merrill Lynch Canada; chairman of the Members Organization Committee of the Toronto Stock Exchange
- Howard Wetston (1974) – current chair of the Ontario Securities Commission

=== Legal activists ===
- Rocky Jones (1992) – political activist in the areas of human rights, race and poverty
- Lesra Martin (1997) – Canadian lawyer; renowned for helping to secure the release of Rubin "Hurricane" Carter
- Elizabeth May (1983) – president of the Sierra Club of Canada; former leader of the Green Party of Canada
- Candy Palmater (1999) – comedian; activist; writer; and radio-television personality
- Pamela Palmater (1999) – Mi'kmaq lawyer; professor; activist; named among the 25 most influential lawyers by Canadian Lawyer Magazine
- Henry Sylvester Williams – Trinidadian lawyer and writer; most noted for conceiving / founding the Pan-African Movement; named 16th on a recent list of the 100 Great Black Britons
- Nick Wright (2007) – founding leader of the Green Party of Nova Scotia

=== Premiers ===
- Allan Emrys Blakeney (1947) – tenth Premier of Saskatchewan
- John Buchanan (1958) – 20th Premier of Nova Scotia; senator
- Alex Campbell (1959) – 23rd Premier of Prince Edward Island
- Hon. Darrell Dexter (1987) – 27th Premier of Nova Scotia
- Joseph Atallah Ghiz – 27th Premier of Prince Edward Island and former Dean of Dalhousie Law School
- Richard Bennett Hatfield (1956) – former Premier of New Brunswick
- Angus Lewis MacDonald (1921) – 13th Premier of Nova Scotia
- Russell MacLellan (1965) – 24th Premier of Nova Scotia
- Tom Marshall (1972) – 11th Premier of Newfoundland and Labrador
- Hon. Jim Prentice (1980) – Federal Conservative cabinet minister; 16th Premier of Alberta
- Gerald Regan (1952) – former Liberal Premier of Nova Scotia
- Danny Williams (1972) – 9th Premier of Newfoundland and Labrador
- Clyde Wells (1962) – provincial Chief Justice of the Court of Appeal and 5th Premier of Newfoundland and Labrador
- David Eby (2005) – 37th premier of British Columbia

=== Lieutenant-governors ===
- Henry Poole MacKeen, OC (1921) – 22nd lieutenant-governor of Nova Scotia
- Sir John Robert Nicholson, OBE – businessman; politician and 21st lieutenant-governor of British Columbia
- Sir Albert Walsh – chief justice; first lieutenant-governor for Newfoundland

=== Diplomats ===
- Michael Leir (1974) – Canadian High Commissioner to Australia

=== Arts and pop culture ===
- Mark Sakamoto (2003) - author of Forgiveness, A Gift from my Grandparents, published by HarperCollins, June 2014 and winner of Canada Reads 2018.
- Barrie Dunn (1998) – actor; writer; producer best known for playing Ray in the Canadian mockumentary television program Trailer Park Boys
- Ian Hanomansing (1986) – Canadian Broadcasting Corporation journalist and anchorman

== List of deans ==
- Sarah Harding (2023-Present)
- Camille Cameron, KC (2021–23)
- Richard Devlin (acting Dean, 2020-21)
- Camille Cameron, QC (2015–20)
- Kim Brooks, (2010–15)
- Phillip Saunders, QC (2005–10)
- Dawn Russell, QC (1995–96 acting Dean, 1996–2005)
- Hon. Joseph Ghiz, QC, (1993–95)
- Philip Girard (1991–93, acting Dean)
- Innis M Christie, QC (1985–91)
- William H Charles, QC (1979–85)
- Ronald St. John Macdonald QC, CC (1972–79)
- Murray Fraser, QC (1971–72, acting Dean)
- William Andrew MacKay, QC (1964–69)
- Vincent C MacDonald, QC (1934–50)
- Sidney Earle Smith, PC (1929–34)
- John Erskine Read (1924–29)
- Donald Alexander MacRae, KC (1914–24)
- Richard Chapman Weldon, QC (1883–1914)

== See also ==
- List of law schools in Canada
- Seymour Schulich
