= Lavanya Rajamani =

Indian lawyer, author, and professor

- Education: National Law School (BA, LLB); Hertford College, Oxford (BCL, DPhil); Yale University (LLM)
- Occupations: Lawyer, Academic
- Employer: University of Oxford
- Known for: International Climate Change Law; International Environmental Law; Common But Differentiated Responsibilities
- Honours: Rhodes Scholarship (1996); Radhakrishnan Memorial Bequest (2002); ASIL Certificate of Merit (2018)

Lavanya Rajamani is an Indian lawyer and academic whose area of expertise is international climate change law, public international law, and environmental law and policy. She is currently a professor of International Environmental Law at the Faculty of Law, University of Oxford, a Yamani Fellow in Public International Law at St Peter's College, Oxford.

She is amongst the most prominent scholars in the field of international environmental law and has been considered to be "one of the biggest names" in the field. She is also the youngest Indian academic to be invited to offer a course in public international law at the Hague Academy of International Law in the Netherlands.

== Education ==
Rajamani completed her undergraduate degree in law at the National Law School of India University in 1996. She then completed her Bachelor of Civil Law (BCL) from the University of Oxford in 1997 as a Rhodes scholar. In 1998, she completed her Master of Laws (LLM) from Yale University, following which she went on the complete her Doctor of Philosophy (D.Phil.) from the University of Oxford in 2002. Her thesis on 'Differential Treatment in International Environmental Law' was published by Oxford University Press in 2006. Rajamani was also awarded a Doctor of Philosophy (Ph.D.) (By Incorporation Ad eundem degree) from the University of Cambridge in 2006.

== Career ==
Rajamani is currently a Professor of International Environmental Law at the University of Oxford and a Yamani Fellow in Public International Law at St. Peter's College, University of Oxford. Before coming to Oxford, she held a Professorship at the Centre for Policy Research in New Delhi. She has previously also been a Lecturer of Environmental Law, and a Fellow and Director of Studies in Law at Queens’ College, Cambridge, and a Junior Research Fellow in Public International Law at Worcester College, Oxford. Rajamani has held visiting positions and taught public international law, international climate change law, international environmental law, and human rights law at the Hague Academy of International Law, Ashoka University, Osaka Gakuin University, Aix-Marseille University, and University of Bologna.

Rajamani has made several important contributions to the international climate negotiations since 1998. Among other roles, she has served as a legal consultant to United Nations Framework Convention on Climate Change (UNFCCC) secretariat, as a negotiator for the Alliance of Small Island States, and as a legal adviser to the Chairs of Ad Hoc Working Groups under the UNFCCC. Rajamani has also actively participated in the negotiation and drafting of various landmark international environmental treaties such as the Paris Agreement. She played a key role in the drafting of the Paris Agreement where she was a member of its core drafting and advisory team, and was considered a key influential figure at the 2015 United Nations Climate Change Conference. Her expertise in these negotiations lie in drafting 'constructively ambiguous' provisions by innovating with the legal character of obligations to reflect political compromises and drive consensus.

She has advised governments and multilateral agencies, including the Danish Ministry of Climate Change, the UNDP, the World Bank, and the Indian Ministry of Environment and Forests. In 2018, the Government of Vanuatu appointed her Rajamani as External Counsel in relation to the landmark Climate Change Advisory Opinion before the International Court of Justice (ICJ). Rajamani has also served as the Coordinating Lead Author for the Intergovernmental Panel on Climate Change's Sixth Assessment Report and is a member of the influential Climate Crisis Advisory Group (CCAG).

In 2022, Rajamani delivered the Heilbron Lecture at the Old Bailey which is part of a lecture series championing female legal experts organized annually by First 100 Years. Baroness Hale - the former President of UK Supreme Court - delivered the closing remarks and described Rajamani's lecture as "truly inspiring."

== Research ==
Rajamani has published well over 100 journal articles and book chapters, 4 books, and 4 edited volumes. Her writings have been published in prestigious peer-reviewed international journals such International & Comparative Law Quarterly, International Affairs, European Journal of International Law, Climate Policy, Cambridge Journal of International Law and Theoretical Inquiries in Law. She is also amongst the most highly cited Indian international law scholars. Rajamani's research has significantly shaped the jurisprudence on international environmental law and has been referenced widely by international courts. For instance, her works were relied upon heavily by several parties before the ICJ in the Climate Change Advisory Opinion proceedings such as Australia, France, the United Kingdom and the IUCN. Rajamani's work on fairness justifications for nationally determined contributions was also relied upon centrally by claimants before the European Court of Human Rights including in the groundbreaking Klimaseniorennen case. Her research has also been instrumental in influencing domestic environmental law in India and has been referred to by the Supreme Court of India on multiple occasions.

She has co-authored and co-edited leading textbooks in international environmental law such as 'The Oxford Handbook of International Environmental Law' (co-authored with Jacqueline Peel; Oxford University Press, 2021) and 'International Climate Change Law' (co-edited with Daniel Bodansky and Jutta Brunnée; Oxford University Press, 2017). For the latter, she was awarded a Certificate of Merit for a specialized area of international law by the American Society of International Law in 2018.

Rajamani's course at the Hague Academy of International Law on 'Innovation and Experimentation in the International Climate Change Regime,' has been published as part of the Collected Courses of the Hague Academy of International Law/ Receuil des Cours in 2020. Her lecture on the ‘International Climate Change Regime: Evolution and Challenges’ features in the UN Audio Visual Library of International Law.

=== Books ===
- Lavanya Rajamani, Innovation and Experimentation in the International Climate Change Regime (Brill/Nijhoff, 2020)
- Daniel Bodansky, Jutta Brunnée and Lavanya Rajamani, International Climate Change Law (Oxford University Press, 2017) (Winner of the ASIL 2018 Certificate of Merit for a specialized area of international law)
- Siobhán McInerney-Lankford, Mac Darrow and Lavanya Rajamani, Human Rights and Climate Change (World Bank, 2011)
- Lavanya Rajamani, Differential Treatment in International Environmental Law (Oxford University Press, 2006)

=== Edited volumes ===
- Lavanya Rajamani and Jacqueline Peel, The Oxford Handbook of International Environmental Law (7th ed., Oxford University Press 2021)
- Jutta Brunnée, Meinhard Doelle and Lavanya Rajamani, Promoting Compliance in An Evolving Climate Regime (Cambridge University Press, 2012)
- Richard Lord, Silke Goldberg, Lavanya Rajamani and Jutta Brunnée, Climate Change Liability: Transnational Law and Practice (Cambridge University Press, 2012)
- Sandrine Maljean-Dubois and Lavanya Rajamani, Implementation of International Environmental Law (Brill, 2011)

=== Recent journal articles ===
- Lavanya Rajamani, 'The International Court of Justice on the Mitigation Obligations in the Paris Agreement’ [2026] Review of European, Comparative & International Environmental Law (RECIEL)
- Lavanya Rajamani and others, 'Legal guardrails on States’ dependence on carbon dioxide removal to meet climate targets’ [2026] Climate Policy
- John Knox, Daniel Bodansky and Lavanya Rajamani, 'The Trump Administration Steps Back from International Environmental Cooperation’ (2025) 119(4) American Journal of International Law 767
- Lavanya Rajamani, ‘Empowering International Law to Address Claims for Climate Reparations’ (2025) 119(3) American Journal of International Law 484
