= Howard Charles Clark =

New Zealand-born Canadian chemist and university administrator (1929–2024)

Howard Charles Clark FRSC FCIC

9th President and Vice-Chancellor of Dalhousie University
- In office 1986–1995
- Chancellor: Marcia Anastasia Christoforides; H. Reuben Cohen; Graham Day
- Preceded by: William Andrew MacKay
- Succeeded by: Tom Traves

Personal details
- Born: Howard Charles Clark; 4 September 1929 Auckland, New Zealand
- Died: 14 August 2024 (aged 94) Guelph, Ontario, Canada
- Scientific career
- Education: University of Auckland; University of Cambridge
- Fields: Inorganic chemistry
- Workplaces: University of British Columbia; University of Western Ontario; University of Guelph; Dalhousie University
- Doctoral advisors: Harry Julius Emeléus
- Notable students: Malcolm H. Chisholm (post doc)

Howard Charles Clark FRSC FCIC (4 September 1929 – 14 August 2024) was a Canadian chemist and university administrator.

Born in Auckland, New Zealand, Clark was educated at Takapuna Grammar School and received a Bachelor of Science degree in 1951, a Master of Science degree in 1952, and a PhD in 1954 from the University of Auckland. He then received a second PhD in 1958 from University of Cambridge. From 1954 to 1955, he was a lecturer at the University of Auckland. From 1955 to 1957, he was a Fellow at the University of Cambridge. He emigrated to Canada in 1957 as an assistant professor at the University of British Columbia. He became a full professor and remained at UBC until 1965, when he was appointed Head of Chemistry at the University of Western Ontario. During his time at UWO, he was an active scholar, with a focus on organoplatinum chemistry. From 1976 to 1986, he was Vice President Academic and a professor of chemistry at the University of Guelph. From 1986 to 1995, he was the 9th President of Dalhousie University as well as a professor of chemistry.

From 1983 to 1984, he was president of the Chemical Institute of Canada.

Clark died in Guelph on 14 August 2024, at the age of 94.

== Selected works ==
- Clark, Howard Charles (2003). Growth and governance of Canadian universities: An insider's view. Vancouver, British Columbia, Canada: University of British Columbia Press. ISBN 9780774810234.

Academic offices
Preceded by Andrew MacKay	9th President of Dalhousie University; 1986–1995	Succeeded by Tom Traves
