= Donald Bradley =

Donald Bradley may refer to:

- Donald Charlton Bradley (1924–2014), British inorganic chemist
- Don Bradley (1924–1997), English footballer
- Donald Bradley, President, Municipal Council of Newark, 1989–2006
