= Richard Devlin =

Richard Devlin may refer to:

- Richard Devlin (legal scholar) (born 1960), Canadian law professor
- Richard Devlin (politician) (born 1952), Oregon state senator
