= Sarah Harding (legal scholar) =

Sarah Harding is the Dean of the Schulich School of Law as well as Weldon Professor of Law at Dalhousie University. She was previously the Associate Dean for Faculty Development and Research at the Chicago-Kent College of Law.

== Education ==
Sarah Harding earned a BA from McGill University and her law degree from Dalhousie University in 1989. She received a Rhodes scholarship while studying at Dalhousie in 1988 and received a BCL from Oxford University, before completing her LLM at Yale Law School.

== Career ==
Sarah Harding was a professor of law at the Illinois Institute of Technology Chicago-Kent College of Law, where she taught Torts, Property Law, Comparative Constitutional Law, and Legal Philosophy. At Chicago-Kent, she also served as the Associate Dean for Faculty Development and Research, and developed the course Property Law and Social Conflict. She also served as the co-director of the Institute for Law and the Humanities.

In 2023 she was appointed the 17th Dean of the Schulich School of Law at her alma mater Dalhousie University, as well as the Weldon Professor of Law.

== Personal life ==
Harding was born in London, Ontario. Her grandfather was a clerk-treasurer of Sandwich East Township in Windsor, Ontario.

As of 2023, Harding lives in Halifax, and she has a partner and three children who she described as "predominantly creative types". She took up beekeeping as a hobby during the COVID-19 lockdowns of the early 2020s.
