= Alfred Carrothers =

President of the University of Calgary
- In office 1969–1974
- Preceded by: Herbert Stoker Armstrong
- Succeeded by: William Arthur Cochrane

Personal details
- Born: June 1, 1924 Saskatoon, Saskatchewan
- Died: May 4, 1998 (aged 73) Victoria, British Columbia
- Education: University of British Columbia; Harvard Law School
- Occupation: academic administrator, lawyer

Alfred William Rooke "Fred" Carrothers (June 1, 1924 – May 4, 1998) was a Canadian lawyer, arbitrator, and academic working in the field of law.

Born in Saskatoon, Saskatchewan, the son of W. A. Carrothers, a professor of economics at the University of Saskatchewan, Carrothers earned a Bachelor of Arts degree in 1947 and a Bachelor of Laws in 1948 as part of the first graduating class in law at the University of British Columbia. He received a Master of Laws degree in 1951 from the Harvard Law School and a Doctorate of Juridical Science in 1966. He was called to the Bars of British Columbia in 1948, of Ontario in 1965, and of Alberta in 1969.

He started his career as an academic at the University of British Columbia, where he was a lecturer from 1948 to 1950. He was an assistant professor at Dalhousie University from 1951 to 1952. In 1952, he joined the University of British Columbia as an assistant professor, becoming an associate professor in 1955, and a full professor in 1960. From 1960 to 1962, he was also director of the Institute for Industrial Relations. In 1964, he became dean and a professor of law at the University of Western Ontario. Carrothers was President of the University of Calgary from 1969 to 1974.

From 1974 to 1977, he was the founding president of the Institute for Research on Public Policy, Canada's oldest non-partisan public policy think tank. He was dean of the Common Law Section of the Faculty of Law at the University of Ottawa from 1981 to 1983.

In 1965 he was appointed by the government of Canada to head the Advisory Commission on the Development of Government in the Northwest Territories, which became known as the Carrothers Commission.

In 1956, while a law professor at University of British Columbia, he wrote The Labour Injunction in British Columbia. He was also the author of Labour Arbitration in Canada and co-author of Collective Bargaining Law in Canada.

Carrothers married Jane Macintosh Boyd in 1961, and they had three children, Matthew, Jonathan and Tasha. He died in Victoria, British Columbia in 1998 of complications following a stroke.
