= Norman Wagner =

Canadian archeologist (1935–2004)

Norman Ernest Wagner

President of the University of Calgary
- In office 1978–1988
- Preceded by: William Arthur Cochrane
- Succeeded by: Murray Fraser

Personal details
- Born: March 29, 1935 Edenwold, Saskatchewan
- Died: December 10, 2004 (aged 69) Calgary, Alberta

Norman Ernest Wagner, OC (March 29, 1935 – December 10, 2004) was a Canadian archeologist, professor and University president.

Born in Edenwold, Saskatchewan, Wagner received a Bachelor of Arts and Master of Divinities from the University of Saskatchewan in 1958, a Master of Arts in 1960 and PhD in Near Eastern Studies in 1965 from the University of Toronto.

== Career ==
From 1962 to 1978, Wagner taught Near Eastern Languages, Literature and Archaeology at Wilfrid Laurier University and was Dean of Graduate Studies and Research from 1974 to 1978. He founded the School of Religion and Culture, and the Wilfrid Laurier University Press. During his time at Wilfrid Laurier University he also served a term as the President of the Canadian Society of Biblical Studies. Wagner was President of the University of Calgary from 1978 to 1988.

Wagner served on the Board of Directors of Alberta Natural Gas Co. Ltd. from 1988 to 1995 and was chairman, president and chief executive officer from 1991 to 1994. He was on the board of the Organizing Committee for the 1988 Winter Olympics held in Calgary. He was chairman of the Terry Fox Humanitarian Award Program. He died of cancer in 2004.

== Honours ==
- Officer of the Order of Canada, 1988
- Honorary LL.D., Wilfrid Laurier University, 1984
- President Emeritus, The University of Calgary, 1990
- Honorary Patron, The Ecole Biblique et Archeologique Francaise Jerusalem - The Library Project.

== Personal life ==
Wagner was married to Cathy and had three children: Marj, Richard, and Jan.
