= Dalhousie Journal of Legal Studies =

- Discipline: Law
- Language: English

Publication details
- History: 1992-present
- Publisher: Schulich School of Law (Canada)
- Frequency: Annual

Standard abbreviations
- ISO 4: Dalhous. J. Leg. Stud.

Indexing
- ISSN: 1188-4258
- OCLC no.: 27725120

Links
- Journal homepage; Online table of contents

The Dalhousie Journal of Legal Studies is a non-profit, academic law journal that publishes work from current law students and recent alumni in Canada and throughout the world. It is produced by students from the Schulich School of Law (formerly Dalhousie Law School).

== History ==
Established in 1991, the Dalhousie Journal of Legal Studies is a forum that promotes reflection and debate about contemporary legal issues. As one of the only publications of its kind in Canada, the Journal serves as a unique vehicle for law students to publish their work.

The DJLS is published once per academic year and maintains a broad subscription base that includes law firms, law school libraries, corporations, government departments, alumni, and legal professionals from around the globe. The Journal is also indexed in the HeinOnline database.

An entirely student-run publication, the DJLS is managed by an editorial board, and over seventy volunteers comprising students from the Schulich School of Law at Dalhousie assist in production and publication.

It is distinct from the Dalhousie Law Journal which is a peer-reviewed journal produced by faculty, rather than students.
