= Ram Charan Mehrotra =

Indian analytical and organometallic chemist, academic and educationist

- Born: 16 February 1922; Kanpur, United Provinces, British India
- Died: 11 July 2004 (aged 82); Jaipur, Rajasthan, India
- Education: University of Allahabad; University of London
- Known for: Studies on chemical theory of indicators and organometallic derivatives
- Awards: 1949 Allahabad University E. G. Hill Memorial Prize; 1965 Shanti Swarup Bhatnagar Prize; 1975 FICCI Award; 1976 INSA Professor T. R. Seshadri Seventieth Birthday Commemoration Medal; 1977 ICS P. C. Ray Award; 1984 ISM Golden Jubilee Medal; 1986 ICS J. C. Ghosh Medal; 1987 Sōka University Academic Achievements Award; 1988 ISCA Platinum Jubilee Distinguished Service Award; 1990 Central Institute of Hindi Atma Ram Award; 1991 ISCA G. P. Chatterjee Award; 1992 ISCA Acharya Narendra Dev Award; 1993 ISCA Ashutosh Mukherjee Award; 1999 CRSI Lifetime Achievement Award; 2000 ICS Platinum Jubilee Award
- Scientific career
- Fields: Analytical chemistry; Organometallic chemistry
- Workplaces: Lucknow University; Birkbeck College; University of Gorakhpur; University of Rajasthan; University of Delhi; University of Allahabad

Ram Charan Mehrotra (16 February 1922 – 11 July 2004) was an Indian analytical and organometallic chemist, academic, educationist and the vice chancellor of the Universities of Delhi and Allahabad. He was known for his studies on the chemical theory of indicators, alkoxides and carboxylates of many elements. He was an elected fellow of the Indian National Science Academy, Indian Chemical Society, Chemical Society of London, Royal Institute of Chemistry, National Academy of Sciences, India and Indian Academy of Sciences. The Council of Scientific and Industrial Research, the apex agency of the Government of India for scientific research, awarded him the Shanti Swarup Bhatnagar Prize for Science and Technology, one of the highest Indian science awards, in 1965, for his contributions to chemical sciences.

== Biography ==
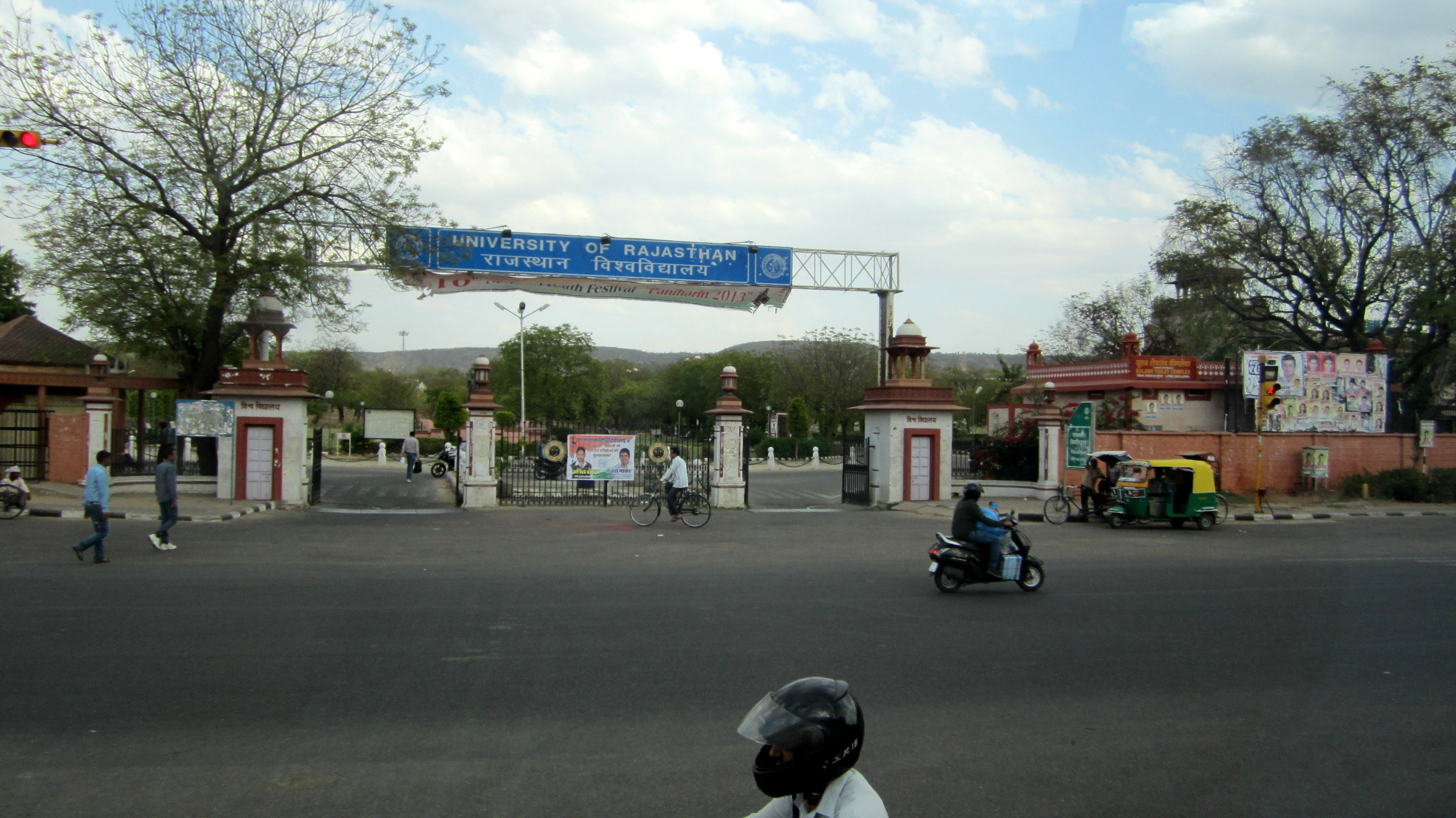
Rajasthan University

Ram Charan Mehrotra was born in a middle-class family on 16 February 1922 in Kanpur in the Indian state of Uttar Pradesh to Ram Bharose Mehrotra, a small-time cloth merchant and his homemaker wife, Chameli Devi. He lost both his parents before he turned 10 and had to continue his studies depending on merit scholarships and part-time jobs like private tuition. His primary schooling was at Municipal School, Kanpur and later he joined Christ Church School (present-day Christ Church College, Kanpur) from where he passed the intermediate course, standing first in the state. Joining the University of Allahabad in 1939 for his graduate studies, he completed the course on the strength of three scholarships (Note: Amarnath Jha, the then vice chancellor of the university, allotted two additional scholarships to Mehrotra) and passed BSc with Mathematics, Physics and Chemistry as optional subjects. He continued at the university for MSc in chemistry which he passed with first rank in 1943. During this period, he was also involved in student politics in connection with the Quit India Movement of 1942 and had to stay away from studies for four months.

Before starting his formal academic career by joining Allahabad University in 1944 as a member of faculty of inorganic chemistry, Mehrotra worked at Vigyan Kala Bhawan, Daurala, a local learning centre involved in teaching science to prospective young entrepreneurs, for ten months during 1943–44 and was also associated with Vigyan Pragati, a science magazine published by National Institute of Science Communication and Information Resources (NISCAIR) of the Council of Scientific and Industrial Research. He served the university till 1954; in between, he had a short stint of two years at Birkbeck College from 1950 to 1952 as a British Council Fellow and part-time faculty, working with Donald Charlton Bradley; he utilised this period to secure a PhD from the University of London in 1952. He returned to India the same year and resumed his service at Allahabad University when he was offered the position of a reader at Lucknow University in 1954. After serving four years there, he moved to Gorakhpur University in 1958 as a professor where, a year later, he was promoted as the dean of the faculty of science. It was during this time, he served as a member of the Review Committee in Chemistry of the University Grants Commission of India under the chairmanship of T. R. Seshadri, where his colleagues included Asima Chatterjee, a noted chemist.

In 1962, on invitation of Mohan Sinha Mehta, the then vice chancellor of the University of Rajasthan, he took up the post of a professor and head of the newly formed chemistry department and served the institution for two decades. In between, he had a five-year stint as the vice chancellor of Delhi University (from 1974 to 1979) and a short assignment as a UGC National Fellow in December 1979 but on completion of those assignments, he returned to Rajasthan University, where he stayed till 1982; on his move from the university, he was made an emeritus professor. That year, he became associated with the activities of the University Grants Commission, first as the chairman of the Commission on Revision of Pay Scales to Teachers which submitted its report to UGC in 1986. Simultaneously, when the National Commission on Teachers was constituted by the Government of India in 1983 under the chairmanship of D. P. Chattopadhyaya, he was appointed as a member of the Research Advisory Committee. After his assignment with the committee, he took up the chair of the Book Writing Project of the National Council of Educational Research and Training (NCERT) and in 1991, he was appointed as the vice chancellor of the University of Allahabad, a position he held in 1993.

Mehrotra was married to Suman, a Hindi scholar, whom he married in 1944 around the same time when he joined Allahabad University. The couple had two daughters, Rashmi and Shalini and one son, Piyush Mehrotra, in between. He died on 11 July 2004.

== Legacy ==
=== Researches ===
Mehrotra, during his early years in research, made notable contributions in analytical chemistry which included studies on tin, gold and hydrated copper oxide. Through his researches on the chemical theory of indicators, he elucidated the applicability of universal type of indicators, ceramic salts and of hypobromites and widened the understanding of alkoxides and carboxylates of many elements. His work covered the synthesis of several metallic compounds such as polymetaphosphates, alkoxides, beta-diketonates, carboxylates, thiolates and dialkyl 1 dithiophosphates.

=== Academics ===
While serving Rajasthan University as a professor, Mehrotra was known to have contributed in organizing a research school there and successfully tried to obtain Special Assistance Program as well as University Leadership Program from UGC. The research school has since published several original research papers in international journals. Similarly, he established research schools on inorganic and organometallic chemistry at the universities of Allahabad, Lucknow, and Delhi. During 1971–72, as a UGC National Professor, he delivered lectures at many Indian universities and he was a pioneer in popularizing science through Hindi medium for which he was awarded a cash prize by the Government of India in 1985. Besides over 800 articles published in peer-reviewed international journals, (Note: Please see Selected bibliography section) he authored five books viz. Metal alkoxides, Metal [beta] [beta]-diketonates and Allied Derivatives, Metal Carboxylates, Alkoxo and Aryloxo Derivatives of Metals and Organometallic Chemistry. He has also prepared texts for Indira Gandhi National Open University as a member of the Block Preparation Team.

=== Administration ===
Mehrotra was involved in policy-making bodies from early stages of his career when he sat in the Review Committee in Chemistry in 1960 and the committee made a number of recommendations on improvement of curriculum, research environment, and examination procedures of chemistry education in India. During 1963–67, he sat in the Chemical Advisory Committee of the Atomic Energy Commission of India. The Commission on Revision of Pay Scales to Teachers which he chaired in 1983 recommended that the procedure for selection of teachers should also include an assessment of the physical and mental abilities of the candidates. The commission also recommended for pay scale revision of the teaching staff ranging from over 200 to more than 300 per cent which was subsequently accepted by the Government of India and the revision was implemented in 1987 with retrospective effective from 1 January 1986.

Mehrotra served as the president of the chemistry section of the Indian Science Congress Association in 1967, he would also serve as its national president in 1979. Besides participating in the UGC ad-hoc commissions, he was also associated with the body as a convener of its chemistry panel and his association with the Council of Scientific and Industrial Research (CSIR) included the chair of the Chemical Research Committee (1975) and membership in CSIR Society and CSIR Governing Body (1963–66 and 1976–80). He served as the president of the Indian Chemical Society (1976–77) and Vigyan Parishad, Allahabad, as the vice president of the Indian National Science Academy - INSA (1977–78) and as a member of the International Union of Pure and Applied Chemistry (1977–81). He was also a member of the INSA council from 1979 to 1981.

== Awards and honors ==
During his early years at Allahabad University, Basu received the E. G. Hill Memorial Prize of the university in 1949 for the best research work by a member of the science faculty. The Indian National Science Academy elected Basu as a fellow in 1964 and the University of London honored him with the degree of Doctor of Science in 1965. The ensuing years would see him receive several honoris causa doctorates from Indian universities viz. Meerut University (1976), Kanpur University (1996), Jhansi University (2000) and Banares Hindu University (2000). The Council of Scientific and Industrial Research awarded him the Shanti Swarup Bhatnagar Prize, one of the highest Indian science awards, in 1965. The Federation of Indian Chambers of Commerce & Industry awarded him the FICCI Award for Science and Technology in 1975 and he received the Professor T. R. Seshadri Seventieth Birthday Commemoration Medal of the Indian National Science Academy in 1976 and the P. C. Ray Award of the Indian Chemical Society in 1977. He was awarded the National Fellowship by the University Grants Commission in 1980 and the Golden Jubilee Medal by the Institute of Science, Mumbai in 1984.

The J. C. Ghosh Medal of the Indian Chemical Society reached Mehrotra in 1986, followed by the Academic Achievements Award of the Sōka University in 1987. The Indian Science Congress Association honored him with four awards; starting with the Platinum Jubilee Distinguished Service Award in 1988; followed by G. P. Chatterjee Award in 1991, Acharya Narendra Dev Award in 1992 and Ashutosh Mukherjee Award in 1993. In between, he received the inaugural Atmaram Award of the Central Institute of Hindi. The Chemical Research Society of India awarded him Lifetime Achievement Award in 1999 and the Indian Chemical Society awarded him the Platinum Jubilee Award in 2000. He was an elected fellow of the Indian Academy of Sciences, Indian National Science Academy and National Academy of Sciences, India and a fellow of the Chemical Society of London, Royal Institute of Chemistry and the Indian Chemical Society. He also delivered several award orations and featured lectures; Special lecture at the XVII International Conference on Coordination Chemistry (1977), Plenary lecture at the XIX International Conference on Coordination Chemistry (1978), Plenary lecture at the IV International Conference on Solute-Solvent Interaction (1978), Clarence Karcher Memorial Lecture of University of Oklahoma (1982), the inaugural Foundation Lecture of the Federation of Asian Chemical Societies (1987) and N. R. Dhar Memorial Award Lecture of the National Academy of Science, India (1991) are some of the notable ones.

== Selected bibliography ==
=== Books ===
- D. C. Bradley; Ram Charan Mehrotra; D. P. Gaur (1978). Metal alkoxides. Academic Press.
- R. C. Mehrotra; R. Bohra; D. P. Gaur (1978). Metal [beta][beta]-diketonates and Allied Derivatives. Academic Press.
- Ram Charan Mehrotra; R. Bohra (January 1983). Metal Carboxylates. Academic Press. ISBN 978-0-12-488160-0.
- Don Bradley; R. C. Mehrotra; Ian Rothwell; A. Singh (22 February 2001). Alkoxo and Aryloxo Derivatives of Metals. Academic Press. ISBN 978-0-08-048832-5.
- R. C. Mehrotra (1 January 2007). Organometallic Chemistry. New Age International. ISBN 978-81-224-1258-1.

=== Articles ===
- Pathak, Madhvesh; Bohra, Rakesh; Mehrotra, Ram C.; Lorenz, Ingo-Peter; Piotrowski, Holger (2003). "Synthetic studies and structural aspects of novel metallacyclic compoundsof titanium(IV) incorporating nitrogen, oxygen and sulphur: 1. Reactions of cis-dialkoxy-bis(acetylacetonato)titanium(IV) with alkoxyalkanols and the crystal structure of a new modification: di-μ-oxo-bis[diacetylacetonatotitanium(IV)]". Transition Metal Chemistry. 28 (2): 187–192. doi:10.1023/A:1022901918955. S2CID 93728857.
- Mishra, Shashank; Tripathi, Upendra Mani; Singh, Anirudh; Mehrotra, Ram C. (2002). "Synthesis and characterisation of volatile, novel heterotrimetallic derivatives of lanthanides(III) containing nonaisopropoxodizirconate and tetraisopropoxoaluminate ligands". Synthesis and Reactivity in Inorganic and Metal-Organic Chemistry. 32 (4): 689–702. doi:10.1081/SIM-120004440. S2CID 97399275.
- Nag, Purnima; Bohra, Rakesh; Mehrotra, Ram C. (2002). "Dioxomolybdenum(vi) complexes as catalytic neutral esterification agents". Journal of Chemical Research. 2002 (2): 86–88. doi:10.3184/030823402103171249. S2CID 197322506.
- Nagar, Shweta; Bohra, R.; Mehrotra, R. C. (2002). "Synthesis and characterization of some unique heterocyclic derivatives containing aluminium(III) atoms in different co-ordination states. I. Reactions of bis(β-diketonato)-aluminium(III)-di-μ-isopropoxo-di-isopropoxoaluminium(III) with 2-pyridylmethanol". Synthesis and Reactivity in Inorganic and Metal-Organic Chemistry. 32 (10): 1825–1838. doi:10.1081/SIM-120016470. S2CID 97523846.
- Sharma, Maneesh K.; Singh, Anirudh; Mehrotra, Ram C. (2001). "Synthesis and characterization of heterobimetallic alkoxide triethanolaminate derivatives of zirconium". Synthesis and Reactivity in Inorganic and Metal-Organic Chemistry. 31 (3): 371–379. doi:10.1081/SIM-100002225. S2CID 97165383.
- Sharma, M.; Singh, A.; Mehrotra, R. C. (2000). "Synthesis and characterization of homo- and heterobimetallic diethanolaminates of alkaline earth metals". Polyhedron. 19 (1): 77–83. doi:10.1016/S0277-5387(99)00327-7.
- Dhammani, Anita; Bohra, Rakesh; Mehrotra, Ram C. (1998). "Synthesis and characterization of some unique heterocyclic derivatives containing aluminium(III) atoms in different coordination states--4. Reaction of bis (β- diketonato) aluminium(III)-di-μ-isopropoxo-di-isopropoxo aluminium(III) with 8-hydroxyquinoline". Polyhedron. 17 (1): 163–171. doi:10.1016/S0277-5387(97)00192-7.

== See also ==
- Amarnath Jha
- T. R. Seshadri
- Asima Chatterjee
- D. P. Chattopadhyaya
