= James McGregor Stewart =

Canadian lawyer (1889–1955)

James McGregor Stewart C.B.E., Q.C.

13th President of the Canadian Bar Association
- In office 1941–1942
- Preceded by: D'Alton Lally McCarthy
- Succeeded by: Gordon Harold Aikins, K.C.

Coal Controller, Wartime Prices and Trade Board
- Appointed by: C.D. Howe

Personal details
- Born: June 30, 1889 Pictou, Nova Scotia
- Died: February 11, 1955 (aged 65) Halifax, Nova Scotia
- Education: Dalhousie Law School
- Profession: Lawyer

James McGregor Stewart, CBE QC (June 30, 1889 – February 11, 1955) was a corporate lawyer in Halifax, Nova Scotia, Canada. Using crutches as a result of polio at age two, Stewart served as head of a Halifax law firm that became the largest law firm in Atlantic Canada and today bears his name, Stewart McKelvey. He also served as the President of the Canadian Bar Association in 1941–42. In 2000, Canadian Lawyer magazine named him one of Canada's ten greatest lawyers.

== Education ==
Stewart was a graduate of Pictou Academy in 1906 and a gold medalist at Dalhousie University in 1909. He graduated from Dalhousie Law School in 1914 at the top of his class where he was also President of the Students' Council. He was shortlisted for the Rhodes Scholarship but was not successful. The faculty senate at Dalhousie voted in 1910 not to appoint Stewart because he had had polio as a boy and walked with crutches. The motion proposed by Dean Richard Chapman Weldon read: "Serious physical defects should be considered as rendering a candidate ineligible for the Rhodes Scholarship."

== Early career ==
Stewart concluded his articles at a firm then known as Harris, Henry, Rogers & Harris and made partner within a year. He taught Real Property part-time at Dalhousie Law School and became head of his firm in 1927.

== Canadian Bar Association ==
He served as the first Nova Scotian to be President of the Canadian Bar Association (CBA), elected as its thirteenth president in 1941. Stewart cancelled the 1942 meeting of the CBA at the government's request to avoid interference with the movement of wartime troops and supplies. He was honoured posthumously at a 1955 meeting of the CBA in Ottawa, along with Sir Lyman Duff and others.

== Businessman and corporate director ==
He was a businessman, serving as a director of the board of many firms including Royal Bank of Canada, Sun Life, and Montreal Trust. He was also a President of Acadia Sugar Refining for many years and served as a lawyer to financier, Izaak Walton Killam and the Royal Securities Corporation where he played a role in the consolidation of the Nova Scotia fishing industry Stewart also played a role in the deal that established the seventeen million dollar Mersey paper mill. He also acted as a mentor to Frank Manning Covert who became a lawyer in his own right.

== Legal career ==
He appeared several times before the Supreme Court of Canada and Judicial Committee of the Privy Council (JCPC). In 1939, he participated in a radio debate on the CBC with Dean Frederick Cronkite of the University of Saskatchewan College of Law on the merits of appeals to the JCPC. Stewart argued in favour of continuing such appeals, praising the quality of the lords of appeal in ordinary who sat on the JCPC.

== Coal Controller ==
He served as Coal Controller during World War II for the Wartime Prices and Trade Board (WPTB) as a dollar-a-year man but was eventually asked to resign by C.D. Howe. In 1944, he was awarded the Commander of the Order of the British Empire, Civil Division for his distinguished wartime service.

== Dalhousie University ==
He also was extremely active in the governance of Dalhousie University. He joined the Board of Governors in 1929 and was elected as chair of its Board of Governors in 1937. He actively sought the removal of its president, Carleton Stanley in the 1940s.

== Kipling hobby ==
Stewart was also a collector of writings by Rudyard Kipling and met Kipling at his home in Sussex in 1932. A 673-page catalogue of Kipling's writings authored by Stewart was published posthumously in 1959 by Dalhousie University Press. Stewart donated the published portion of his Kipling Collection to Dalhousie University in 1954. He was profiled in a monograph about Atlantic Canada book collectors, published in 1996.

== James McGregor Stewart Society ==
A disability rights organization is named after Stewart, the James McGregor Stewart Society, and is active in the Halifax, Nova Scotia area.
