= Terry White (academic) =

Canadian academic (born 1943)

President of the University of Calgary
- In office 1988–1997
- Preceded by: Murray Fraser
- Succeeded by: Harvey Weingarten

Personal details
- Born: March 31, 1943 (age 83) Ottawa, Ontario, Canada
- Education: University of Wisconsin–Oshkosh; Michigan State University; University of Toronto
- Occupation: academic

Terrence Harold White (born March 31, 1943) is a Canadian academic. He served as president of the University of Calgary from 1996 to 2001. From 1988 to 1996, he was president and vice-chancellor of Brock University, and prior to that the Dean of the Faculty of Arts at the University of Alberta. He is an alumnus of the University of Wisconsin–Oshkosh, Michigan State University, and University of Toronto.
