= Murray Fraser =

Canadian academic (1937–1997)

7th Dean of Dalhousie Law School (acting)
- In office 1971–1972
- Preceded by: William Andrew MacKay
- Succeeded by: Ronald St. John Macdonald

President of the University of Calgary
- In office 1988–1997
- Preceded by: Norm Wagner
- Succeeded by: Terry White

Personal details
- Born: April 18, 1937 Liverpool, England
- Died: March 12, 1997 (aged 59) Calgary, Alberta, Canada
- Occupation: academic administrator

F. Murray Fraser, QC (April 18, 1937 – March 12, 1997) was a Canadian academic and University president.

== Early life and education ==
Born in Liverpool, England, Fraser was raised in Nova Scotia. He received undergraduate degrees in Arts (1957) and Law (1960) from Dalhousie University and a Master's in Law (1962) from the University of London in the United Kingdom.

== Career ==
He was made a Queen's Counsel in Nova Scotia in 1979. He taught law at Queen's University, Dalhousie University, University of Victoria and University of Calgary. He was the founding dean of the University of Victoria Faculty of Law. He was later appointed vice-president, academic of the University of Victoria. From 1988 to 1996, he was the president and vice-chancellor of the University of Calgary.

He received honorary degrees from Dalhousie, the University of Victoria and the Memorial University of Newfoundland.

== Death ==
He died in 1997, of heart failure, at the age of 59.
