= Common But Differentiated Responsibilities =

United Nations principle on climate change

Common But Differentiated Responsibilities (CBDR) is a principle that was formalized in the United Nations Framework Convention on Climate Change (UNFCCC) of Earth Summit in Rio de Janeiro, 1992. The CBDR principle is mentioned in UNFCCC article 3 paragraph 1.., and article 4 paragraph 1. It was the first international legal instrument to address climate change and the most comprehensive international attempt to address negative impacts to global environment. The CBDR principle acknowledges that all states have shared obligation to address environmental destruction but denies equal responsibility of all states with regard to environmental protection.

In the Earth Summit, states acknowledged disparity of economic development between developed and developing countries. Industrialization proceeded in developed countries much earlier than it did in developing countries. CBDR is based on the relationship between industrialization and climate change. The more industrialized a country is, the more likely that it has contributed to climate change. States came to an agreement that developed countries contributed more to environmental degradation and should have greater responsibility for climate change mitigation than developing countries should. The CBDR principle could therefore be said to be based on the polluter-pays principle where historical contribution to climate change and respective ability to combat climate change become measures of responsibility for environmental protection.

The concept of CBDR evolved from the notion of "common concern" in Convention for the Establishment of an Inter-American Tropical Tuna Commission of 1949 and "common heritage of mankind" in United Nations Convention on the Law of the Sea, 1982.

== Objectives ==
In general, there are three objectives of contracting differential treatment; to bring substantive equality in a framework for justice, to foster cooperation among states, and to provide incentives for states to implement their obligations.

In the Earth Summit, the CBDR principle was established to apprise the world that pollution transcends political boundaries and that environmental protection should be achieved through means of cooperation. UNFCCC 1992, Article 3 paragraph 1, "The Parties should protect the climate system for the benefit of present and future generations of humankind, on the basis of equity and in accordance with their common but differentiated responsibilities and respective capabilities. Accordingly, the developed country Parties should take the lead in combating climate change and the adverse effects thereof."

== Background: Differential Treatments ==
CBDR was not the first differential treatment of countries in international agreements. There were other protocols and agreements that employed a principle of differential treatment:

- Kyoto Protocol
- Paris Agreement
- Montreal Protocol on Substances that Deplete the Ozone layer (Montreal Protocol)
- Washington Naval Treaty
- Part IV of General Agreement on Tariffs and Trade (GATT) 1979
- principle 23 of Declaration of the United Nations Conference on the Human Environment 1972

== Criticism ==
In 2002, Lavanya Rajamani argued that developing countries would have an unfair economic advantage because they would not face the same restrictions as developed counties would. A climate change treaty would be ineffective without the participation of developing countries. The US has suggested that developing countries are not doing enough to satisfy their share of 'common responsibility for the problem' of climate change. Developing countries, however, argued that their carbon emissions are essential to their survival, while those of the developed countries are 'luxury emissions.'

Christopher D. Stone argued that the meaning of the word 'differentiated' could be problematic as every agreement differentiates. He also says CBDR is "neither universal nor self-evident." Philippe Cullet points out that with CBDR, it may be difficult to determine the existence of specific customary norms. He suggests that CBDR, because it requires that actions be taken on the basis of capabilities and contributions made by countries to major global challenges such as climate change, it may make it difficult to determine specific customs. This is because CBDR demands that there be flexibility in application, thereby making it difficult for universally agreed-upon legal principles to be determined.

Todd Stern, then U.S. Special Envoy on Climate Change, said in his commencement speech at Dartmouth's 2012 graduation ceremony that the world can no longer have two distinct categories of countries having different responsibility for climate change mitigation. Countries should instead follow differentiation of a continuum, where states are required to act vigorously according to their own circumstances, abilities and responsibilities. He emphasized sharing the responsibility to reduce carbon emissions between all countries instead of having a group of countries take the bulk of the responsibility for mitigation.

== CBDR: Kyoto vs Paris ==
The Paris Agreement departed from the prior paradigm of rigid categorization between industrialized and developing countries. Under prior agreements, such as the Kyoto Protocol, there was a rigid distinction between Annex 1 and Annex 2 countries among the parties to the Kyoto Protocol, which determined the countries' responsibilities. Industrialized (Annex 1) countries had to observe strict limits on emissions, while other countries did not. Under the Paris Agreement, each country makes its own nationally determined contribution based on its own national circumstances, and as circumstances change, so do the responsibilities.
