= Harvey Weingarten =

President of the University of Calgary
- In office 2001–2009
- Preceded by: Terry White
- Succeeded by: M. Elizabeth Cannon

Personal details
- Born: June 24, 1952 (age 74) Montreal, Quebec, Canada
- Education: McGill University; Yale University
- Occupation: psychologist

Harvey Weingarten (born June 24, 1952) is a Canadian academic. He served as president of the University of Calgary from 2001 to 2009. He was previously the provost and Vice-president Academic of McMaster University. He is a psychology and medical researcher, and alumnus of McGill University and Yale University. He was also a professor the McMaster's department of psychology and dean of the university's faculty of science. He was the first Jew to serve as President of the University of Calgary.
