= Malcolm H. Chisholm =

Chemist and academic

Malcolm H. Chisholm FRS FRSE
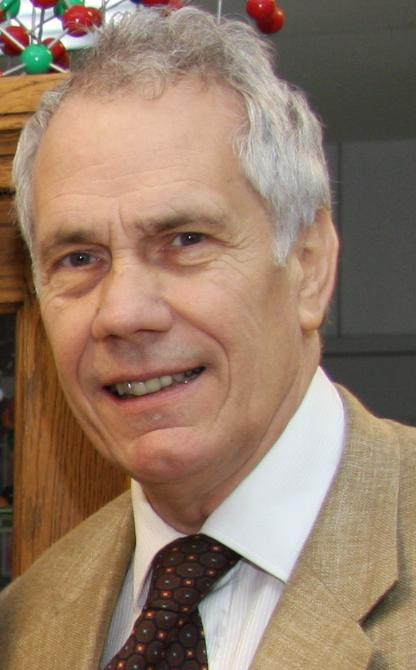
- Chisholm in October 2009
- Born: Malcolm Harold Chisholm; 15 October 1945; Bombay, Bombay Presidency, British India
- Died: 20 November 2015 (aged 70); Worthington, Ohio, US
- Citizenship: British
- Education: Queen Mary College
- Known for: Organometallic complexes with metal-metal bonds
- Scientific career
- Fields: Inorganic Chemistry
- Institutions: Princeton University; Indiana University; Ohio State University
- Thesis: Ligand field aspects of transition metal dialkylamides and related compounds (1969)
- Doctoral advisor: Donald Charlton Bradley
- Other academic advisors: Howard Charles Clark

Malcolm Harold Chisholm (15 October 1945 – 20 November 2015) was a British inorganic chemist who worked mainly in North America, a Professor of Chemistry and Biochemistry, and Distinguished University Professor of Mathematical and Physical Sciences at Ohio State University who contributed to the synthesis and structural chemistry of transition metal complexes.

== Early life and education ==
Malcolm Harold Chisholm was born on 15 October 1945 in Bombay, British India, where his parents were based. Six months after his birth, Chisholm's family moved back to the United Kingdom to the family's home in Inverness. At the age of 3, his family then moved to southern England where he obtained his early education. He later went to Queen Mary College and received a BSc in 1966 and a PhD in Inorganic Chemistry in 1969 whilst working under the direction of Donald C. Bradley. As an undergraduate, Chisholm perform research on Fe_{2}(CO)_{9} under the direction of Alan G. Massey.

== Career ==
W_{2}(O-t-Bu)_{6}was first prepared by Chisholm and Extine.

After receiving his PhD, Chisholm went to the University of Western Ontario to work as a postdoctoral fellow in the laboratory of Howard Charles Clark from 1969 to 1972.

He held faculty positions at Princeton University, Indiana University, and Ohio State University. He achieved recognition for developing the chemistry of alkoxy- and amido-supported complexes of dimolybdenum and ditungsten, illustrated by Mo_{2}(NMe_{2})_{6}.

== Recognition ==
Chisholm received several awards and honors, among them:

- American Chemical Society Award in Inorganic Chemistry (1989)
- Centenary Prize from the Royal Society of Chemistry (1994)
- Davy Medal of the Royal Society (1999)
- American Chemical Society Award for Distinguished Service in the Advancement of Inorganic Chemistry (1999)
- Ludwig Mond Award of the Royal Society of Chemistry (2001)
- Fred Basolo Medal from Northwestern University (2004)
- Nyholm Prize for Inorganic Chemistry from the Royal Society of Chemistry (2010)
- Edward W. Morley Medal from the ACS Cleveland Section (2012)

He was elected as a fellow of the Royal Society in 1990, a fellow of the Royal Society of Edinburgh in 2005, a member of the U.S. National Academy of Sciences in 2005 and a member of the Leopoldina in 2004.
