= William Arthur Cochrane =

Canadian pediatrician, academic and medical executive

President of the University of Calgary
- In office 1974–1978
- Preceded by: Alfred Carrothers
- Succeeded by: Norm Wagner

Personal details
- Born: March 18, 1926 Toronto, Ontario, Canada
- Died: 6 October 2017 (aged 91) Calgary, Alberta, Canada
- Education: University of Toronto
- Occupation: academic administrator, physician
- Awards: Order of Canada; Alberta Order of Excellence

William Arthur Cochrane, OC AOE (March 18, 1926 – October 6, 2017) was a Canadian physician, pediatrician, academic, and medical executive.

Born in Toronto, Ontario, he received his Doctor of Medicine from the University of Toronto in 1949. Cochrane did his postgraduate training in Pediatric Research at the Hospital for Sick Children, the Cincinnati Children's Research Foundation and Great Ormond Street Hospital. From 1958 to 1967, he was a Professor of Pediatrics at Dalhousie University. From 1967 to 1973, he was the dean of the Faculty of Medicine of the University of Calgary. From 1973 to 1974, he was the Alberta Deputy Minister of Health. From 1974 to 1978, he was the president of the University of Calgary. From 1978 to 1989, he was the chairman, president and chief executive officer of Connaught Laboratories Limited.

In 1989, he was made an Officer of the Order of Canada. In 1977, he was awarded the Queen Elizabeth II Silver Jubilee Medal and in 1992, he was awarded the 125th Anniversary of the Confederation of Canada Medal. In 2006, he was made a member of the Alberta Order of Excellence. In 2009, he was inducted into the Canadian Medical Hall of Fame.
