= Donald Charlton Bradley =

British chemist

Donald Charlton Bradley CBE FRS
- Born: 7 November 1924; London, United Kingdom
- Died: 20 December 2014 (aged 90)
- Education: Birkbeck, University of London
- Spouses: Joy Hazeldean (1948–1985 [her death]); Ann Levy (1990–2014 [his death])
- Children: 1 son (with Joy Hazeldean); 1 stepdaughter (from Ann Levy)
- Awards: Royal Medal
- Scientific career
- Fields: Inorganic chemistry
- Workplaces: Queen Mary, University of London; Imperial College
- Doctoral advisor: William Wardlaw
- Doctoral students: Malcolm H. Chisholm

Donald Charlton Bradley CBE FRS, (7 November 1924 – 20 December 2014) was a British chemist who was recognized for his work on the chemistry of metal-alkoxides and metal-amides, their synthesis, structure and bonding, and for his studies of their conversions to metal-oxides and metal-nitrides.

== Biography ==
Donald Charlton Bradley was born in London on 7 November 1924 at the Paddington Green Children's Hospital, the son of Gladys Winifred Bradley, a milliner, from Leamington Spa. Gladys's older sister Doris Marian and her husband John brought up Donald, mostly in Hove. There he attended Hove County Grammar School for Boys.

After gaining his Higher School Certificate in sciences and maths, Bradley was directed to work at the British Electrical and Allied Industries Research Association (ERA) in northwest London, as part of the war effort. He investigated the effects of mustard gas on electrical components, and how to extend the lifetime of capacitors. During this apprenticeship he enrolled for a part-time degree at Birkbeck College in London, and gained a first-class BSc in 1946. He went on to do research for a PhD, under Professor William Wardlaw. during which he studied zirconium alkoxide compounds [Zr(OR)_{4}]_{n}. He was awarded his PhD in 1950.

Bradley continued at Birkbeck, working with Ram Charan Mehrotra, who was visiting for two years from India, and Marc Faktor, among others.

On 21 August 1959, Bradley, his wife and son sailed on the SS Maasdam from Southampton to Canada, en route to London, Ontario, where Donald was to take up a professorial job at the University of Western Ontario (UWO), working with Fred Pattison and Paul de Mayo.

After six years in Canada, Bradley was offered the chair in inorganic chemistry at Queen Mary College in London (QM), starting in 1965. Amongst other achievements he hired crystallographer Michael Hursthouse and so started a thriving X-ray crystallography group at QM.

Don formally retired in 1987, remaining very active in research as emeritus professor of inorganic chemistry.

=== Family ===
While at the ERA Bradley met Constance Joy Hazeldean (Joy), the librarian there. They married in 1948 and had one child, David, on 18 May 1951. Joy died on 9 March 1985.

In January 1988 he met Ann Levy (née MacDonald). They married at St Olav's church in the City of London on 10 June 1990.

Donald Charlton Bradley died on 20 December 2014.
