= Richard Devlin (legal scholar) =

Canadian law professor

Richard Devlin FRSC
- Born: Richard Francis Devlin; November 25, 1960 (age 65); Belfast, Northern Ireland

Academic background
- Education: Queen's University Belfast; Queen's University
- Thesis: Law, State and Violence: Preliminary Inquiries (1984)

Academic work
- Discipline: Law
- Sub-discipline: Legal ethics, contract law, critical legal studies
- Institutions: Dalhousie University

Richard Francis Devlin FRSC (born November 25, 1960) is a Canadian law professor at Dalhousie University. In the late 1990s Devlin, alongside fellow professor Wayne MacKay, was accused by fellow Professor Carol Aylward of being one of the parties that denied her a tenured appointment out of his racial prejudice. Aylward sued both of the professors, as well as others, for denying her the appointment on racial grounds. He was thus named in the lawsuit Cowan et al. v. Aylward et al as a party to oppressing Aylward's academic trajectory, which reached the Nova Scotia Supreme Court. Devlin and Carol Aylward, the woman who accused him of racist treatment, were former coauthors on academic publications.

In 2020, Devlin was appointed the Acting Dean of the Schulich School of Law to replace Camille Cameron while she was on medical leave for a year. Prior to this, Devlin was elected as a Fellow of the Royal Society of Canada in 2015.
