= Regional Assessment Appeal Court =

The Regional Assessment Appeal Court (RAAC) is administered by the Province of Nova Scotia.
