= Maureen Batt =

Canadian opera singer

- Born: October 6, 1981 (age 45)
- Origin: Halifax, Nova Scotia, Canada
- Genres: Opera, classical, electronic
- Occupation: singer
- Instrument: Voice (soprano)
- Website: https://maureenbatt.com

Maureen Batt is a Canadian soprano concert and opera artist. She also holds a position on the board of directors for the Canadian Music Centre.

== Education ==
Maureen Frances Batt was raised in Fredericton, New Brunswick, Canada. As a child, she was educated at Saint Dunstan's School and George St. Junior High (later named George Street Middle School). She studied in her school's French-language immersion program, and won first place in the French public speaking competition held by the Canadian Parents for French organization when she was in the ninth grade. She began taking private voice lessons around this same time, but had previously spent years studying piano and violin. She studied voice with Maureen Steeves in Fredericton and David Mitchell in Saint John.

While a student at Fredericton High School (FHS) Batt performed in school productions of Rodgers and Hammerstein's Carousel (1997, as Nettie), Grease (1998, as Patty), and New Canadian Kid (1999, as Mog). She also sang in the girl's chorus at FHS. She graduated from FHS in 1999. She earned a Bachelor of Arts from St. Thomas University followed by a Bachelor of Music from Dalhousie University. She holds a Master of Music from the University of Toronto. She is also an alumna of the St. Andrews Opera by the Sea workshop, the Halifax Summer Opera Workshop, the Casalmaggiore International Music Festival, the Daniel Ferro Vocal Program in Italy, and the Centre for Opera Studies in Italy.

== Career ==
In 2010 Batt founded the opera company Essential Opera in Toronto with fellow soprano Erin Bardua. The company's mission includes presenting works both old and new, focusing on core values of equity, diversity, and inclusion. The organization presented concert versions of operas in Toronto until moving to New Hamburg, Ontario in 2014. Operas which Batt and Bardua oversaw as co-artistic directors included Wolfgang Amadeus Mozart's The Marriage of Figaro (2010), Jules Massenet's Chérubin (2011), George Frideric Handel's Alcina (2012, with Batt as Alcina) and Christoph Willibald Gluck's Paride ed Elena (2014, with Batt as Elena).

In 2012 Batt was the soprano soloist in Handel's Messiah with the Windsor Symphony Orchestra. In 2014 she starred as Belinda in Dido and Aeneas with Island View Opera. In 2015 she founded a contemporary Western art music recital series Crossing Borders which has toured through the United States, Canada, and Colombia.

In 2016 Batt recorded Schubert's 1826 song cycle Sieben Gesänge aus Walter Scotts die Fräulein vom See, Op. 52 (Seven Songs from Walter Scott's The Lady of the Lake) which includes Schubert's "Ave Maria". Titled Lady of the Lake, it was released by the Leaf Music record label in 2017. With the artist Grej (Gregory Harrison) she made the album Lighthouse which won the 2022 Classical Album of the Year prize at the East Coast Music Awards.

== Discography ==
- Lady of the Lake (2017)
- Lighthouse (2021)
- Aunt Helen (2021)
- Mirror, Mirror (2021)
- Durme, Durme: Four Ladino Folk Songs (2023)

== Awards and nominations ==
Year	Organization	Work	Award	Result	Ref.
2018	East Coast Music Awards	Lady of the Lake	Classical Recording of the Year	Nominated	
2021	Music Nova Scotia Awards	Aunt Helen	Classical Recording of the Year	Nominated	
2022	Juno Awards	Saman Shahi, Breathing in the Shadows (ft. Maureen Batt)	Classical Composition of the Year	Won	
2022	East Coast Music Awards	Maureen Batt & Grej, Lighthouse	Classical Recording of the Year	Nominated	
2022	Music Nova Scotia Awards	Maureen Batt & Grej, Lighthouse	Classical Recording of the Year	Nominated	
2023	Music Nova Scotia Music & Industry Awards	Maureen Batt & Tara Scott, Durme, Durme: Four Ladino Folk Songs	Classical Recording of the Year	Nominated	
