= John F. Marra =

American marine biologist

- Occupations: Biological oceanographer, academic and author

Academic background
- Education: BS in Zoology; PhD in Biological Oceanography
- Alma mater: Oregon State University; Dalhousie University

Academic work
- Institutions: CUNY Graduate Center

John F. Marra is a biological oceanographer, academic, and author. He has been a member of the CUNY Doctoral Faculty in Earth and Environmental Sciences as well as the Doctoral Faculty in Biology since 2007.

Marra's research encompasses oceanography, phytoplankton, ocean optics, and photosynthesis. He participated in 28 oceanographic cruises, serving as Chief Scientist in 11 of them. He has received honors from NASA, including the Earth Science Enterprise Terra Award, Exceptional Achievement Medal, and Office of Earth Science Award. Additionally, he served as the Section Editor of Elsevier's Encyclopedia of Ocean Sciences. He is the author of Hot Carbon: Carbon-14 and a Revolution in Science, published by Columbia University Press.

Marra is a Sustaining Fellow of the American Society of Limnology and Oceanography.

== Education and early career ==
Marra completed his Bachelor of Science in Zoology from Oregon State University in 1968, followed by a PhD in Biological Oceanography from Dalhousie University in 1977. He began his early career serving as a Commissioned Officer in the US Navy, from 1968 to 1972, with an Honorable Discharge. During his graduate studies, he had roles as a Graduate Research Assistant and Teaching Assistant at Dalhousie University from 1972 to 1977.

== Career ==
After completing his PhD, Marra served as a Post-Doctoral Fellow and research associate at Columbia University's Lamont-Doherty Earth Observatory and then was appointed as research associate in 1977. In 1983, he was elected to the Observatory's Senior Staff, and appointed Research Scientist. He became a Senior Research Scientist in 1987, and eventually Doherty Senior Research Scientist until 1999, after which he was appointed Doherty Senior Scholar. During this time, he served as the associate director for the Division of Oceans and Climates at Lamont-Doherty from 1991 to 1992 and later as the associate director for the Division of Biology and Paleo Environments from 2001 to 2007. In 1999, he assumed the role of Program Scientist at NASA Headquarters and held the position until 2001. In 2007, he was appointed Professor of Earth and Environmental Sciences at Brooklyn College of the City University of New York, and served as the Director of the Aquatic Research and Environmental Assessment Center until his retirement in 2023, when he became professor emeritus. His research interests during those years pivoted towards Brooklyn's waterways, particularly Jamaica Bay and Prospect Park Lake. Since 2007, he has been a member of the CUNY Doctoral Faculty in Earth and Environmental Sciences as well as Doctoral Faculty in Biology.

== Research ==
Marra has been engaged in oceanographic programs over the years, focusing on the interaction of physical oceanographic processes with phytoplankton, the influence of ocean optical properties on biology (and vice versa), and understanding global ocean primary productivity both in situ and from space-borne sensors.

=== Biological oceanography ===
Early in his career, Marra investigated phytoplankton photosynthesis in experimental bottles, simulating Langmuir circulations, and which yielded estimates of photosynthesis 19-87% higher than control samples. Later, analyzing seasonal patterns of phytoplankton biomass and productivity in the southern Ross Sea, he observed rapid spring biomass increase, summer peak chlorophyll levels, and an early peak in carbon assimilation. His research also compared satellite algorithms for daily production accuracy, finding the best ones within a factor of two of 14C-derived estimates, with no correlation observed between complexity and performance.

Marra's research has spanned monsoon effects in the Arabian Sea and Indonesia, frontal systems' impacts on phytoplankton ecology, and springtime re-stratification in the North Atlantic. With a focus on ocean color, sea surface temperature, and wind data in the Indonesian Seas, he identified seasonal productivity patterns influenced by monsoonal winds, with notable anomalies during the 1997–1998 El Niño/La Niña, and Indian Ocean Dipole periods. His highly cited work on ocean productivity involved evaluating primary production models based on ocean color and circulation models, highlighting challenges in extreme environmental conditions and advocating for improved photosynthesis parameterization for accurate modeling. In addition, he explored phytoplankton bloom dynamics in the North Atlantic Ocean and Arabian Sea, using data from three mooring experiments to reveal the critical role of stratification changes in the Iceland Basin, and highlighting their importance for blooms in all experiments.

Marra authored the book Hot Carbon, aimed at nonscientific audiences. Published in 2019, this book explored the influence of carbon-14, a radioactive isotope, across various scientific disciplines, from archaeology to climatology, highlighting its role in dating artifacts and understanding the mysteries of human civilization and geological time. Chris Turney's review of the book in Nature stated, "Hot Carbon offers a timely perspective on how mind-bogglingly connected our planet is — and how 14C will continue to be important in helping us to understand what lies ahead."

== Awards and honors ==
- 2000 – Earth Science Enterprise Terra Award, NASA
- 2001 – NASA Exceptional Achievement Medal, NASA
- 2001 – Office of Earth Science Award, NASA
- 2001 – Group Achievement Award, NASA

== Bibliography ==
=== Books ===
- Hot Carbon: Carbon-14 and a Revolution in Science (2019) ISBN 978-0231186704

=== Selected articles ===
- Marra, J. (1978). Phytoplankton photosynthetic response to vertical movement in a mixed layer. Marine biology, 46, 203–208
- Marra, J., Bidigare, R. R., & Dickey, T. D. (1990). Nutrients and mixing, chlorophyll and phytoplankton growth. Deep Sea Research Part A. Oceanographic Research Papers, 37(1), 127–143.
- Marra, J., Houghton, R. W., & Garside, C. (1990). Phytoplankton growth at the shelf-break front in the Middle Atlantic Bight.
- Marra, J. (1995). Primary production in the North Atlantic: measurements, scaling, and optical determinants. Philosophical Transactions of the Royal Society of London. Series B: Biological Sciences, 348(1324), 153–160.
- Campbell, J., Antoine, D., Armstrong, R., Arrigo, K., Balch, W., Barber, R., ... & Yoder, J. (2002). Comparison of algorithms for estimating ocean primary production from surface chlorophyll, temperature, and irradiance. Global biogeochemical cycles, 16(3), 9–1.
- Carr, M. E., Friedrichs, M. A., Schmeltz, M., Aita, M. N., Antoine, D., Arrigo, K. R., ... & Yamanaka, Y. (2006). A comparison of global estimates of marine primary production from ocean color. Deep Sea Research Part II: Topical Studies in Oceanography, 53(5–7), 741–770.
- Marra, J. (2009). Net and gross productivity: weighing in with 14C. Aquatic Microbial Ecology, 56(2–3), 123–131.
