= Simon Farine =

Canadian basketball player

No. 4 – Ironi Kiryat Ata B.C.
- Position: Guard
- League: Israeli Super League

Personal information
- Born: March 21, 1987 (age 39) Toronto, Ontario, Canada
- Listed height: 6 ft 2 in (1.88 m)
- Listed weight: 200 lb (91 kg)

Career information
- High school: Northern Secondary School (Toronto, Ontario)
- College: Green Bay (2005–2006); Dalhousie (2007–2011)
- NBA draft: 2011: undrafted
- Playing career: 2011–present

Career history
- 2011–2012: Maccabi Haifa
- 2012–2013: Hapoel Tivon Megiddo
- 2013–2014: Ironi Kiryat Ata
- 2014–2015: Ironi Nahariya
- 2015–present: Ironi Kiryat Ata

Simon Farine (born March 21, 1987) is a Canadian basketball player who currently plays for Ironi Kiryat Ata of the Israeli Super League.

== Early life and high school career ==
Farine was born in Toronto, Ontario. Playing for the powerhouse Northern Secondary School Red Knights, Farine was a three-sport star (basketball, football, and baseball). On the court, he excelled and was named the MVP of the Nike All Canada Basketball Camp in 2004, and in 2005 was named Northern Secondary School Athlete of the Year and a Toronto Star Basketball All Star.

== College career ==
=== NCAA ===
After mulling offers from Division I schools such as Davidson, Boston University, and Colgate, Farine committed to the Wisconsin-Green Bay Phoenix to start his college career. Appearing in 27 games he averaged 1.4 ppg in limited action.

=== CIS ===
==== 2007–08 season ====
After one year at Wisconsin-Green Bay, Farine decided to transfer to the Dalhousie Tigers of the CIS where he felt he would be able to develop more with increased playing time. After redshirting the 06–07 season, Farine averaged 15.9 ppg, 5.0 ast, 5.8 reb, but was not satisfied by his team's overall performance.

==== 2008–09 season ====
He followed the 07–08 season with the best season yet in 08-09, averaging 19.1 ppg, 4.5 ast, and 5.3 reb, while shooting 43.6% from the field and 38.5% from three-point range. Averaging 29.7 pts, 7.7 rebs, and 6.0 ast a game in the playoffs, Farine led his Dalhousie Tiger's to the school's first AUS Championship in 13 years, scoring 45 pts in the championship game, setting an AUS playoff scoring record, and taking home the tournament's Most Valuable Player Award.

==== 2009–10 season ====
Farine put together another big year in the 09–10 season, leading the Dalhousie Tigers by averaging 21.9 pts, 6.5 reb, and 5.5 ast. Simon had an impressive assist to turnover ratio of 3.09, and was 3rd in steals with over 2 a game. The Tigers could not repeat as AUS champions as they lost to Cape Breton in the semi-finals.

==== 2010–11 season ====
Going into his last season with the Tigers, Farine appeared in all 20 games and averaged 36 minutes a game. With season averages of 19.1 ppg, 6.4 reb, and 4.5 ast, he led the Dalhousie Tigers to their second AUS Championship in the last 3 years. He was named Tournament MVP, as well as the Player of the Game in the Championship game, where he scored 24 points. Farine was named a CIS All-Canadian, and First Team AUS All Star. Simon scored 1,452 regular season points over his career at Dalhousie, making him the second leading scorer in Tiger's history.

== Professional career ==
=== Maccabi Haifa ===
Farine decided to play professionally for the 2011–12 season. Following a June tryout in South Florida, Simon signed a two-year deal with Maccabi Haifa of the Israeli Super League. Head coach Mickey Gorka said: “We were very impressed with Simon Farine in the U.S. tryouts, Simon shined amongst excellent competition at the U.S. tryouts. He’s a physical guard, strong rebounder, with a nice touch from mid-range and will add depth to our roster this season."

Farine struggled to get consistent playing time in his first professional season, as Haifa had numerous veteran guards ahead of him. Appearing in 16 games, he averaged 11 minutes a game, scoring 2.3 ppg.

=== Hapoel Tivon Megiddo ===
Farine headed back to Israel for the 2012–2013 season. Shortly after signing with Hapoel Tivon Megiddo, Farine said “Last season I gained invaluable experience practicing and playing with some elite players in Haifa, I am excited to be going back to Israel and I am ready to make an immediate impact with Tivon Megiddo this season.”

Farine went on to start all 31 games and rank 3rd in the league in minutes per game at 35.9. While the team finished the season with a record of 8–18, Farine went on to average 15.5 pts, 4.6 reb, 3.8 ast, and 1.4 stls. Farine led Tivon-Megiddo to four wins in their final six regular season games, averaging 17.3 pts over that span.

=== Ironi Kiryat Ata ===
Farine decided to continue his professional career in Israel by signing a one-year contract with Ironi Kiryat Ata of the Israeli National League. Joining a team that was aggressively chasing a promotion to Israel's first division was very attractive to Farine. After two seasons playing in Israel, Farine had his sights set on winning a league championship. Once his signing was made official he spoke about his new team saying “I am thrilled to be joining Ironi Kiryat Ata this fall, it is a great organization from top to bottom and I think we have a real shot to win it all.”

=== Professional career statistics ===
Season	Team	G	PTS	REB	AST	STL	BLK	FG%	3P%	FT%	MIN	TO
2011–12	Maccabi Haifa	16	2.3	0.8	0.4	0.5	0.5	.250	.364	.667	11.1	0.3
2012–13	Hapoel Tivon Megiddo	31	15.5	4.6	3.8	1.4	0.2	.463	.344	.731	35.9	2.7
2013–14	Ironi Kiryat Ata	30	16.5	4.4	4.1	1.4	0.2	.481	.340	.783	34.4	2.0
Career:		77	11.4	3.3	2.8	1.1	0.3	.398	.349	.727	27.1	1.7

†	Denotes season where Farine was named an Israeli National League First Team All Star

== 2009 Macabbi Games ==
Simon traveled with the Macabbi Team Canada basketball team to the 2009 Maccabiah Games (the "Jewish Olympics"), held in Israel in July 2009. Captaining a relatively inexperienced team, Farine took charge by leading the tournament in scoring. Facing the U.S. team in the semifinals, Farine and his teammates went up against a team full of professional and Division I players. Coached by former Tennessee Head Coach Bruce Pearl, the U.S. team allowed Farine to score 31 points. The U.S. team went on to defeat Canada in the semi-finals. Losing only to Israel and the United States, Canada came away with a very respectable 3rd-place finish. Canada's Head coach John Dore spoke to the media about Farine's role to the team saying; "Simon was our best player and his game is off the charts right now. He was unbelievable against the Americans."
