= Tom Traves =

Canadian academic

Thomas Donald Traves (born 1948) is a Canadian academic professor and administrator. He was the 10th President of Dalhousie University, serving from 1995 to 2013. He was appointed for a one year term as Interim President of Brock University on October 1, 2016.

== Biography ==
Born in Winnipeg, Manitoba, Traves received a Bachelor of Arts degree in 1970 from the University of Manitoba. He also received a Master of Arts degree in 1971 and a PhD in 1976 from York University. In 1974, he started teaching at York University as a lecturer. He became an assistant professor in 1976 and was an associate professor from 1976 to 1991. From 1981 to 1983, he was Chairman in the division of social science. From 1983 to 1991, he was Dean of the Faculty of Arts. From 1991 to 1995, he was Vice President (Academic) and a professor of history at the University of New Brunswick. In 1995, he was appointed to a six-year term as President and Vice-Chancellor of Dalhousie University. He was appointed to a second six-year term in 2000 and was appointed for a three-year term starting in 2007. Since becoming president, enrollments at Dalhousie have grown by over 40 per cent and external research grant and contract income has increased by 300 per cent.

He also has an honorary doctorate from Umeå University in Sweden.

He is the author of The State and Enterprise: Canadian Manufacturers and the Federal Government, 1917-1931 and editor of Essays in Canadian Business History.

== See also ==
- List of Canadian university leaders

Academic offices
Preceded by Howard Charles Clark	10th President of Dalhousie University; 1995 – 2013	Succeeded by Richard Florizone
