= Meinhard Doelle =

Canadian lawyer and professor (1964–2022)

- Born: May 25, 1964; Dortmund, North Rhine-Westphalia, West Germany
- Died: September 17, 2022 (aged 58); Pembroke, Nova Scotia
- Education: BSc (Dalhousie); JD (Dalhousie); LLM (Osgoode Hall); JSD (Dalhousie)
- Occupations: Lawyer, professor
- Employer(s): Schulich School of Law, Dalhousie University
- Known for: Drafter of the Environment Act (Nova Scotia); Climate change policy research
- Notable work: Research Handbook on Climate Change Law and Loss & Damage

Meinhard Doelle (May 25, 1964 – September 17, 2022) was a German-born Canadian lawyer and university professor at the Schulich School of Law at Dalhousie University. He was the founder and executive director of several environmental law organizations, as well as the drafter of the Environment Act of Nova Scotia.

== Education ==
Meinhard Doelle was born on May 25, 1964, in Dortmund, Germany. Doelle graduated from his bachelor's of science in 1986 with a major in chemistry from Dalhousie University. He then earned his LLB from the university's faculty of law in 1989. He was called to the Nova Scotia bar in 1990, and earned his LLM from Osgoode Hall Law School in 1991. He later received his JSD from Dalhousie University with a dissertation entitled From Hot Air to Action? Climate Change, Compliance, and the Future of International Environmental Law.

== Academic career ==
Meinhard Doelle served as a professor of law at Dalhousie University, as well as their associate dean of research. He also previously served as the chair in Marine Environmental Protection at the World Maritime University in Malmö, Sweden. Among his book publications, he was the co-author of the Carswell textbook Environmental Law: Cases and Materials. He is known for his research on energy law and environmental law, including the impact of policy on climate change. He also previously served as the Chair of the Marine & Environmental Law Institute at Dalhousie.

== Career as a lawyer ==
Doelle was previously the executive director of the Clean Nova Scotia Foundation. He is perhaps best known for his role as the drafter of the Environment Act, legislation for the Government of Nova Scotia in 1995. He was also an advisor on the 1992 federal legislation Canadian Environmental Assessment Act, and a non-governmental member of the Canadian delegation to the United Nations climate change negotiations from 2000 to 2006. In 2013 he was appointed to a panel to overhaul the Province of Nova Scotia's policies on aquaculture.

== Personal life and death ==
Doelle died on September 17, 2022 near his cottage in Pembroke, Nova Scotia, at the age of 58 after his bicycle was struck by a motorvehicle.
