= William Andrew MacKay =

Canadian judge

William Andrew MacKay QC

8th President of Dalhousie University
- In office 1980–1986
- Chancellor: Marcia Anastasia Christoforides
- Preceded by: Henry Hicks
- Succeeded by: Howard Charles Clark

6th Dean of Dalhousie Law School
- In office 1964–1969
- Preceded by: Vincent C. MacDonald
- Succeeded by: Murray Fraser

Personal details
- Born: March 20, 1929 Halifax, Nova Scotia, Canada
- Died: January 12, 2013 (aged 83) Halifax, Nova Scotia, Canada
- Education: Dalhousie University
- Occupation: academic, diplomat, civil servant, lawyer

William Andrew MacKay QC (March 20, 1929 – January 12, 2013) was a Canadian lawyer and former judge, civil servant, legal academic, and university president.

== Education and early career ==
Born in Halifax, Nova Scotia, the son of Robert Alexander MacKay and Mary Kathleen Junkin, MacKay received a Bachelor of Arts degree in 1950, a Bachelor of Law degree in 1953, and a Master of Law degree in 1954 from Dalhousie University. He was called to the Nova Scotia Bar in 1954 and was created a Queen's Counsel in 1973.

He joined the Department of External Affairs in 1954 where he worked as a Foreign Services Officer. From 1955 to 1957, he was an Assistant Secretary of the Royal Commission on Canada's Economic Prospects.

== Academic career ==
In 1957, he became an assistant professor at Dalhousie University. He was an associate professor from 1959 to 1961 and was made a professor in 1961. From 1960 to 1961, he received a Ford Foundation Fellowship to study at Harvard University. In 1963, he became the George Munro Professor of Law. From 1964 to 1969, he was the dean of the Faculty of Law and the Weldon Professor of Law. From 1969 to 1988, he was professor. From 1969 to 1980, he was a vice-president at Dalhousie University. From 1980 to 1986, he was the eighth president and vice-chancellor.

== Judicial career ==
From 1967 to 1986, he chaired the Nova Scotia Human Rights Commission. In 1988, he was appointed Justice of the Federal Court of Canada (Trial Division). He retired in 2004. From 2004 to 2007, he was as a Deputy Judge of the Federal Court. In 2008, he was appointed an ad hoc Information Commissioner.

== Death ==
Local newspapers reported that Dr. Mackay died suddenly on January 12, 2013.

Academic offices
Preceded by Henry Hicks	8th President of Dalhousie University; 1980–1986	Succeeded by Howard Charles Clark
