= Fred Fountain =

Canadian lawyer and businessman

Fred S. Fountain
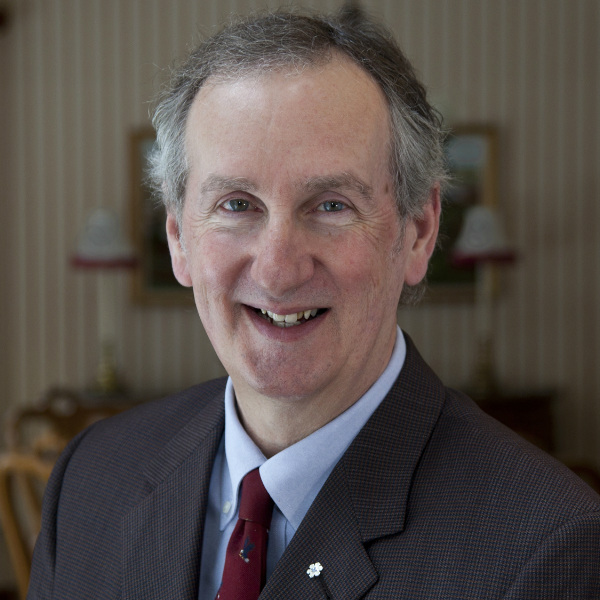
- Born: Frederick Sheldon Fountain; July 29, 1948 (age 77); Truro, Nova Scotia
- Occupations: Lawyer, businessman
- Known for: philanthropy

Frederick Sheldon Fountain CM (born July 29, 1948) is a Canadian lawyer, businessman and philanthropist. He was the chancellor of Dalhousie University from 2008 to 2015.

== Early life and education ==
Born in Truro, Nova Scotia, son of Sheldon Leroy and Marjorie (Manning) Fountain, he graduated from King's-Edgehill School and then went on to Dartmouth College where he graduated with a Bachelor of Arts in French, and then graduated from Dalhousie University in 1974 with a Bachelor of Laws degree.

== Career ==
He was a founding partner of a Halifax law firm, Franklin Fountain Mitton and Thompson (later Burke Thompson) and a judge of the Regional Assessment Appeal Court from 1980 to 1989. He has been the chief executive officer of "Great Eastern Corporation Ltd" since 1985. The company is an asset management firm that was founded in 1941 by his grandfather Fred Manning. By 2009, after a brief period during which he took the company public, it had estimated assets of $102 million. As of 2014, its annual report showed profits of $17.7 million on total assets of $582 million.

== Philanthropy ==
For his philanthropy, especially in the field of the arts, Fountain was invested with the award of Member of the Order of Canada by then Governor General of Canada Michaëlle Jean on June 18, 2010. In May 2013, he donated $10 million to Dalhousie University's to establish a performing arts school.

His term as Chancellor was extended from June 2014 to March 31, 2015 and his successor was Anne McLellan (May 25, 2015).

Academic offices
Preceded by Richard Goldbloom	Chancellor of Dalhousie University; 2008–2015	Succeeded by Anne McLellan
