= Roy Leitch =

Canadian activist and Spanish Civil War veteran (1882–1957)

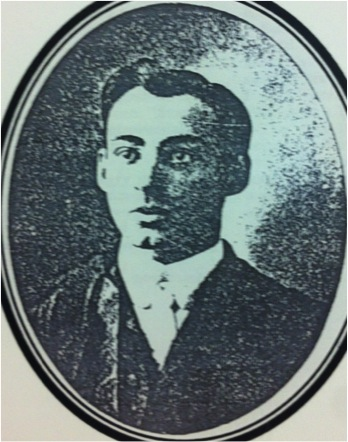
- Roy Leitch, c. 1914
- Born: 1882; Prince Edward Island, Canada
- Died: 1957 (aged 74–75)
- Education: Dalhousie University
- Occupations: Activist; military volunteer
- Military Service
- Allegiance: Spanish Republic
- Branch: Spanish Republican Army
- Units: 35th Division; XV International Brigade; Mackenzie–Papineau Battalion
- Conflicts: Spanish Civil War; First World War; Serbian Campaign

Roy Leitch (1882–1957) was a Canadian Rhodes scholar, professor, activist and soldier of the Serbian Campaign (World War I). He later fought in the Spanish Civil War, serving in the Mackenzie–Papineau Battalion. He self-published the newspaper Storm (1939–1957). He used his newspaper to expose corruption by lawyers, clergy and all forms of government.

== Biography ==
Leitch was born in Prince Edward Island. He attended Dalhousie University, and while there he was named a Rhodes Scholar (1911), and later a professor of English Composition (1929–1931).

As an activist he formed his own political party, the Christian Socialists, which failed to garner a membership. He started the Catamaran Club for boys, also known as the Unholy Angels Club, and provided a place for homeless youth to stay.

In 1935 the Royal Canadian Mounted Police had Leitch under surveillance as a communist. On 16 January 1935, he was a guest speaker at the Unemployed and Tax Payers Association of Halifax, Nova Scotia. By this time, he had launched a small newspaper called Dawn. He was promptly sued for defamation, went to trial in March 1935, was convicted, and spent a week in jail.

At age 49, Leitch became a soldier and fought fascism in the Spanish Civil War (1937). The Communist Party of Canada (which included Dr. Norman Bethune) had a significant recruitment effort in Nova Scotia for the Mackenzie-Papineau Battalion to fight against fascism in the Spanish Civil War, even though at that time, joining the Battalion was illegal in Canada. There were 31 volunteers from the Maritimes, 19 from Nova Scotia. (1500 volunteers were recruited across the country and half of them were killed in the defeat.) From 3–18 February 1939, 421 returning soldiers of the Battalion disembarked at Halifax. The last Nova Scotian veteran of the "Mac-Paps" died in the 1980s. The Canadian Government has always denied official recognition of these veterans. On 20 October 2001, Governor General of Canada Michaëlle Jean commemorated a monument to the Mackenzie-Papineau Battalion in Ottawa.

Leitch built a cabin in the woods on Colpitt Lake in Spryfield, Nova Scotia during the 1930s. From his cabin he self-published the newspaper Storm (1939–1957). He used his newspaper to expose corruption by lawyers, clergy and all forms of government.

== See also ==
- Military history of Nova Scotia
