= Said Awad =

Canadian urologist

Said A. Awad, (Arabic: سعيد عبد الكريم عوض) is a Canadian urologist who is professor emeritus of Urology at Dalhousie University Medical School, in the City of Halifax, Nova Scotia.

Born in Cairo, Egypt and obtained his MD from Cairo University in 1959.

Awad joined the department of Urology at Queen's University at Kingston, Ontario in 1971 and developed neuro-urology at the university and established the first urodynamics laboratory in the region. He later joined Dalhousie University in 1980 to act as the head of Urology Department there until 1997, when he was succeeded by Dr. Richard Norman.

He has publications on urinary incontinence and neuro-urology, a field which he largely influenced. He is also a member of the International Contienance Society for medical professionals, concerned with furthering education, scientific research, clinical practice and removing the stigma of incontinence.

Awad retired on July 31, 2003, and continues to live in Halifax with his wife Sharon.

== Publications ==
- "Urge incontinence in the elderly - supraspinal reflex incontinence" World Journal of Urology, Volume 16, Number 7 / August, 1998.
- "Neurogenic bladder in lower motor neuron lesion: Long-term assessment" Neurourology and Urodynamics, Volume 11, Issue 5, 1992, Pages: 509–517. (Authored with: J.B. Gajewski, L.P.H. Heffernan, T.J. Benstead, J.W. Downie).
- "A comparison of the cough and standing urethral pressure profile in the diagnosis of stress incontinence" Neurourology and Urodynamics, Volume 7, Issue 4, 1988, Pages: 327–341. (Authored with: Mark Cadogan, Christopher Field, Kelly Acker, Susan Middleton).
- "The influence of filling rates and sympathectomy on bladder compliance in the chloralose-anaesthetised cat" Neurourology and Urodynamics, Volume 7, Issue 4, 1988, Pages: 377–384. (Authored with: Hugh D. Flood, John W. Downie).
- "Selective sacral cryoneurolysis in the treatment of patients with detrusor instability/hyperreflexia and hypersensitive bladder" Neurourology and Urodynamics, Volume 6, Issue 4, 1987 Pages: 307-315 (Authored with: Hugh D. Flood, Kelly L. Acker, A. John Clark).
- "The effectiveness of bethanechol chloride in lower motor neuron lesions: The importance of mode of administration" Neurourology and Urodynamics, Volume 3, Issue 3, 1984, Pages: 173–178. (Authored with: Rosemary H. McGinnis, John W. Downie)
- "The dependence of sustained bladder contractions provoked by filling or by subcutaneous bethanechol upon sacral afferent pathways" Neurourology and Urodynamics Volume 3, Issue 1, 1984, Pages: 35–41. (Authored with S. El-Salmy, J. W. Downie).
- "Urodynamic procedures: Recommendations of the Urodynamic Society. I. Procedures that should be available for routine urologic practice" Neurourology and Urodynamics Volume 1, Issue 1, 1982, Pages: 51–55. (Authored with: J. G. Blaivas, N. Bissada, O. P. Khanna, R. J. Krane, A. J. Wein, S. Yalla).
