= Sara Seck =

Canadian legal scholar

Sara Seck is a professor at the Schulich School of Law of Dalhousie University. In 2021 she was appointed the Yogis and Keddy Chair in Human Rights Law. Prior to her appointment she served as associate dean (research) of the law school. In 2023 she was appointed the director of the Marine & Environmental Law Institute. Her research focuses on environmental law, which she began her career teaching and researching at the University of Western Ontario.
