= Frank Manning Covert =

Canadian lawyer (1908–1987)

- Born: January 13, 1908; Canning, Nova Scotia
- Died: November 1, 1987 (aged 79)

Frank Manning Covert, OC OBE DFC QC (January 13, 1908 – November 1, 1987) was a Canadian lawyer.

Born in Canning, Kings County, Nova Scotia, the son of Dr. A.M. Covert and Minnie A. (Clarke) Covert, he graduated from Dalhousie University in 1929 at the top of his class. He joined the law firm of Stewart McKeen in 1930 where he mentored under James McGregor Stewart and became a partner in 1936. It later became Stewart McKelvey, the largest law firm in Atlantic Canada.

From 1940 to 1942, he served with the Department of Munitions and Supply and was a protégé of the C.D. Howe. He enlisted in the RCAF in September 1942. On May 10, 1945, he was awarded the Distinguished Flying Cross.

A well known corporate director, he served on more than 50 corporate boards, including the Royal Bank of Canada.

In 1982, he was made an Officer of the Order of Canada in recognition of having "shown outstanding ability in the field of industrial relations" and "given generously of his counsel and leadership to universities, hospitals and charitable organizations."

In 2004 the book, Frank Manning Covert: Fifty Years in the Practice of Law, based on his diaries and edited by Barry Cahill was published by McGill-Queen's University Press.

In 1934, he married Mary L. Covert, the daughter of his uncle Walter Harold Covert, the Lieutenant Governor of Nova Scotia (1931–1937). They had four children: Michael, Peter, Susan and Sally.
