= Graham Day =

Canadian business executive (1933–2025)

Sir Graham Day OC ONS CD KC
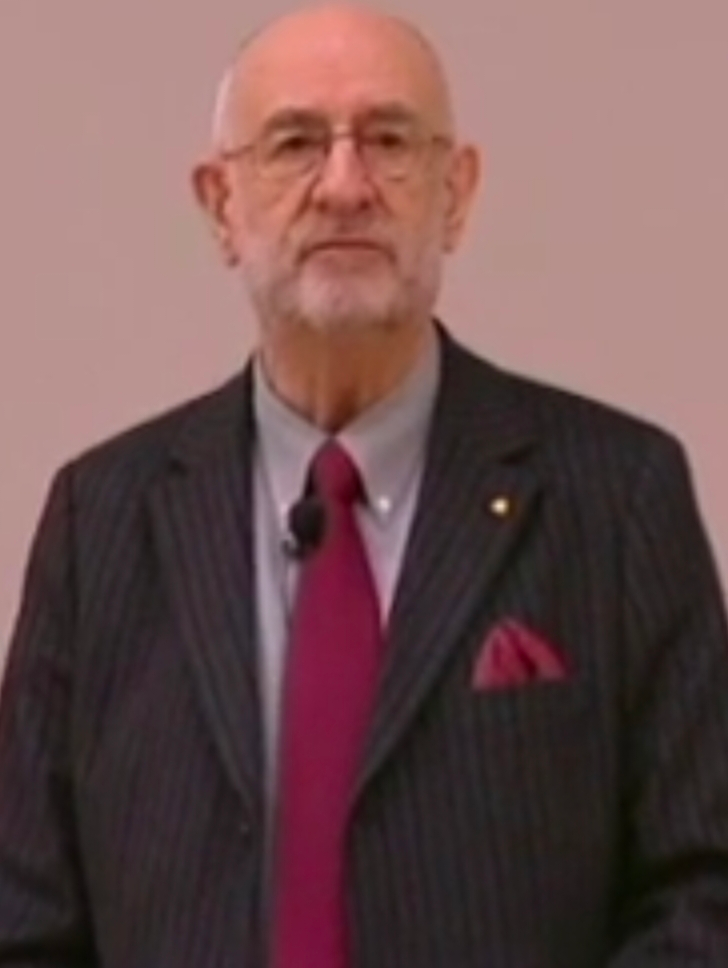
- Day in 2011
- Born: Judson Graham Day; 3 May 1933; Halifax, Nova Scotia, Canada
- Died: 31 July 2025 (aged 92); Windsor, Nova Scotia, Canada
- Education: Dalhousie Law School (LL.B.)
- Occupations: Lawyer; counsel; business executive

Chancellor of Dalhousie University
- In office 1994–2001
- Preceded by: H. Reuben Cohen
- Succeeded by: Richard Goldbloom

Chairman of Cadbury
- In office 1989–1993
- Preceded by: Adrian Cadbury
- Succeeded by: Dominic Cadbury

Sir Judson Graham Day OC ONS CD KC (3 May 1933 – 31 July 2025) was a Canadian business executive, lawyer and corporate director.

== Early life and education ==
Born in Halifax, Nova Scotia on 3 May 1933, Day graduated from Dalhousie Law School with an LL.B. in 1956 and briefly appeared on Singalong Jubilee.

== Career ==
Day began his career working at the Simpsons Department Store in Halifax selling Hartt brand shoes while attending university. Day was chairman and CEO of British Shipbuilders from 1983 to 1986, and chairman and CEO of the Austin Rover Group from 1986 until 1991. From 1989 to 1993 he was chairman of Cadbury Schweppes, between its last two family chairmen, Sir Adrian Cadbury and Sir Dominic Cadbury. He was chancellor of Dalhousie University from 1994 to 2001. He was chairman of Hydro One, but left following controversy over levels of executive and board compensation. He was later counsel at Stewart McKelvey, an Atlantic Canadian law firm.

== Death ==
Day died at a hospital in Windsor, Nova Scotia on 31 July 2025, at the age of 92.

== Honours ==
Day received a number of honours. He was knighted in 1989 by Queen Elizabeth II and was inducted into the Canadian Business Hall of Fame in 2006. Day was appointed a member of the Order of Nova Scotia by Lieutenant Governor of Nova Scotia Mayann Francis in 2011 and an Officer of the Order of Canada by Governor General of Canada David Johnston in 2014. He received honorary degrees from Dalhousie University and several universities in the United Kingdom.

Academic offices
Preceded by H. Reuben Cohen	Chancellor of Dalhousie University; 1994–2001	Succeeded by Richard Goldbloom
