= Reuben Cohen =

Canadian lawyer, businessman and academic (1921– 2014)

H. Reuben Cohen CC ONB QC

3rd Chancellor of Dalhousie University
- In office 1990–1994
- Preceded by: The Lady Beaverbrook
- Succeeded by: Sir Graham Day

Personal details
- Born: July 11, 1921 Moncton, New Brunswick
- Died: October 24, 2014 (aged 93) Moncton, New Brunswick, Canada
- Spouse(s): Louise Cohen (born Glustein)(1951-1988, her death); Astrid Cohen (née Lundrigan) (2012-2014, his death)
- Children: 2
- Education: Dalhousie University
- Occupation: Businessman, lawyer

H. Reuben Cohen, CC ONB QC (July 11, 1921 – October 24, 2014) was a Canadian businessman, lawyer, and the third Chancellor of Dalhousie University.

Born in Moncton, New Brunswick, he received a Bachelor of Arts degree from Dalhousie University in 1942 and a Bachelor of Law degree from the Dalhousie Law School in 1944. He started a law practice in Moncton in 1945 and was created a Queen's Counsel in 1968.

From 1990 to 1994, he was the third Chancellor of Dalhousie University.

He is the founder of the Canadian trust company, Central Guaranty Trust Corporation. He published his autobiography, A time to tell: The public life of a private man (Key Porter Books, ISBN 1-55013-957-6), in 1998.

Reuben Cohen died on October 24, 2014, at the age of 93.

== Honours ==
In 1979, he was made a Member of the Order of Canada in recognition for "more than thirty years to community endeavours, particularly as president of fund-raising campaigns for the new hospital and its modern neuro-surgical equipment". He was promoted to Officer in 1990 in recognition for having "continued to contribute to the Canadian economy and to devote time and energy to charitable endeavours in his community". In 2001, he was promoted to the highest level of the Order, Companion, for continuing "to work tirelessly to improve the quality of life of all citizens".

He has received honorary degrees from Université de Moncton (1973), Acadia University (1983), St. Thomas University (1985), University of New Brunswick (1988) and Dalhousie University (1988). The Université de Moncton art gallery is named the Galerie d'art Louise-et-Reuben-Cohen, in honour of Reuben Cohen and his wife Louise who were major donors.

In 2004, he was inducted into the New Brunswick Business Hall of Fame.

In 2010, he was made a member of the Order of New Brunswick "for his contributions to the advancement of academic excellence in Atlantic Canada and the success of social endeavors in his home community of Moncton".

Academic offices
Preceded by Marcia Anastasia Christoforides	Chancellor of Dalhousie University; 1990 – 1994	Succeeded by Graham Day
