= Leslie M. Little =

Tax Court of Canada
- Incumbent
- Assumed office January 28, 2002

Personal details
- Education: Mount Allison University, Dalhousie University

Leslie M. Little is a judge who served on the Tax Court of Canada.
