= Arlene Duncan =

Canadian actress

- Born: Oakville, Ontario, Canada
- Other name: Kairene
- Education: Sheridan College
- Occupations: Actress, singer
- Years active: 1978–present

Arlene Duncan is a Canadian actress and singer. Her father is African Canadian, with ancestors from Nova Scotia. Duncan has appeared in more than 80 film and television roles, in addition to many theatrical productions. She is best known for her television role as Fatima, a diner owner in the CBC situation comedy Little Mosque on the Prairie.

== Early life and education ==
Duncan was born in Oakville, Ontario, to Alvin Aberdeen Duncan, a Royal Canadian Air Force veteran of World War II, and a Jamaican mother, Icilda. Her father's side of the family has been living in Canada for five generations. She is the great-granddaughter of Benedict Duncan, a slave who fled Maryland through the Underground Railroad and became a sexton in Oakville. Her great-great-grandfather, Samuel Adams, moved to Canada in 1855. Duncan's family has been heavily involved in Oakville's Black community, her great-grandfather Jeremiah Adams was the groundkeeper of Turner Chapel (Oakville) and her father worked as Oakville's resident Black historian until his death in 2009. Additionally, Duncan's mother founded the Canadian Caribbean Association of Halton. Canadian Olympic sprinter Donovan Bailey is Duncan's half-brother.

Duncan attended T. A. Blakelock High School in Oakville. During her time there, she was active in drama and student band. She graduated from Sheridan College's musical theatre program. Duncan was a winner of the Du Maurier's Search for Stars contest and represented Canada at the Pacific Song Contest in 1979.

== Career ==
In 1982, Duncan released her debut single "I Wanna Grove", which won her the Female Vocalist of the Year Award at the 1983 Canadian Black Music Awards in 1983. Duncan also has performed under the name Kairene, releasing the single "I Need a Man" under Radikal Records in 1993. She has additionally sung jingles for McDonald's, Pepsi and Toyota. In 1994, the Black Label Artists Coalition awarded Duncan for Outstanding Achievement in Dance/House Music.

Duncan has been active in musical and dramatic theatre. She has been involved in theatrical productions of Sophisticated Ladies, Jacob Two-Two Meets the Hooded Fang, Once on This Island, The Mother Club, A Raisin in the Sun, Ain't Misbehavin', The Nutmeg Press, Recurring John and The Who's Tommy. Duncan won a Dora Mavor Moore Award in 2012 for Outstanding Performance by a Female (Musical) for her performance in Caroline, or Change. Duncan's performance as Caroline in Caroline, or Change earned her a Dora Mavor Moore Award in 2012 for Outstanding Performance by a Female (Musical) and a Toronto Theatre Critics Award for Best Actress in a Musical.

Duncan has appeared in many movies and television shows, most notably portraying café owner Fatima Dinssa on the CBC Television series Little Mosque on the Prairie. Duncan played Harriet Tubman in the CBC Television Special All for One, for which she received an ACTRA Award. Duncan later reprised the role of Harriet Tubman in 1995 in CBS's Gemini Awards-nominated "Sing Out, Freedom Train". In recent years, she has also appeared in minor roles on Degrassi: The Next Generation, Suits, and A Dog's Journey. Duncan's most notable recent role has been as Velma Diggs in the ongoing CBC Television series Diggstown.

Duncan has cited Diana Ross, Salome Bey, and Melba Moore as influences.

== Work ==
=== Film ===
Year	Film	Role
1979	An American Christmas Carol	Jennie Reeves
1987	The Liberators	Amanada
1988	All for One	Harriet Tubman
1995	Sing Out Freedom Train	Harriet Tubman
1996	Extreme Measures	E.R. Nurse
2000	Enslavement: The True Story of Fanny Kemble	Harriet
2001	Drop the Beat	Mrs. Brown
2001	Don't Say a Word	Aide
2002	The Scream Team	Sherriff
2003	Eloise at Christmastime	Lily
2005	Get Rich or Die Tryin'	Judge
2009	Chloe	Party Guest
2012	Silent Hill: Revelation	Teacher
2014	A Fighting Man	Mary
2017	Flint	Claire McClinton
2019	Easy Land	Mrs. Fraser
2019	A Dog's Journey	Hilda

=== Television ===
Year	Series	Role	Notes
1997–2004	Franklin	Officer Rabbit	
2005–2008	Degrassi: The Next Generation	Mrs. Van Zandt	4 Episodes
2007–2012	Little Mosque on the Prairie	Fatima Dinssa	91 Episodes
2013	Covert Affairs	Patricia	
2013–2017	But I'm Chris Jericho!	Ms. Lawrence	12 Episodes
2014–2017	Teenagers	Sandra	7 Episodes
2015	Suits	Emma Powell	2 Episodes
2018	The Rick Mercer Report	Announcer	
2019–2020	Diggstown	Velma Diggs	6 Episodes
2024	The Spiderwick Chronicles	Melvina	1 Episode

=== Theatre ===
Year(s)	Production	Role	Notes
1987	Sophisticated Ladies	N/A	
1997	Ain't Misbehavin'	N/A	Played the role introduced by Armelia McQueen
1999	The Nutmeg Princess	Nutmeg Princess	Based on the book of same name
2011–2012	Caroline, or Change	Caroline	Won Dora Mavor Moore Award for Performance
2014	Recurring John	The Park Dweller	
2014	The Mother Club	Marge	
2014	Once on This Island	Mama Euralie	
2024	Mistletoe Murders	Vera Van Dorne	
