= Alvin Duncan =

Canadian historian (1913–2009)

Alvin B. Aberdeen Duncan (27 February 1913 – 29 January 2009) was an African Canadian historian and a Royal Canadian Air Force veteran of World War II.

Duncan's family is the only family known in Oakville, Ontario who were directly involved in the Underground Railroad. Duncan was a descendant of black farmer and conductor James Wesley Hill, known as Canada Jim, who brought over 700 slaves to Oakville Harbour in Ontario's Underground Railway.

Duncan was the sole Black historian in Oakville, whose research in Black history in Canada resulted in permanent heritage exhibits in Oakville Museum.

He received several awards for his military service, as well for his research and work on Black history.

== Early life ==
Duncan was born 27 February 1913 in Oakville, Ontario. He was the third of six children to parents Alexander and Isabella Duncan. His father's primary occupation was a painter and decoration, and he served as the church's organist and choirmaster at the Turner Chapel. Duncan's sister Grace died in 1924 to influenza, while his brother Urban died in 1996.

Duncan went to Oakville Trafalgar High School, before attending Ryerson for radio courses.

When Duncan was 17, he witnessed 75 members of the Ku Klux Klan from Hamilton raid Oakville in protest of the interracial relationship between Ira Johnson and Isabella Jones. He described the incident with the white supremacist group as unforgettable while he watched a cross burning on the lawn of Johnson's house.

== African Canadian heritage ==
Duncan's family had direct involvement in the Canadian abolitionist movement through the Underground Railroad in southern Ontario. Duncan is descended from James Wesley Hill, who crossed the Canadian border through Oakville Harbour within a packing box in 1840 before establishing a farm near Oakville. Hill had made trips, as an Underground railroad conductor, to Maryland to bring approximately 700 African Americans to Oakville along the Underground Railroad, acts that branded him a criminal in the United States. Hill's strawberry farm made Oakville the strawberry capital of Canada, and was where he hired former slaves brought to Canada from the United States.

Duncan's paternal grandfather, Benedict, was brought by Quaker abolitionist supporters from Maryland to Oakville, becoming the sexton of St. John's United Church.

Duncan's maternal great-grandfather, Samuel Adams, was a free man from Baltimore who came to Oakville in 1855, opening up a blacksmith practice in Bronte, creating inventions such as a stonehooker for house construction. He also built the Turner Chapel, the town's sole African Methodist Episcopalian Church, running it with his son, Jeremiah.

== Career ==
Alvin, who was a member of the Lorne Scot Army Rifle Regiment in Oakville, had set out to join the Royal Canadian Air Force during World War II, which he had to repeat the entrance exam for acceptance. Medical officers after his acceptance had informed Duncan could not serve due to health conditions of his heart "on the wrong side." This was eventually disputed by Duncan with support from his commanding officer, and was accepted into the air force as a radar mechanic. During his time on a secret mission to Northern Ireland, Duncan was one of two black Canadian soldiers, on loan by the British Royal Air Force, that were radar operators.

After the end of World War II, Duncan returned to Canada to find work, and was employed by Avro Canada, a factory that produced CF-100 fighter jets during the Cold War, until its closure in 1959. Duncan then started an electronics business in Oakville named Al Duncan Television.

Duncan was an active member of the several historical societies, including the Oakville Historical Society, the Oakville Black History Society, and the Ontario Black History Society. He was Oakville's sole Black historian, supporting the creation of permanent African American heritage exhibits at Oakville Museum. He was also a consultant for author Lawrence Hill's books Any Known Blood, where the character Aberdeen is loosely based on him, and Black Berry, Sweet Juice.

Duncan spoke at schools on local Black history until his health declined, suffering from Alzheimer's disease.

== Personal life ==
Duncan married Jamaican Canadian Icilda Francis, who founded the Canadian Caribbean Association of Halton, before separating in the 80's. They had a daughter, actress Arlene Duncan, who is the mother of his two grandchildren, Matthew and Yuri Koller.

Duncan died of a stroke at the Post Inn Village Nursing home in Oakville on 29 January 2009.

== Awards ==
Duncan received several awards for his service in the military, which include a Defence Medal, a Victory Medal, a Volunteer Medal, a Captain of the Royal Canadian Legion Medal for members of the Air Force Telecommunications Association.

In 1946, Britain gave Alvin and other Canadian operators special commendation from the government for their contribution in secret missions in Europe following Churchill's call to Canada in support the war effort. The 1946 commendations were destroyed by the Canadian government following issues of unfair favour, of which one sole paper was found fifty years later by a researcher and given to Duncan. In 1996, Britain issued Alvin and his other radar technician comrades a Certificate of Appreciation following their involvement in the Battle of Britain. Duncan also received alongside the citation for the Battle of Britain plaques from both Dwight D. Eisenhower in 1944, and the House of Commons in 1996.

In 2002, Duncan was nominated for the Heritage and History Award for his work in Oakville's Black History. In the same year, he won the Oakville Community Spirit Award, and was a recipient of the Governor General's Golden Jubilee Medal.
