= Asra Nomani =

American journalist (born 1965)

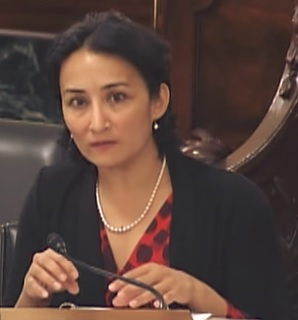
- Nomani at United States House Committee on Homeland Security in 2016
- Born: Asra Quratulain Nomani; June 7, 1965 (age 61); Bombay, Maharashtra, India
- Citizenship: U.S.
- Education: West Virginia University (BA); American University (MA)
- Occupations: Journalist, author, professor
- Children: 1

Asra Quratulain Nomani (born June 7, 1965) is an Indian American journalist and author. Born in India to Muslim parents, she earned a BA from West Virginia University in liberal arts in 1986 and an MA from the American University in international communications in 1990. She subsequently worked as a correspondent for The Wall Street Journal with her colleague Daniel Pearl in Pakistan post-9/11. Pearl was kidnapped and murdered by Islamist terrorists while following an investigative lead. Nomani later became the co-director of the Pearl Project, a faculty-student investigative-reporting project which has looked into Pearl's murder.

Nomani is the author of three books: Standing Alone: An American Woman's Struggle for the Soul of Islam, Tantrika: Traveling the Road of Divine Love, and Woke Army, the Red-Green Alliance that is Destroying America's Freedom. Articles include: "Islamic Bill of Rights for Women in the Bedroom", the "Islamic Bill of Rights for Women in the Mosque", and "99 Precepts for Opening Hearts, Minds and Doors in the Muslim World". She has also written for The Washington Post and has been a returning guest on Real Time with Bill Maher. Her story forms part of the documentary The Mosque in Morgantown, aired nationwide on PBS as part of the series America at a Crossroads.

She is currently a senior contributor to The Federalist. Nomani has described herself as an advocate of Islamic feminism and a critic of Islamism.

== Early life and education ==
Nomani was born in Bombay (now Mumbai), India, to Muslim parents. Her mother Sajida Nomani (c. 1947–) and father Mohammad Zafar Alam Nomani (born 1935–), an Indian nutritionist, were both born in colonial India. Her father was born in Hyderabad, India, where he earned an MSc from the Osmania University, later serving as an assistant professor at the university till 1967.

When she was four years old, Asra Nomani moved to the United States with her older brother to join their parents in New Brunswick, New Jersey, where her father was earning a PhD at Rutgers University. When Nomani was ten, her family moved to Morgantown, West Virginia, where her father became an assistant professor (later professor) of nutrition at West Virginia University. Her father (cited as M.Z.A. Nomani) published studies on the health effects of fasting during Ramadan and also helped organize mosques in both New Jersey and West Virginia.

Nomani received a Bachelor of Arts degree in liberal studies from West Virginia University in 1986 and a Master of Arts from American University in international communications in 1990. She has 1 son.

== Career ==
Nomani is a former The Wall Street Journal correspondent and has written for The Washington Post, The New York Times, Slate, The American Prospect, and Time. She was a correspondent for Salon.com in Pakistan after 9/11, and her work appears in numerous other publications, including People, Sports Illustrated for Women, Cosmopolitan, and Women's Health. She has delivered commentary on National Public Radio.

She was a visiting scholar at the Center for Investigative Journalism at Brandeis University, a Poynter Fellow at Yale University, and a visiting professor in the practice of journalism at Georgetown University's School of Continuing Studies.

Nomani is the founder and creator of the "Muslim Women's Freedom Tour." She was a lead organizer of the woman-led Muslim prayer in New York City on March 18, 2005, which has been described as "the first mixed-gender prayer on record led by a Muslim woman in 1,400 years." Various mixed-gender prayers have been led privately by a Muslim woman, including a 1998 funeral prayer led by a South African Muslim feminist Shamima Shaikh.

In 2015 a group of Muslim activists, politicians, and writers issued a Declaration of Reform which, among other things, supports women's rights and states in part, "We support equal rights for women, including equal rights to inheritance, witness, work, mobility, personal law, education, and employment. Men and women have equal rights in mosques, boards, leadership and all spheres of society. We reject sexism and misogyny." The Declaration also announced the founding of the Muslim Reform Movement organization to work against the beliefs of Middle Eastern terror groups. In 2015 Nomani and others placed the Declaration on the door of the Islamic Center of Washington.

Nomani has argued in favor of government surveillance programs in the fight against Islamic terrorism, saying that society's "sense of political correctness has kept us from sensible law-enforcement strategies that look at Muslims, mosques, and Islamic organizations." She argues the Muslim community does not do a good job of policing itself and that public areas provide a "natural meeting spot for criminals." The leader of the American Islamic Forum for Democracy, Zuhdi Jasser, agreed with Nomani's argument that such spying tactics were warranted. Nomani has also argued in favor of using racial and religious identifiers in threat assessment, saying that a "common denominator" of many terrorists with anti-American views is they were Muslim.

She is the co-founder of Muslims for Peace, and has provided commentary on CNN, NPR, BBC, ABC News Nightline and Al-Jazeera, among others.

On November 11, 2016, on CNN, Nomani revealed that she voted for the Republican candidate Donald Trump, and adding that "liberals and the left have really betrayed America." After Donald Trump signed controversial Executive Order 13769, Nomani said the effort was a continuation of an Obama administration order and stated that referring to the executive order as a "Muslim ban" was a "propaganda campaign" to incite fear in the public.

Nomani is an educational activist. She has opposed critical race theory in education, which she has described as a "divisive ideology".

== Influence ==
In November 2003, Nomani became the first woman in her mosque in West Virginia to insist on the right to pray in the male-only main hall. Her effort brought front-page attention in a New York Times article entitled Muslim Women Seeking a Place in the Mosque.

She helped organize the first public woman-led prayer of a mixed-gender congregation in the United States, with Amina Wadud leading the prayer. On that day, March 18, 2005, she stated:

We are standing up for our rights as women in Islam. We will no longer accept the back door or the shadows, at the end of the day, we'll be leaders in the Muslim world. We are ushering Islam into the 21st century, reclaiming the voice that the Prophet gave us 1400 years ago.

In addition to her books, Nomani has expressed her experiences and ideas for reform in op-eds in The New York Times and in several other publications and broadcasts. She was a friend and colleague of The Wall Street Journal reporter Daniel Pearl, who was staying with her in Karachi with his wife Mariane Pearl when he was abducted and later murdered by Islamic militants in January 2002.

Nomani is portrayed by British actress Archie Panjabi in the film adaptation of Mariane Pearl's book A Mighty Heart. The Washington Post published a review, by Nomani, of the film in which Nomani argued: "...that Danny himself had been cut from his own story."

Nomani is interviewed in a 2005 National Film Board of Canada documentary by Zarqa Nawaz about the efforts of North American Muslim women to be accepted in mosques, entitled Me and the Mosque.

== Impact and reception ==
Regarding the Morgantown mosque issue, Pakistani-American lawyer Asma Gull Hasan, author of Why I Am a Muslim: An American Odyssey, expressed admiration for Nomani, while West Virginia University professor Gamal Fahmy accused Nomani of not being religious and that she was doing this "for profit". Others suggest Nomani's woman-led prayer in 2005 led to open discussion and debate about the role of women in Muslim society. Representatives of some Islamic organizations have criticized Nomani on the Morgantown mosque issue, in part because she has openly criticized commonly accepted practices in the American Muslim community.

Nomani has been profiled by Georgetown University's Bridge Project on Islamophobia.

== Works ==
=== Books ===
- Tantrika: Traveling the Road of Divine Love (2003). ISBN 0-06-251714-7
- Standing Alone: An American Woman's Struggle for the Soul of Islam (2005). ISBN 0-06-057144-6 (Published in India as Standing Alone in Mecca : A Pilgrimage into the Heart of Islam (2013))
- Milestones for a Spiritual Jihad: Toward an Islam of Grace (2010) ISBN 978-0-470-61472-3
- Woke Army: The Red-Green Alliance That Is Destroying America's Freedom (2023). ISBN 978-1-63758-004-2

=== Articles ===
- "The Woman Who Went To the Front of the Mosque", The Washington Post, 5 June 2005
- "A Gender Jihad For Islam's Future", The Washington Post, 6 November 2005
- "As Muslim women, we actually ask you not to wear the hijab in the name of interfaith solidarity", The Washington Post, 21 December 2015
- "I'm a Muslim, a woman and an immigrant. I voted for Trump", The Washington Post, 10 November 2016.
- "My Day in DC: How Leaders like Linda Sarsour are Weaponizing the Media to Foment a Global Campaign Against Jews", Jewish Journal, 23 October 2023

=== Anthologies ===
- Because I Said So, ISBN 0-06-059878-6
