= Kirstine Stewart =

Canadian television executive

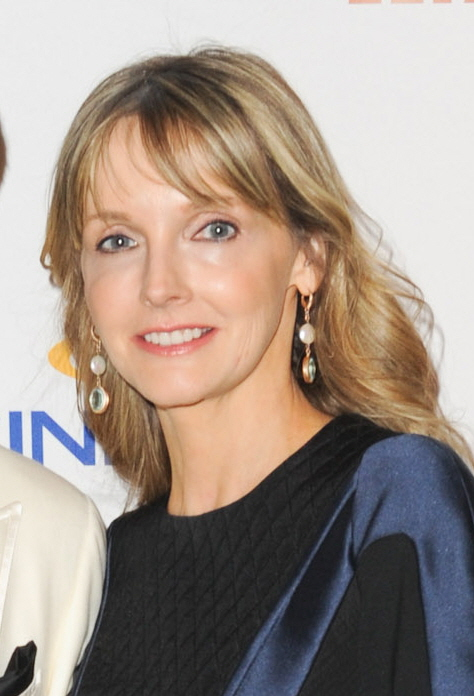
- Kirstine Stewart at the 2013 Canadian Film Centre Annual Gala & Auction, in February 2013
- Born: Ontario, Canada
- Education: University of Toronto (BA)
- Occupation: media executive

Kirstine Stewart (born c. 1968) is a media and tech executive and best-selling author who was formerly the Head of Shaping the Future of Media at the World Economic Forum. Previously she held positions such as the head of the Canadian Broadcasting Corporation, and vice-president of media across North America at Twitter.

Stewart was born in Canada to British emigrants who came to Canada in the 1960s. She is the eldest of their two daughters. She attended Milton District High School, where she was named an Ontario Scholar at age sixteen. Stewart earned a Bachelor of Arts from Erindale College at the University of Toronto in 1988, majoring in English with a minor in business. Stewart is married to Zaib Shaikh, the former star of Little Mosque on the Prairie and who recently served as Consul General for Canada in Los Angeles, Nevada and Arizona.

== Career ==
Stewart became prominent as head of programming for Alliance Atlantis cable channels, including HGTV, Food Network, National Geographic and BBC Canada. Prior, she worked in the United States where she headed up international television broadcasting for Hallmark Channels worldwide.

She then joined the Canadian Broadcasting Corporation in 2006 as executive director of programming for CBC Television. Known as Kirstine Layfield at the time, she later returned to using her birth surname, Stewart.Her tenure with CBC Television was noted for popular series such as Little Mosque on the Prairie, Dragons' Den, The Tudors, Battle of the Blades, Murdoch Mysteries and Being Erica, which revived the network's primetime ratings after a number of years of decline.

On April 29, 2013, Stewart resigned from her position with the CBC after accepting a position at Twitter. She led Twitter's expansion into Canada, and moved to New York where she oversaw North American partnerships across all verticals.

On September 20, 2016, Stewart left her position at Twitter to join the content publisher Diply as their chief strategy officer. Diply was named an EY Young Entrepreneur of the Year, won NextMedia's Digi Awards Company of the Year, and ranked first in Deloitte's Fast50 Tech Growth Companies in Canada.

In 2018 Stewart joined the World Economic Forum as Head of the Future of Media, working with the C Suite of various media and technology companies including Tencent, ByteDance, Meta and others.

Stewart's book Our Turn, published by Random House in 2015, was a national best-seller about business leadership.

She also formerly sat on the board of Kognitiv, theScore, and WOW Entertainment. Stewart was also a member of the DMZ Advisory Council, and a mentor for theBIGPush.. She is currently serving on the boards of Ingenium and the C100 and is Chair of Blink49 Studios.
