= Mary Darling =

Mary Darling may refer to:

- Mary Darling (television producer), CEO and co-owner of WestWind Pictures
- Mary Darling (fictional character), a character in Peter Pan
