= Haris Khan (comedian) =

Canadian comedian and actor (b. 1989)

- Born: Haris Khan; 17 January 1989 (age 37); Karachi, Pakistan

Comedy career
- Years active: 2010 – present
- Medium: Stand-up; television; film; radio; books
- Genres: comedy; observational comedy; improvisational comedy; Ethnic humour
- Subjects: Social issue; Racism; race relations; stereotypes; multiculturalism; Western culture
- Website: www.hariskhan.ca

Haris Khan (born 17 January 1989) is a Canadian comedian. Over the years, he has become known for his ethnically diverse humour, and for his charitable works.

== Early life ==
Khan was born in Pakistan, raised in the Middle East and moved to Canada when he was a teenager. Ever since debuting on the comedy stage in 2010, Haris Khan has performed throughout North America, Europe and the Middle East.

== Career ==
Khan's first solo International tour (Haris Khan & Friends Tour), had sold out shows in Canada, USA, Oman, Pakistan and UAE. He represented Canada Internationally. He is among the few of non-Aboriginal comedians who had performed on First Nation reserves in Canada.

=== Notable performances ===
Haris acted in the TV show Little Mosque on The Prairies and few others shows.

==== Others ====
In additional to performing as a stand-up comedian, Khan had organized fundraisers events and campaigns to support charitable organizations in Canada.

== Comedic style ==
Haris's stand-up performances feature ethnic humour to highlight ideas, beliefs or stereotypes about racial or ethnic groups. He often refers to his own experiences growing up in a Pakistani Canadian family.

== Personal life ==
Haris lives in Regina, Saskatchewan. Both of his parents died due to COVID19 outside of Saskatchewan. On Jan.15, two days before Khan's birthday, his dad died in hospital. Khan began project to feed others during Ramadan in honour of his late father

== Education ==
Khan had graduated from University of Regina with a bachelor of science degree. While studying at the university he served as the elected vice president of external affairs and later as the president & CEO of the University of Regina Student Union.
