= List of Little Mosque on the Prairie episodes =

Little Mosque on the Prairie is a Canadian television sitcom created by Zarqa Nawaz and produced by WestWind Pictures, that originally aired on CBC Television. Little Mosque on the Prairie follows the Muslim population of the fictional rural prairie town of Mercy, Saskatchewan. It premiered on January 9, 2007 and ended on April 2, 2012, with a total of 90 episodes over the course of 6 seasons.

== Series overview ==
Season	Episodes	Originally released	
Season	Episodes	First released	Last released
1	8	January 9, 2007	March 7, 2007
2	20	October 3, 2007	March 5, 2008
3	20	October 1, 2008	March 23, 2009
4	18	September 28, 2009	March 15, 2010
Special		December 6, 2010	
5	13	January 3, 2011	March 28, 2011
6	11	January 9, 2012	April 2, 2012

== Episodes ==
=== Season 1 (2007) ===
No.	Title	Original release date	Prod. code	Can. viewers (millions)
1	"Little Mosque"	January 9, 2007	101	2.07
A small Muslim community in the prairies finally gets its own mosque–the problem is, it's in a church! Reverend Magee, who was tricked into the deal by the scheming Yasir, is suddenly very unpopular with his parishioners. The mosque's new Imam, Amaar Rashid arrives from the big city to smooth things over, but his easy charm and progressive ways do little to convince the locals that Muslims aren't simply a bunch of terrorists. A handshake deal between the new Imam and Reverend Magee ensures that Mercy's Muslims are here to stay.
2	"The Barrier"	January 17, 2007	102	N/A
Baber, Mercy Mosque's conservative voice, decides a barrier must be erected to separate the men and women during prayer. Rayyan protests, convinced the community's liberal voices will prevail. But she has no idea what she's up against. A battle of the sexes ensues and Amaar's compromise ensures that no one will be happy. Meanwhile, Baber continues his long-standing and rather futile campaign to have Layla wear the hijab.
3	"The Open House"	January 31, 2007	103	N/A
What better way to improve your image amongst suspicious townsfolk than to hold an open house at the Mercy Mosque? Amaar enlists Yasir to fix the room's decrepit electrical system before the big day arrives. Of course, the Muslims simply can't agree on what the open house should include. Long-winded history lectures? Islamic dating tips? Muslim munchies? In the end, the turnout is spectacular, but things come to sudden halt when an electrical fire has the guests convinced they're under attack.
4	"Swimming Upstream"	February 6, 2007	104	N/A
Mercy's Muslim women protest co-ed swimming classes at the local pool. Mayor Popowicz refuses to change the rules, nervous at what voters will think if she's seen kowtowing to the Muslims. Meanwhile, Baber refuses to let Layla go out for Halloween, causing Amaar to suggest an Islamic version of the heathen holiday. In the end, the pool remains integrated, but Fatima dons an outrageous bathing suit to ensure she remains fully covered.
5	"The Convert"	February 14, 2007	105	1.11
Marlon, a new white convert, has the entire mosque in a tizzy. Marlon's fanatic embrace of Islam wins an immediate friend in Baber, but he soon alienates everyone by passing judgment on virtually everything the Muslims do. Meanwhile, Sarah, never too devout, decides it's time to become serious about Islam. But her passion soon wanes, even as Marlon's intensifies. Soon the entire mosque is cooking up hair-brained schemes to dampen Marlon's fanatic ways.
6	"Mother-In-Law"	February 21, 2007	106	N/A
Yasir's overbearing mother arrives from Lebanon with an exciting new proposition. Sarah is shocked to find that mother Hamoudi has plans for Yasir to take a second wife! Mayor Popowicz advises Sarah to fight back and take a second husband. Meanwhile, Reverend Magee ponders whether he should perform a gay marriage, amidst the protests of just about everyone. Yasir eventually solves his marital problems with a clever scheme that convinces his mother that one wife is enough.
7	"Playing with Fire"	February 28, 2007	107	1.00
A non-Muslim fireman asks Rayyan out on a date. Baber considers sending Layla to an all-girls Islamic school to protect her from Rayyan's influence and Fatima attempts to dissuade him.
8	"The Archdeacon Cometh"	March 7, 2007	108	1.13
When the Archdeacon announces he's coming to Mercy Anglican, Reverend Magee fears for the worst. With church attendance is way down, and the place just might get shut down. Because the Muslims realize that they have a stake in this as well, Yasir cooks up a scheme to have Muslims pose as Christians to help fill the seats. The archdeacon arrives early and quickly figures out the entire scheme, but he's delighted at the possibilities for the mosque's lucrative rent money.

=== Season 2 (2007–08) ===
No.	Title	Original release date	Prod. code	Can. viewers (millions)
9	"Grave Concern"	October 3, 2007	201	0.75
When a local cemetery is in financial crisis, Baber and Yasir see an opportunity. Why not buy a portion to use as a Muslim cemetery? This will guarantee being buried in the traditional Muslim way: on their right side, facing Mecca. But when they purchase some plots, they realize Mecca isn't the only thing they will spend eternity facing—namely a garish, country music blastin' honky tonk! Meanwhile, Rayyan pushes to have a woman give the mosque’s community announcements. Sarah gets the gig, but her laissez-faire attitude to the facts undermines what should be a victory for Islamic women everywhere.
10	"Ban the Burqa"	October 10, 2007	202	0.78
There's trouble in Mercy when a mystery woman shows up at the mosque wearing a face veil. Sarah finds it oppressive. Fred finds it creepy. Baber falls in love, but doesn't have a way with women so he enlists Yasir to turn him into a ladies' man. Meanwhile, Rayyan defends the woman's right to wear the veil, even if it means contravening an ancient Mercy by-law.
11	"Public Access"	October 17, 2007	203	N/A
Mercy's local public-access television cable TV station asks Amaar to host an Islamic-themed program. But when he brings Rayyan on as a guest and she steals the show, they suddenly find themselves as co-hosts. Sarah can't suppress her PR instincts and gets in on the game. Not to be left out, Yasir finds the show to be a perfect vehicle for some subtle Hamoudi Construction sponsorship. Meanwhile, Layla faces the wrath of her father after a hair dye job goes wrong, and suddenly wearing the hijab doesn't seem like such a bad idea to her.
12	"Lucky Day"	October 24, 2007	204	N/A
Sarah's habit of buying lottery tickets runs her afoul of both Islam and her daughter. Of course, when she actually wins, Sarah and Yasir have to hide it from Rayyan. Meanwhile, Amaar struggles to hip-ify Muslim youth day by re-branding it "Islamapalooza." Eventually, just when the entire day is about to collapse, Amaar receives a sizeable anonymous donation. Sarah mightn't be such a bad Muslim after all.
13	"Mercy Beet"	November 7, 2007	205	N/A
When Toronto Maple Leafs' star Darcy Tucker endorses a brand of beet juice made in Mercy, the company's stock goes through the roof—and Yasir cashes in. Pretty soon the entire town has shares. Sarah helps the Mayor re-brand the town as beet capital of Canada. But will the "beet train" lead them to riches or derail the whole town?
14	"Rival Imam"	November 14, 2007	206	N/A
Amaar's old friend and rival Ali comes to visit Mercy and the competition starts anew. Not only was Ali his rival back at the law firm in Toronto, but upon his arrival, Amaar learns that Ali has also become an Imam. Mercy isn't big enough for the two of them. Meanwhile, a water shortage prompts Rayyan to turn Mercy mosque into the world's first eco-friendly "green mosque." There is only one thing standing in her way—Baber.
15	"Spy Something or Get Out"	November 20, 2007	207	N/A
Suspicions are aroused when Canadian Security Intelligence Service agent Nancy Layton (guest star Samantha Bee) comes to visit Mercy. She says she's here to fish, but Fatima thinks she's up to no good. Amaar argues for common sense: of course the government wouldn't spy on Mercy mosque... would it? Meanwhile, Amaar opens a store in the mosque to sell Islamic merchandise. He enlists Rayyan and Baber to run the store, unleashing Rayyan's competitive nature.
16	"Best Intentions"	November 28, 2007	208	N/A
Baber runs afoul of a little-known Muslim concept: the evil eye. Is his run of bad luck the will of God? Or his own fault? Meanwhile, Rayyan lets her conscience run away with her after inadvertently stealing a chocolate bar from a convenience store.
17	"No Fly List"	December 5, 2007	209	N/A
Baber can't give a keynote speech at a conference in Chicago because he's on the American no fly list. Amaar and Rayyan persuade him to fight the power by taking a daylong road trip to the American consulate. It's too bad the man behind the glass window (Guest Star Dave Foley) insists that they make an appointment first. Back in Mercy, the Mayor wants to put a private bathroom in her office—and Yasir will stop at nothing to get the job.
18	"Eid's a Wonderful Life"	December 12, 2007	210	0.88
Christmas is around the corner and Sarah's blue. She misses the fun and pageantry of her pre-conversion Christmases. Rayyan vows to make this year's Muslim festival, Eid al Adha, a little more Christmasy to cheer up her mom. Meanwhile, the Christmas rush leads to trouble at the mosque, where Amaar and Magee come into conflict over limited parking. At the same time, Baber and Layla are invited to perform a short Islamic play at the school pageant, but the fact that it is forbidden to depict the prophets puts a damper on things. Layla ends up bringing down the house with an interfaith reading from A Christmas Carol.
19	"The Five Year Plan"	December 12, 2007	211	0.88
It's New Year's Eve and Yasir is depressed. Another year's gone by and he hasn't reached the goals he's set for his business. Rayyan throws a dinner to cheer him up, and over dinner Rayyan, Baber, and Amaar share stories of what they were doing exactly five years ago. We see Fred Tupper's first taste of Islam, a pre-hijab Rayyan, a young lawyerly Amaar, and Baber's ex-wife.
20	"Jihad on Ice"	January 9, 2008	212	0.80
When Fred Tupper mocks Amaar's attempts to curl, Amaar sets up Mercy's – and perhaps the world's – first Muslim curling team, the Ice Slammers. Rayyan's got natural talent, but is she so good that the team will lose her? Meanwhile Sarah uses Islamic tradition to get Yasir to pay for a shopping spree. Guest star Peter Wildman as the curling rink manager.
21	"The Crush"	January 16, 2008	213	0.91
There's trouble at Amaar's Koranic studies class when he intercepts a note from Layla indicating she's got a crush on him. He does what any good teacher would do: he runs to Rayyan for help. Sparks really fly when Baber finds out. Eventually Layla informs them that Amaar misread the note, and he'd like to crawl under his desk. Meanwhile, when Yasir and Sarah help Fatima study for her citizenship test, they come close to driving her out of the country.
22	"Welcome to Mercy"	January 23, 2008	214	N/A
Mayor Popowicz goes on vacation, leaving Sarah as acting mayor. Her administration is thrown into crisis when the "Welcome to Mercy" sign at town limits is destroyed in a tractor accident. Sarah takes action to replace the sign, but people take advantage of her goodwill and the town gets a sign with a welcome in every language, except English! With Sarah running the town, Yasir finds himself relegated to "first lady" status. In the meantime, Reverend Magee takes up hobby painting, putting Amaar in the awkward position of pretending to like his art.
23	"Wheat Week"	January 30, 2008	215	0.89
The Mayor wants to scrap "Wheat Week", Mercy's beloved summer festival. It's Sarah's job to find a way to put a positive spin on an unpopular policy. Also, Yasir struggles to enjoy a football match on his new big-screen TV, while Rayyan and Fatima suffer from bad hair days—which can happen, even under a headscarf.
24	"Ear for Trouble"	February 6, 2008	216	0.78
During Ramadan—the Muslim month of fasting—Amaar asks his congregation to give up their faults. For Yasir, it's lying. For Sarah, it's gossip. For Baber, it's anger. Everything conspires against them when a tidbit from Amaar's past emerges and proves to be too big to ignore. Meanwhile, Rayyan and Baber must work together to replace the mosque's worn carpets.
25	"Meet J.J."	February 13, 2008	217	N/A
Yasir is thrilled when he gets a contract to build a pumping substation in Mercy. One snag: he has no idea how to build one. So he brings in outside help: JJ, an engineer and the son of his old friend Kareem. With an undeniable chemistry between Rayyan and JJ, it looks like his presence in Mercy will lead to more than just a job. Meanwhile, Baber forces Layla to build her resume by becoming a summer intern—a move he soon regrets when Fred Tupper takes her under his wing.
26	"Security Alert"	February 20, 2008	218	0.90
Rayyan and JJ have decided to start dating. Now, in accordance with Muslim tradition all they need is a chaperone. Of course, Baber doesn't exactly lend the proceedings a particularly romantic air. Also, Amaar is finding it difficult to sleep at home following a break-in, so Yasir offers his couch. A mix-up in the middle of the night means Amaar sees Rayyan's hair—something that will cause him grief down the road.
27	"Islam on Tap"	February 27, 2008	219	1.02
Rayyan and JJ quarrel over ice cream and the men in her past. Rayyan sees herself as a modern, independent woman and starts to wonder if maybe JJ's jealousy hints that he does not. And Sarah runs afoul of Muslim tradition when she dusts off her tap shoes for a talent contest. Baber is shocked, but Sarah's less than orthodox routine ends up pleasing just about everyone in one way or another.
28	"Marriage Minded"	March 5, 2008	220	0.88
Rayyan and JJ have been dating for a while, and her, under pressure from Yasir, thinks marriage is the next step. JJ agrees. Yasir agrees. JJ's father agrees. There's only one problem: no one's asked Rayyan. Meanwhile, Amaar tries to come to terms with his feelings for Rayyan before it's too late. The episode ends with a shellshocked Amaar waiting to hear if Rayyan accepted JJ's proposal.

=== Season 3 (2008–09) ===
No.	Title	Original release date	Prod. code
29	"Amaar at the Bat"	October 1, 2008	301
When Rayyan tells Amaar that she's accepted JJ's marriage proposal, Amaar is shocked. To make matters worse, he finds that JJ doesn't have a place to stay and will be rooming with him in his apartment. When Amaar realizes just how conflicted he's become, he returns home to Toronto to gather his thoughts, perhaps permanently. Meanwhile, Yasir spills the beans that Rayyan is engaged, only to find how much it means to Sarah to be the purveyor of the good news. Yasir goes on a quest to find someone – anyone – who hasn't heard of Rayyan and JJ's impending nuptials.
30	"Lord of the Ring"	October 8, 2008	302
Back in Toronto, Amaar crashes at his parents' place in Toronto as he tries to decide whether to return to Mercy and resume his job as Imam. Yasir comes to Toronto to help him make the right decision. His parents have other plans, however, and set him up with a dream girl and a dream job at the law firm. Meanwhile, back in Mercy, JJ presents Rayyan with an ostentatious engagement ring which she hates but doesn't have the heart to give back.
31	"A Funny Thing Happened on the Way to Mercy"	October 15, 2008	303
After a spiritual sojourn to Mecca, Amaar returns to Mercy reinvigorated. All is good except that Baber wants to put him through his paces and make him reapply for his job. Meanwhile, with word that JJ's parents are coming to Mercy, Yasir and Sarah are determined to go overboard with plans for a celebratory engagement party, ignoring Rayyan's requests for a simple tea.
32	"The Ties that Blind"	October 22, 2008	304
Determined to get her father out of the house, Layla signs up Baber to a Muslim online dating site. She even sets him up on a blind date with the perfect match. Perfect, that is, until she realizes that it's Fatima! Meanwhile, Sarah's scared that Fred Tupper wants her job after he presents himself as the answer to the Mayor's latest PR debacle. Also, after finding out that his favourite pair of shoes have been unwittingly stolen by a cantankerous blind Muslim man, Amaar is determined to get them back.
33	"Rules R Rules"	October 29, 2008	305
When Amaar is short on cash, Sarah talks Yasir into giving Amaar a part-time job as his assistant. Everyone quickly learns that his hammering skills are not quite as good as his lawyering skills. Meanwhile, Rayyan and JJ team up to baffle Fred with made-up rules about Islam. But when they discover Fred's spreading the false rules on the air, they've got to convince an unbelieving Fred that they misled him.
34	"Let Prairie Dogs Lie"	November 5, 2008	306
Yasir joins the Prairie Dog Lodge to make new business contacts, but quickly finds that he can't participate in many of their activities like gambling and drinking. Things get worse when Amaar learns that Yasir is going to join them on a hunting trip—a sport that is forbidden by Islam. The problem is "solved" when Yasir accidentally shoots their revered mascot. Meanwhile, Rayyan, disappointed after finding out that Sarah wouldn't hypothetically pair up with her for the reality show "Stranded," is determined to prove herself to her mother. Hijinks ensue when they get stranded for real.
35	"Sweet Sixteen"	November 19, 2008	307
When Baber is found without a gift for his daughter for her surprise sweet 16th birthday party, Yasir proposes to help Baber write a poem for Layla. Baber agrees, but Sarah soon reveals that Yasir's poetry is terrible. Meanwhile, Rayyan and Amaar must rescue Layla from the secular booze and boys party her high school friends are throwing. Also, Fred must repair his "relationship" with Fatima when she discovers that he tried lunch at a different diner.
36	"Mercy Dot Com"	November 26, 2008	308
When Fatima notices that a new breed of laptop-toting cheapskate customers have displaced her regulars, Fatima discovers that the wi-fi signal from the Happy Unicorn Good Earth Food store is behind it all. Meanwhile, Amaar feels threatened by an advice-giving website, but soon realizes he can go online as an advisor. Soon enough, he becomes obsessed with proving himself to the virtual community at the expense of the real community. Also, Yasir and Sarah buy what turns out to be a historically significant house for Rayyan and J.J. to induce them to stay in Mercy after their marriage, but they claim that they've purchased the house to flip.
37	"A Hard Day's Fight"	December 3, 2008	309
When JJ reveals he's been called back to Dubai, tension mounts between him and Rayyan. Yasir and Sarah come to the rescue, determined to ensure a fond farewell between the young couple. Meanwhile, when Baber takes a substitute position at Layla's high school, she's worried that her father may become a permanent addition to the faculty.
38	"Baber is from Mars, Vegans are from Venus"	January 5, 2009	310
When Sarah needs a partner for a charity marathon, she must choose between Rayyan and Yasir. Things get more complicated when she invites them both, and they both accept. Meanwhile, Baber has learned to enjoy the halal delights offered by the Happy Unicorn Good Earth Food store. Unfortunately, he must ban Layla from visiting the new health food store because of her interest in the store's handsome young clerk, Tree. Baber is then himself banned for his backwards values, robbing him of his much beloved alcohol-free vanilla extract
39	"True Bromance"	January 12, 2009	311
Amaar befriends a reporter new to the Mercy area but this friendship is tested when the two wind up in jail. Yasir wins an award but gets in trouble with Sarah.
40	"Double Troubles"	January 19, 2009	312
Amaar is enlisted by a friend to go on a double date but finds his confidence somewhat shaken by the outcome. Yasir gets a new job.
41	"The Week of Dying Dangerously"	January 26, 2009	313
Fred gets some unsettling news from a visit to Rayyan's clinic and decides to change his life radically as a result with his rocky relationship with the local Muslim community the first thing to be changed. Layla attempts to learn to drive.
42	"Raised Expectations"	February 9, 2009	314
Amaar's attempts to get a raise for himself fail and Fred decides to help him by pursuing the matter on his own. Sarah attempts to get into the paper.
43	"Colour Me Excited"	February 16, 2009	315
J.J. tells Rayyan that his parents have bought them an island in Dubai and the couple try to decide whether to live in Dubai or stay in Mercy. Meanwhile, Sarah and Yasir secretly decorate the interior of Rayyan and J.J.'s home in Mercy. Amaar has an Islamic knowledge contest.
44	"Recipe for Disaster"	February 23, 2009	316
Yasir says he is too busy to attend a marriage workshop with Sarah but soon comes to regret his decision. After Layla and Fred steal Fatima's prized lamb recipe to enter on a food magazine's website, Fatima closes her cafe.
45	"My Shariah"	March 2, 2009	317
J.J. opens an early wedding present but has no idea what the gift is and neither does anybody else. Amaar distances himself from Duncan. Baber restructures everyone's investments to be shariah compliant.
46	"Baber Makes an Entrance"	March 9, 2009	318
To prove his religious credentials, Baber insists that the Muslim women enter the mosque through a separate entrance. The women rebel, and Amaar tries to change the terms of the debate. Sarah loses her gift for gab and gets a tempting job offer.
47	"Meet the Jaffers"	March 16, 2009	319
J.J.'s parents arrive from Dubai for the wedding with their Rolls-Royce. J.J.'s mother is difficult, but finally tells Rayyan a huge secret, swearing her to secrecy. This causes Amaar to think Rayyan wants to call off the wedding. Yasir has to negotiate the mahr (dowry) with JJ's father. Baber's hobbies require him to fumigate the mosque.
48	"Can I Get a Witness?"	March 23, 2009	320
J.J. and Rayyan's wedding date arrives and chaos threatens to unravel what should be a joyous occasion. Fred helps the mosque out in a time of need. J.J.'s mother surprises Rayyan.

=== Season 4 (2009–10) ===
No.	Title	Original release date	Prod. code
49	"Love Thy Neighbour"	September 28, 2009	401
Rev. Magee's replacement, Rev. William Thorne, wants Amaar and the Muslims out until he realizes his congregants like having the mosque around. Rayyan dances to country music in her wedding dress and returns gifts; one of them in which leads her to call J.J one last time.
50	"Big Boys Don't Cry"	October 5, 2009	402
When Amaar invites Rev. Thorne to co-host a party, the minister hijacks the planning and almost tanks the event. Yasir hires a new employee, Yusuf, who does not speak English, and tries to set him up with Rayyan. Rayyan gets revenge by pretending that she will marry Yusuf.
51	"What's Yours Is Mine"	October 12, 2009	403
Rev. Thorne is stealing Amaar's sermons and preaching them to his own congregation. Rayyan decides to move out, much to her father's dismay.
52	"Break and Enter"	October 19, 2009	404
After Rayyan bans pop-in visits, Sarah sneaks into Rayyan's house to retrieve her emergency key and gets trapped inside. Thorne tries to convert the Muslims to Christianity.
53	"Death By Chocolate"	October 26, 2009	405
When Reverend Thorne installs a chocolate vending machine during Amaar's 30-hour famine fundraiser, Amaar is forced to fight temptation with faith. Yasir, Sarah, Nate and the mayor enter a car contest.
54	"The Bid"	November 2, 2009	406
Yasir stops at nothing to win the church renovation with Rev. Thorne and ends up losing his shirt. Rayyan saves Fred's life, and he won't leave her alone.
55	"Handle With Care"	November 9, 2009	407
Yasir accidentally breaks Thorne's Jesus statue, and tries to replace it before he's discovered. Layla moves in with Rayyan.
56	"Saving Sarah Hamoudi"	November 23, 2009	408
When Sarah agrees to help Thorne with raising the church's profile, Amaar recruits Nate to help boost the mosque's PR. Yasir and Baber scheme to get Layla to move back with Baber.
57	"Gloves Will Keep Us Together"	November 30, 2009	409
Rev. Thorne tricks Amaar into a charity boxing match.
58	"Bye Bye Yasir"	January 4, 2010	410
Amaar is dumbfounded when he learns Reverend Thorne is faking injuries sustained from the charity boxing match in an effort to make Amaar look bad and generate sympathy for Thorne.
59	"The Great Indoors"	January 11, 2010	411
Amaar and Reverend Thorne become lost during a camping trip in the woods. During their struggle to find the way home, the two discover they have more in common than either believed previously.
60	"Pants on Fire"	January 18, 2010	412
The mayor fires Sarah for lying at an inopportune time. Sarah is determined to get her job back and hatches a scheme to do just that.
61	"The Letter"	January 25, 2010	413
Amaar accidentally reads a letter addressed to Rev. Thorne and learns more than he wants about his Anglican colleague.
62	"Holly Go Quickly"	February 1, 2010	414
After Baber scolds her for turning her back on her best friend, Holly, in college, Rayyan feels determined to invite her back into her life. The only problem is that Holly has become an ardent Christian zealot persistent on saving Rayyan's soul from the Fires of Hell.
63	"Radio Silence"	February 8, 2010	415
Thorne encourages Baber to get a radio show hoping his extreme views will stir up anti-Muslim feelings. When Thorne's plan works, Amaar conspires with unlikely ally Fred to get Baber off the air. Meanwhile, Sarah befriends a male subcontractor and sets tongues wagging. But when this relationship heats up, Sarah has to find a way to put the gossip to rest.
64	"Keeping the Faith"	March 1, 2010	416
Amaar is pressured by Babar to ban the wearing of pants by women in the mosque, a demand Rayyan finds offensive. Amaar listens to Rayyan, but this leads to Ammar getting fired. Meanwhile, Sarah and Mayor Popowicz team up and enter the Annual Mercy Chili Cookoff, and soon find themselves up to their necks in their attempt to win.
65	"A Farewell to Amaars"	March 8, 2010	417
When Baber takes over as Imam after getting Amaar fired, he allows a band of radical Muslims into the mosque. But he gets more than he bargained for when the fundamentalists take over and frighten the Anglicans, finally giving Thorne the excuse he needs to act.
66	"A Lease Too Far"	March 15, 2010	418
Thorne evicts the Muslims from the church and they are forced to find another suitable place to pray. Meanwhile, the Archbishop visits and is very excited about seeing the mosque. Thorne asks the Muslims to come back; they accept. Rayyan tells Amaar she loves him and he tells her he loves her.

=== Season 5 (2011) ===
No.	Title	Original release date	Prod. code
67	"The Proposal"	January 3, 2011	501
Amaar searches for the perfect way to propose to Rayyan after getting Yasir's permission to marry his daughter. Sarah volunteers to help but soon what is supposed to be the most magical night ever becomes a series of comic misfires. Rev. Thorne finds the town has turned on him after his bad behaviour toward the Muslims. He then tries to find a new way to fit in. Viewers: 593,000
68	"Bromancing the Imam"	January 10, 2011	502
Amaar babysits with Rayyan, who is trying to convince him to include children in their future. She begins to develop doubts about being a mother when the baby they are watching takes to Amaar but not her. Meanwhile, Rev. Thorne tries to become Amaar's friend with Sarah's help, but his plan backfires. Viewers: 477,000
69	"Kept Imam"	January 17, 2011	503
Amaar, fearing he's taking advantage of Rayyan's generosity, struggles with the fact he won't be much of a bread-winner and shocks his fiancée with a pre-nuptial agreement. Viewers: 452,000
70	"Loose Lips"	January 24, 2011	504
When Amaar shares a funny little quirk of Raayan's to show a congregant that all couples disagree about some things, Rayyan is not amused and forbids him from saying anything else. Meanwhile, Sarah convinces Baber to pose as her boss in an attempt to land a conservative Muslim as a client for Hamoudi Construction.
71	"Roomies"	January 31, 2011	505
A leak in the roof of Amaar's loft results in the Imam reluctantly staying with Thorne, who enjoys having Amaar there. When Amaar doesn't feel the same, a hurt Thorne sets out to ensure that Amaar has nowhere else to go. Meanwhile, Sarah fights off aging to the point of injury to impress an old friend who stops by Mercy for a visit.
72	"Smooth Hate Criminal"	February 7, 2011	506
Rayyan urges Amaar to befriend a lonely Rev. Thorne but quickly finds herself shut out when the former frenemies find much in common. Meanwhile, when a mishap at the mosque is misread as a hate crime, Sarah covers for the Mayor until she has to come clean and mend fences between the Anglicans and the Muslims.
73	"Brother, Can You Spare a Mosque?"	February 14, 2011	507
The excitement of their first joint purchase is ruined when Rayyan discovers that Amaar heard her snoring as she tried out mattresses. Meanwhile, Sarah, Thorne and Baber try to outdo each other in the charity department when a man down on his luck passes through town.
74	"Every Thorne has its Rose"	February 21, 2011	508
Suspicious of Thorne's odd behavior, Rayyan quickly discovers that he's fallen for Mercy's quirky librarian, Rose. Despite Amaar's pleas for her not to interfere, Rayyan's matchmaking efforts almost sink the blossoming relationship. Meanwhile, Sarah and Fatima's friendship is tested when Fatima hires Sarah to do renovations in the café.
75	"Love at First Fight"	February 28, 2011	509
Urged on by the women of the mosque, Rayyan runs for the board. But her victory is short-lived when Baber finds a clause in the constitution forbidding women from participating. Worse yet, Amaar agrees to uphold the constitution, no matter how upset Rayyan is. Meanwhile, Thorne enlists Sarah to help him connect with the people of Mercy and she loses her newfound friends to him.
76	"An Arranged Marriage"	March 7, 2011	510
When Yasir announces his impending return, Amaar and Rayyan seize the opportunity of his visit to set a wedding date. They soon discover they don’t have time to plan a big wedding and turn the event over to Sarah, who goes over the top with arrangements they don't love. Meanwhile, the only way Thorne can get Baber to help with his tax problem is to convince cranky Fred to do a favour for Baber.
77	"The Bachelor Party"	March 14, 2011	511
Rev. Thorne is jealous when Rev. Magee throws a bachelor party for Amaar. Determined not to be outdone by his Anglican nemesis, Thorne organizes a paintball party to settle the score with Magee on the battlefield. Meanwhile, Sarah comes to the rescue after Rayyan gets locked out of her bachelorette party sans hijab and gets stranded on the edge of town.
78	"If You Leave Me Now"	March 21, 2011	512
Having mastered his work at the mosque, Amaar has devoted himself to good works volunteering for Islamic Assistance International and is thrilled when they offer him a full-time job. But that joy is tempered with sadness when he realizes the job would take him to Montreal and that Rayyan isn't sure she wants to move. Meanwhile, Sarah and the Mayor become convinced a new doctor in town is trying to steal Rayyan's practice.
79	"Amaar's Well That Ends Well"	March 28, 2011	513
Not wanting to cast a pall over their special day, Amaar and Rayyan decide to wait until after the wedding to let their family and friends know they're moving to Montreal. But Baber overhears their juicy news and lets it slip at the worst possible moment. Everyone's shocked reaction threatens to derail the special occasion. Meanwhile, Yasir feels left out and struggles to find his role in the family and in town.

=== Season 6 (2012) ===
On February 11, 2011, it was announced that CBC had renewed the series for a sixth and final season. The final season began airing on January 9, 2012 and consisted of 11 episodes.

No.	Title	Original release date	Prod. code
80	"Home Again"	January 9, 2012	601
Sarah and Rayyan help each other come to terms with Sarah's divorce from Yasir, who has decided to remain in Lebanon. Meanwhile, Amaar tries to sort out his imam-related issues with Baber and Thorne once and for all.
81	"What's in a Name"	January 16, 2012	602
Amaar tries to solve Rayyan's problems at work with her new receptionist Poppy, but it causes Rayyan to become extremely stressed at home. Meanwhile, Ann takes Sarah out for a ladies night at a local bar while Baber and Thorne compete for Sarah's religious allegiance.
82	"Short Fuse"	January 23, 2012	603
Amaar tries to impress Rayyan with his non-existent handyman skills, which results in secretly recruiting Sarah for her do-it-yourself expertise to get the job done. When Rayyan become suspicious of Amaar's ability to suddenly fix things, she volunteers him to fix Fred's shower. Baber and Thorne challenge each other to a fasting competition that escalates to insane heights, even for them.
83	"The Dating Game"	January 30, 2012	604
Amaar gets close to winning a Multi-Faith Award and Baber and Thorne fight over the cash prize. Meanwhile, Ann sets Sarah up on the worst first-date of her life, which leads to the worst second-date of her life. And Nate and Fatima team up to make a multi-ethnic sandwich.
84	"Brotherly Love"	February 6, 2012	605
Thorne's brother Charles arrives in Mercy to audit Ann for Revenue Canada and reconcile with Thorne, who just wants him to go away. Amaar and Rayyan's first dinner party is interrupted when Amaar tries something fancy.
85	"Destination Chicken"	February 13, 2012	606
Amaar unexpectedly gets a sign from above after Baber tries to help Amaar find his new purpose. Meanwhile, Ann’s crush on Charles fuels old sibling rivalries when she encourages her new flame to help out with Rev. Thorne’s Destination Church Spectacular. Sarah is left to deal with the town audit single-handed.
86	"Mosque of Dreams"	February 20, 2012	607
Everyone finds out Amaar's inspiration for his new mosque came from a chicken, which leads to a drop in public support, while Baber tries to prove to the town they don't need another mosque by getting himself arrested. Sarah has a crisis of faith and considers eating bacon, while Ann suffers a crisis of love while sexting the now absent Charles Thorne.
87	"Finder Weepers"	March 5, 2012	608
Feeling undervalued by Ann, Sarah agrees to work for Ann's college "frenemy" Glenda Beckford, the mayor of Darnelly, without knowing that Glenda has ulterior motives for hiring her. Meanwhile, Amaar is so busy planning the new mosque that he forgets Rayyan's birthday and Baber and Thorne compete for more customers as the mosque-church's last rummage sale.
88	"Haunted Mosque on the Prairie"	March 12, 2012	609
Amaar accidentally leads everyone to believe the new mosque is haunted by referring to a "dead body" found in the mosque (a hamster), so Sarah suggests that he and Rayyan spend a night there to prove it isn't haunted. Thorne helps Baber overcome his irrational fear of jinn, Muslim ghosts, by watching the movie "Ghostbusters." Nate goes to extreme lengths to ask Poppy out on a date.
89	"The Worst of Times"	March 26, 2012	610
Amaar reveals that he will be imam of the new mosque, so Baber forms a splinter mosque. Ann is upset about Charles's upcoming wedding, so Sarah helps her take suggestive photos of herself. When Sarah attempts to rejoin the church choir and accidentally sets fire to the church, everyone gathers and watches the church burn down.
90	"Best of Times"	April 2, 2012	611
The new mosque opens, with Amaar as imam. Charles breaks off his wedding for Ann and they agree to marry in the new mosque. Meanwhile, Sarah resolves that she will be Muslim, Baber struggles to reconcile with the new mosque and helps Thorne find a way to stay in town after the church has been burned down. Amidst everything going on, Rayyan has something important to tell Amaar.

== Special (2010) ==
Title	Original release date
"A Holiday Story"	December 6, 2010
Amaar recounts his first Christmas in Mercy to Rev. Thorne after a tussle over their shared space reminds Amaar of the growing pains he had at the mosque as a rookie imam. Meanwhile, Yasir upsets Sarah when he stuffs Hamoudi Construction invoices into her Christmas cards as a cost-cutting measure.
