= Clark Donnelly =

- Born: Canada
- Occupations: Businessperson, television producer
- Spouse: Mary Darling

Clark Donnelly co-founded WestWind Pictures in 1989, leaving a post as vice-president of Regina's CKCK Television where he had worked for fifteen years. The company began by producing high-end, 16mm and 35mm commercial work, but quickly moved into series and documentary production. Donnelly has been intimately involved in the creative and overall development and production of most of their subsequent work.

Donnelly has many television credits to his name. This includes What on Earth for the CBC network, Family and Friends for the LIFE Network, This Small Space and Love by Design which both play on HGTV in the U.S. and Canada and Designer Guys which has sold to over thirty countries. His company has also produced English Teachers for the LIFE Network, Wild Lives and Time & Place for Discovery Canada, @ Wood River Hall for Vision TV, Shot in the Face for Movie Central and TMN and the award-winning variety special Youkali Hotel for CBC Television.

In addition, Donnelly has written, produced or executive-produced a string of documentaries on topics ranging from art and religion, to children and divorce. He and his wife Mary Darling are working to expand the company further into series and long-form drama production the first of which is Little Mosque on the Prairie.
