= Aminah Assilmi =

American journalist (1945–2010)

- Born: Janice Huff; 1945
- Died: March 5, 2010 (aged 64–65)
- Occupation: American broadcast journalist

Aminah Assilmi (born Janice Huff, 1945 – 5 March 2010) was an American broadcast journalist, national Muslim community activist and director of the International Union of Muslim Women.

Formerly a Southern Baptist preacher, she converted to Islam in 1977 in college while trying to convert some Muslims to Christianity. As the director of the International Union of Muslim Women she visited campuses discussing Islam. She was named one of the 500 most influential Muslims in the world in 2009 by the Royal Islamic Strategic Studies Centre in Amman, Jordan.

Assilmi was involved in the release of the 2001 Eid stamp, as well as future anniversary editions.

Assilmi died on March 5, 2010, in a car accident while returning from a speaking engagement in New York with her youngest son. She also had several grandchildren. Since then, her daughter has continued in her mother's footsteps teaching a drug free program her mother taught for 30 years.

She appears in the 2005 National Film Board of Canada documentary film about North American Muslim women, Me and the Mosque.
