= Zaib Shaikh =

Canadian actor

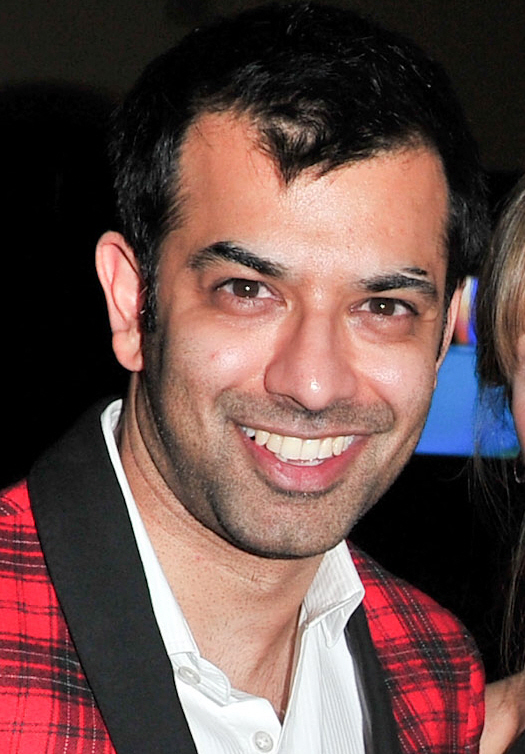
- Shaikh in 2012

Consul General of Canada in Los Angeles
- In office December 3, 2018 – November 14, 2025
- Prime Minister: Justin Trudeau; Mark Carney
- Preceded by: James Villeneuve
- Succeeded by: Kamal Khera

Toronto Film Commissioner and Director of Entertainment Industries
- In office 2014–2018
- Preceded by: position established

Personal details
- Born: May 25, 1974 (age 52) Toronto, Ontario, Canada
- Spouse: Kirstine Stewart (m. 2011)
- Education: University of Toronto (MFA); Sheridan College (BA); University of British Columbia
- Occupation: Actor, writer, director, diplomat
- Known for: Star of Little Mosque on the Prairie

Zaib Shaikh (born May 25, 1974) is a Canadian actor, writer, and director. He also served as Canada's Consul General in Los Angeles.

== Career ==
Shaikh has appeared in Metropia and Little Mosque on the Prairie, and as Vancouver city councillor Shakil Khan in Da Vinci's City Hall. He is co-founder of the Whistler Theatre Project, and also writer and director of the CBC adaptation of Othello. He appeared as Nadir Khan in Deepa Mehta's film adaptation of Midnight's Children. He guest starred as Professor Mahmoud Bahmanyaron in an episode of Murdoch Mysteries which aired March 18, 2013.

== Personal life ==
Shaikh was born in Toronto, Ontario, and is of Pakistani descent. He studied theatre at the Mississauga campus of the University of Toronto and has a Bachelor of Arts from Sheridan College. While at U of T, Shaikh was a copy editor for the Mississauga campus newspaper, The Medium. He has a Master of Fine Arts degree from U of T.

Since 2011, Shaikh has been married to Kirstine Stewart, former managing director of Twitter Canada.

On May 29, 2014, Shaikh was named the film commissioner and director of entertainment industries for the City of Toronto.

== Filmography ==
=== Film ===
Year	Title	Role	Notes
1998	Shepherd	Cook	
2007	Hello Faye	Shiraz	Short film
2012	Midnight's Children	Nadir Khan	

=== Television ===
Year	Title	Role	Notes
2004	Doc	Salesman	Episode: "Leader of the Band"
2004–2005	Metropia	Jayesh	
2005–2006	Da Vinci's City Hall	Councillor Shakil Khan	7 episodes
2006	The Dead Zone	Hit Man	Episode: "Lotto Fever"
2007–2012	Little Mosque on the Prairie	Amaar Rashid	91 episodes
2013	Murdoch Mysteries	Professor Mahmoud Bahmanyar	Episode: "Twisted Sisters"
