= Fugitive slave laws in the United States =

Laws passed by the United States Congress in 1793 and 1850

The fugitive slave laws were laws passed by the United States Congress in 1793 and 1850 to provide for the return of slaves who escaped from one state into another state or territory. The idea of the fugitive slave law was derived from the Fugitive Slave Clause which is in the United States Constitution (Article IV, Section 2, Paragraph 3). It was thought that forcing states to return fugitive slaves to their masters violated states' rights due to state sovereignty, and that seizing state property should not be left up to the states. The Fugitive Slave Clause states that fugitive slaves "shall be delivered up on Claim of the Party to whom such Service or Labour may be due", which abridged state rights because apprehending runaway slaves was a form of retrieving private property. The Compromise of 1850 entailed a series of laws that allowed slavery in the new territories and forced officials in free states to give a hearing to slave-owners without a jury.

== Pre-colonial and colonial eras ==
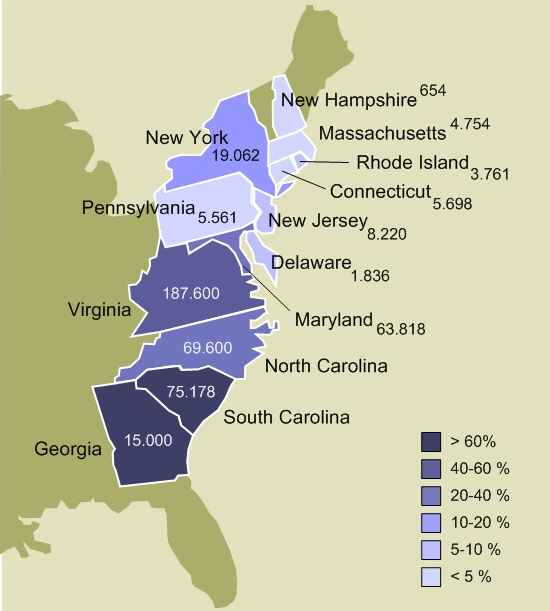
Slavery in the 13 colonies, 1770. Numbers show actual and estimated slave population by colony. Colors show the slave population as a percentage of each colony's total population. Boundaries shown are based on 1860 state boundaries, not those of 1770 colonies.

The New England Articles of Confederation of 1643 contained a clause that provided for the return of fugitive slaves. However, this only referred to the confederation of colonies of Massachusetts, Plymouth, Connecticut, and New Haven, and was unrelated to the Articles of Confederation of the United States formed after the Declaration of Independence. There were African and Native American slaves in New England beginning in the 17th century. The Articles for the New England Confederation provided for the return of slaves in Section 8:

It is also agreed that if any servant ran away from his master into any other of these confederated Jurisdictions, that in such case, upon the certificate of one magistrate in the Jurisdiction out of which the said servant fled, or upon other due proof; the said servant shall be delivered, either to his master, or any other that pursues and brings such certificate or proof.

As the colonies expanded with waves of settlers pushing westward, slavery continued in the English territories and in former Dutch territories like New Amsterdam, prompting further legislation of a similar nature. Serious attempts at formulating a uniform policy for the capture of escaped slaves began under the Articles of Confederation of the United States in 1785.

== 1785 attempt ==
There were two attempts at implementing a fugitive slave law in the Congress of the Confederation.

The Ordinance of 1784 was drafted by a Congressional committee headed by Thomas Jefferson, and its provisions applied to all United States territory west of the original 13 states. The original version was read to Congress on March 1, 1784, and it contained a clause stating:

That after the year 1800 of the Christian Era, there shall be neither slavery nor involuntary servitude in any of the said states, otherwise than in punishment of crimes, whereof the party shall have been duly convicted to have been personally guilty.

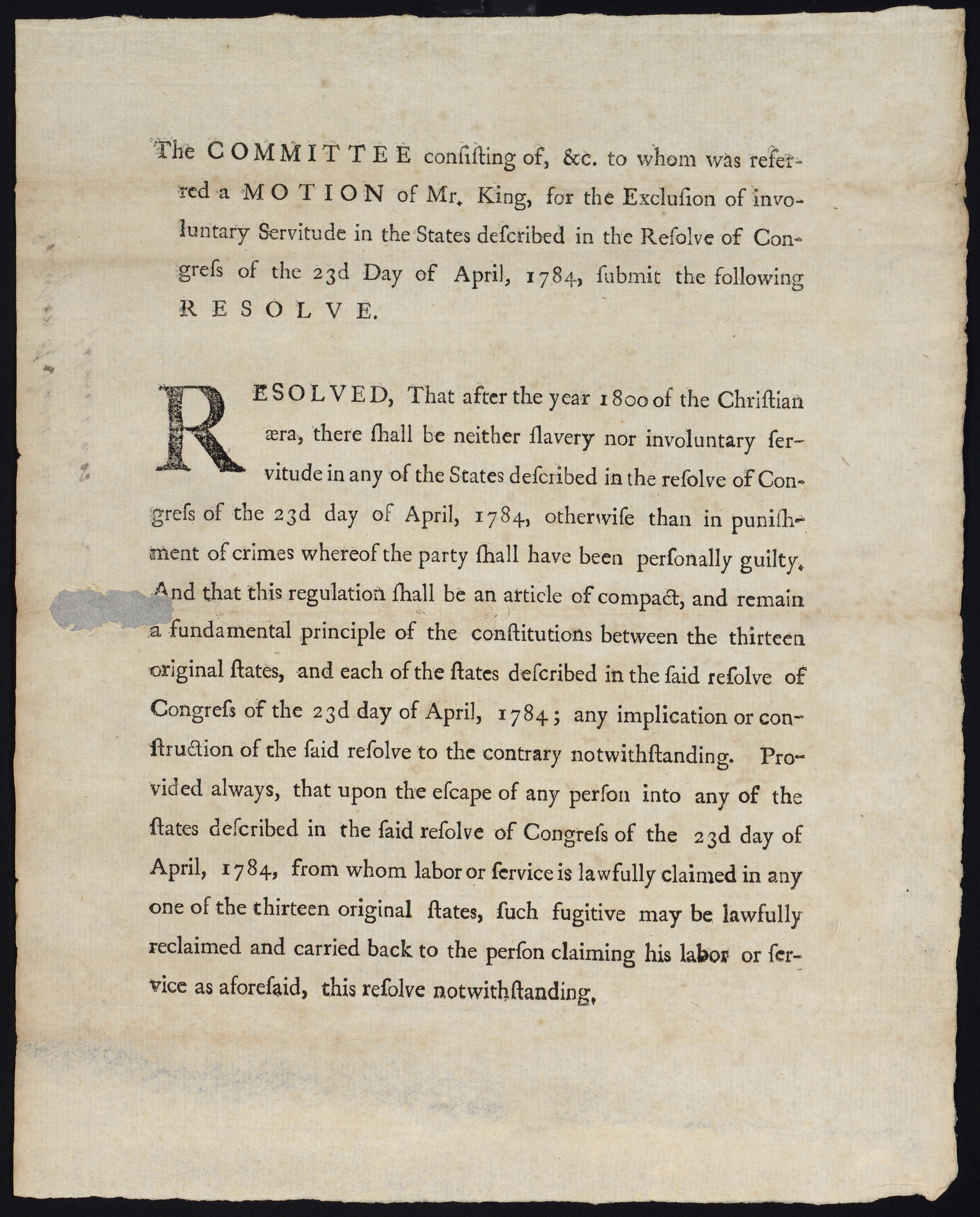
Rufus King's failed resolution to re-implement the slavery prohibition in the Ordinance of 1784.

This was removed prior to final enactment of the ordinance on 23 April 1784. However, the issue did not die there, and on 6 April 1785 Rufus King introduced a resolution to re-implement the slavery prohibition in the 1784 ordinance, containing a fugitive slave provision in the hope that this would reduce opposition to the objective of the resolution. The resolution contained the phrase:

Provided always, that upon the escape of any person into any of the states described in the said resolve of Congress of the 23d day of April, 1784, from whom labor or service is lawfully claimed in any one of the thirteen original states, such fugitive may be lawfully reclaimed and carried back to the person claiming his labor or service as aforesaid, this resolve notwithstanding.

While the original 1784 ordinance applied to all U.S. territory that was not a part of any existing state (and thus, to all future states), the 1787 ordinance applied only to the Northwest Territory.

== Northwest Ordinance of 1787 ==
Congress made a further attempt to address the concerns of slave owners in 1787 by passing the Northwest Ordinance of 1787. The law appeared to outlaw slavery, which would have reduced the votes of slave states in Congress, but southern representatives were concerned with economic competition from potential slaveholders in the new territory, and the effects that would have on the prices of staple crops such as tobacco. They correctly predicted that slavery would be permitted south of the Ohio River under the Southwest Ordinance of 1790, and therefore did not view this as a threat. In terms of the actual law, it did not ban slavery in practice, and it continued almost until the start of the Civil War.

King's phrasing from the 1785 attempt was incorporated in the Northwest Ordinance of 1787 when it was enacted on 13 July 1787. Article 6 has the provision for fugitive slaves:

Art. 6. There shall be neither slavery nor involuntary servitude in the said territory, otherwise than in the punishment of crimes whereof the party shall have been duly convicted: Provided, always, That any person escaping into the same, from whom labor or service is lawfully claimed in any one of the original States, such fugitive may be lawfully reclaimed and conveyed to the person claiming his or her labor or service as aforesaid.

== Fugitive Slave Act of 1793 ==
In 1793, Congress passed "An Act respecting fugitives from justice, and persons escaping from the service of their masters", or more commonly known as the Fugitive Slave Act, to fulfill the Article IV requirement to return escaped slaves.

Section 3 mandates the return of fugitives:

SEC. 3. ... That when a person held to labor in any of the United States, or of the Territories on the Northwest or South of the river Ohio ... shall escape into any other part of the said States or Territory, the person to whom such labor or service may be due ... is hereby empowered to seize or arrest such fugitive from labor ... and upon proof ... before any Judge ... it shall be the duty of such Judge ... [to remove] the said fugitive from labor to the State or Territory from which he or she fled.

Section 4 makes assisting runaways and fugitives a crime and outlines the punishment for those who assisted runaway slaves:

SEC. 4. ... That any person who shall knowingly and willingly obstruct or hinder such claimant ... shall ... forfeit and pay the sum of five hundred dollars.

An unintended result of the hunt for fugitives was that some free blacks were illegally kidnapped and sold into slavery, despite having "free" papers due to high demand for slaves in the Deep South. Many people, who were legally free and had never been slaves, were captured and brought south to be sold into slavery. The historian Carol Wilson documented 300 such cases in Freedom at Risk (1994) and estimated there were likely thousands of others.

In the early 19th century, personal liberty laws were passed to hamper officials in the execution of the law, but this was mostly after the abolition of the Slave Trade, as there had been very little support for abolition prior; Indiana in 1824 and Connecticut in 1828 provided jury trial for fugitives who appealed from an original decision against them. In 1840, New York and Vermont extended the right of trial by jury to fugitives and provided them with attorneys. As early as the first decade of the 19th century, individual dissatisfaction with the law of 1793 had taken the form of systematic assistance rendered to African Americans escaping from the South to Canada or New England: the so-called Underground Railroad.

The decision of the Supreme Court in the case of Prigg v. Pennsylvania in 1842 (16 Peters 539)—that state authorities could not be forced to act in fugitive slave cases, but that national authorities must carry out the national law—was followed by legislation in Massachusetts (1843), Vermont (1843), Pennsylvania (1847) and Rhode Island (1848), forbidding state officials from aiding in enforcing the law and refusing the use of state jails for fugitive slaves.

== Fugitive Slave Act of 1850 ==
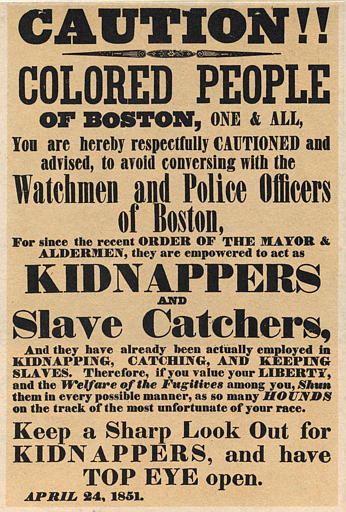
Massachusetts had abolished slavery in 1783, but the Fugitive Slave Law of 1850 required government officials to assist slavecatchers in capturing fugitives within the state.

The demand from the South for more effective Federal legislation led to the second fugitive slave law, drafted by Senator James Murray Mason of Virginia, grandson of George Mason, and enacted on September 18, 1850, as a part of the Compromise of 1850. Special commissioners were to have concurrent jurisdiction with the U.S. circuit and district courts and the inferior courts of territories in enforcing the law; fugitives could not testify in their own behalf; no trial by jury was provided. The person claiming to be the slaves' owner could determine whether the slave was believable, and most times they were sent back to slavery.

Penalties were imposed upon marshals who refused to enforce the law or from whom a fugitive should escape, and upon individuals who aided black people to escape; the marshal might raise a posse comitatus; a fee of $10 (equivalent to $387 in 2025) was paid to the commissioner when his decision favored the claimant, only $5 (equivalent to $194 in 2025) when it favored the fugitive. The supposed justification for the disparity in compensation was that, if the decision were in favor of the claimant, additional effort on the part of the commissioner would be required in order to fill out the paperwork actually remanding the slave back to the South. Both the fact of the escape and the identity of the fugitive were determined on purely ex parte testimony. If a slave was brought in and returned to the master, the person who brought in the slave would receive the sum of $10 (equivalent to $387 in 2025) per slave.

The severity of this measure led to gross abuses and defeated its purpose; the number of abolitionists increased, the operations of the Underground Railroad became more efficient, and new personal liberty laws were enacted in Vermont (1850), Connecticut (1854), Rhode Island (1854), Massachusetts (1855), Michigan (1855), Maine (1855 and 1857), Kansas (1858) and Wisconsin (1858). The personal liberty laws forbade justices and judges to take cognizance of claims, extended habeas corpus and the privilege of jury trial to fugitives, and punished false testimony severely. In 1854, the Supreme Court of Wisconsin went so far as to declare the Fugitive Slave Act unconstitutional.

These state laws were one of the grievances that South Carolina would later use to justify its secession from the Union. Attempts to carry into effect the law of 1850 aroused much bitterness. The arrests of Thomas Sims and of Shadrach Minkins in Boston in 1851; of Jerry M. Henry, in Syracuse, New York, in the same year; of Anthony Burns in 1854, in Boston; and of the Garner family in 1856, in Cincinnati, with other cases arising under the Fugitive Slave Law of 1850, probably had as much to do with bringing on the Civil War as did the controversy over slavery in the Territories.

== Civil War-era legal status of fugitive slaves ==
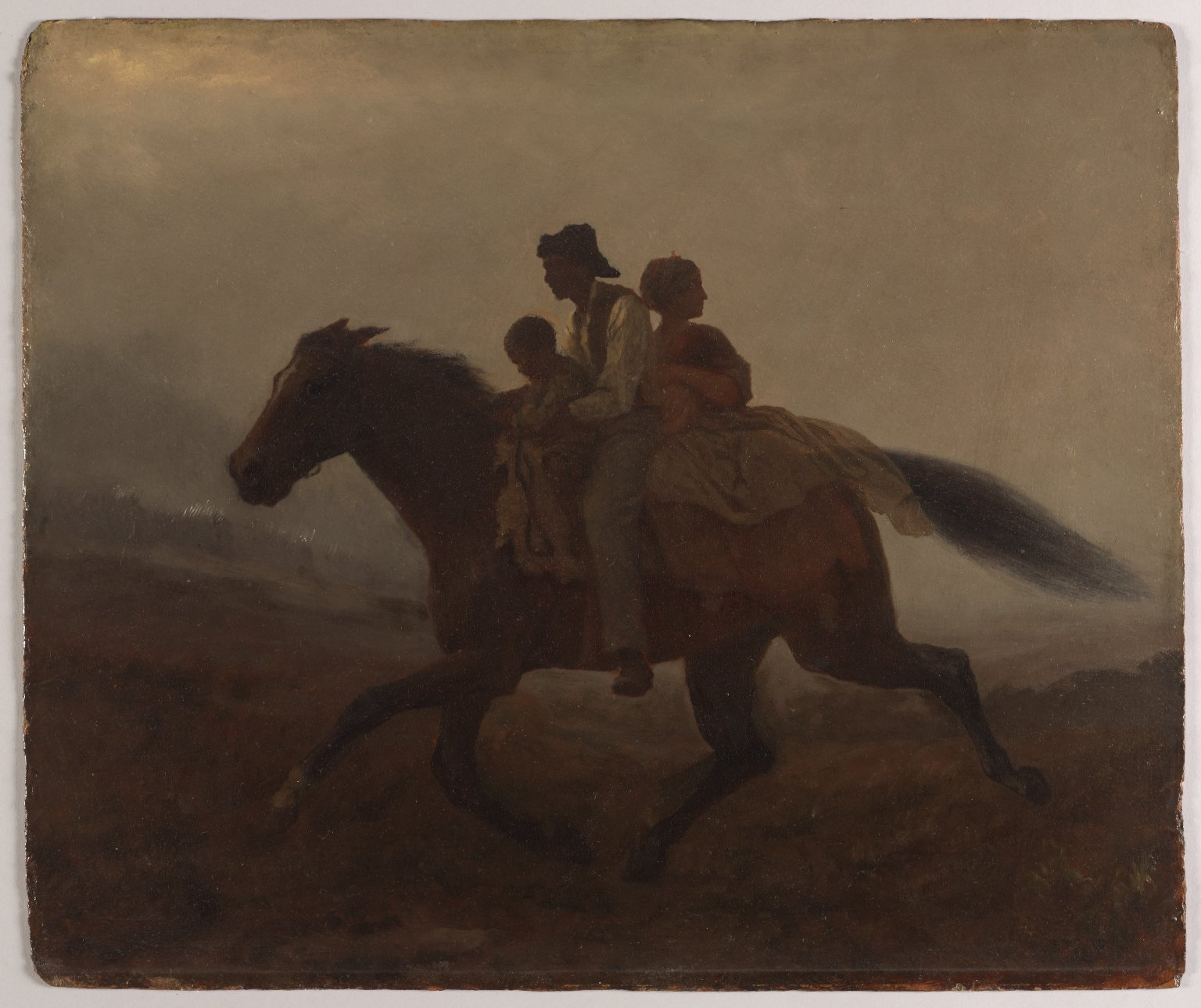
A Ride for Liberty—The Fugitive Slaves (c. 1862) by Eastman Johnson Brooklyn Museum

With the beginning of the Civil War, the legal status of many slaves was changed by their masters being in arms. Major General Benjamin Franklin Butler, in May 1861, declared that Confederate slaves used for military purposes such as building fortifications were contraband of war. The Confiscation Act of 1861 was passed in August 1861, and discharged from service or labor any slave employed in aiding or promoting any insurrection against the government of the United States.

By the congressional Act Prohibiting the Return of Slaves of March 13, 1862, any slave of a disloyal master who was in territory occupied by Northern troops was declared ipso facto free. But for some time the Fugitive Slave Law was considered still to hold in the case of fugitives from masters in the border states who were loyal to the Union government, and it was not until June 28, 1864, that the Act of 1850 was fully repealed.

== See also ==
- Slave Trade Acts
- Turner Chapel (Oakville)
- Fugitive slave advertisements in the United States
