= Isabella Jones and Ira Junius Johnson =

Canadian couple whose wedding was threatened by the Ku Klux Klan

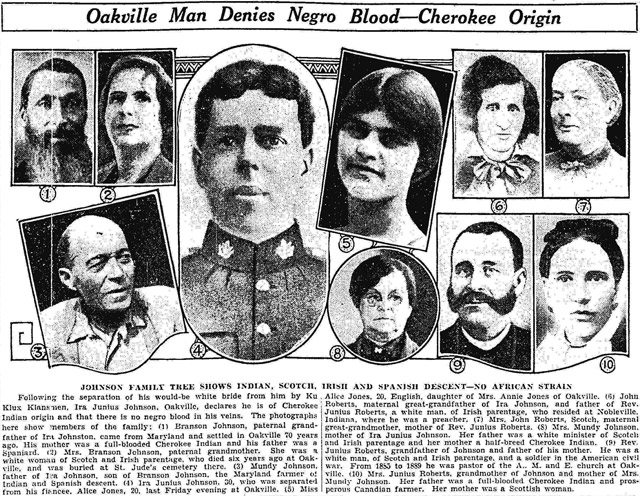
"Oakville Man Denies Negro Blood—Cherokee Origin", Toronto Star, 6 March 1930

In the Canadian town of Oakville, Ontario, on 28 February 1930, 75 members of the Ku Klux Klan attempted to prevent the marriage of a white woman, Isabella Jones, (Note: Some reports gave Jones's forename as "Alice".) to Ira Junius Johnson, a man presumed to be Black.

After burning a cross in the middle of a street in Oakville, the Klansmen searched for Johnson and Jones; they abducted Jones and threatened Johnson. Newspapers were sympathetic to the Klan at first, but the efforts of the Black community in Toronto turned public opinion against them; Johnson told the press that he was not Black, but of mixed white and Cherokee descent. Three Klansmen were brought to court. At first, only one was found guilty and fined $50; when he appealed, the court gave him a three-month sentence. Johnson and Jones married a month after the incident.

== Background ==
Ira Junius Johnson's paternal grandfather George Branson Johnson was a free Black man from Maryland who migrated with his family of eleven children (including Ira Junius's father) to the Province of Canada in the 1860s, where they settled in Oakville. They may have used the Underground Railroad to get there. Johnson's maternal grandfather Junius B. Roberts was from Indiana and served in the African-American 28th Indiana Infantry Regiment during the American Civil War. He later migrated to Canada and served as a minister in Guelph, Oakville, and Hamilton for the British Methodist Episcopal Church. His wife Francis had Johnson's mother Ida in 1870. The Johnsons were members of the Church Roberts served in Oakville. Ida and John wed on 27 September 1887; John worked as a weaver, and Ida as a midwife. They had three children, of whom the second, Ira Junius Johnson, was born 30 April 1893. After the death of Junius, Francis moved in with Ida and John.

Johnson grew up in Oakville, and the community accepted him as Black; he later asserted he was half white and half Cherokee. Despite a weak economy, he found work as a tanner at Oakville's largest factory. In 1916 he enlisted for service in the First World War. He was sent to the front in November as a member of the 9th Canadian Machine Gun Company during the Battle of Passchendaele. He was one of about 2000 Black Canadians who were accepted into non-segregated sections of the Canadian military—officers were free to turn them down, and most did. Johnson participated in the Hundred Days Offensive that closed the war in 1918, during which he suffered a shrapnel wound that permanently injured his leg. He returned to Canada in May 1919 and was discharged that July.

Johnson returned to Oakville to live with his parents. He trained and found work as a motor mechanic, but was laid off after five years. Thereafter he did casual work for building contractors. By 1930, Johnson was working as a labourer and was living with a white girl, Isabella Jones; They intended to marry on 2 March, but Jones's mother Annie objected to the interracial pairing.

Oakville lies on Lake Ontario between Toronto and Hamilton. It developed in the late 19th century as a resort town for affluent southwestern Ontarians. Oakville suffered unemployment after the Wall Street crash of 1929; in 1930 its population was about 4000, overwhelming of British Isles-descent. Census figures are not available for the Black population, though the mayor of Oakville J. B. Moat told the press at the time the "coloured" population had recently decreased, and stood at "not more than forty with women and children".

Unlike in the United States with its Jim Crow and Anti-miscegenation laws, Canadian law did not bar those of different ethnicities from socializing or marrying; social pressures nonetheless made inter-ethnic associations difficult. The Ku Klux Klan had established itself in Canada, but had far less widespread membership and influence than it had in the United States. There were no anti-discrimination or anti-hate speech laws in effect in Canada as of 1930.

== Incident ==
On the afternoon of 28 February 1930, Jones and Johnson went to New Toronto to get a marriage license. About 22:00 that evening 75 members of the Ku Klux Klan from Hamilton gathered in Oakville. They marched through the town at night, wakening hundreds of residents and were dressed in white gowns and hoods. They placed a cross in the middle of the road and set it on fire. When the cross had burned out, they sought the police chief, David Kerr, to communicate their intentions; as the hour was late, he was not at the police station. The Klansmen then looked for Jones and Johnson, and tracked them to the home of Johnson's aunt Viola Sault; the couple were playing cards with members of Johnson's family.

The Klansmen kidnapped Jones and took her at a Salvation Army location, where they watched over her from a car parked outside. Against his protests they placed Johnson in another car, surrounded by two guards, and burned a cross in front of the home. When the cross had finished burning, a representative of the Klan knocked on the door and informed Johnson's mother that if Johnson were "ever seen walking down the street with a white girl again the Klan would attend to him". They left Jones with Salvation Army Captain W. Broome and returned to Hamilton.

== Reactions ==
The press took a favourable view of the incident and the conduct of the Klansmen. Police Chief Kerr noted that, when they removed their hoods, he recognized many of them as prominent Hamiltonian businessmen. The press quoted the mayor of Oakville J. B. Moat as having stated:

There was a strong feeling against the marriage which the young girl and the negro had planned. Personally I think the Ku Klux Klan acted quite properly in the matter. It will be an object lesson.

Of the few newspapers that objected to the Klansmen's actions, The Globe stated that if they "believe ... their objectives are worthy ... they will stand for open discussion in daylight; they should not call for nocturnal visits and disguising costumes". Nevertheless, The Globe stated the Klan's goal "may be commendable in itself and prove a benefit", and criticized only the methods it used. The Klan sent letters rebuttal to the newspaper, defending its actions "on the ground of racial purity", and asserted they acted on the request of Jones's mother. They said she had appealed to the authorities, who denied her assistance as her daughter was over the age of majority. The "frantic" mother then resorted to calling the Klan and told them her daughter "was being detained by a negro". After detaining her, the Klan insisted she had changed her mind about the marriage and promised "never again [to] associate with a coloured man". The Klan took pains to disassociate itself from its counterpart in the United States by asserting its British character, and insisted it was not "opposed to the coloured people, provided they are true British subjects".

Members of Toronto's Black community moved to have the government deal with the Klan and its actions. Lawyers E. Lionel Cross and B. J. Spencer Pitt and Reverend H. Lawrence McNeil of the First Baptist Church of Toronto pressured Attorney General of Ontario William Herbert Price to launch a full investigation; Price had long had concerns over the Klan and had Kerr and Crown attorney William Inglis Dick to produce a full report. Toronto's Jewish community, Labour supporters, and the Women's International League for Peace and Freedom gave their support to the cause. Protesters gathered at the University Avenue First Baptist Church on 4 March.

Johnson invited reporters from the Toronto Star and told them he was not Black, but half white and half Cherokee. The newspaper printed his assertion on the front page of its 5 March edition under the title "Is of Indian Descent Ira Johnson Insists: Oakville man, Separated from His Sweetheart, Traces His Ancestry". The article opened:

Ira Junius Johnson, separated from his sweetheart, Alice Jones by Ku Klux Klansmen here last Friday, is of Indian descent and has not a drop of Negro blood in his veins, he told the Star yesterday at the home of his mother, who is a refined and intelligent woman.

Letters unfavourable to the Klan flooded into the newspapers; articles and editorials began to paint him in a favourable light and emphasized his war record. Moat retracted his comment and asserted he had been misquoted. Jones's mother insisted she did not oppose the marriage over Johnson's ethnicity, but because she thought he was too lazy to "get a job and make a man out of himself".

== Trials ==
Under pressure from Toronto's Black community, the police pursued a case against the Klansmen. On 7 March they tracked down several members via licence plates and the post-office box on a letter the Klan sent to The Globe. Dick issued summonses to four men: William A. Phillips, a chiropractor; Ernest Taylor, a police interpreter and minister at the Hamilton Presbyterian Church; Harold C. Orme, a chiropractic assistant; and a William Mahony. They were charged with being "disguised by night", a burglary-related charge that carried up to a five-year sentence. Cross objected to such a light charge, arguing they were liable for "charges of abduction, trespess, violence", and numerous other offenses.

At the trial, they pleaded "not guilty". The first witness, Police Chief Kerr, related that he had gone to investigate the cross-burning and shook hands with the defendants, who unmasked themselves and whom he said he knew "quite well"; he exhibited a white gown he had found at the site. He was questioned about Johnson's race and reputation and replied he was "coloured" and "unsavoury", though he had "never been in police court". Jones testified that she felt she had to get into the car with the men as "there were so many of them"; she could not recognize the accused as the men had been hooded. Phillips rejected the accusation that the Klan robes and hoods were a disguise and insisted they were "part of the traditional garb of the order" he belonged to.

The defence attorney painted the Klan as having acted for a noble cause where the law could not reach, and stressed the lack of violence. Wearing hoods, he asserted, was "no more wrong than ... than it is for other lodgemen to wear regalia". Dick countered, "They were hooded for the purpose of taking that girl from this home, and not for lodge-room work." The court found Taylor and Orme not guilty, but Magistrate W. E. McIlveen decided on Phillips's guilt, saying he "fail[ed] to see that there was any lawful excuse" for the Klan to have gone there hooded. The prosecution sought no term of imprisonment, but only a fine, saying "the penalty is immaterial. All that the Crown wants to show is that there is a machinery of Justice in Canada." Phillips was fined $50, and the defence appealed.

Phillips threatened Jones outside the courthouse to return to her mother, and told her mother to call him again if she did not heed his warning. Thousands of members of the Klan protested the decision and threatened Black activists. Klan recruitment activity increased and Johnson's house burned down, over which Chief Kerr took no action.

Five white judges of the Ontario Court of Appeal heard Phillips's appeal and Attorney General Price's counter-appeal on 16 April. The court did not look favourably upon the appeal and declared they would "not tolerate any group of men attempting to administer a self-made law". The court characterized the Klan's actions as "mob law" and found Phillips guilty; he served three months in prison.

== Aftermath ==
After Phillips's release, the Klan filed a request to hold a parade; the Oakville city council rejected it. Though the Klan never disappeared, its power weakened throughout the rest of the 1930s in the face of the government's unwillingness to tolerate its actions. Laws dealing with hate crimes were passed gradually over the following decades throughout Canada.

Johnson and Jones married on 24 March 1930. The white pastor who conducted the wedding responded to concerns about Klan interference by saying, "I was here before the Klan." They had two children, and Johnson took work as a gardener. He died in 1966.

Generations later, writer Lawrence Hill found that those in Johnson's community had always considered Johnson Black. He speculated that, while Johnson having aboriginal ancestry could not be ruled out, no evidence for it existed. Johnson may have hidden his Black ancestry due to the Klan's reputation for lynching Blacks in the US. For successfully turning citizens' feelings towards him by denying his Black heritage, Hill called him "Canada's first spin doctor".
