= Little Mosque on the Prairie =

Canadian television sitcom

- Logo for Little Mosque on the Prairie in early seasons.
- Created by: Zarqa Nawaz
- Starring: Zaib Shaikh; Carlo Rota; Sheila McCarthy; Sitara Hewitt; Manoj Sood; Arlene Duncan; Debra McGrath; Derek McGrath; Brandon Firla; Neil Crone; Aliza Vellani
- Ending theme: Music and singing by Maryem Tollar
- Country of origin: Canada
- Original language: English
- No. of seasons: 6
- No. of episodes: 90 + 1 special (list of episodes)

Production
- Executive producers: Mary Darling; Clark Donnelly
- Production locations: Toronto, Ontario and Indian Head, Saskatchewan, Canada
- Running time: 22 mins. (approx)
- Production company: WestWind Pictures

Original release
- Network: CBC Television
- Release: January 9, 2007 – April 2, 2012

Little Mosque on the Prairie is a Canadian television sitcom created by Zarqa Nawaz and the second Canadian TV series to take place in small fictional town Saskatchewan alongside Corner Gas, the show was produced by WestWind Pictures, originally broadcast from 2007 to 2012 on CBC. Filmed in Toronto, Ontario, and Indian Head, Saskatchewan, the series was showcased at the Dawn Breakers International Film Festival. After the series finale aired in April 2012, Hulu announced it would begin offering the series under the name Little Mosque that summer. The series made its American premiere on Pivot in August 2013.

== Plot ==
The series focuses on the Muslim community in the fictional prairie town of Mercy, Saskatchewan (population 14,000). The primary institutions of the community are the local mosque, presided over by imam Amaar Rashid and located in the rented parish hall of the town's Anglican church, and Fatima's Café, a downtown diner run by Fatima Dinssa. The community patriarchs are Yasir Hamoudi, a construction contractor who initially fronted the money to establish the mosque under the pretense that he was renting office space for his business, and Baber Siddiqui, a college economics professor who served as the mosque's temporary imam until Amaar was hired.

The town of Mercy is governed by Mayor Ann Popowicz. Sarah Hamoudi, Yasir's wife, who is white, works as a public relations officer in Popowicz's office. However, after Yasir had to leave Mercy and go to Lebanon in season 4 (episode 10), Sarah managed his contracting company. Sarah converted to Islam, but was originally a member of the same Anglican Church whose parish hall the mosque is run from.

The title is a play on the name of the classic traditional book and television drama series, Little House on the Prairie. The two series are unrelated aside from the modified version of the title logo, which was used for early seasons.

== Characters ==
- Amaar Rashid (Zaib Shaikh) – Formerly a big shot lawyer from Toronto, he finds his true calling as a cleric and answers an ad to become an imam at Mercy's mosque. He does this despite the dismay of his family. He tends to support liberal movements within Islam, sometimes putting him in conflict with the more conservative Muslims in the community. Amaar tends to be sarcastic, which he blames on his work as a lawyer. His wealthy parents (Hrant Alianak and Veena Sood) are not religious at all and continue to pressure Amaar to return to his much more lucrative law career. He tends to say, "I am the imam!" to prove his point or to show that despite his age, he has authority. He normally uses this when other characters (particularly Rayyan and Baber) are fighting and will not listen to reason. Amaar has also been known to be petty and hold a grudge but is generally a good man of faith. Amaar married Rayyan at the end of season 5. They have returned from their honeymoon to Mercy after Sarah and Yasir divorced. In season six, Amaar does not start out as the imam despite pressure from some congregation members to do so.
- Yasir Hamoudi (Carlo Rota) – A contractor who runs his business out of an office at the mosque, he is a practical man who seeks compromise. He is committed to Islam, but is also an opportunist and not, as his daughter might put it, "a good Muslim." For instance, one of the main reasons he helps out with the mosque is because he does not want to lose his free office space, but he lost that privilege when the church's bishop learned of the arrangement and ordered Rev. Magee to pay appropriate rent to the church organization for it which was passed on to Yasir. Yasir is a card-carrying member of the Conservative Party of Canada, although more for the networking opportunities than out of any particular interest in being politically active. His role was reduced in seasons 4–5, due to Rota's other acting commitments; within the show, his absence was explained as a temporary return to Lebanon to care for his ailing mother. Yasir is said to have left to stay in Lebanon, in the process separating from his wife, Sarah, after a 31-year-long marriage.
- Sarah Hamoudi (Sheila McCarthy) – A former Anglican, Sarah converted to Islam when she married Yasir. Like her husband, she struggles with Muslim customs and regulations and is often shown up by their more pious daughter, Rayyan. She wears the hijab when attending services at the mosque, but not day-to-day. After her divorce from Yasir, she returned to her original name as "Sarah Cunningham" at the insistence of Ann Popowicz. Ann wanted Sarah to have "Danger" as her new middle name, but it ended up being Dangler. After Sarah's divorce, Baber and Rev. Thorne begin competing for her soul or which religion she may become part of. Sarah was revealed to also lack a wild side, and her memories of a wild past were actually her living through her friend Ann Popowicz. Sarah does try to let herself go wild when she kisses a stranger named Lou and gets into a bar fight with his girlfriend Svetlana. She later goes through a spiritual crisis, leaving Islam to return to the Anglican church but eventually finds she does indeed want to be Muslim and so renews her shahadah.
- Rayyan Hamoudi (Sitara Hewitt) – Yasir and Sarah's daughter, a doctor, she follows Islamic feminism, keeps the sartorial hijab, and takes her religion very seriously. Her Western medical treatments are met with disapproval by Fatima, who uses traditional Nigerian remedies. She is occasionally foiled by her own ambition; in one episode, she insists on being named as the mosque's representative to the local Interfaith Council as her price for letting go of an argument with Amaar, only to discover at her first meeting that the council is really little more than an interfaith bake-sale committee. Rayyan has long had feelings for Amaar, and they are currently married. Rayyan pushed her mother to join a divorce group but later on has discovered her own insecurities regarding her marriage. Her fear is that her parents' divorce may lead to problems between her and Amaar. In this fear, she gives up her habits of drinking milk out of the carton and forcing Amaar to place the dishes a certain way in the dishwasher.
- Baber Siddiqui (Manoj Sood) – A divorced college economics professor and the most conservative member of the Muslim community in Mercy, he acted as the imam prior to Amaar's arrival in the pilot episode; when Amaar briefly quits his job in Season 3, Baber again takes over as imam, and proves to be one of the reasons the community is so determined to get Amaar back. His conservatism often conflicts with the wishes of his teenage daughter Layla, although he loves her dearly (in fact the main reason he has custody of her is that when his ex-wife came to visit him after he moved to Mercy, she saw that the only thing he had bothered to unpack was his daughter's picture on the wall). He wears a taqiyah and a shalwar kameez and constantly rants and raves and complains about everything, to the point that most of his acquaintances consider him obnoxious. He once falsely claimed that he was on the American no-fly list to cover up his own fear of flying, resulting in Rayyan and Amaar taking him to the U.S. consulate in Regina three separate times to help him clear his name. He calls most non-Muslims "imbeciles" and "infidels", although it is rather obvious that he is not any sort of dangerous fanatic but just a harmless crank. In the episode "The Letter", Baber takes an interest in a female motivational speaker (played by Andrea Martin) who is stranded in Mercy, who in turn becomes interested in him. Everything goes well until Baber utters some anti-Semitic remarks. The motivational speaker takes offense and reveals to Baber that she is Jewish. Baber comes to Amaar for guidance. Amaar reminds him that anti-Semitism is not tolerated in the Muslim faith. Baber also falls for Thorne's ploy of taking over as Imam which led to Amaar being removed as Imam. His bringing in the overzealous Rahaloon resulted in the mosque being removed from the church. Later Amaar made amends with Baber when he was reinstated as Imam. Baber performed Amaar and Rayyan's wedding and they left for their honeymoon. Upon their return it is revealed that Baber is the current Imam and is good friends with Reverend Thorne.
- Fatima Dinssa (Arlene Duncan) – A conservative Nigerian immigrant and the widowed owner of a cafe/diner. She is spirited and enjoys engaging in verbal sparring matches, frequently with Fred Tupper, the local bigot and radio "shock jock" who has a crush on her. She hates the Mercy Diner, her competition. She has a son, Jamal (Demetrius Joyette), who hates being forced to play ayo by his mother. She officially becomes a Canadian citizen during the show's run. Her culinary expertise is recognized by all the residents of Mercy, Muslim and non-Muslim alike. More often than not, this is used to underline just how much good food can create a bridge over cultural barriers.
- Rev. Duncan Magee (Derek McGrath) – The priest of the Anglican Church which also houses the mosque, he is a good friend to Amaar and the two clerics often turn to each other for advice. He is liberal, once offering to perform a gay marriage at the church and is willing to stand up to the church hierarchy when he believes that it is acting inconsistently with the true message of Christianity. He often laments the sad state of his own church and congregation. His character departs the show after season 3, to be replaced by the ambitious, younger and distinctly less accommodating Rev. William Thorne, though Rev. Magee does return for a few episodes in season 5. In seasons 1–3, it is gradually revealed that he has a number of hobbies (including curling, running and painting), all taken very seriously. His presence on the show illustrates the commonalities between Islamic and Anglican faiths and the similar problems the priests of each faith must face.
- Mayor Ann Popowicz (Debra McGrath) – Mayor of Mercy, she supports the Muslim community in return for their votes. She is primarily concerned with maximizing the perks of her office and minimizing the amount of work that she actually has to do. She has a bit of a wild streak, having been known to date members of the Hells Angels and has more skeletons in her closet than the local cemetery. She is witty, blunt and a bit of a lush, but leans greatly upon Sarah, her PR person, when she missteps.
- Fred Tupper (Neil Crone) – The local loudmouth and the host of a talk show on the local radio station, he often equates Muslims to terrorists who want to take over the country. However, at times he finds himself in the awkward position of siding with the Muslim community, as evidenced in the first season. A flashback episode revealed that his distrust of Muslims stems more from an unpleasant encounter with Baber than from any deeply held prejudices. His radio rants are primarily a ratings-grabbing persona; while he can be a blowhard jerk on and off the air, he treats pretty much everyone with equal condescension (not just Muslims). By season 3, it is revealed that his objectionable comments have more to do with habit and keeping ratings up, than any active dislike of Muslims. In fact, when he believes he is dying, he is downright friendly to everyone (including Muslims) and almost declares his love to Fatima. She graciously allows him his dignity when he claims it is in fact her hummus that he loves. Fred Tupper is also a divorcee.
- Layla Siddiqui (Aliza Vellani) – Baber's daughter and a portrait of an average teenage Muslim girl struggling to find the right balance between her desire to be a good Muslim and her desire for the lifestyle of a regular Canadian teenager who's into music, clothes and boys. She can be rebellious and sarcastic, especially at her father's foibles (she refers to their home as "Baberistan"), but is also very perceptive and insightful.
- Junaid Jaffer, also known as J.J. (Stephen Lobo) – Son of Yasir's friend Karim and fiancé of Rayyan through seasons 2–3. Former geeky childhood playmate turned urbane, handsome and wealthy engineer he can be indecisive and eventually jilts Rayyan at the altar.
- Joe Peterson (Boyd Banks) – A local farmer and a perpetually trouble-making sidekick of Fred Tupper. Basically, a stereotypical hoser, he mostly trades cheap insults with Fred and occasionally causes mayhem by going for a joyride on his tractor. He is mainly a comic relief character, appearing in almost every episode, without a driving role in the plot. Despite this, he is used challenge the viewers' assumptions since he is revealed to be surprisingly well read. In fact, to their mutual surprise, he and Baber have found themselves agreeing on things more often than they expect, developing a friendship only occasionally hampered by cultural differences. He even finds common ground with Sarah, having read and loved the novel she chose for book club.
- Nate Shore (Jeff White) – Editor and reporter for the local newspaper. He has a very Zen attitude to his job as the main news source of a tiny, tiny town. He is a good friend of Amaar, despite Amaar's occasional exasperation at his freewheeling personality.
- Reverend William Thorne (Brandon Firla) — Rev. Magee's replacement, feels it is his religious duty to compete with Amaar for the souls of the residents of Mercy. At first, he uses Amaar's forgiving nature to build his congregation and eventually kicks the mosque out but brings them back because the Archdeacon likes having a mosque in the church to show cultural diversity. It is revealed he feels a great shame over being adopted and dislikes his older brother. Thorne eventually takes Amaar's help in becoming a better person and begins trying to convince Amaar to be his friend. He is jealous of Rev. Magee when he returns to be Amaar's best man because Amaar clearly prefers the old reverend. Thorne shows some weakness when it is revealed that he has a crush on Rose, the town librarian, but is too shy to ask her out. With the help of Rayyan and Amaar, the two begin dating.

== Production ==
Although the show is set in Saskatchewan, the actual production is split between Saskatchewan and Ontario. Episodes 1-2 were filmed in Regina, but the rest of season 1 was filmed in the Toronto area. Indian Head, where a set has been built for the exterior of the mosque, doubles for the show's exteriors. Film Rescue International's building exterior stands in for the town hall and Certified Plumbing and Heating as the local used car dealership. The Novia Cafe, the front of which is used in the show as a stand-in for Fatima's, was located in Regina. It closed in the early Summer 2011.

Actors Zaib Shaikh and Aliza Vellani are Muslims. Sitara Hewitt (Rayyan) is also of partial Pakistani Muslim descent, but was raised Christian as both of her parents are Anglican Christians. Manoj Sood (Baber) is a Hindu Punjabi.

Zarqa Nawaz based much of the show on her personal experiences. Many of the characters are partially inspired by her family and friends. The episode "The Barrier" is based on a true happening at Nawaz's mosque when incoming conservative Muslims pressured the imam to put up a barrier separating men and women. The pilot episode also contained a satire of Maher Arar's 2002 detainment.

In the episode "The Archdeacon Cometh", the archdeacon mentions having to "shut down a church in Dog River", referencing another Canadian sitcom Corner Gas on rival network CTV. Carlo Rota and Sheila McCarthy, in character as Yasir and Sarah, also later appeared in a crossover with Brent (Brent Butt) and Hank (Fred Ewanuick) from Corner Gas on the sketch comedy series Royal Canadian Air Farce, debating the location of Mercy and Dog River (both fictional towns) in relation to each other after Yasir and Sarah bought the gas station and fired Brent.

Guest actors who have appeared on the show include Colin Mochrie, Dan Redican, Samantha Bee, Dave Foley, Maria Vacratsis, Sam Kalilieh, Peter Wildman, Sugith Varughese, Hrant Alianak, Jennifer Robertson, Kathryn Winslow, Jayne Eastwood, Patrick McKenna and Tom Jackson, as well as hockey player Darcy Tucker, curler Glenn Howard, and sportscaster Ron MacLean.

=== Production staff ===
The show's executive producers are Mary Darling and Clark Donnelly, owners of WestWind Pictures, and Allan Magee. Producers are Colin Brunton and Michael Snook while the show's associate producer is Shane Corkery, along with Jason Belleville, Dan Redican and Zarqa Nawaz as consulting producers.

The writing staff includes or has included Susan Alexander, Cole Bastedo, Jason Belleville, Andrew Carr, Andrew De Angelis, Claire Ross Dunn, Sadiya Durrani, Greg Eckler, Anthony Q. Farrell, Josh Gal, Sarah Glinski, Barbara Haynes, Karen Hill, Paul Mather, Jackie May, Zarqa Nawaz, Paul Pogue, Al Rae, Dan Redican, Sam Ruano, Vera Santamaria, Rebecca Schechter, Rob Sheridan, Miles G. Smith and Ron Sparks. Carr, Mather, and Sheridan were previously writers for Corner Gas.

The directors for the first four seasons include Michael Kennedy (33 episodes including the pilot and entire first season), Brian Roberts (14), James Allodi (6), Steve Wright (4), Jeff Beesley (4), Paul Fox (4), and Zarqa Nawaz (1).

Faisal Kutty, a Toronto-based lawyer, academic and writer served as the first Islamic culture and practice content consultant for the show. He was responsible to provide advice and feedback on accuracy in terms of the portrayal of Islamic norms and practices. He also provided input to producers and writers.

== Themes ==
The show derives some of its humour from exploring the interactions of the Muslims with the non-Muslim townspeople of Mercy, and the contrast of conservative Islamic views (held primarily by the characters of Baber and Fatima) with more liberal interpretations of Islam (as represented by Amaar and Rayyan.) The show is essentially a traditional sitcom whose most unusual trait is being set among a Muslim community in small town Canada. Nawaz herself has stated that the show's primary agenda is to be funny, not to be a political platform. She has also stated that she views comedy as one of the most valuable and powerful ways to break down barriers and to encourage dialogue and understanding between cultures.

This is represented by the show's promotional tagline, "Small town Canada with a little Muslim twist": the religious angle, while always present, is largely tied to and sometimes even secondary to standard and universal sitcom themes such as family, friends and the humour in everyday life. For example, while the show sometimes tackles storylines with a political edge, such as a character claiming to be unable to attend a conference in the United States because he says he was wrongly placed on a no-fly list (when in fact he is simply afraid of flying) or the mosque being raided by the Canadian Security Intelligence Service, even these situations are explored as much for their humour as their politics. The show much more commonly explores purely comedic issues such as whether a Muslim woman still has to cover her hair if the only man who can see her is gay, whether Muslims can curl, whether to haggle with the carpet salesman when buying a prayer rug, or whether a Muslim woman's head scarf is enough to mitigate a bad hair day. Television critics have also credited this very combination of an attention-grabbing premise with conventional and familiar sitcom themes as one of the primary reasons that the show successfully retained an audience after its debut.

The series also sidesteps issues of stereotyping by having characters in both the Muslim and non-Muslim communities who cross the entire spectrum of political opinion. Baber and Fatima, who represent conservative views within Islam, are balanced by conservative radio host Fred Tupper among the non-Muslims, while Amaar and Rayyan, who represent Islamic liberalism, are balanced by the liberal Anglican Rev. Magee. The more moderate Yasir and Sarah, who try to be good Muslims but aren't particularly strongly defined by their faith, are balanced among the non-Muslims by Mayor Popowicz, who doesn't care what anybody's religious beliefs are as long as they vote for her on election day.

Hewitt's character of Rayyan Hamoudi, in particular, has been singled out in the media as a strong and unique role model for young Muslim women—both for her ability to reconcile a commitment to her Muslim faith with a modern, feminist-inspired Western lifestyle and career, and as a fashion icon who dresses in clothes that are religiously appropriate yet stylish, professional and contemporary.

== Episodes ==
Season	Episodes	Originally released	
Season	Episodes	First released	Last released
1	8	January 9, 2007	March 7, 2007
2	20	October 3, 2007	March 5, 2008
3	20	October 1, 2008	March 23, 2009
4	18	September 28, 2009	March 15, 2010
Special		December 6, 2010	
5	13	January 3, 2011	March 28, 2011
6	11	January 9, 2012	April 2, 2012

== International telecast and home media releases ==
On May 8, 2007, WestWind Pictures announced that the show would be airing in France, Switzerland, and Francophone Africa beginning in July on French subscription channel Canal+.

On September 26, 2007, WestWind Pictures announced that the show would soon air in Israel, United Arab Emirates, Turkey (Middle East) and Finland . On October 2, 2007, Al Jazeera English confirmed that the United Arab Emirates and Finland had signed deals to begin airing the series in 2008.

From June 12, 2008, Télévision de Radio-Canada, CBC Television's French-language counterpart, aired a French-language dub of the series titled La Petite Mosquée dans la Prairie.

The series began airing under the name Little Mosque on Hulu in June 2012.

The series made its American television debut on Pivot in August 2013 under the name Little Mosque.

Entertainment One has released all six seasons of Little Mosque on the Prairie on DVD in Region 1 (Canada only). Season 6 was released on 23 October 2012.

The cover art for the first season DVD.

The series' logo used for the cover art of the DVD releases does not use the mosque imagery of the televised version, thus rendering it similar to that used by Little House on the Prairie except for the use of the word "Mosque" instead of "House".

As of 2023, the series is streaming on both services: The Roku Channel and Tubi.

== Reception ==
Unusual for a Canadian television series, Little Mosque received extensive advance publicity in international media, with stories appearing in The New York Times, the Washington Times and the Texan Houston Chronicle, as well as on CNN, NPR and the BBC.

The show premiered on January 9, 2007, at 8:30 p.m. The pilot then re-aired on January 15 in the show's regular timeslot, and the series subsequently aired Mondays at 8:00 p.m. (all times half an hour later in Newfoundland).

The series premiere drew an audience of 2.1 million, an exceptionally strong rating for domestic programming in the Canadian television market, and on par with Canadian ratings for popular American series. It was, in fact, the largest audience the CBC had achieved in a decade for an entertainment program. By comparison, Corner Gas, one of the highest-rated Canadian TV shows, attracts just under one and a half million viewers for a typical episode. The second episode, airing against the second night of the much-anticipated season premiere of American Idol in most markets, had 1.2 million viewers, a sharp drop but still a high rating for a Canadian sitcom, and very high for CBC Television, which has had trouble garnering large audiences for its scripted programming in recent years.

At the end of the show's season on March 7, 2007, the show attracted 1.1 million viewers, or an average of 1.2 million for the season. CBC Television renewed the show for a second season consisting of 20 episodes, which started airing on October 3, 2007, and continued to attract an average of one million viewers per episode.

CBC renewed the show for a third season on March 7, 2008. The third season premiered on CBC Television on October 1, 2008. In its third season ratings declined and as of December 2008 it was attracting a quarter of its initial audience. In its fourth season ratings declined further and as of December 2009 it was drawing 420,000 viewers a week, or twenty percent of its original audience.

On February 11, 2011, it was announced that CBC had renewed the series for a sixth and final season. This season began airing on CBC on January 9, 2012 and concluded on April 2, 2012.

=== Critical reception ===
Canadian writer and producer Ken Finkleman, who is best known for his CBC series The Newsroom, criticized the show's sunny outlook. "There’s deep confusion and racism about the place of Islam in the Western world and it’s the thing that’s broiling up under everything in the world, and the show presents this world where everything is happy."

The Los Angeles Times wrote: "'Mosque' was conceived in the wake of the 2005 Danish Muhammad cartoon crisis by producer Mary Darling, her husband, Clark Donnelly, and writer Zarqa Nawaz when they met at the Banff Television Festival. The basic premise was: What would it look like if a Muslim born and raised in Canada became an imam?"

In regard to the program's initially never been shown in the U.S., the Los Angeles Times stated: "The genius of 'Mosque' is that the characters resonate with viewers all over the world. The show is broadcast in 83 countries, including the United Arab Emirates and Turkey; the format was sold to 20th Century Fox in 2008 for an American remake but nothing came of it. Nawaz's explanation: 'We didn't have 9/11, and we have a public broadcaster. 9/11 affected the American psyche in a major way, and you have to be sensitive to that.'"

=== Weekly ratings ===
#	Episode	Air Date	Viewers (m)
1	"Little Mosque"	January 9, 2007	2.178
2	"The Barrier"	January 17, 2007	1.232
3	"The Open House"	January 31, 2007	1.311
4	"Swimming Upstream"	February 6, 2007	1.085
5	"The Convert"	February 14, 2007	1.112
6	"The Archdeacon Cometh"	February 21, 2007	0.906
7	"Mother-in-Law"	February 28, 2007	1.001
8	"Playing with Fire"	March 7, 2007	1.128

=== Awards ===
The show was nominated for Best Writing at the 2007 Canadian Comedy Awards. The episode "The Convert" was nominated for Best Writing in a Comedy or Variety Program or Series and Best Direction in a Comedy Program or Series at the 2007 Gemini Awards. The show was also nominated for Best Television Series – Comedy at the 2007 Directors Guild of Canada Awards.

Internationally, Little Mosque won awards for Best International Television Series and Best Screenplay at the 2007 RomaFictionFest. Former Canadian federal Member of Parliament Rahim Jaffer, who is Muslim, and director Michael Kennedy introduced the program screening.

The show won the Canada Award for media representation of multiculturalism at the 2007 Gemini Awards, and the 2007 Search for Common Ground Award, an international humanitarian award whose past recipients have included Muhammad Ali, Desmond Tutu and Jimmy Carter.

Since the producers of the show are followers of the Baháʼí Faith, it was selected and showcased in the Dawn Breakers International Film Festival in both years (2008 and 2009) of festivals making its first international film festival premieres in the U.S. and every country of Europe.

=== Planned version set in United States ===
In June 2008, Fox announced plans to adapt Little Mosque on the Prairie into an American setting, in partnership with the show's production company, WestWind Pictures. The planned deal would not affect the Canadian version if it were to be picked up in the United States by another distributor nor network. The American version of the show has never been produced since the acquisition.
