= Mary Darling (television producer) =

Canadian television producer

- Born: Canada
- Occupations: Businessperson, television producer
- Spouse: Clark Donnelly

Mary Darling is a producer, film director and co-owner of WestWind Pictures. Mary was instrumental in helping WestWind evolve from a minor to a major player in Canada's film and television industry. She has created, produced, and directed multiple series, and her latest accomplishment is serving as director on the feature film Cast Aside the Clouds.

In addition to providing WestWind Pictures' overall management, creative, and executive-producer services for all of its series, Darling heads WestWind Releasing, which develops and distributes most of WestWind's diverse properties. In particular, she was the executive producer for the Canadian television comedy Little Mosque on the Prairie, which she later shopped to American broadcasters.

Darling was the recipient of the 2007 Women in Film and Television International award for International Achievement - Excellence in Innovation (Television) an award she claims to share with her husband, Clark Donnelly, even though it sits on her desk.

Darling is a practicing Baha'i.
