= Turner Chapel (Oakville, Ontario) =

Church building in Oakville, Canada

Coordinates: 43°26′29″N 79°40′24″W

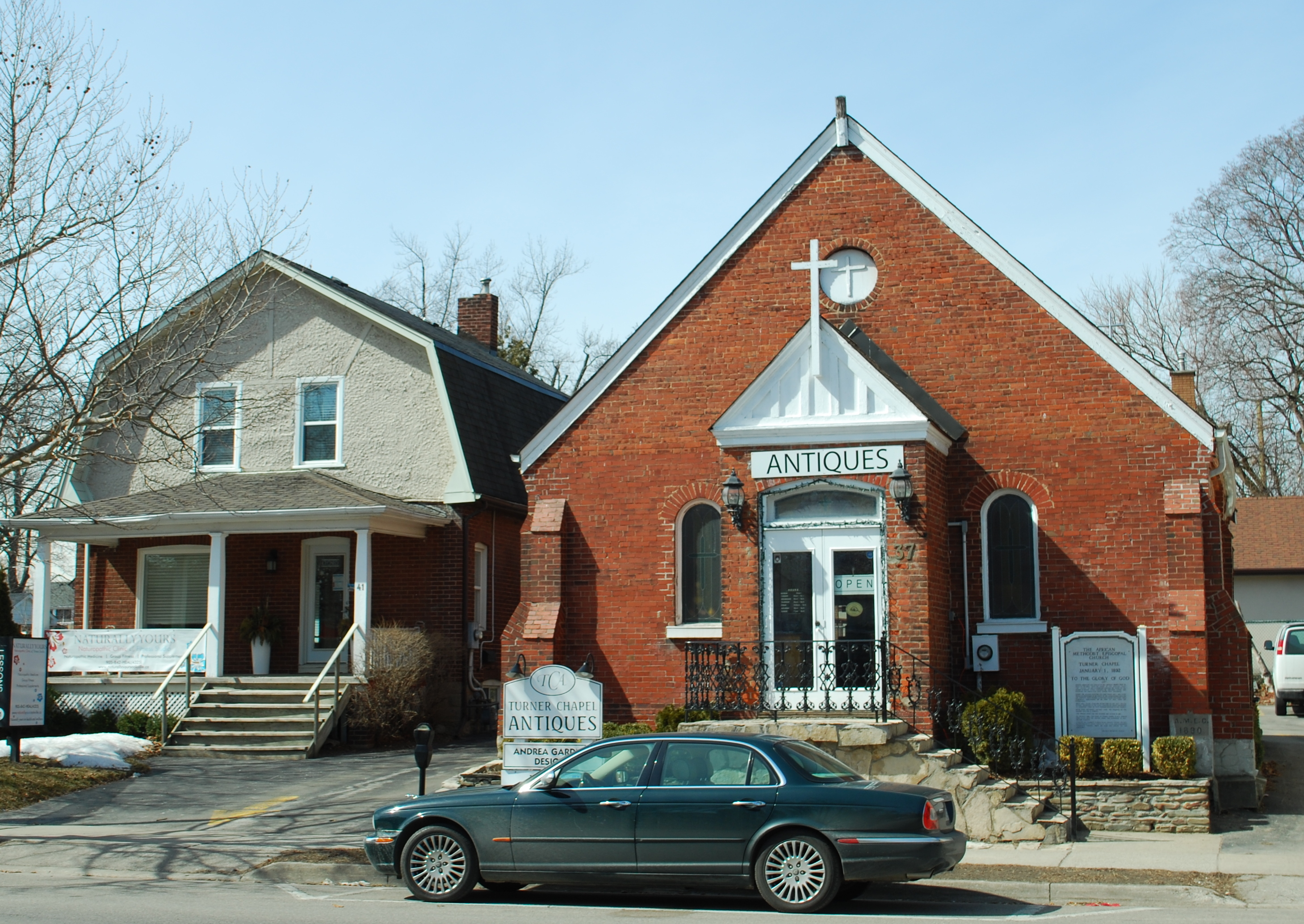
- Turner Chapel and its associated manse

Religion
- Province: Ontario

Location
- Municipality: Oakville
- Country: Canada
- Interactive map of Turner Chapel

Turner Chapel was an African Methodist Episcopal Church located at 37 Lakeshore Road West in Oakville, Ontario, Canada. It was established in 1891 by Samuel Adams and his brother-in-law Reverend William Butler. An earlier structure, built on the east side of Sixteen Mile Creek, had burned down. The west side of the river, where artisans lived, was a more welcoming environment for Oakville's "Black Church". The church was named after Bishop Henry McNeal Turner, an advocate of the back-to-Africa movement, and the first black chaplain, appointed by Abraham Lincoln, during the American Civil War.

The escaped slaves were seeking to escape the penalties of the fugitive slave laws which were passed in the United States in the early nineteenth century. Many of the escapees were skilled tradesmen and one of their number developed the technology that made "stoneboating" possible. Stoneboating was a system where ships could grapple for slabs of sedimentary rock which could then be cut and prepared for building materials. The stratification of the rock, a natural process over eons of time, made for regularly shaped "brick-like" material which had the virtue of being easy to form and consistent in shape. In fact, it was an ideal supply for local stonemasons.

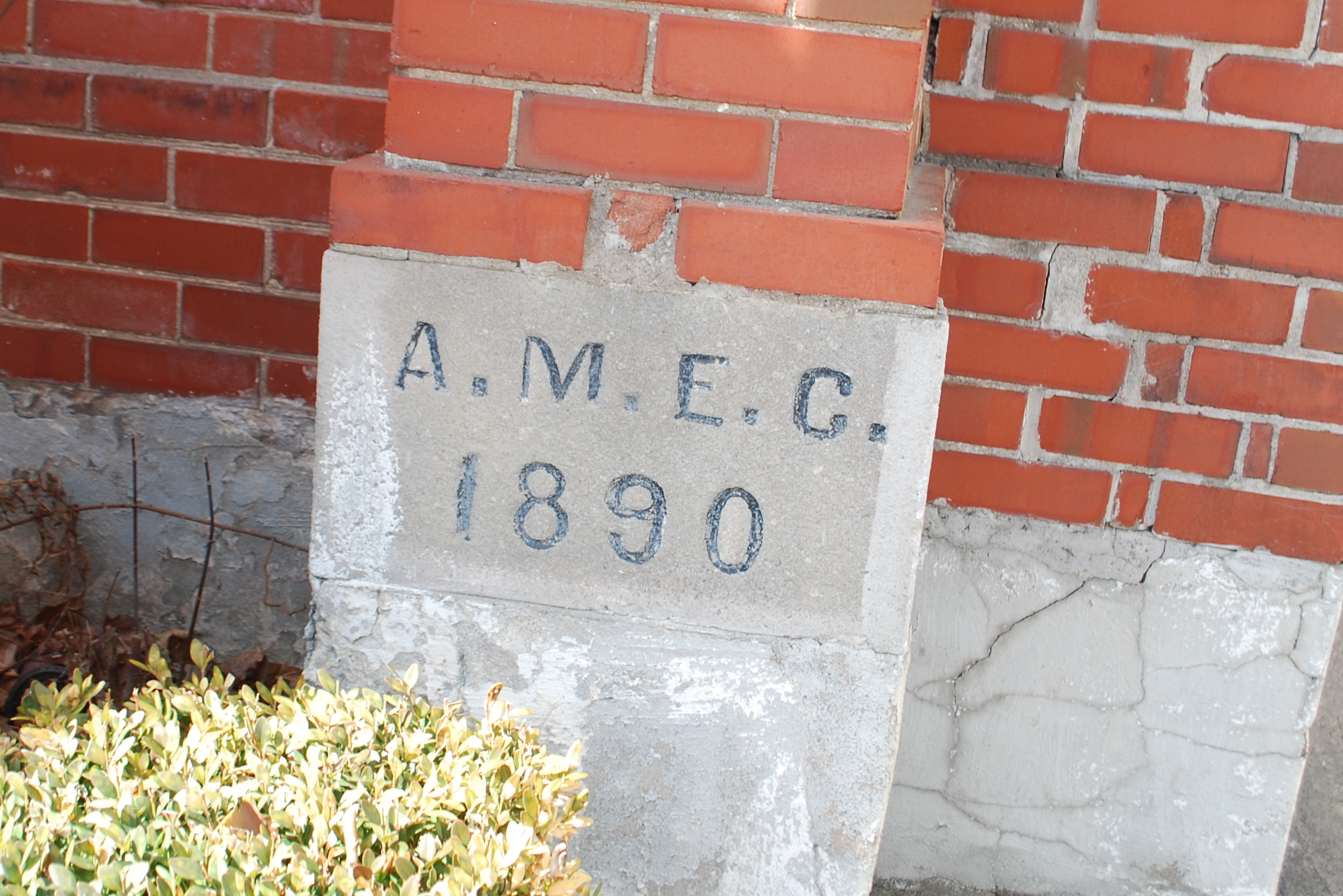
The Original Corner Stone.

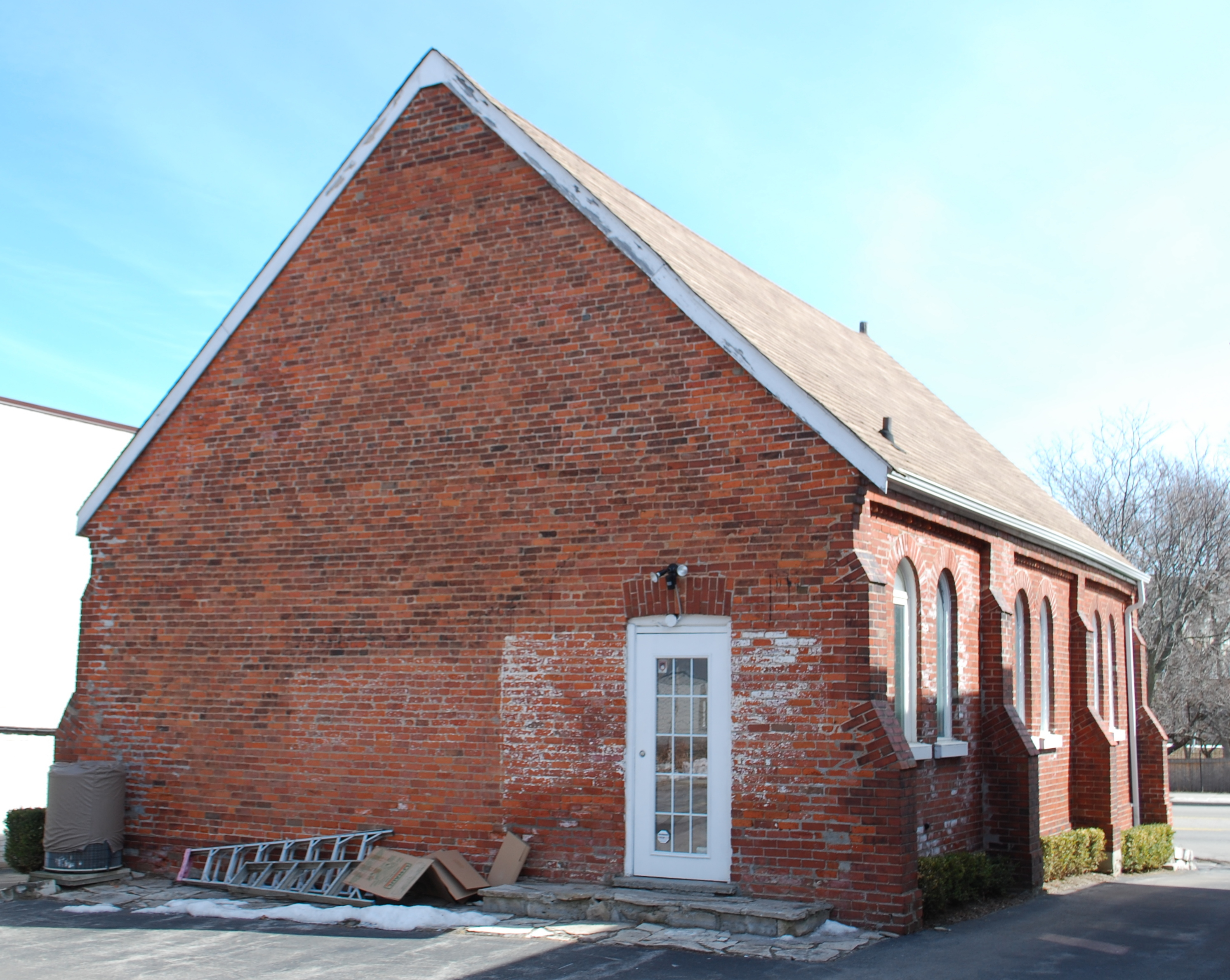
The Brick face of the church to the near of the property.

It would be an error to think of the newcomers as indigent. Through their intelligence and their craftsmanship they began to have sufficient capital to invest in homes, farms, and a place of worship that was distinctly their own. Rather than copy the places of worship they had known in the southern states they were impressed by the churches of east Oakville. That's likely why they chose red brick for the structure complete with "flying buttresses" which, in essence, are strictly ornamental rather than functional. The floor area of the church is little over 1000 square feet and it was built on sand. This method of building had the virtue of providing complete drainage and keeping the structure free of moisture and the possibility of mold.

== Oakville Heritage Society plaque ==
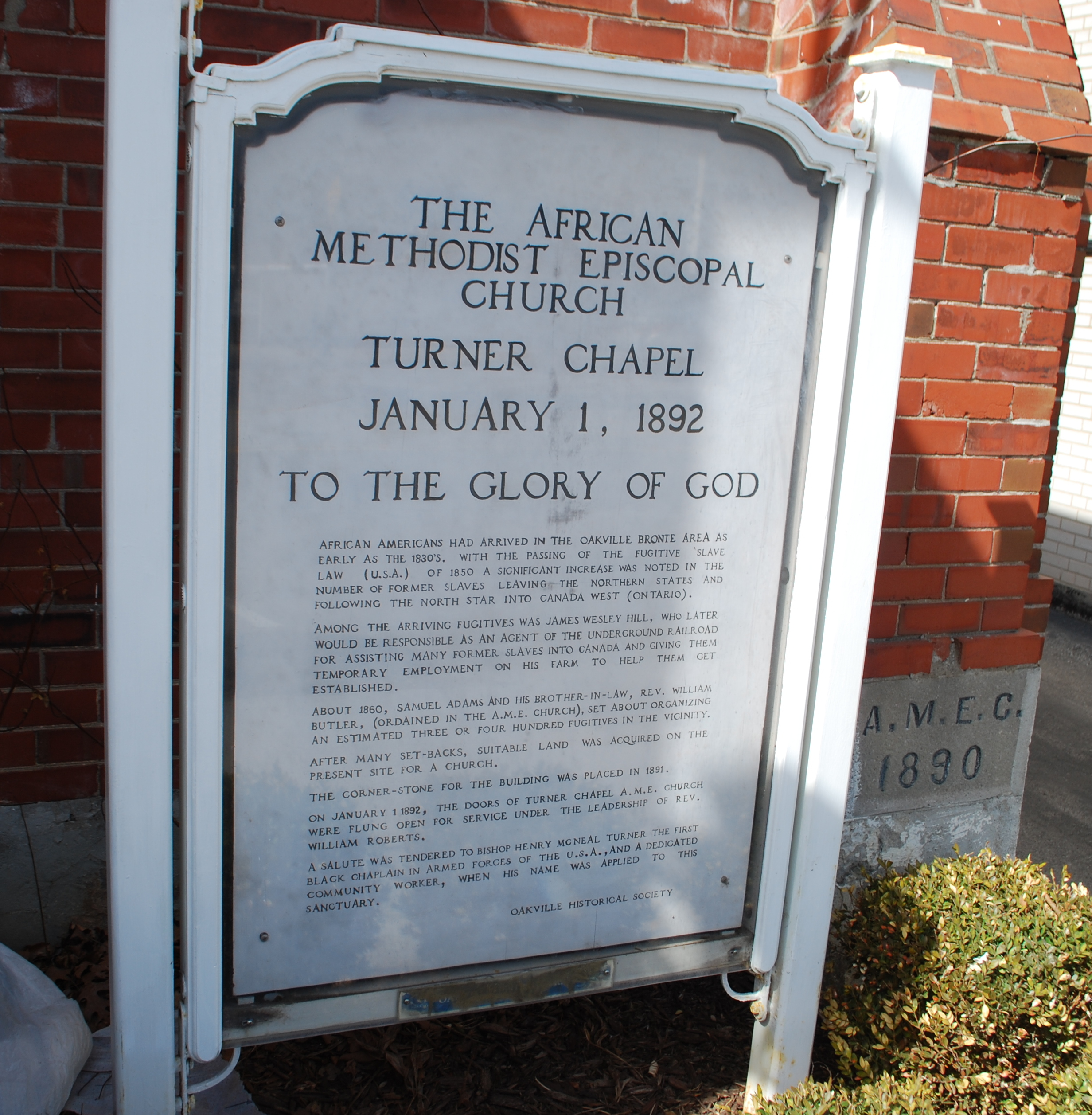
Oakville Heritage Signage.

Outside the present day building there is a sign erected by the Oakville Historic Society. It reads:

African Americans had arrived in the Oakville Bronte area as early as the 1830s. With the passing of the Fugitive Slave Act 1850 a significant increase was noted in the number of former slaves leaving the northern states and following the North Star into Canada West (Ontario). Among the arriving fugitives was James Wesley Hill who later would be responsible as an agent of the underground railroad for assisting many former slaves into Canada and giving them temporary employment on his farm to help them get established. About 1860, Samuel Adams and his brother-in-law, Rev. William Butler (ordained in the A.M.E. church) set about organizing an estimated three or four hundred fugitives in the vicinity. After many set-backs, suitable land was acquired on the present site for a church. The corner-stone for the building was placed in 1891. On January 1, 1892, the doors of Turner Chapel A.M.E. church were flung open for service under the leadership of Rev. William Roberts. A salute was tendered to Bishop Henry McNeal Turner the first black chaplain in Armed Forces of the U.S.A, and a dedicated community worker, when his name was applied to this sanctuary.

== Later years ==
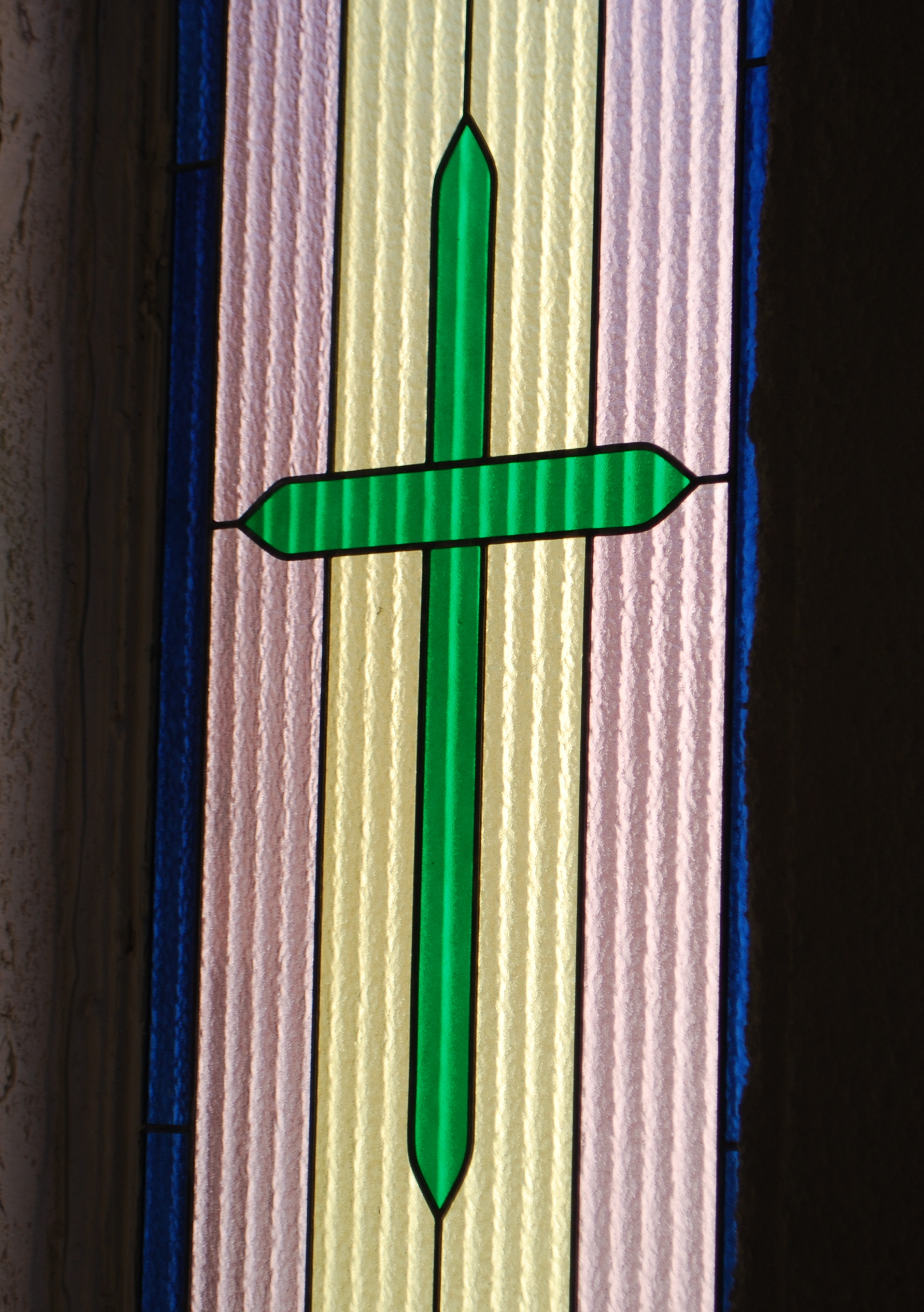
New stained glass windows.

Turner Chapel served as a community centre for the Afro American immigrants as well as a place of worship. Other notable members who maintained the Turner Chapel include Jeremiah Adams, a groundskeeper and the son of Samuel, and his wife, Eliza Butler, the daughter of co-founder Reverend Butler. As well, their descendants, Isabella Duncan, Martha Warner, and Warner's in-laws helped the church financially during the Great Depression.

In later years, members of the congregation began to disperse to other communities and in the later years of the twentieth century the property was leased to an offshoot of the Anglican Church with a small congregation of twelve members and a bishop. The Anglicans sought funding for renovations and the church, which was in danger of toppling because a weakened foundation, was repaired and outfitted with central heating and air conditioning. Money was also raised to replace the original windows with new stained glass and leaded panes.

In 2000 the owners of the Church placed the property on the market. The single lot housed both the church and the newer (1930's) manse. The site was ignored by developers because of the rigorous demands of the historic designation on the church. In effect, the church structure could not be modified or changed in any way. In 2002, Jed Gardner, a local antique dealer, decided to purchase both properties to be the location of his expanding business. Gardner worked with the Oakville Historical Society to accommodate the new purpose. The building was restored to become Turner Chapel Antiques and Appraisers, an antique shop, and was officially opened in February 2003 with representatives of the Oakville Historical Society, Heritage Oakville, as well as Black historian Alvin Duncan attending the invite-only ceremony.

== See also ==
- History of Methodism in the United States, including information about the foundation of the African Methodist Episcopalian Movement
- History of Black Canadians
