= Zarqa Nawaz =

Canadian film director and writer

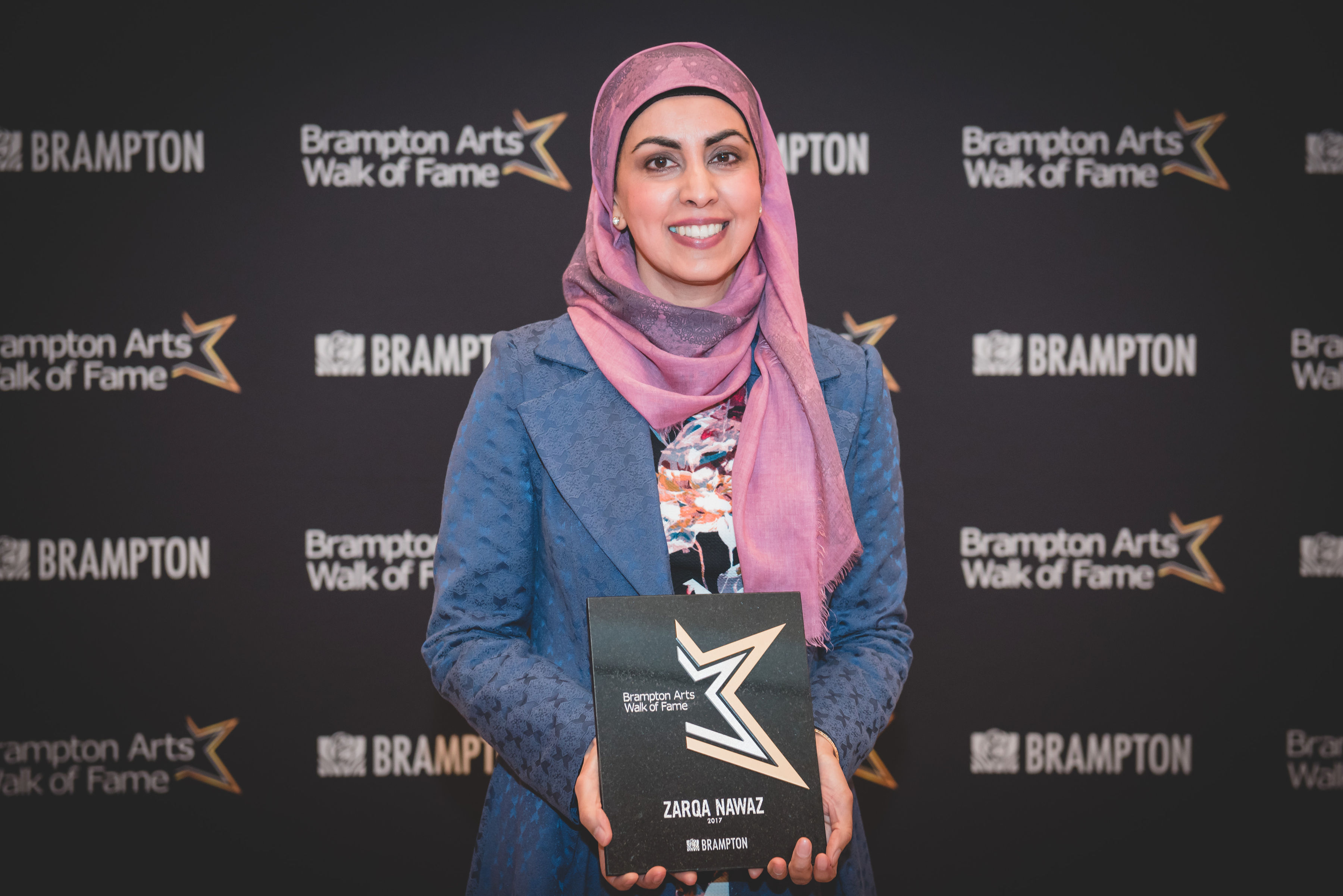
- Zarqa Nawaz is inducted into the Brampton Arts Walk of Fame
- Born: 1967 (age 58–59); Liverpool, England
- Education: University of Toronto; Ryerson Polytechnical Institute
- Occupations: Journalist, broadcaster, filmmaker, writer, director, producer
- Spouse: Married 1993–Present
- Children: 4
- Parent(s): Ali and Parveen Nawaz

Zarqa Nawaz (born 1967 in Liverpool, England) is a Canadian creator and producer for film and television, a published author, public speaker, journalist, and former broadcaster.

== Early life ==
Zarqa Nawaz was raised in the Toronto area and attended Chinguacousy Secondary School. Initially, Nawaz planned to go to medical school and completed a Bachelor of Science degree from Erindale College at the University of Toronto, graduating in 1990. She completed a second degree in journalism at Ryerson Polytechnical Institute in 1992.

== Career ==
She worked with CBC Radio, CBC Newsworld, CBC Television's The National, and CTV's Canada AM, and was an associate producer of several CBC Radio programs including Morningside. Her 1992 radio documentary The Changing Rituals of Death won multiple awards at the Ontario Telefest Awards. Stating that she became "bored of journalism," she took a summer film workshop at the Ontario College of Art & Design and began working as a filmmaker, using comedy to explore the relationships between Muslims and their neighbours in contemporary North America. She has described the goal of her production company, FUNdamentalist Films, as "putting the 'fun' back into fundamentalism."

In a 2003 interview with Prairie Dog Magazine, Nawaz said her screenplay Real Terrorists Don't Bellydance was "inspired by movies like True Lies and Executive Decision." She describes it as a "new genre of film," a cross between a terrorist flick and a comedy: "I call it a 'terrordy.'" Her use of humour in the television series Little Mosque on the Prairie attracted media attention ranging from CNN and The Jerusalem Post to The Colbert Report even before it aired, prompting the CBC to broadcast it months ahead of its original schedule.

In 2007, Nawaz created the internationally renowned CBC comedy series, Little Mosque on the Prairie, the world's first sitcom about a Muslim community living in the west. Little Mosque on the Prairie premiered to the highest ratings CBC ever had. The show went on to win a Gemini, and was nominated for Best Television Series – Comedy at the 2007 Directors Guild of Canada Awards. Internationally, Little Mosque won awards for Best International Television Series and Best Screenplay at the 2007 Roma Fiction Fest. In 2012, it made its American debut on Hulu, and is currently streaming on Amazon Prime. The Los Angeles Times said: "the genius of 'Mosque' is that the characters resonate with viewers all over the world." Nawaz's CBC show Little Mosque on the Prairie was inspired by her documentary Me and the Mosque. She felt that mosques would be run differently if imams were recruited from North America instead of being brought from overseas where cultural differences, especially when it came to women, affected how the imams behaved with their congregation.

After the success of Little Mosque on the Prairie, Nawaz successfully sold comedy pilots to ABC, CBS, NBC and Fox Studios.

Nawaz's memoir Laughing All the Way to the Mosque, published in 2014, was a shortlisted nominee for the 2015 Stephen Leacock Award. The book was also nominated for the Kobo Emerging Writer's Award, Saskatchewan Book Award of the Year, and Chatelaine magazine's Book Club Pick. "With a light touch and great humour," wrote reviewer Joanne Latimer in Maclean's magazine, "she pokes fun at Muslims and her Punjabi-Canadian clan. The anecdotes create a wry portrait of an immigrant daughter struggling against tradition, sexism and the shalwar kameez."

Nawaz was also as an advice columnist for the Globe & Mail from February 2012 to August 2012. In 2018, she was the host of The Morning Edition, Saskatchewan's CBC Radio's morning show, and in 2019 she was the anchor of CBC Saskatchewan's six o'clock news.

Nawaz received a Doctor of Divinity from the University of Saskatchewan for her interfaith work in the community. In recognition for her contribution to the arts, she was inducted into Brampton Arts Walk of Fame in 2019.

Nawaz started doing stand-up in 2020 and co-created the first Women and Non-Binary Open Mic in Regina where she headlined on opening night at The Cure. Prior to the COVID outbreak in March 2020, Nawaz did weekly open mics at The Cure, and monthly open mics at The Exchange, The Fat Badger, the Creative City Centre and The Social LOL in Regina, Saskatchewan.

In 2021, CBC Television announced the production of Zarqa, a web series in which Nawaz stars as a divorced Muslim woman reentering the dating scene. The series premiered on CBC Gem in May 2022. Nawaz's novel Jameela Green Ruins Everything was also published in 2022, and was a shortlisted Leacock Award finalist in 2023.

In 2026, Nawaz will debut her first play, Mosque Heist, at the Globe Theatre in Regina, Saskatchewan.

== Personal life ==
Zarqa Nawaz is the mother of four children and lives in Regina, Saskatchewan.

== Short films ==
- BBQ Muslims (1995) – Two Muslim brothers are accused of terrorism after their barbecue explodes in their backyard.
- Death Threat (1998) – A young Muslim novelist claims to have received a death threat in order to get her book published.
- Random Check (2005) – A young man, late for his wedding, turns to the media after being arrested at the airport as a result of racial profiling.
- Fred's Burqa (2005) – A stolen burqa leads to mistaken identity, a career change and true love.

== Screenplays ==
- Real Terrorists Don't Bellydance (2003) – a struggling actor inadvertently takes a role as a stereotypical Muslim terrorist, to his fiancée's chagrin.

== Feature-length films ==
- Me and the Mosque (2005) – documentary about the role of women in Islam, both throughout history and in contemporary Canada, told from a personal perspective.

== Television series (creator/writer) ==
- Little Mosque on the Prairie (2007-2012) – comedy about relations between Muslims and non-Muslims living in a fictional Saskatchewan town called Mercy.
- Zarqa (2022–Present) - comedy about a middle-aged Muslim divorcee who is looking to one-up her ex after finding out he is marrying a white yoga instructor half his age.

== Plays ==
- Mosque Heist (2026) – a caterer plans to rob a mosque on Ramadan in order to pay a loan shark and save her husband.
