= List of Black Canadians =

This is a list of notable Black Canadians, inclusive of multiracial people who are of partially Black African descent.

== A ==
- Elamin Abdelmahmoud, CBC Radio host
- Wayne Adams, first Black MLA in Nova Scotia, Liberal
- Lovell Adams-Gray, actor
- Oluniké Adeliyi, actress
- Alfons Adetuyi, film director and producer
- Robert Adetuyi, film director and screenwriter
- Randell Adjei, poet
- Ohenewa Akuffo, wrestler
- AHI, singer-songwriter
- Zanana Akande, former Ontario Member of Provincial Parliament and cabinet minister
- Philip Akin, director
- Dana Alexander, stand-up comedian
- Lincoln Alexander, first Black Member of Parliament in Canada, former lieutenant governor of Ontario
- Toya Alexis, R&B/pop singer and Canadian Idol season 1 finalist
- Aisha Alfa, actress and comedian
- Ismaila Alfa, radio host
- Thom Allison, actor
- Jean Alfred, first Black Canadian member of the National Assembly of Quebec
- Lillian Allen, dub poet
- Archie Alleyne, jazz musician
- a l l i e, R&B singer
- David Amber, sportscaster
- Kanika Ambrose, playwright
- Kimora Amour, drag entertainer
- Ammoye, reggae singer
- Prince Amponsah, actor
- Aba Amuquandoh, comedian
- Anastarzia Anaquway, drag entertainer
- Ezzrett Anderson, CFL player
- George Anderson (Canadian politician), British Columbia politician
- Granville Anderson, politician
- "Hollywood Jade" Anderson, dancer and choreographer
- Osborne Perry Anderson, resident of the Chatham-Kent area; involved in the raid at Harper's Ferry
- Ricky Anderson, athlete and writer
- Shamier Anderson, actor
- Virnetta Anderson, first Black Canadian city councillor in Calgary
- Jill Andrew, politician
- Marie-Joseph Angélique, executed for setting fire to Montreal
- Dominique Anglade, politician
- Georges Anglade, academic
- Vincent Anioke, writer
- Joel Anthony, NBA basketball player with the Detroit Pistons
- Tafari Anthony, rhythm and blues singer
- Trey Anthony, playwright (Da Kink in My Hair)
- Aphrose, soul/R&B singer
- Océane Aqua-Black, drag entertainer
- Aqyila, rhythm and blues singer
- Ardn, rapper
- Faith Arkorful, poet
- Bromley Armstrong, community activist
- Christine Armstrong, film editor
- Tré Armstrong, actress and choreographer
- Uzoma Asagwara, politician
- Brandon Ash-Mohammed, stand-up comedian
- Ryad Assani-Razaki, writer
- James Atebe, politician
- Yvonne Atwell, Nova Scotia's first Black female MLA, NDP
- Jean Augustine, former Member of Parliament, Black Canadian Cabinet Minister, former deputy Speaker of the House of Commons
- Edem Awumey, writer
- Malcolm Azania, writer and activist

== B ==
- B-Kool, rapper
- Clark Backo, actress
- Njacko Backo, musician
- Backxwash, rapper
- Britta Badour, poet
- Valérie Bah, writer and filmmaker
- Cameron Bailey, film critic and artistic director of the Toronto International Film Festival
- Donovan Bailey, first Canadian to win an Olympic gold medal in the 100 m sprint (1996 Atlanta)
- Maxine Bailey, executive director of the Canadian Film Centre
- Andrea Bain, journalist and talk show host (The Goods, The Social)
- Malia Baker, Botswanan-born actress
- James Baley, musician and dancer
- Tynomi Banks, drag entertainer
- Barbada de Barbades, drag entertainer
- Vivian Barbot, Bloc Québécois member of parliament for the riding of Papineau
- Emery Barnes, first Black Speaker of the British Columbia Legislative Assembly and CFL defensive end
- Quinton Barnes, R&B/electronica singer
- Alexis Baro, jazz and rhythm and blues trumpeter
- RJ Barrett, NBA player with the Toronto Raptors
- Rowan Barrett, former professional basketball player
- Daniel Bartholomew-Poyser, conductor
- Angèle Bassolé-Ouédraogo, poet
- Frank Baylis, politician
- Gary Beals, pop singer and Canadian Idol season 1 first runner-up
- Jacqueline Beaugé-Rosier, writer
- Kettly Beauregard, politician
- Maya Annik Bedward, filmmaker
- Shawn Belle, NHL prospect
- Frantz Benjamin, Montreal city councillor
- Anthony Bennett, NBA player (first overall pick in the 2013 NBA draft)
- Cle Bennett, actor
- Tyrone Benskin, actor and director; Member of Parliament; national vice president of ACTRA
- Zahra Bentham, actress
- Wanda Thomas Bernard, social worker, educator, senator
- Rima Berns-McGown, politician
- Lisa Berry, actress
- Ardon Bess, actor (Trailer Park Boys, King of Kensington)
- Carrie Best, activist and humanitarian, first black journalist
- James Calbert Best, diplomat and public servant
- Margarett Best, Ontario Member of Provincial Parliament and Cabinet Minister
- Salome Bey, jazz, blues and gospel singer (US citizen, Canadian permanent resident)
- Tim Biakabutuka, former NFL player
- Henry Bibb, author and abolitionist
- Bertrand Bickersteth, writer
- Charlie Biddle (Sr.), bassist
- Sonya Biddle, actress and politician
- Jully Black, R&B/pop singer
- Lindsay Blackett, Member of the Legislative Assembly of Alberta, the province's first Black cabinet minister
- Shane Book, writer
- Walter Borden, actor and playwright
- Boslen, rapper
- Cory Bowles, actor (Trailer Park Boys)
- Jeffrey Bowyer-Chapman, actor
- George Boyd, playwright
- D. M. Bradford, poet
- Lawrence Ytzhak Braithwaite, dub poet and novelist
- Dionne Brand, author
- Fred Brathwaite, NHL goalie
- Leonard Braithwaite, politician
- Rella Braithwaite, historian and journalist
- Wendy Motion Brathwaite, writer and musician
- Alma Faye Brooks, disco, soul and R&B singer
- Garnet Brooks, opera singer
- Phyllis Simmons Brooks, educator
- Shelton Brooks, popular music and jazz singer, songwriter, and pianist and vaudeville and musical theatre performer who wrote some of the biggest hits of the first third of the 20th century
- Khalilah Brooks, actress and children's educator
- Aisha Brown, actress and comedian
- Divine Brown, R&B/soul singer and musical theatre performer
- Denham Brown, professional basketball player in Europe
- Luther Brown, dancer and choreographer
- Rosemary Brown, British Columbia legislator; first Black woman to run for the leadership of a political party in Canada (the federal New Democratic Party)
- Measha Brueggergosman, opera singer
- Kim Brunhuber, journalistic
- Matthew Bullock, fugitive from the US who became a cause celebre in the 1920s
- Millicent Burgess, educator
- Nate Burleson, NFL player
- Tajon Buchanan, soccer player
- Sharon Burey, senator

== C ==
- Dayana Cadeau, professional bodybuilder
- Cadence Weapon, rapper
- Madwa-Nika Cadet, politician
- Daniel Caesar, R&B and soul singer
- Celina Caesar-Chavannes, politician
- Shawna Cain, Christian R&B singer
- Jaime Callica, actor and dancer
- Morgan Campbell, sportswriter and memoirist
- Herb Carnegie, star of Quebec professional hockey league
- Anson Carter, NHL star
- Rubin Carter, former boxer and activist
- Jazz Cartier, rapper
- Demo Cates, musician
- Mary Anne Chambers, former Ontario Member of Provincial Parliament and cabinet minister
- Myriam J. A. Chancy, writer
- Keshia Chanté, R&B singer and co-host of BET's 106 & Park
- Karen Chapman, film and television director
- David Chariandy, writer
- Gregory Charles, pop and gospel singer
- Miryam Charles, filmmaker
- Nuela Charles, singer
- Tanika Charles, soul and rhythm and blues singer
- Ajahnis Charley, comedian and television writer
- Charmaine, rapper
- Sean Cheesman, dancer and choreographer
- Ulrick Chérubin, mayor of Amos, Quebec, one of the first black mayors of any city in Quebec
- Jojo Chintoh, longtime Citytv reporter
- Ify Chiwetelu, CBC Radio host
- Choclair, rapper
- Rae Dawn Chong, actress (The Color Purple)
- Jillian Christmas, poet
- Jarvis Church, singer (The Philosopher Kings and solo) and music producer (Nelly Furtado)
- Clairmont the Second, rapper
- Austin Clarke, novelist (The Polished Hoe, Growing Up Stupid Under the Union Jack)
- Cheril N. Clarke, writer
- George Elliott Clarke, poet and playwright (Whylah Falls, George and Rue)
- Kevin Clarke, activist and politician
- Michèle Pearson Clarke, writer
- Edith Clayton, basket maker
- Bernadette Clement, mayor of Cornwall, Ontario
- Sebastian Clovis, Canadian Football League player and HGTV host
- Tristan Clovis, Canadian Football League player
- Devon Clunis, chief of Winnipeg Police Service and Canada's first Black Canadian chief of police
- Caroline Cole, vice-president, Business Development Bank of Canada
- Desmond Cole, journalist
- Lucretia Newman Coleman, writer
- Eleanor Collins, Canadian Jazz Singer, Television Host and Civic Leader. Known as Canada's First Lady of Jazz.
- Donté Colley, dancer
- Wayde Compton, poet
- Marilyn Cooke, filmmaker
- Anne Cools, Canada's first Black senator
- Afua Cooper, poet and historian
- Amanda Cordner, actress
- Lisa Michelle Cornelius, actress
- Michael Coteau, Ontario Member of Provincial Parliament
- Arisa Cox, television personality
- Deborah Cox, R&B singer
- Archie Crail, writer
- Laura Creavalle, professional bodybuilder
- Roger Cross, actor (24)
- Alcenya Crowley, educator and activist
- Vera Cudjoe, actress, producer, and educator; founder of Black Theatre Canada
- Alvin Curling, Ontario Member of Provincial Parliament and Speaker of the Legislature of Ontario
- Ayesha Curry, celebrity chef and television personality

== D ==
- Ola Dada, stand-up comedian
- Samuel Dalembert, NBA player
- Trevor Daley, NHL player with the Dallas Stars
- Jonathan David, soccer player for Juventus FC
- Alphonso Davies, soccer player for FC Bayern Munich
- Delos Davis, third Black lawyer in Canada and first black King's Counsel in the UK
- Hubert Davis, Academy Award-nominated documentary filmmaker
- Millie Davis (actress)
- Rob Davis, former York and Toronto city councillor
- Nigel Dawes, NHL player with the New York Rangers
- Desirée Dawson, musician
- Buddy Daye, former boxer and activist in Nova Scotia
- Jonathan de Guzman, soccer player
- Julian De Guzman, soccer player
- Dwayne De Rosario
- Tasha de Vasconcelos, model and actress
- David Defiagbon, boxer
- Mélanie Demers, dancer and choreographer
- Simone Denny, house music vocalist
- Daniel Denton, musician
- Adebe DeRango-Adem, poet
- Viola Desmond, beautician and civil rights activist, first Canadian woman to be depicted on Canadian currency
- Robert Nathaniel Dett, composer
- Rita Deverell, broadcaster and journalist, founder of Vision TV
- Devon, hip-hop musician ("Mr. Metro")
- Alpha Yaya Diallo, musician
- Paul Dillett, retired IFBB bodybuilder and businessman
- George Dixon, first Black world boxing champion in any weight class
- Fefe Dobson, pop punk singer
- Shirley Dorismond, politician
- James Douglas, early governor of Vancouver Island and British Columbia
- James W. Douglas, British Columbia MLA
- Orville Lloyd Douglas, poet, writer, and journalist
- Stan Douglas, installation artist
- Ed Douglas, film and television sound editor
- Zabrina Douglas, comedian
- Nathan Downer, television journalist
- Nigel Downer, actor and comedian
- Ray Downey, former boxer who medalled in the 1988 Olympics
- Antonio Michael Downing, writer, musician and broadcaster
- Riele Downs, actress
- Dream Warriors, hip hop duo
- Dwight Drummond, television journalist
- Joseph Drummond, civil rights activist
- Ali Duale, politician
- Christian Dubé, politician
- Emmanuel Dubourg, Quebec Liberal Party MNA for Viau
- Rob Ducey, former Major League Baseball player
- Alison Duke, film producer
- Alvin Duncan, World War II RCAF veteran and historian
- Arlene Duncan, actress, singer (Little Mosque on the Prairie)

== E ==
- Chuck Ealey, Canadian Football League player
- Gordon Earle, former NDP Member of Parliament for Halifax West
- Eldridge Eatman, sprinter and First World War soldier
- Amatoritsero Ede, writer
- Rosey Edeh, ET Canada reporter and former MSNBC meteorologist
- Aida Edemariam, writer
- Esi Edugyan, novelist
- Phil Edwards, track athlete
- Tyrone Edwards, television host
- Efajemue, jazz percussionist
- Thompson Egbo-Egbo, jazz pianist
- Francesca Ekwuyasi, writer and artist
- Jade Elektra, drag performer and HIV/AIDS educator
- Natasha Eloi, science reporter for Space channel
- Emanuel, rhythm and blues singer
- Ray Emery, NHL goalie
- Jonathan Emile, poet, composer and entrepreneur
- Tyler Ennis, Israeli Basketball Premier League basketball player, formerly NBA player with the Phoenix Suns
- Robert Esmie, Olympic gold medalist, 4x100 relay (Atlanta 1996)
- Gérard Étienne, writer
- Karena Evans, director
- Aisha Evelyna, actor and filmmaker
- Irdens Exantus, actor

== F ==
- Famous, rapper
- Perdita Felicien, track athlete
- Greg Fergus, politician
- Sedina Fiati, actress and theatre director
- Dominique Fils-Aimé, blues, jazz and rhythm and blues singer
- Dermain Finlayson, film and television sound editor
- Melanie Fiona, R&B singer
- Farley Flex, music promoter and Canadian Idol judge
- Cheryl Foggo, writer
- Melyssa Ford, professional model and actress
- Rose Fortune, first female police officer in Canada
- Cecil Foster, novelist and sociologist and biologist
- Rick Fox, NBA player
- Angelique Francis, blues singer
- Mayann Francis, former lieutenant governor of Nova Scotia and former director and CEO of the Nova Scotia Human Rights Commission
- Fil Fraser, writer
- Debby Friday, electronic musician
- Grant Fuhr, Hockey Hall of Fame goaltender (Edmonton Oilers), first Black hockey player to win the Stanley Cup
- Kelly Fyffe-Marshall, writer and filmmaker

== G ==
- Matt Galloway, CBC Radio host
- Harry Gairey, community activist
- Gayance, electronic/house DJ
- Robyn Gayle, former soccer player
- Kendall Gender, drag entertainer
- Shawn Gerrard, film and television director
- Mifflin Wistar Gibbs, merchant and member of Victoria City Council in the 1860s
- Chantal Gibson, poet
- Glenroy Gilbert, Olympic gold medalist, 4x100 relay (Atlanta 1996)
- Shai Gilgeous-Alexander, NBA player
- Ashley Iris Gill, cinematographer
- Malcolm Gladwell, journalist
- George Godfrey, former boxer originally from Prince Edward Island
- Patrice Goodman, actress
- Gary Goodridge, former mixed martial artist and kickboxer
- Kamala-Jean Gopie, activist and political candidate
- Audrey Gordon, politician
- Stephen Gough, Nova Scotia MLA
- Aubrey Graham, musician
- Dirk Graham, first NHL captain of African descent
- Jean-Luc Grand-Pierre, former NHL defenseman, currently playing in Europe
- Anais Granofsky, actor (Degrassi)
- Daniel Greaves, rock singer (The Watchmen)
- Marlene Green, community activist, educator, and NGO field worker
- Matthew Green, politician
- Marsha Greene, television writer and producer
- Robert Joseph Greene, writer
- Stanley G. Grizzle, judge, community activist
- Twila Grosse, politician

== H ==
- Brandon Hackett, actor, writer and comedian
- Wes Hall, businessman and Dragons' Den investor
- William Hall, first Nova Scotian, third Canadian and first Black person to be awarded the Victoria Cross
- Quancetia Hamilton, actress
- Sherman Hamilton, basketball player and sportscaster
- Kevin Hanchard, actor
- Suzy Hansen, politician
- Adrian Harewood, CBC Radio journalist and host
- Winnie Harlow, model
- Alicia K. Harris, filmmaker
- Harrison, electronic musician
- Faisal Hassan, politician
- Andrea Hazell, politician
- Wilson A. Head, sociologist and human rights activist
- Akeel Henry, record producer
- Sasha Leigh Henry, filmmaker and screenwriter
- Violet King Henry, first Black female lawyer in Canada
- Josiah Henson, former enslaved person, believed to have been the inspiration for the novel Uncle Tom's Cabin
- Dan Hill, pop singer-songwriter
- Daniel G. Hill, sociologist and first head of the Ontario Human Rights Commission
- Lawrence Hill, novelist and memoirist
- Darryl Hinds, actor and comedian
- Penny Hodge, activist
- Junior Hoilett
- Mark Holden, actor (Cyberpunk 2077, Captain Phillips, Deep State)
- Adrian Holmes, actor
- Jennifer Holness, film and television writer and producer
- Nicole Holness, singer and broadcaster
- Charmaine Hooper, soccer player; retired as leader in appearances and goals for the women's national team
- Nalo Hopkinson, science fiction author
- Jennifer Hosten, Canadian High Commissioner to Grenada and diplomat
- Barry Howson, basketball player at the 1964 Summer Olympics
- Frederick Langdon Hubbard, chair of the Toronto Transit Commission
- William Peyton Hubbard, former Toronto alderman, controller and acting mayor
- Jada Shada Hudson, drag entertainer
- Kimberly Huie, actress
- Mitzie Hunter, politician
- Nate Husser, rapper
- Atiba Hutchinson, professional footballer for Besiktas J.K.
- Faris Hytiaa, stand-up comedian

== I ==
- Israel Idonije, defensive end for the NFL's Chicago Bears
- Marci Ien, politician, former CTV News journalist
- Daniel Igali, Olympic gold medalist in wrestling (Sydney 2000)
- Jarome Iginla, Hockey Hall of Fame inductee, NHL All-Star and Olympic gold medalist (Salt Lake 2002, Vancouver 2010)
- Tony Ince, politician
- Dionne Irving, writer
- Orin Isaacs, bandleader (Open Mike with Mike Bullard, The Mike Bullard Show), musician and music producer
- Tajja Isen, actress/singer (Atomic Betty)
- Ayisha Issa, actress
- Richard Iton, academic and writer

== J ==
- Albert Jackson, mailcarrier and first Black mailman
- John Henry Jackson, football player and restaurateur
- Ovid Jackson, former Member of Parliament and former mayor of Owen Sound
- Sammy Jackson, jazz and rhythm and blues singer
- Ellyn Jade, actress and model
- Angela James, professional hockey player and Hockey Hall of Fame inductee
- Aurora James, fashion designer
- Stephan James, actor
- Yolande James, Quebec Minister of Immigration and Cultural Communities
- Yazmeen Jamieson, professional soccer player
- Sterling Jarvis, actor and musician
- Yves Jarvis, musician
- JayWood, musician
- Fayolle Jean, actor
- Fayolle Jean Jr., actor
- Michaëlle Jean, former broadcaster and former governor general of Canada, the first Black person in Canadian history appointed to that position
- Schelby Jean-Baptiste, actress
- Garihanna Jean-Louis, comedian, actress and writer
- Jelleestone, rapper
- Jemeni, singer and broadcaster
- Ferguson Jenkins, baseball star and first Canadian elected to the (US) Baseball Hall of Fame
- Marlene Jennings, politician
- Harry Jerome, sprinter and first Canadian to hold an official track and field world record
- Moe Jeudy-Lamour, actor
- Jhyve, rhythm and blues singer
- Aisha Sasha John, writer
- Lyndon John X, reggae musician
- Ben Johnson, Olympic sprinter disqualified in 1988 drug scandal
- Chris Johnson, boxer
- Clark Johnson, actor (Homicide: Life on the Street)
- Debbie Johnson, rhythm and blues singer
- Hal Johnson, television health and fitness personality
- Kirk Johnson, boxer
- Louisa Ann Johnson, merchant and church supporter
- Molly Johnson, rock and jazz vocalist
- Rocky Johnson, professional wrestler
- Taborah Johnson, singer, actor and radio broadcaster
- Jordan Johnson-Hinds, actor
- Denham Jolly, broadcast executive
- El Jones, writer
- Mark Jones, sportscaster for ESPN and ABC
- Nathanael Jones, poet
- Oliver Jones, jazz pianist
- Paul Jones, sportscaster and Toronto Raptors radio play-by-play voice
- Rocky Jones, politician and activist
- Spider Jones, journalist and former boxer
- Clifton Joseph, poet and broadcaster
- Cory Joseph, NBA player
- David Joseph, basketball coach and former college player
- Devoe Joseph, professional basketball player
- Natilien Joseph, politician
- Demetrius Joyette, actor
- Akiel Julien, actor
- Junia-T, rapper
- Marie-Ève Juste, film director

== K ==
- K-Anthony, gospel singer
- K'Naan, hip-hop musician and singer
- k-os, hip-hop musician
- Adria Kain, R&B singer
- Evander Kane, professional ice hockey player
- Tommy Kane, former NFL wide receiver
- KAPRI, dance/pop singer
- Aristote Kavungu, writer
- Arielle Kayabaga, politician
- Kaytranada, musician
- Marlon Kazadi, actor
- Hisham Kelati, comedian
- Kaie Kellough, writer
- Janaya Khan, activist
- Kiara (Dimitri Nana-Côté), drag entertainer
- Rawlson King, municipal politician in Ottawa
- Nam Kiwanuka, television host and journalist
- Maka Kotto, author and actor from Quebec elected to Canadian Parliament in 2004 (Bloc Québécois)
- Pierre Kwenders, musician

== L ==
- Sonnet L'Abbé, poet and critic
- Dany Laferrière, writer, elected to the Académie française
- Artis Lane, sculptor and artist
- Jonathan Langdon, actor
- Sam Langford, former boxer
- Georges Laraque, NHL player
- Tobi Lark, jazz, blues and gospel singer
- Cyle Larin, professional footballer playing for Besiktas J.K.
- Richie Laryea
- Mélissa Laveaux, musician
- Olivier Le Jeune, believed to have been the first slave purchased in what later became Quebec
- Karen LeBlanc, actress
- Didier Leclair, writer
- Ranee Lee, jazz singer
- Michael Lee-Chin, business leader
- Maryse Legagneur, filmmaker
- Marie-Evelyne Lessard, actress
- Sandra Levy, Olympic field hockey player
- Alan Shane Lewis, comedian and television host
- Andrea Lewis, actress (Degrassi: The Next Generation)
- Daurene Lewis, first Black woman mayor in North America
- Glenn Lewis, R&B singer
- Joseph Lewis, fur trader
- Lennox Lewis, professional boxer (Olympic gold medallist and three-time heavyweight champion)
- Leslyn Lewis, politician
- Ray Lewis, first Canadian-born Black person to win a medal in the Olympics
- Sharon Lewis, journalist
- Murray Lightburn, rock singer-songwriter (The Dears)
- Laura Mae Lindo, politician
- Travis Lindsay, comedian
- Angelica Lisk-Hann, film and television stunt performer and coordinator
- Little X, director
- Kay Livingstone, actress, broadcaster and activist
- Marieme Lo, professor of African Studies, Women and Gender Studies, and the School of Cities at the University of Toronto
- Rich London, rapper
- Gilson Lubin, comedian
- Canisia Lubrin, writer
- Nicole Lyn, actress

== M ==
- Kaycee Madu, Alberta MLA
- Maestro, hip-hop musician, first Canadian rapper to have a Top 40 hit in Canada
- Jamaal Magloire, NBA player
- Atlee Mahorn, sprinter
- Rebecca Makonnen, television and radio broadcaster
- Ahdri Zhina Mandiela, director
- Egerton Marcus, boxer
- Amanda Marshall, pop singer-songwriter
- Yolanda T. Marshall, children's book author
- Mike Marson, second Black player in NHL history
- Lesra Martin, crown attorney and speaker; in his youth was involved in freeing Rubin Carter
- Russell Martin, MLB player
- Boman "Bomanizer" Martinez-Reid, comedian and social media content creator
- Beverly Mascoll, entrepreneur and community leader
- Marie-Sœurette Mathieu, writer
- Yasmine Mathurin, documentary filmmaker
- Denise Matthews, former model, actress and lead singer of Vanity 6, turned evangelist
- Rueben Mayes, former NFL player
- Robyn Maynard, writer
- Suzette Mayr, writer
- Alexis Mazurin, CBC Radio host
- Melchior Mbonimpa, writer
- Tawiah M'carthy, writer and actor
- Trent McClellan, comedian
- Kandyse McClure, actress (Battlestar Galactica)
- Elijah McCoy, origin of "the real McCoy", inventor
- Howard McCurdy, Member of Parliament, first black male to run for the leadership of a political party (the federal New Democratic Party)
- Jay W. McGee, musician
- Wayne McGhie, musician
- Yanna McIntosh, actress
- Tony McKegney, NHL player
- Berend McKenzie, writer
- Kwame McKenzie, psychiatrist and CEO, Wellesley Institute
- Katherine McKittrick, writer
- Mark McKoy, Olympic gold medalist, 110 m hurdles (Barcelona 1992)
- Brandon Jay McLaren, actor (Power Rangers S.P.D.)
- Kairo McLean, reggae musician
- Tessa McWatt, novelist
- Stella Meghie, film director and screenwriter
- Marie-Françoise Mégie, politician
- Traci Melchor, television personality
- Micah Mensah-Jatoe, actor
- Don Meredith, politician
- Mireille Métellus, actress
- Nega Mezlekia, writer
- Marjorie Michel, politician
- Haviah Mighty, rapper
- Kim Katrin Milan, writer
- Myst Milano, musician
- Rollie Miles, CFL player
- Shadrach Minkins, American-born fugitive enslaved person rescued from federal custody in Boston in 1851 who settled in Montreal
- Chris Moise, Toronto city councillor
- Moka Only, rapper of the Swollen Members
- Firmin Monestime, mayor of Mattawa, Ontario; first Black mayor in Canada
- Andrew Moodie, actor and playwright
- Tanya Moodie, actress based in the United Kingdom
- Roger Mooking, chef
- Harrison Mooney, journalist and memoirist
- Corteon Moore, actor
- Tracy Moore, journalist
- Annmarie Morais, writer
- Carlos Morgan, R&B/soul singer
- Dwayne Morgan, spoken word artist
- Vanessa Morgan, actress and singer (from Ottawa)
- Amber Morley, Toronto city councillor
- MorMor, musician
- Paul S. Morton, pastor of St. Stephen Baptist Church in New Orleans, a church with over 20,000 members
- Jamie Moses, politician
- Aaron Albert Mossell, first Black person to graduate from the University of Pennsylvania Law School
- Nathan Francis Mossell, first Black person to graduate from the University of Pennsylvania Medical School
- Joseph Motiki, television host
- Thamela Mpumlwana, actor
- Sheila Murray, writer
- Téa Mutonji, writer
- Jamaal Myers, Toronto city councillor

== N ==
- Blaise Ndala, writer
- Haydain Neale, R&B/soul singer (Jacksoul)
- Ray Neufeld, former NHL player
- Kathleen Newman-Bremang, writer and broadcaster
- Carlos Newton, former mixed martial artist (UFC Welterweight Champion)
- Will Niava, filmmaker
- Andrew Nicholson, NBA player
- Cecily Nicholson, poet
- Widemir Normil, actor
- Bienvenu-Olivier Ntumba, politician
- Alexander Nunez, writer and actor
- Darnell Nurse, NHL player
- Kia Nurse, professional basketball player
- Richard Nurse, former CFL player
- Sarah Nurse, hockey player

== O ==
- Samuel Oghale Oboh, first person of African descent to be president of the 110-year old Royal Architectural Institute of Canada
- OBUXUM, musician and record producer
- Kataem O'Connor, actor
- David Nandi Odhiambo, writer
- Charles Officer, film director
- Ryan Ofei, gospel singer
- Kardinal Offishall, rapper
- Lana Ogilvie, fashion model/TV hostess
- Thomas Antony Olajide, actor
- Donald Oliver, first Black senator from Nova Scotia
- Tolu Oloruntoba, poet
- Willie O'Ree, first Black hockey player in the National Hockey League
- Gabriel Osson, writer
- Milton Ottey, world champion high jumper
- Ouri, electronic musician and DJ

== P ==
- Henri Pardo, filmmaker
- Brenda Paris, activist and politician
- John Paris Jr., hockey coach
- Percy Paris, politician
- Stuart Parker, leader of the Green Party of British Columbia 1993 to 2000
- Amanda Parris, broadcaster and writer
- PartyNextDoor, R&B singer
- Annamie Paul, politician, leader of the Green Party of Canada, the first black leader of a federal party in Canada
- Zoë Peak, actress
- Michaela Pereira, journalist
- Kayla Perrin, writer
- Jaime Peters, soccer player
- Oscar Peterson, jazz pianist
- Anthony Phelps, Haitian-Canadian writer
- M. NourbeSe Philip, poet, novelist and essayist
- Abu Ameenah Bilal Philips, Islamic scholar and founder of the Islamic Online University
- Frédéric Pierre, actor
- Joseph Jomo Pierre, actor and playwright
- Carmine Pierre-Dufour, filmmaker (Mahalia Melts in the Rain, Fanmi)
- Shailyn Pierre-Dixon, actress
- Burr Plato, town councillor for Niagara Falls (1886–1901)
- poolblood, indie pop singer-songwriter
- Juliette Powell, television host, first Black Miss Canada (1989)
- Rev. Richard Preston, anti-slavery activist and founder of African Baptist Association of Nova Scotia
- Prevail, rapper of the Swollen Members
- Chad Price, singer-songwriter
- Althea Prince, writer
- Garth Prince, children's entertainer
- Ralph Prosper, actor
- Will Prosper, activist and filmmaker
- Dwayne Provo, Canadian Football League player

== Q ==
- Quanteisha, R&B singer
- Quddus, MTV VJ

== R ==
- Rob Rainford, chef
- Micheline Rawlins, first Black woman appointed to the Ontario Court of Justice
- Savannah Ré, singer
- Pokey Reddick, Stanley Cup champion, Edmonton Oilers goalie
- Tiana Reid, poet and academic
- Zalika Reid-Benta, writer
- Gloria Reuben, actress (ER)
- Cabbie Richards, radio personality
- Cara Ricketts, actress
- Charles Lightfoot Roman, surgeon
- Jayde Riviere, soccer player
- Jackie Richardson, jazz, blues and gospel singer
- Jael Richardson, writer
- Kim Richardson, pop, jazz, blues and gospel singer
- Sam Richardson, athlete
- Bill Riley, third black player in NHL history
- Charles Roach, civil rights lawyer; activist in the black community in Toronto; many contributions to the wider community in Toronto; a founder of what was known as Caribana in 1967
- Martin Roach, actor
- Chris Robinson, actor and comedian
- Karen Robinson, actress
- Kenny Robinson, stand-up comedian, TV host
- Percy Rodriguez, actor
- George Rogers, former mayor of Leduc, Alberta, current MLA for the riding of Leduc-Beaumont-Devon
- Lucah Rosenberg-Lee, film director
- Michelle Ross, drag entertainer
- Ronnie Rowe, actor
- RT!, director
- Calvin Ruck, senator
- Donovan "Razor" Ruddock, professional boxer
- Kudakwashe Rutendo, actress

== S ==
- Sacha, country singer
- Shakura S'Aida, jazz and blues singer
- Rodney Saint-Éloi, poet
- Elizabeth St. Philip, documentary film and television producer and director
- Kwasi Songui, actor
- Beverley Salmon, politician
- Liselle Sambury, writer
- Samito, musician
- Jacob Sampson, actor and playwright
- Lance "Aquakultre" Sampson, soul and R&B musician
- Chris Sandiford, actor and comedian
- Robert Edison Sandiford, writer
- Sarahmée, rapper
- Yolanda Sargeant, soul singer
- Mairuth Sarsfield, novelist
- SATE, rock singer
- Charles R. Saunders, writer
- John Saunders, sports journalist for ESPN and ABC
- Mark Saunders, chief of the Toronto Police Service
- Sterling Scott, comedian
- Jasmine Sealy, writer
- Alison Sealy-Smith, actress
- Djanet Sears, playwright
- Sagine Sémajuste, actress
- Olive Senior, poet and short story writer
- Mike Shabb, rapper
- Shad, hip hop musician
- Mary Ann Shadd, first female newspaper publisher
- Jackie Shane, R&B singer
- Jairus Sharif, jazz musician
- Tony Sharpe, sprinter
- Lisa Shaw, house and R&B/soul singer
- David Shepherd, politician
- Anthony Sherwood, actor
- Simisola Shittu (born 1999), British-born Canadian basketball player for Ironi Ness Ziona of the Israeli Basketball Premier League
- Liberty Silver, R&B and jazz singer
- Makeda Silvera, novelist
- Angela Simmonds, politician
- Wayne Simmonds, NHL player for the Toronto Maple Leafs
- Denis Simpson, actor and children's television host
- Maxine Simpson, actress and nurse
- Dylan Sinclair, rhythm and blues singer
- Eon Sinclair, bassist (Bedouin Soundclash)
- Judi Singh, jazz singer
- Shawn Singleton, actor/musician
- Zal Sissokho, musician
- Skiifall, rapper
- Slakah the Beatchild, soul/R&B singer and record producer
- Makyla Smith, actress
- So Sus, electronic musician
- Frances-Anne Solomon, film producer, director, distributor
- Catherine Souffront, actress and singer
- Spek Won, rapper
- Chris Spence, director of education of the Hamilton-Wentworth District School Board and then the Toronto District School Board, previously a CFL running back
- Tony "Wild T" Springer, blues rock guitarist
- Donna-Michelle St. Bernard, theatre director and playwright
- Benjamin St-Juste, American football player
- Paul Stalteri
- Tank Standing Buffalo, artist and animator
- Erroll Starr, musician
- Gavin Stephens, comedian
- Ordena Stephens-Thompson, actress
- Anthony Stewart, NHL player with the Florida Panthers
- Chris Strikes, filmmaker
- Jordan Subban, professional ice hockey defenceman
- Karl Subban, educator, writer and "hockey dad"
- Malcolm Subban, professional ice hockey goaltender
- P. K. Subban, NHL ice hockey defenceman
- Cree Summer, actress, singer, and comedian
- Bruny Surin, Olympic gold medalist, 4x100 relay (1996 Atlanta)
- David (Sudz) Sutherland, director
- Robert Sutherland, first Black lawyer in Canada
- Michelle Sweeney, jazz and blues singer
- Sylvia Sweeney, television broadcaster and former basketball player

== T ==
- Tymika Tafari, actress
- Tamia, R&B singer and actress
- Tasha the Amazon, rapper
- Bobby Taylor and his band, The Vancouvers, a popular Motown act who were instrumental in getting The Jackson 5 signed to the label and produced the earliest Jackson 5 records
- Dione Taylor, jazz singer
- Glenn Taylor, writer
- Julian Taylor, rock musician (Staggered Crossing)
- Tamara Taylor, actress (Bones)
- Angella Taylor-Issajenko, sprinter
- Tebey, country and pop singer-songwriter
- Angeline Tetteh-Wayoe, radio personality
- Kai Thomas, writer
- Kwasi Thomas, actor and comedian
- Ralph Thomas, activist and former amateur boxer
- Tremaine Thomas, film and television hairstylist and wig designer
- Michael Thompson, current Toronto city councillor
- Nicholas Marcus Thompson, human rights advocate
- Tristan Thompson, NBA player
- Thrust, rapper
- TiKA, R&B singer
- Tizzo, rapper
- Töme, reggae musician
- Asha Tomlinson, journalist
- Thyrone Tommy, filmmaker
- Tory Lanez, hip hop musician
- Laurie Townshend, filmmaker
- Yanic Truesdale, actor (Gilmore Girls)
- Ayo Tsalithaba, actor and artist
- Kreesha Turner, R&B singer

== U ==
- Louise Uwacu, writer

== V ==
- Dom Vallie, rapper
- Vanity, performer
- Kevin Vidal, comedian and actor
- Christian Vincent, actor (Noah's Arc)
- Jon Vinyl, R&B/soul singer
- Nerene Virgin, CBC anchor of Saturday Report, Newsworld, Newsworld International, co-star of Today's Special
- Clement Virgo, director

== W ==
- Rinaldo Walcott, professor and Canada Research Chair at OISE/University of Toronto
- Abraham Beverley Walker, first Canadian-born Black lawyer
- Carol Wall, social activist and labour leader
- Adrian Walters, actor
- Dwight Walton, former Team Canada Basketball player
- Joel Ward, NHL player
- John Ware, former enslaved Alberta cowboy
- Syrus Marcus Ware, artist, activist and professor
- Damian Warner, Olympian
- Mark Warner, lawyer and politician
- Jackie Washington, blues musician
- Bahia Watson, actress and playwright
- Benjamin Charles Watson, actor
- Dawn Tyler Watson, blues singer
- The Weeknd, R&B singer-songwriter
- Kevin Weekes, NHL goalie
- Wesli, musician
- Juanita Westmoreland-Traoré, first appointed Black judge in the history of Quebec
- Bill White, musician and political candidate
- Jack White, union activist
- Portia White, gospel singer
- William A. White, only Black officer of the No. 2 Construction Battalion
- Dwight Whylie, journalist
- Andrew Wiggins, NBA player with the Golden State Warriors
- Aileen Williams, activist and founding member of the Canadian Women's Negro Association (CANEWA)
- Charmaine Williams, politician
- Desai Williams, sprinter
- Genelle Williams, actress
- Ian Williams, poet and novelist
- Leighton Alexander Williams, actor and playwright
- Michael Williams, MuchMusic VJ
- Nigel Shawn Williams, actor
- Odario Williams, broadcaster and musician
- Stephen Williams, director
- Tonya Lee Williams, longtime actress on The Young and the Restless
- Trevor C. Williams, former Team Canada Basketball player
- Tyrone Williams, former CFL and NFL wide receiver
- Nigel Wilson, baseball player (first draft pick by the Florida Marlins, 2nd overall, in the 1992 Expansion Draft)
- Paul Winn, human rights activist, director of Canadian Race Relations Foundation, former television personality
- Mary Matilda Winslow, first Black female graduate of the University of New Brunswick
- Maurice Dean Wint, actor
- Ken Wiwa, journalist and author, and son of executed Nigerian political prisoner Ken Saro-Wiwa
- WondaGurl, record producer
- Daniel Woodrow, comedian
- Peter Worrell, NHL player

== Y ==
- Kevin Yarde, television meteorologist and politician
- D'bi Young, dub poet
- Marcia Young, CBC Radio broadcaster and host of The World This Hour
- Tony "Master T" Young, MuchMusic
- Hannan Younis, actress and comedian

== Z ==
- Richardson Zéphir, comedian and actor
- Zoey Williams, first Black Woman to fly a Boeing 777 for Air Canada

== See also ==
- List of Canadians
- Black Canadians in Montreal
- Black Canadians in Ontario
- Black Nova Scotians
- Who's Who in Black Canada
