= Aileen Williams =

Black Canadian activist (1924–2015)

Aileen Theodora Williams
- Born: Aileen Gollinger; 1924; Toronto, Ontario, Canada
- Died: August 31, 2015 (aged 90–91); Mississauga, Ontario, Canada
- Known for: Founding member of CANEWA

Aileen Theodora Williams (1924-2015) was a Black Canadian activist and founding member of the Canadian Women's Negro Association (CANEWA).

== Early life ==
The daughter of Frances Louise Gollinger and William Bertram Gollinger, Williams was born Aileen Gollinger in Toronto and educated at Duke of York Public School and Northern Secondary School. She attended the First Baptist Church in Toronto, and often attended events at the Universal Negro Improvement Association Hall (UNIA) during her teenage years.

== Career ==
In 1940, Williams joined as a member of the Dilettantes (later known as Canadian Negro Women's Association), a social club of Black women in Toronto. Along with Kay Livingstone and Phyllis Simmons Brooks, Williams was instrumental in reshaping the group to form the Canadian Women's Negro Club (later Association), CANEWA, which focused on addressing social problems and establishing scholarships and bursaries in support of Black youth. She also worked closely with Penny Hodge. She served as secretary for a number of years and as president on two occasions, 1953-1954 and 1973–1974. In 1973 she played a crucial role in organizing the first meeting of the National Congress of Black Women of Canada (NCBWC), which was held at the Westbury Hotel in Toronto. It took place after 18 months of planning and saw 200 black women in attendance including representation from the Coloured Women's Club (Montreal), the Negro Women's Professional Club (Halifax), the Grand Order of the Eastern Star (Toronto), amongst others all to focus on "a serious consideration of the issues vital to the Black community." Williams was actively involved in the Ontario Black History Society, serving as its vice-president in the 1980s.

In addition to her volunteer work, Williams held jobs at a number of companies and government organizations including Simpson's department store in Toronto, Metro-Goldwyn Mayer Pictures of Canada, the Canadian Broadcasting Corporation, and the Ontario Ministry of Revenue.

Aileen Williams was presented with an Ontario Senior Achievement Award in 2008. When speaking to The Toronto Observer at the event, William's said in regard to African Canadians living in Toronto in 1940, “We never used to have any voice back then,” she said. “Things have improved a lot.”

She died in Mississauga on August 31, 2015. Williams is one of nine women included as posthumous honourees in the book "100 Accomplished Black Canadian Women - 2016 1st Edition" by Ms. Dauna E Jones-Simmonds, Hon. Dr. Jean Augustine and Dr. Denise O'Neil Green.
