= Vera Cudjoe =

Trinidadian-Canadian actress, producer and educator (1928–2026)

- Born: 1928; Trinidad
- Died: 22 July 2026 (aged 97–98)
- Education: Ryerson University, Ontario Theological Seminary
- Years active: 1962–2026
- Organization: Black Theatre Canada
- Known for: Black Theatre Canada
- Notable work: A Raisin in the Sun (1978; first Canadian production); More About Me (1979); A Caribbean Midsummer Night’s Dream (1983); One More Stop on the Freedom Train (1984–86); Arts Against Apartheid Festival (1986); Jumping the Broom (2011)
- Awards: Queen Elizabeth II Silver Jubilee Medal; African-Canadian Achievement Award

Vera Cudjoe (1928 – 22 July 2026) was a Trinidadian-Canadian actress, producer and educator. She founded Black Theatre Canada (BTC; 1973–1988), a youth and community-oriented institution which helped train and launch the career of numerous Black performers and artists in North America. Among the Theatre's legacies are Delroy Lindo, Arlene Duncan, Leon Bibb, Jackie Richardson, Joe Sealy, Tom Butler, Philip Akin, and Ahdri Zhina Mandiela.

Cudjoe grew up in Trinidad, trained as a nurse in England, and moved to Toronto in 1960. She began to pursue theatre and performance in 1962, making contact with Studio Lab and Toronto Workshop Productions. The lack of opportunities for Black youth motivated her to pursue the establishment of BTC. Under her leadership, BTC produced well-received and well-attended works, including the first Canadian production of A Raisin in the Sun (1978) and the Dora Mavor Moore Award-winning A Caribbean Midsummer Night's Dream (1983). One More Stop on the Freedom Train (1984), a musical about the Underground Railroad in Ontario, toured Ontario in 1985 and played at Expo 86 in Vancouver as part of the Arts Against Apartheid Festival.

She acted in a number of works, including E.N.G. (1989), Rookie Blue (2010), and Jumping the Broom (2011).

For her contributions, Cudjoe received the Queen Elizabeth II Silver Jubilee Medal and the African-Canadian Achievement Award in Arts and Entertainment.

== Life and career ==
=== Early life ===
Vera Cudjoe was born in Trinidad in 1928, the youngest of six children. She grew up on the island and attended Naparima Girls' High School. At the time in Trinidad—which was not yet independent from the United Kingdom—higher education was only available to those with the means to access it, and to the very few who received "colonial scholarships" for study in England. Cudjoe received one such scholarship which took her to England to train in midwifery and nursing, among the only options open to racialised women at the time. During her time in England, Cudjoe became involved in the West Indian Students' Union and was introduced to performance through a friend who was an actor. She participated in hospital performances and began to cultivate a love for acting.

The expectation for scholarship recipients was that British-trained young women would return to their respective colonies and assume leadership roles as matrons and ward sisters. Cudjoe therefore returned to Trinidad in 1955 and worked for five years at San Fernando General Hospital. She nonetheless "began to feel very restless" and searched for opportunities in the United States, since she was excited by the idea of working in the U.S. and had a sister in New York City. Due to U.S. laws restricting immigration, however, she instead sought and found employment at Toronto General Hospital in Canada. (A mere 2,598 immigrants from Trinidad and Tobago appear on official U.S. records between 1960 and 1965, in contrast to 22,367 between 1966 and 1970.)

=== Career change in Toronto ===
Cudjoe landed in Toronto on 13 December 1960, and became a registered nurse (RN) in Toronto General Hospital's neurosurgical ward. (Note: Cudjoe's qualifications were accepted without additional requirements by Ontario's provincial licensing standards. In most cases, however, immigrant nurses faced significant obstacles to skill recognition even with comparable training (Flynn 2016, 505).) In her adjustment to the Canadian practice of nursing, Cudjoe found the culture to emphasise administrative duties and rules over patient care, and became disappointed with the field as a result. She has recounted an incident involving a paraplegic patient, which she described as the "one time she lost her cool" and which caused her to be transferred to another ward:

[The patient] was asking me some questions, and I was just talking with him. But it was also time to change our shift. It was 4 o'clock and everybody was looking at the clock and you had to move. And... "Just leave the patient, come on, we have to change the notes," and so on... I lost my cool that one time. They called me and I said: Is this nursing? How could you do that? How could you just leave a patient who's needing... [to] be more concerned about the time and your statistics and so on?

Cudjoe began to look for other career paths. On the advice of a friend who had quit nursing to work at Canadian Broadcasting Corporation (CBC), she began studying at Ryerson University, initially to become a radio broadcaster. She attended for two semesters but returned to nursing due to financial constraints. In the meantime, she continued theatre through Ernie Schwarz's Studio Lab. Among her formative experiences from this time was Schwarz's production of Threepenny Opera at the University of Sudbury, in which Cudjoe was cast for the role of Jenny Diver. Cudjoe was also selected for training at George Luscombe's Toronto Workshop Productions.

=== Black Theatre Canada ===
As it became apparent that opportunities for a Black actress in Canada were few and far between, Cudjoe had the thought that there may be a place for a Black theatre group. She sought the help of Ed Smith, founder of the Buffalo Black Drama Workshop, who travelled to Toronto to stage a play by Ron Milner titled Who's Got His Own to "see if Toronto is ready for Black professional theatre". The cohort at the Underground Railroad, a popular Black restaurant in Toronto, assisted with accommodation and venue. The work was presented for a single night at the First Unitarian Congregation of Toronto to a full audience, and Cudjoe was encouraged to pursue the theatre group.

Cudjoe's efforts led to the founding of Black Theatre Canada (BTC) in 1973. Through the project, Cudjoe hoped to give expression to Black—especially Afro-Caribbean—culture in Canada and to train young talent from the Black community. Cudjoe locates BTC in the same momentum of community education-oriented projects in Toronto, including the Black Education Project (which prepared Black youth for higher education) and Kay Livingstone's Congress of Black Women.

Under Cudjoe's leadership, BTC went onto produce numerous well-received and well-attended works, including the first Canadian production of A Raisin in the Sun (1978) and the Dora Mavor Moore Award-winning A Caribbean Midsummer Night's Dream (1983). Leon Bibb's One More Stop on the Freedom Train (1984), a musical about the Underground Railroad in Ontario, toured Ontario in 1985 and played in the Canadian Pavilion at Vancouver's Expo 86 as part of the Arts Against Apartheid Festival which featured Archbishop Desmond Tutu and Harry Belafonte.

BTC also placed heavy emphasis on community and youth education. In addition to performance training, BTC encouraged people to write plays, and held playwright competitions—one of which culminated in an umbrella group behind the Arts Against Apartheid Festival at Expo 86. Cudjoe's co-director Amah Harris toured schools with plays for young people based on the Anansi folktales. These plays were some of the first multi-racial, cross-cultural 'learning-plays' to enter the metro Toronto school system. Given their popularity, BTC was invited to participate in the 1979 Afro-American Ethnic Festival in Detroit where they played to an additional 35,000 children.

Nonetheless, BTC was consistently denied reliable funding and eventually folded in 1988. In regard to the funding issue, Cudjoe has expressed: "We were interested in going to schools, we were interested in getting the little children oriented to black history, and we had all these other, sort of... things to do. [The Council was] insensitive to that. They made us feel that we were too community-oriented."

=== Later years and death ===
Following the permanent suspension of Black Theatre Canada, Cudjoe appeared in a number of works, including E.N.G. (1989), Rookie Blue (2010), and Jumping the Broom (2011). She also spent two years in Ontario Theological Seminary.

For her contributions, Cudjoe received the Queen Elizabeth II Silver Jubilee Medal and the African-Canadian Achievement Award in Arts and Entertainment.

Cudjoe died on 22 July 2026.

== Legacy ==
Through Black Theatre Canada, Vera Cudjoe cultivated a deep legacy of artists, among them Delroy Lindo, Arlene Duncan, Leon Bibb, Jackie Richardson, Joe Sealy, Tom Butler, Philip Akin, Denis Simpson, Diana Braithwaite, and Jeff Jones. Critically acclaimed dub artist ahdri zhina mandiela has commented: (Note: The quote below preserves the intentional lack of capitalisation in ahdri zhina mandiela's works.)

myself, along with folks like djanet sears, luther hansraj, emerita emerencia, donald carr & others participated in btc as an informal ensemble for a few seasons. we worked with & under the tutelage of amah harris/co-artistic director with vera cudjoe. our work centered around harris’ anansi stories as well as some general performance & other production training/mentoring, and artistic jamming. jamming my poetry in ensemble performance was my intro to the group. i later worked as stage manager, performer, and even admin/office assistant with btc from ’79 – ’82. black theatre canada folded in the late 80s . . . lack of funds & other support. unfortunate as it wd have been a real place of learning for many artists in the city, given that almost all black artists working between 1972 & 1985 passed thru their gates. any theatre or other live performance artists who started out in that day & are still working now have a btc story to tell.
