= Black Theatre Canada =

Toronto-based theatre company founded in 1973

- Formation: 1973
- Dissolved: 1988
- Type: Theatre group
- Location: Toronto, Ontario
- Artistic director: Vera Cudjoe
- Notable members: ahdri zhina mandiela, Amah Harris, Arlene Duncan, Delroy Lindo, Denis Simpson, Diana Braithwaite, Jackie Richardson, Jeff Jones, Joe Sealy, Leon Bibb, Philip Akin, Tom Butler, Jeff Jones

Black Theatre Canada (BTC) was a Toronto-based theatre company founded in 1973 by Vera Cudjoe. The company sought to give expression to Black performance culture in Canada and to develop talent from the Black community. BTC was known for its critically acclaimed adaptations and original productions as well as educational programming, some of which extended into the metro Toronto school system. BTC cultivated a deep legacy of Black theatre and live performance artists in the 1970s and 1980s before folding in 1988 due to chronic funding shortages.

== Early years ==
Black Theatre Canada was founded in 1973 in Toronto by Vera Cudjoe, who sought to give expression to Black performance culture in Canada and to train young talent from the Black community.

In establishing the company, Cudjoe received help from Ed Smith, who had founded the Buffalo Black Drama Workshop and taught African-American studies at the University at Buffalo. Smith and his group travelled to Toronto to stage a play by Ron Milner titled Who's Got His Own, in order to "see if Toronto is ready for Black professional theatre". The cohort at the Underground Railroad, a popular Black restaurant in Toronto, assisted with accommodation and venue. The work was presented for a single night at the First Unitarian Congregation of Toronto to a full audience. The enthusiastic response encouraged Cudjoe to pursue the theatre group.

A number of early collaborators helped set up the company's administration, among them June Faulkner, former general manager of Toronto Workshop Productions and Young People's Theatre. The first Board included novelist Austin Clarke, choreographer Len Gibson, and City Councillor Ying Hope. For a short while in its beginning years, BTC operated in conjunction with Theatre Fountainhead (founded by Jeff Henry in 1974) as "Black Theatre Alliance", largely to fend off an attempt by the Canada Council for the Arts to fold the companies together.

BTC's first full production was Roderick Walcott's Malfini (1974), the story of three superstitious men on trial in purgatory for the murder of a boy. The performances took place at Bathurst Street United Church, converted into a theatre with the help of Walcott and his technicians. The venue, now home to the Randolph Academy for the Performing Arts and the Bathurst Street Theatre, had never previously been used as a theatre.

== Productions ==
The company produced numerous well-received and well-attended works, including the first Canadian production of A Raisin in the Sun (1978) by Lorraine Hansberry and the Dora Mavor Moore Award-winning A Caribbean Midsummer Night's Dream (1983). Leon Bibb's One More Stop on the Freedom Train (1984), a musical about the Underground Railroad in Ontario, toured Ontario in 1985 and played in the Canadian Pavilion at Vancouver Expo 86 as part of the Arts Against Apartheid Festival, which featured Archbishop Desmond Tutu and Harry Belafonte.

=== Original works ===
Original plays developed and presented include:

- Layers by Vilbert Cambridge
- Changes by Peter Robinson
- Bathurst Street (collectively written)
- One More Stop on the Freedom Train by Leon Bibb; musical direction by Joe Sealy
- The African Roscius (Being the Life and Times of Ira Aldridge) by Robin Breon
- Under Exposure by Lisa Evans

== Educational programming ==
Cudjoe has identified BTC with the momentum of community education-oriented projects in Toronto, including the Black Education Project (which prepared Black youth for higher education) and Kay Livingstone's Congress of Black Women.

In addition to performance training, BTC encouraged people to write plays and held playwright competitions. One playwright competition in particular—"Act Against Apartheid"—produced one-act plays and led to the creation of an umbrella group behind the Arts Against Apartheid Festival at Vancouver Expo 86.

Amah Harris, who served as co-director of BTC in the 1970s, toured schools with plays for young people based on the Anansi folktales. These plays were some of the first multi-racial, cross-cultural "learning-plays" to enter the Metro Toronto school system. Their popularity was such that BTC was invited to participate in the 1979 Afro-American Ethnic Festival in Detroit, where they played to an additional 35,000 children.

== Closure ==
BTC was consistently denied reliable funding and folded in 1988. Lack of access to performance venues was also a frequent challenge, such that the award-winning A Caribbean Midsummer Night's Dream was produced in the auditorium of 999 Queen St W (former Centre for Addiction and Mental Health facility demolished in October 2008). In regard to the funding issue, Cudjoe has commented: "We were interested in going to schools, we were interested in getting the little children oriented to Black history, and we had all these other, sort of... things to do. [The Council was] insensitive to that. They made us feel that we were too community-oriented."

Arts journalist and collaborator Robin Breon has written:

It is further to the everlasting credit of B.T.C. that these theatre productions, school tours, educational materials, numerous workshops and classes were produced with the most minimal amount of government and private support. Indeed, the organization has always been precariously financed and chronically underfunded by government agencies. However, in spite of this handicap their contributions have been steady, on-going and professional in quality.

== Legacy ==
Black Theatre Canada provided an artistic venue to numerous Black theatre and live performance artists active in Toronto between 1972 and 1985. This legacy includes Delroy Lindo, Arlene Duncan, Leon Bibb, Jackie Richardson, ahdri zhina mandiela, Joe Sealy, Tom Butler, Philip Akin, Denis Simpson, Diana Braithwaite, and Jeff Jones.
