= RapCity =

Canadian television program

- The show's logo
- Country of origin: Canada

Production
- Production companies: CHUM Television (1989–2007); 299 Queen Street West

Original release
- Network: MuchMusic
- Release: 1989 – 2014

RapCity is a Canadian television program that formerly aired on the MuchMusic cable channel from September 1989 to 2014. It is not to be confused with the BET TV show of the same name, Rap City.

The show features a selection of the newest and vintage music videos from Canadian hip hop and US hip hop artists. RapCity began five years after MuchMusic first went on the air in 1984, and is still in existence. The program was created by director/producer Michele Geister after petitioning to Programme Director John Martin that a hip hop show was overdue for the Canadian market as well as the music channel's credibility. Music enthusiast, club DJ, Geister began her MuchMusic career as a master control operator then editor. Her efforts and abilities paid off with the launch of Soul in the City (Much's first specialty show) when asked by Michael Williams to help develop his concept- a weekly hour-long program focusing on Urban music---the first of its kind in Canada. The explosion of rap and hip hop videos being sent for SITC was calling for the addition of a show dedicated to the new genre. Soul in the City broadcast various rap features and specials in 1987 and 1988 before the new show was given permission to begin production in 1989 .

The show's original host was Michael Williams; later, the show was hosted by Oliver then Master T, and later Namugenyi Kiwanuka, who left MuchMusic in 2003. After that, occasionally, a hip hop artist would guest-host RapCity. The show was relaunched as a live, one-hour program on January 13, 2011 with a new host, Tyrone "T-RexXx" Edwards. Five-time freestyle champion Charron was the first ever retired Champion on RapCity in March 2011. As of August 2011, Jae Ari is the most recent retired Champion on RapCity who will be placed in a Winner's circle for future battles with other winners.

Originally, RapCity aired once a week then expanded to five half hours a week and eventually became a weekly show in Fall 2007, airing on Saturday nights at 11:00PM Eastern Time. The relaunched RapCity currently aired live on Thursdays at 10:00PM Eastern Time.

By the start of 2014, RapCity ended its run amidst staffing cuts and reduction of the music videos from its schedule. The series now appears on MuchMusic's TikTok official account.
