= Sugarfoot (disambiguation) =

Sugarfoot is a television Western.

Sugarfoot may also refer to:

== People with the nickname ==
- Ezzrett Anderson (1920–2017), Canadian football player
- Pete Cunningham (kickboxer) (born 1963), retired Canadian kickboxer, boxer, martial artist, actor and author
- Leroy "Sugarfoot" Bonner (1943–2013), guitarist for the Ohio Players
- Jonathan Moffett (born 1954), American drummer, songwriter and producer

== Arts, entertainment, and media ==
- Sugarfoot (film), a 1951 film starring Randolph Scott
