= Electric Circus =

Coordinates: 43.649701°N 79.390233°W

- Opening logo for Electric Circus
- Genre: Live Dance Music
- Presented by: Monika Deol; Michael Williams; Juliette Powell; Nadine Ramkisson; Rick Campanelli; Bradford How; Rainbow Sun Francks; Namugenyi Kiwanuka; Amanda Walsh
- Country of origin: Canada
- Original language: English
- No. of seasons: 15

Production
- Executive producer: Joel Goldberg
- Production locations: Toronto, Ontario, Canada
- Camera setup: Single camera Multi-camera (1996)
- Running time: 90 minutes (1988–2001); 60 minutes (2001–2003)

Original release
- Network: MuchMusic (1988–2003); Citytv (1988-2003)
- Release: September 16, 1988 – December 12, 2003

Electric Circus (also known as EC) is a Canadian live dance music television program that aired on MuchMusic and Citytv from September 16, 1988, to December 12, 2003. The name originated from a nightclub that once existed at Citytv's first studio at 99 Queen Street East in Toronto.

Beginning in 1994, the show was also simulcast on MuchUSA. It had a loyal following among United States viewers, especially dance music fans. A Francophone version of Electric Circus aired on Musique Plus, broadcasting live from Montreal in the same format as the Toronto version.

== History ==
The idea for Electric Circus came about in 1988 after City TV owner Moses Znaimer sought to create a live dance music show that would showcase the broadcaster's location at 299 Queen Street West. Previous popular dance shows, such as Soul Train and American Bandstand helped introduce music genres and different sounds to large audiences.

MuchMusic's director of programming John Martin, VJ Kim Clarke Champniss, and producer Joel Goldberg decided that the MuchMusic studio on the main floor of the CHUM-City Building in Toronto would be used to film the show, so that people on the street could watch from the windows.

The name "Electric Circus" was chosen due to it being the name of a former nightclub that had existed in the original home of City TV and MuchMusic during the 1960s. City TV entertainment reporter Monika Deol and MuchMusic VJ Michael Williams were the show's initial co-hosts. From 1996 to 2000, Juliette Powell was the host.

It originally aired Saturday afternoons for an hour and a half, and from 1988 to 1993, it was broadcast on City TV before transitioning to MuchMusic. In 1993, it moved to an evening slot, from 7:30-9:00 PM (ET).

Most music was prerecorded, but live acts were invited onto some shows, and in the 1990s guest D.J.s were also featured. The Dream Warriors, Michie Mee, and Maestro Fresh Wes all notably appeared on the show.

Producer Joel Goldberg took a minimalist approach to the set, using camera work from videographers (including George Lagogianes), talented dancers and live performances. As a result, Goldberg created a show that highlighted the music and the dancers while throwing cutaways to videos. Guest artists performed live (or live-to-track), none lip-synched. In 1992, producing duties were passed on to Sharon Kavanaugh. After Goldberg moved on, the set became more elaborate, the dancers' costuming became choreographed, the quality of the dancing declined, and most of the performances were lip-synced, with the exception of the DJs, who mixed the breaks as well as a short feature each episode.

Dancing alumni from the show also include former CFNY-FM Producer and DJ, Edd "The Wiz" Scorpio, radio DJ Ashley Greco of the Z103.5 Morning Show and boy band b4-4, comedians Marcus Brigstocke and Katherine Ryan. The WiZ created the first theme the show ever had, "The EC Rap".

In the summer of 1996, the show was revamped with a new multi-camera film open. The series' original theme music, an instrumental of Narada Michael Walden's 1988 single "Divine Emotions," was replaced by a new show theme, "Hang On Here We Go!" (Theme to E.C). A full-length version of the song was released under the name Jet Fuel and featured lead vocals by Aleah D'Kos and guest vocals by a gas mask-wearing (video) K-os.

Electric Circus did two concerts were hosted annually: one at Canada's Wonderland during the summer, and another at Winterlude in Ottawa during the winter.

The final show was on December 12, 2003.

MuchMusic aired an Electric Circus special on Christmas Day 2006 and featured an Electric Circus New Year's Eve special on December 31, 2011. In the days before the 2011 special it was advertised as the return of Electric Circus.

MuchMusic aired Electric Circus on October 27, 2012, for Halloween.

== Past hosts ==
- Monika Deol (1988–1996)
- Michael Williams
- George Lagogianes
- Juliette Powell (1996–2000)
- Nadine Ramkisson (2000–2002)
- Rick Campanelli (2002)
- Bradford How (2002)
- Rainbow Sun Francks (2002–2003)
- Namugenyi Kiwanuka (2002–2003)
- Amanda Walsh (2002–2003)
- Liz Trinnear (2012)
- Tyrone "T-RexXx" Edwards (2012)

== See also ==
- Club MTV
- The Grind
- Dance Party USA
- The Party Machine with Nia Peeples
- bpm:tv, the Canadian dance music video channel
