= List of skinhead books =

This is a list of notable books about, or related to, the Skinhead subculture.

== Non-fiction ==
- A Boy's Story : Martin King (ISBN 1-84018-333-0)
- A Propos du Phenomene des Skinheads et du Racisme en Suisse (ISBN 2-88224-047-3)
- American Skinheads - The Criminology and Control of Hate Crime : Mark S. Hamm (ISBN 0-275-94987-7)
- Back from the Brink: Rebellious Youth, Skinhead and Addict : Noel Davidson (ISBN 1-84030-091-4)
- Blood Crimes: The Pennsylvania Skinhead Murders : Fred Rosen (ISBN 0-7860-0314-6)
- Blood in the Face: The Ku Klux Klan, Aryan Nations, Nazi Skinheads, and the Rise of a New White Culture : James Ridgeway (ISBN 1-56025-100-X)
- Boss Sounds : Classic Skinhead Reggae : Marc Griffiths (ISBN 1-898927-20-0)
- Cream Of The Crops : Mark Brown (ISBN 84-605-6367-7)
- Football Hooliganism and the Skinheads : John Clarke (ISBN 0-7044-0489-3)
- Gewalt gegen Fremde: Rechtsradikale, Skinheads und Mitläufer : (ISBN 3-87966-348-3)
- Jugendliche Subkulturen - Hooligans und Skinheads: Entstehung, Verbreitung und gesellschaftliche Auswirkung am Beispiel der Fans der Böhsen Onkelz : Stefan Rapp (ISBN 3-639-14072-9)
- Les Skinheads et l'Extreme Droite : Daniel Hubert (ISBN 2-89005-439-X)
- Mordskameradschaft. cbt. Tim, unter Skinheads geraten : Carlo Ross (ISBN 3-570-30082-X)
- Neonazis en España: De las Audiciones Wagnerianas a los Skinheads (1966–1995) : Xavier Casals (ISBN 84-253-2804-7)
- No Retreat : Dave Hann and Steve Hilsey (ISBN 1-903854-22-9)
- Noheads : Auerbach (ISBN 3-931003-00-0)
- Oi for England : Trevor Griffiths (ISBN 0-571-11977-8)
- Oi! Stories : Kid Stoker (ISBN 978-90-75964-02-8)
- Punkare och Skinheads : Socialisering i Gäng : Julio Ferrer (ISBN 91-1-823401-1)
- Rechte Kerle: Skinheads, Faschos, Hooligans : Burkhard Schröder (ISBN 3-499-18271-8)
- Skins : Gavin Watson (ISBN 0-9539942-1-X)
- Skins and Punks : Lost Archives 1978–1985 : Gavin Watson (ISBN 0-9558015-2-4)
- Skinhead : Nick Knight (ISBN 0-7119-0052-3)
- Skinheads : C. Ryan (London, 1981)
- Skinheads a Catalunya (ISBN 84-664-0429-5)
- Skinheads: A Guide to an American Subculture : Tiffini Travis, Perry Hardy (ISBN 978-0-313-35953-8)
- Skinhead: A Way Of Life : Klaus Farin (ISBN 3-933773-05-9)
- Skinhead Confessions: From Hate to Hope : T. J. Leyden with Bridget M. Cook (ISBN 978-1-59955-133-3)
- Skinhead International: A Worldwide Survey of Neo-Nazi Skinheads : B'Nai B'Rith Anti-Defamation League (ISBN 0-88464-166-X)
- Skinhead Nation : George Marshall (ISBN 1-898927-45-6)
- Skinheads : Eberhard Seidel-Peilen and Klaus Farin (ISBN 3-406-47583-3)
- Skinheads and the Study of Youth Culture : John Clarke (ISBN 0-7044-0472-9)
- Skinheads : Ästhetik und Gewalt : Susanne El-Nawab (ISBN 3-86099-209-0)
- Skinheads Gothics Rockabillies : Gewalt, Tod & Rock 'n' Roll : Susanne El-Nawab (ISBN 3-940213-39-X)
- Skinheads. Portrait einer Subkultur : Christian Menhorn (ISBN 3-7890-7563-9)
- Skinheads In Deutschland : M. Eberwein and J. Drexler (ISBN 3-926794-26-7)
- Skinheads, Rastas and Hippies : John Williams (ISBN 1-84747-004-1)
- Skinheads : Roman : Roger Martin (ISBN 2-7021-1713-9)
- Skinheads Shaved for Battle : A Cultural History of American Skinheads : Jack B. Moore (ISBN 0-87972-583-4)
- Skinhead Street Gangs : Loren Christensen (ISBN 0-87364-756-4)
- Skinheads und die Gesellschaftliche Rechte : Frank Lauenburg (ISBN 978-3-8288-9080-0)
- Skinstreet - The Skinhead Way of Life : Angelo Sindaco (ISBN 88-88493-35-2)
- Spirit of '69 - A Skinhead Bible : George Marshall (ISBN 1-898927-10-3)
- Stiefel, Bomberjacke, jede Menge Zoff: ein Skin steigt aus : Michael ackermann (ISBN 3-417-20864-5)
- Surfers, Soulies, Skinheads and Skaters: Subcultural Style from the Forties to the Nineties : Claudia Schnurmann, Cathie Dingwall and Daniel F. McGrath (ISBN 1-85177-175-1)
- Swansea Jacks : From Skinheads to Stone Island - Forty Years of One of Britain's Most Notorious Hooligan Gangs : Andrew Tooze and Martin King (ISBN 1-906085-05-6)
- The Lads in Action : Ethnicity, Identity and Social Process Amongst Australian Skinheads : David Moore (ISBN 1-85742-203-1)
- The Paint House : Words from an East End Gang : S. Daniel, P. Doyle and P. McGuire (ISBN 0-14-080359-9)
- The Story of Oi: A View from the Dead End of the Street : Garry Johnson (ISBN 1-904432-39-5)
- The Way We Wore : A Life In Threads : Robert Elms (ISBN 0-330-42032-1)
- Skinhead: Lo stile della strada : Riccardo Pedrini (ISBN 88-86232-92-6)
- Ultras y Skinheads : La Juventud Visible : Imagenes, Estilos y Conflictos de Las Subculturas Juveniles En Espana : Teresa Adan Revilla (ISBN 84-87531-62-8)
- Unter Glatzen. Meine Begegnungen mit Skinheads : Christiane Tramitz (ISBN 3-426-27242-3)
- Von Skinheads keine Spur : Lutz von Dijk (ISBN 3-570-30537-6)
- Want Some Aggro? : Cass Pennant and Micky Smith (ISBN 1-84454-403-6)
- White Noise: Inside the International Nazi Skinhead Scene : Nick Lowles (ISBN 0-9522038-3-9)
- Evil Russia: Radical Russian Youth : Danil Pistoletov (ISBN 978-5-0064-9526-5)

== Fiction ==
- American Skin : Don De Grazia (ISBN 0-684-86222-0)
- Booted and Suited : Chris Brown (ISBN 1-84454-746-9)
- Blind : K. Rodriguez (ISBN 978-1-4116-1271-6)
- Cherry Docs : David Gow (ISBN 1-896239-37-4)
- Children of the Sun : Max Schaefer (ISBN 978-1-59376-297-1)
- Code of the Roadies : Ted Ottley (ISBN 0-553-56757-8)
- Come Before Christ and Murder Love : Stewart Home (ISBN 978-1-85242-575-3)
- Dragon Skins : Richard Allen (ISBN 0-450-02448-2)
- England Belongs to Me : Steve Goodman (ISBN 978-1-898928-00-3)
- Gay Skins: Class, Masculinity and Queer Appropriation : Murray Healy (ISBN 0-304-33323-9)
- Jackpot: The Dread Skinhead : Jabari Adisa (ISBN 979-8-9927648-3-3)
- Moonstomp! Volume One: Nite Klub : Natassja Noctis (ISBN 978-1-4357-2861-5)
- Moonstomp : Tim Wells (ISBN 978-1-78965-045-7)
- Raiders Of The Lost Forehead : Stanley Manly (ISBN 1-84068-031-8)
- Ratz are Nice : Lawrence Ytzhak Braithwaite (ISBN 1-55583-554-6)
- Red London : Stewart Home (ISBN 1-873176-12-0)
- Shine On Me : Tim Wells (ISBN 978-1-80018-156-4)
- Skavoovee : Ska Child and David Harris (ISBN 1-55212-932-2)
- Skin : Peter Milligan (comic book, ISBN 91-7089-042-0)
- Skinhead : Jay Bennett (ISBN 0-449-70397-5)
- Skinheads : John King (ISBN 0-09-945887-X)
- Skinhead: Simon Wellington - 2020 - (ISBN 978-0648761112)
- Skinheads, Taggers, Zulus & Co. : Patrick Louis (ISBN 2-7103-0444-9)
- Slow Death : Stewart Home (ISBN 1-85242-519-9)
- The Complete Richard Allen Volume 1 (Skinhead, Suedehead, Skinhead Escapes) : Richard Allen (ISBN 0-9518497-1-9)
- The Complete Richard Allen Volume 2 (Skinhead Girls, Sorts, Knuckle Girls) : Richard Allen (ISBN 0-9518497-5-1)
- The Complete Richard Allen Volume 3 (Trouble for Skinhead, Skinhead Farewell, Top Gear Skin) : Richard Allen (ISBN 0-9518497-7-8)
- Skinhead Away : Marcus Blakeston (ISBN 978-1-4776-7025-5)
