= Jumping the Broom =

- Theatrical release poster
- Directed by: Salim Akil
- Screenplay by: Elizabeth Hunter; Arlene Gibbs
- Story by: Elizabeth Hunter
- Produced by: Tracey E. Edmonds; Elizabeth Hunter; T. D. Jakes; Glendon Palmer; Curtis Wallace
- Starring: Angela Bassett; Paula Patton; Laz Alonso; Loretta Devine; Mike Epps; Meagan Good; Tasha Smith; Julie Bowen; Romeo Miller; DeRay Davis; Valarie Pettiford
- Cinematography: Anastas N. Michos
- Edited by: Terilyn A. Shropshire
- Music by: Edward Shearmur
- Production companies: TriStar Pictures; Stage 6 Films; Our Stories Films
- Distributed by: Sony Pictures Releasing
- Release date: May 6, 2011
- Running time: 112 minutes
- Country: United States
- Language: English
- Budget: $6.6 million
- Box office: $37.7 million

Jumping the Broom is a 2011 American romantic comedy-drama film directed by Salim Akil and produced by Tracey E. Edmonds, Elizabeth Hunter, T. D. Jakes, Glendon Palmer, and Curtis Wallace.

The title of the film is derived from the sometimes Black American tradition of bride and groom jumping over a ceremonial broom after being married. As historian Tyler D. Parry notes in Jumping the Broom: The Surprising Multicultural Origins of a Black Wedding Ritual, the film uses the broomstick wedding to explore the intersections of class, race, and culture in the United States, alongside the different conceptions that African Americans hold regarding the custom's relevance for Black matrimony in the 21st century.

The film was shot in Blue Rocks, Nova Scotia, Canada, standing in for Martha's Vineyard in Massachusetts, the setting for the film. TriStar Pictures distributed the film in the United States on May 6, 2011. The film received mixed reviews with critics positively noting its cultural themes and well-selected cast, but criticized its tone, characterization, predictability, and screenplay.

== Plot ==
Sabrina Watson is the only child of the affluent Watsons, Claudine and Greg, who live on Martha's Vineyard. Catching Bobby on the phone with another woman, she asks God to help her get out of this situation, (again) promising not to have another one-night stand but only be intimate with her future husband. One day, she accidentally hits Jason Taylor while driving. Getting out to offer help, she overreacts, he forgives her and takes her to dinner.

After five months of dating, Sabrina tells Jason about her new job in China, asking him to maintain a long-distance relationship with her. He declines, so she walks off sadly. Soon she hears a music group singing, and Jason proposes, which she accepts.

Sabrina's mother, who is organizing the wedding, has her doubts but trusts her daughter's judgment. After the couple talk to Reverend James, they decide to stay while a driver picks up Jason's family and friends. This group includes his insecure mother Pam, his charming uncle Willie Earl, Pam's best friend Shonda and Jason's cousin Malcolm. Also appearing is Sabrina's aunt Geneva.

The first meeting is awkward as everyone seems to dislike each other, making small rude remarks. Pam becomes annoyed by Sabrina's acts of kindness and soon counts three strikes against her. Sabrina talks to her friends during the cocktail party, one of them being her maid of honor Blythe. While Blythe goes to get more wine, she meets Chef McKenna, and both instantly feel a connection.

Shonda meets Sabrina's cousin Sebastian, with whom they also have instant chemistry, but their great age difference makes her uncomfortable. During the evening dinner, Pam gives a rude blessing and fights with Claudine but is stopped by Greg. Claudine also says in French that she thinks Greg is having an affair with his associate Amanda. While outside, Pam overhears Geneva and Claudine fighting, finding out that Geneva is actually Sabrina's mother who gave Sabrina to Claudine and Greg to raise, as she was a teen.

At the bachelor party, Sabrina and Jason fight about his mother wanting them to jump the broom. Malcolm complains to Jason about not being the best man, who reminds him they have not been best friends for years as Malcolm only appears when he needs money. When Jason leaves and tries to apologize to Sabrina, Chef McKenna is busy kissing Blythe, who fails to notice the food burning, which sets off the alarm. Sabrina closes the door on Jason, but they make up through text.

In the morning, everything begins normally. The boys have a friendly game of football, although Pam tries to tell Jason Claudine and Geneva's secret. Blythe also talks to McKenna about the relationship, who tells her she is beautiful and that it is still an option. Greg reveals to Claudine that he is not having an affair, but rather has made some bad investments, leaving them broke.

While Pam is getting fitted in her dress, she tries to reveal the secret to Sabrina, but is interrupted when Jason gets hurt when pushed by Malcolm. She suggests Sabrina ask her parents who her real parents are, so Claudine and Geneva tell the truth. Hurt, Sabrina drives off and cancels the wedding. Jason confronts his mother, telling her to stop treating him like a child. He asks everyone to look for Sabrina and also punches Malcolm for saying “Now no one can be the best man now”. Jason prays to God to help him.

Geneva is called to a boat at the docks by Sabrina. She explains she met and fell in love with Sabrina's father in Paris. They planned to travel the world, but Geneva soon discovered he had a wife and child, so she returned home alone and pregnant. Jason meets with Sabrina and they reconcile. When she goes home to dress, she finds the broom with a note from Pam, saying she is leaving home and apologizing. Sabrina chases her down, they forgive each other and Pam agrees to stay.

Jason and Sabrina have the wedding and also jump the broom. Afterwards, Sebastian kisses Shonda, finally winning her affections, and presumably begins a relationship. Greg and Claudine reconcile and she reveals she has secret funds. Malcolm and Amy, the wedding planner, share a moment together and dance. At the end, the whole family happily does the Cupid Shuffle.

== Cast ==
- Paula Patton as Sabrina Watson
- Laz Alonso as Jason Taylor
- Angela Bassett as Claudine Watson
- Loretta Devine as Pam Taylor
- Valarie Pettiford as Aunt Geneva
- Mike Epps as Willie Earl Taylor
- Brian Stokes Mitchell as Greg Watson
- Meagan Good as Blythe
- Tasha Smith as Shonda Peterkin
- DeRay Davis as Malcolm
- Romeo Miller as Sebastian
- Pooch Hall as Ricky
- Gary Dourdan as Chef McKenna
- Julie Bowen as Amy
- Vera Cudjoe as Mabel
- Tenika Davis as Lauren
- T. D. Jakes as Reverend James
- El DeBarge as Singer
- Laura Kohoot as Amanda

== Critical reception ==
Jumping the Broom received mixed reviews from critics. Review aggregator Rotten Tomatoes gives the film an approval rating of 56%, based on 82 reviews, with an average rating of 6.07/10. The site's critical consensus reads, "Its heart is in the right place – and so is its appealing cast – but Jumping the Broom is ultimately too cliched and thinly written to recommend". On Metacritic the film has a score of 56 out of 100 based on 26 reviews, indicating "mixed or average" reviews.

Positive reviews include Kevin Thomas of The Los Angeles Times who said that the film "...is proof that it is still possible for a major studio release to be fun, smart and heart-tugging and devoid of numbskull violence and equally numbing special effects." Roger Ebert of The Chicago Sun-Times said that, "...the cast is large, well chosen and diverting."

Negative reviews include Stephanie Merry of The Washington Post who criticized the characters of the mothers saying, "Any light moments are quickly nullified by the oppressive women vying for the title of world’s meanest mom." John Anderson of Variety also commented on the film's "nasty tone".

== Awards and nominations ==
- Black Reel Awards
  - Best Picture, nominated
  - Best Actor (Laz Alonso), nominated
  - Best Supporting Actress (Angela Bassett), nominated
  - Best Ensemble, nominated
  - Best Director (Salim Akil), nominated
  - Best Screenaplay (Elizabeth Hunter & Arlene Gibbs), nominated
- NAACP Image Awards
  - Outstanding Motion Picture, nominated
  - Outstanding Actor in a Motion Picture (Laz Alonso), Won
  - Outstanding Actress in a Motion Picture (Paula Patton), nominated
  - Outstanding Supporting Actor in a Motion Picture (Mike Epps), Won
- BET Awards
  - Best Movie, nominated

== Home media ==
It was released on DVD and Blu-ray on August 9, 2011.

== See also ==
- List of black films of the 2010s
