= Lawrence Ytzhak Braithwaite =

Canadian writer (1963–2008)

Lawrence Christopher Patrick (aka Ytzhak) Braithwaite
- Born: March 17, 1963; Montreal, Quebec, Canada
- Died: July 14, 2008 (aged 45)

Lawrence Christopher Patrick (aka Ytzhak) Braithwaite (March 17, 1963 – July 14, 2008) was a Canadian novelist, spoken-word artist, dub poet, essayist, digital drummer and short fiction writer.

Born in Montreal, Quebec, he has been called "one of the outstanding Canadian prose writers alive" (Gail Scott) and linked to the "New Narrative" movement, a term coined by Steve Abbott. He was the author of the legendary cult novel Wigger.

Braithwaite's work has been praised by Dodie Bellamy for its "sublime impenetrability". and is fueled by a modernist and Fredric Jameson-influenced late modernist approach to writing and recording. His work is influenced by the musical and social realism of punk rock, opera, musique concrète, noise, hip hop, rap, industrial, black metal, country music and dub.

Braithwaite utilized the intensity of the New York City No Wave scene and the Los Angeles and Montreal hardcore punk music subcultures to compose his narrative. His family has laid him to rest in Notre-Dames-des-Neiges Cemetery, Montreal, Quebec.

Braithwaite was openly gay. He was a vocal critic of the LGBT community's sometimes inadequate response to issues of racism.

== Bibliography ==
- Wigger (1995) ISBN 1-55152-020-6
- Ratz Are Nice: PSP (2000) ISBN 1-55583-554-6
- Speed, thrash, death: Alamo, B. C. (with illustrations by Krista E. McLean & Max)
- More at 7:30 (Notes from New Palestine)

=== Anthologies ===
- Queeries: An Anthology of Gay Male Prose (ed. Dennis Denisoff, 1994): "Spunk"
- Role Call: A Generational Anthology of Social & Political Black Literature & Art
- Dodie Bellamy and Kevin Killian's Mirage #4/Period(ical)
- Bluesprints: Anthology of Black British Columbian Literature and Orature *Redzone zine,
- Of the Flesh: Dangerous Fiction
- "Vanilla Primitive". in the e-journal Sleepy Brain
- Nocturnes 3 Review of the Literary Arts 2005
- Biting the Error: Writers Explore Narrative
- Sidebrow e-journal.
- New Standards: The First Decade of Fiction at Fourteen Hills.
- The World Crisis Web (ed. Danny Dayus) Revolution is Bloody
- Black Ice.
- The Rain Review of Books

== Recordings ==
- Logopolis with The Killing Flaw
- Good Violence. D.U.N.
- How fast Does Light travel (for George Scott 3rd, James Chance and Lil G).
- Olivet (H.A.T.s in the Square) (featuring Intifada Al Ard).
- Unnerstated (Downpressin) from Hurricane Angel "Luckily I Was Half Cat"
- En Fins (Clichy Sous Bois) with Tolan McNeil (AKA The Giver).
- London bomb sensation (hoffman sub dub the samo samo) lord patch vs david patrick
- Unnerstated (a cappella) in Sean Lennon's Upstart Radio in Mindwalk 31: Driving to Baghdad
- En Fins (Clichy Sous Bois) in Mindwalk 42: Henry, Ann Coulter & the FCC.
- Just A Sect For Whiteboys In Afrika

== See also ==
- List of black Canadians
- List of skinhead books
