= Monika Deol =

Canadian television personality

Monika Deol is an Indian Canadian television personality. She began as an entertainment reporter for Citytv in Toronto, Ontario, and then became an anchor for MuchMusic's national news shows FAX and RapidFAX. From 1988 to 1996 Deol was simultaneously entertainment anchor on CityPulse at Six, co-host of MuchMusic's FAX and RapidFAX, and co-host of Citytv's alternative fashion and style show Ooh La La while hosting and co-producing MuchMusic's Electric Circus. Deol was the first news anchor with the inaugural VTV Vancouver News at 6 (now known as CTV Vancouver) and anchor on CityPulse News at 11 on Citytv Vancouver in 2002.

Deol starred in the 2015 Canadian feature film, Beeba Boys, directed by Deepa Mehta. She also appeared in John Candy's directorial debut, Hostage for a Day and had a principal role in the film, Just For Fun.

Deol is a contributing author to the anthology, Between Interruptions: 30 Women Tell The Truth About Motherhood. She was also founder and president of the cosmetics brand STELLAR, which launched in Sephora America in March, 2017.

In 2019, Deol was one of the recipients of the Top 25 Canadian Immigrant Awards.

== Personal life ==
Born in Punjab, India, Deol immigrated to Marathon, Ontario as a child with her parents, who were both teachers. Their family then moved to a grain and dairy farm in Beausejour, Manitoba. She attended the University of Winnipeg in the early 1980s and began her music career as a club DJ and VJ in the Fort Garry Hotel night club at that time. Deol then became the lead singer and manager of local Winnipeg band, "Perfect Kiss". Later, she moved to Toronto and joined CITY TV and MuchMusic as an on-air personality. She hosted the dance show Electric Circus for many years. Deol and her husband live in Vancouver with their four children.
