= The Dawn of Tomorrow =

Black Canadian Newspaper

- Type: Occasional Newspaper
- Founder(s): James Jenkins
- Founded: 1923
- Ceased publication: 2013
- City: London, Ontario
- Free online archives: www.blackpress.huronresearch.ca/6-the-dawn-of-tomorrow/

The Dawn of Tomorrow was a Black Canadian newspaper first published in 1923 by James Jenkins in London, Ontario. The paper circulated across Canada from 1923-2013 with a maximum readership of 4000-5000. The paper's motto was, "Devoted to the interests of the darker race."

After James Jenkins's death in 1931, leadership of the paper was taken over by his widow, Christine Jenkins. Christine continued publications of the paper until her death in 1967, after which her children Fred and David Jenkins continued publications until 2013.

James and Christine Jenkins were the parents of broadcaster and activist Kay Livingstone. Through her subsequent remarriage to Frank Howson, Christine Jenkins was the mother of Canadian Olympic athlete Barry Howson.

== Content ==
=== Religion and Spirituality ===
Religion was an integral part of The Dawn of Tomorrow. The paper regularly reported on the Sunday services of the British Methodist Episcopal (BME) church in London. Despite this, Jenkins used The Dawn to criticize the BME church, asserting that it was not doing enough to encourage Black collectivity and thriving in Canada. In addition to his criticisms, James Jenkins used The Dawn to express his rhetoric advocating for unity between the British Methodist Episcopal Church and the African Methodist Episcopal Church. The inclusion of advocacy for unity between churches is believed to also express James Jenkins' wider mission in pushing for collective unity among Black communities across Canada.

=== The Canadian League for the Advancement of Colored People ===
In 1924, Jenkins founded the "Canadian League for the Advancement of Colored People," (CLACP) which used The Dawn as its primary means of advertisement and organization. The CLACP, meant to serve as a Canadian equivalent to the NAACP, had branches in London, Windsor, Dresden, and Toronto, and acted as a social-welfare organization. While the CLACP never reached national status, it locally assisted Black Canadians with job placements, professional opportunities, youth education, and provided services and goods to those in need.

=== Black Canadian Community ===
==== Local Black News ====
The Dawn was dedicated to documenting local news pertaining to Black Canadians like the first Black Boy Scout troop of Canada. It also paid significant attention to Black achievements in music, theatre, sports, and education in Canada.

==== National Black News ====
The Dawn reported on transnational movements, like Garveyism, UNIA in Canada, and the opening of the NCC in Montreal, as well as Black Canadian wartime effort during WWII.

== Legacy ==
Scholarship recognizing the significance of The Dawn of Tomorrow has set it aside from Black Canadian Newspapers which predate The Dawn's initial publication, due to its attention to Black community, life, and culture. The Dawn of Tomorrow currently holds a legacy as a newspaper that provided equal attention to both social issues and movements, as well as Black Canadian cultures, community, and leisure. Holding space for both of these subjects has also identified The Dawn as a "first" in early Black Canadian history, gaining it the status of being the first early Black Canadian newspaper to feature fused content of this nature.
