= Alcenya Crowley =

Canadian educator & advocate (1926–2010)

- Born: Alcenya McElwain; April 26, 1926; St. Paul, Minnesota, United States
- Died: September 12, 2010; Mississauga, Ontario, Canada
- Other name: Alcenya Crowley-Morrow
- Occupations: Educator; Activist

Alcenya Crowley (April 3, 1926 – September 12, 2010), born Alcenya McElwain, was an American-born Canadian educator and activist.

== Early life and education ==
Alcenya McElwain was born in St. Paul, Minnesota, the daughter of William McElwain. She was educated at the Minneapolis School of Business. She later studied marketing at Ryerson Polytechnical Institute and earned a degree in political science from York University.

== Career ==
Crowley worked in a law office, in an accountant's office, at the Metropolitan Children's Aid Society, and then as a secretary for the Canadian Broadcasting Corporation. She later taught business for the Toronto District School Board, retiring in 1991.

Crowley joined the Canadian Negro Women's Association (CANEWA), later the Congress of Black Women of Canada. She served as vice-president from 1957 to 1958 and as president from 1959 to 1960. She chaired CANEWA's first Calypso Carnival, drawing on the cultures of the organization's Caribbean-born members. She represented CANEWA at the funeral of Martin Luther King Jr.

== Personal life ==
She married a Canadian podiatrist, William Richard "Buddy" Crowley, in 1951, and moved to Toronto with him.

Crowley was widowed when her husband died in 1963; she died in Credit Valley Hospital in 2010, at the age of 84.
