= James Francis Jenkins =

Canadian journalist

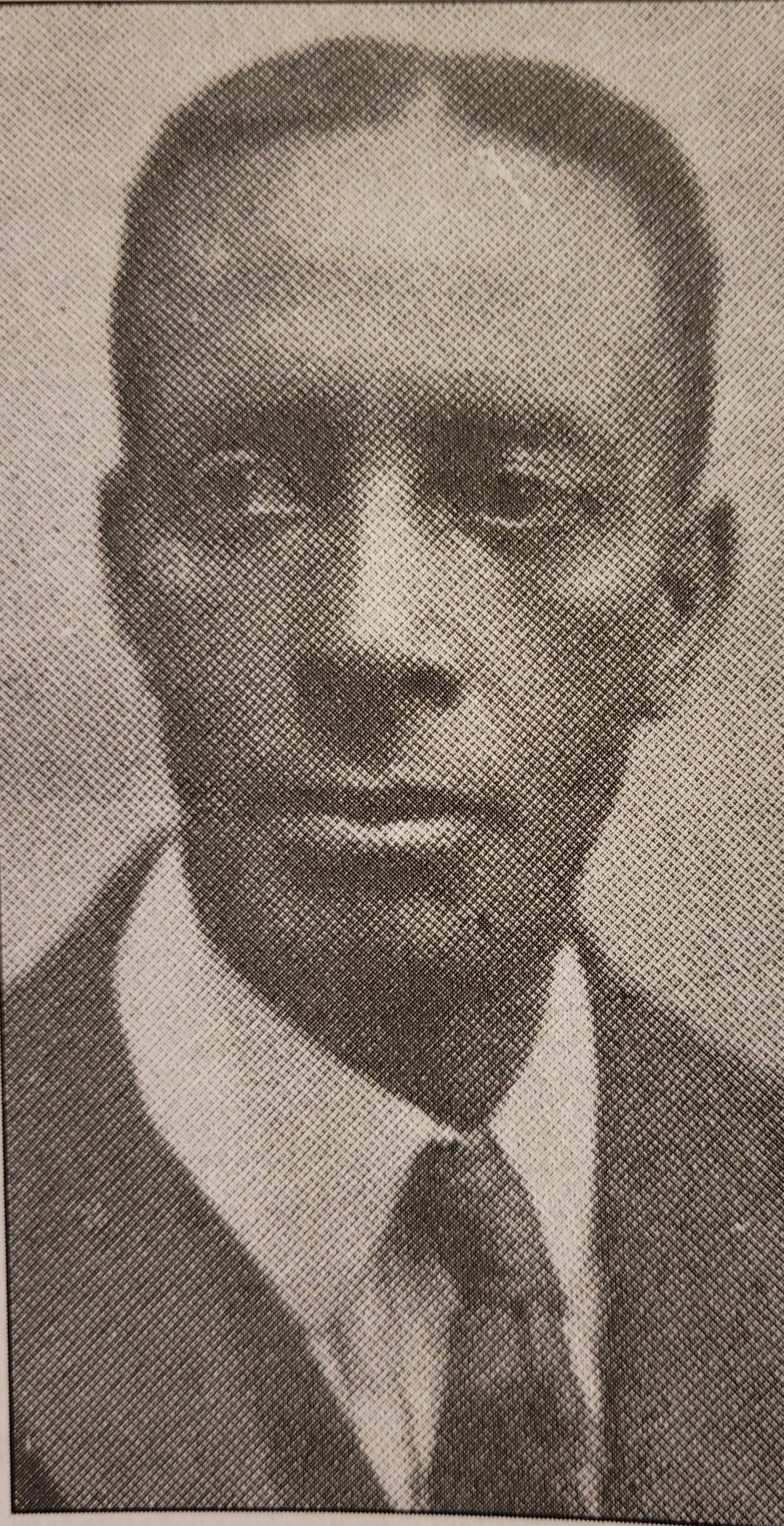
- Born: c. 1875; Forsyth, Georgia
- Died: May 6, 1931; London, Ontario
- Education: Clark Atlanta University (BA)

James Francis Jenkins (c. 1875 – May 6, 1931) was an American-born Canadian journalist and social activist.

== Early life and education ==
Born in Forsyth, Georgia, Jenkins grew up in a segregated society. His father operated a grocery store, and his mother ensured her children received an education.

Jenkins attended Clark Atlanta University, earning a BA in 1905. Influenced by civil rights activist W. E. B. Du Bois, Jenkins contributed articles to Du Bois's publication, Moon Illustrated Weekly, advocating for civil rights.

== Career ==
Jenkins relocated to London, Ontario in 1913. Initially employed as a labourer, he became active in journalism and social advocacy. On July 14, 1923, he founded and edited the Dawn of Tomorrow newspaper, which addressed racial issues and promoted racial integration in Canada. The newspaper, published weekly and later bi-monthly, reached a peak circulation of approximately 5,000 readers nationwide. Jenkins promoted racial unity and criticized systemic racism, occasionally causing controversy among local Black Canadian community leaders and church officials.

In 1924, Jenkins co-founded the Canadian League for the Advancement of Colored People (CLACP), receiving its federal charter in 1925. The league focused on social welfare, employment opportunities, and educational support for Black Canadians.

From 1925, Jenkins assisted in juvenile court cases involving Black youth.

== Personal life ==
Jenkins was married to Eliza Christina Groat. He died of heart failure in London, Ontario, on May 6, 1931, and was buried in Mount Pleasant Cemetery. Jenkins's widow and family continued publishing the Dawn intermittently until 1953, with occasional issues produced into the early 21st century.

== Recognition ==
In 2009, the London Public Library and community historians unveiled an Ontario Heritage Trust plaque at his former home. In 2023, University of Western Ontario launched an annual James Jenkins Black Scholarship to support Black students and publicly celebrated his contribution alongside other Black community builders.
