= Chuck Anderson (Canadian football) =

American gridiron football player (1917–1975)

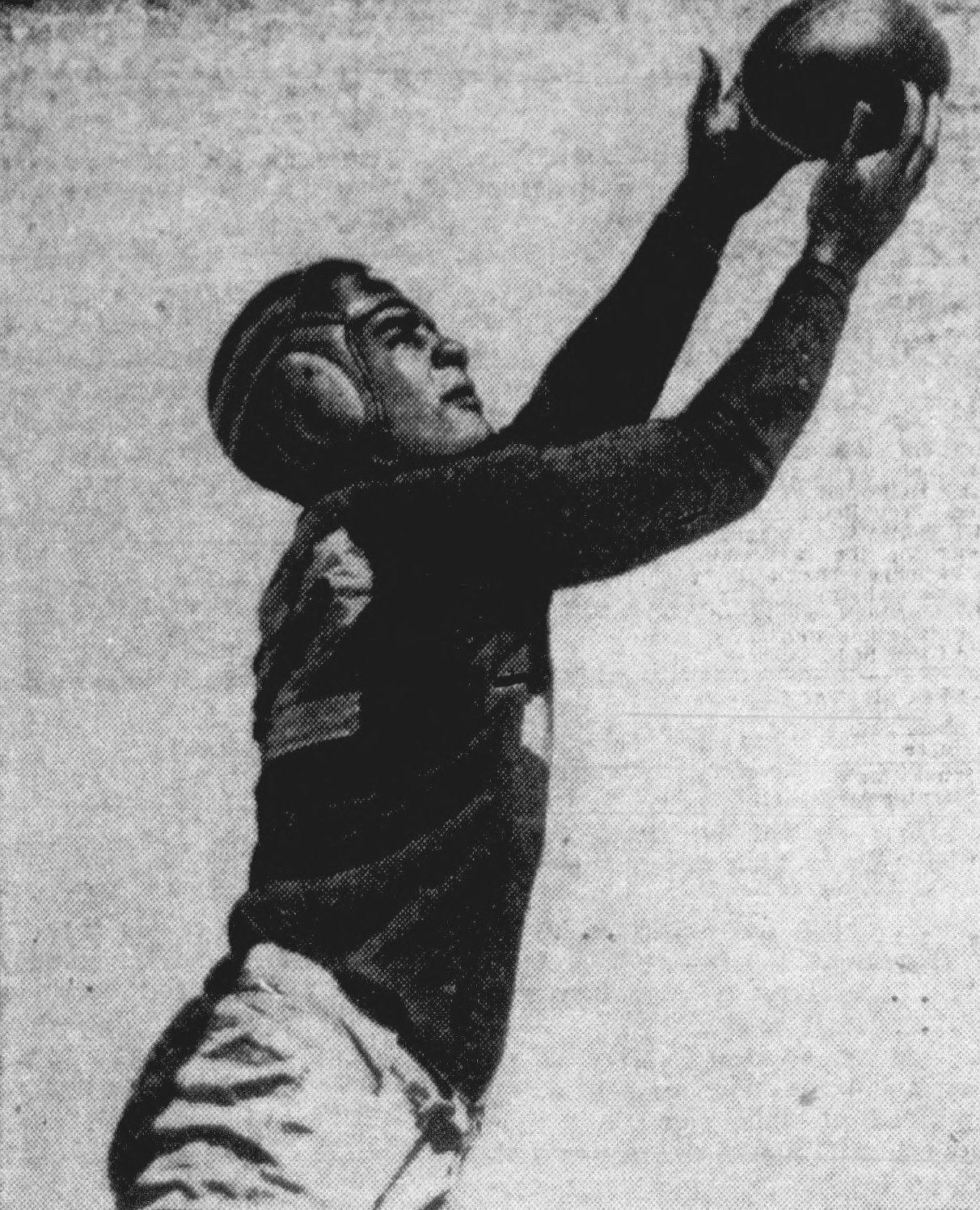
- Anderson, circa 1946

Profile
- Positions: Guard, centre, end

Personal information
- Born: September 29, 1917; Ramer, Alabama, U.S.
- Died: February 13, 1975 (aged 57); Louisville, Ohio, U.S.

Career information
- College: Ohio State

Career history
- 1948: Calgary Stampeders
- 1949–1950, 1952: Montreal Alouettes
- 1953: Ottawa Rough Riders

Awards and highlights
- 2× Grey Cup champion (1948, 1949); West All-Star (1948)

Charles Clay Anderson (September 29, 1917 – February 13, 1975) was an all-star and Grey Cup-champion professional Canadian football player.

== Biography ==
Anderson graduated from Ohio State and turned pro in 1945 and 1946 with the Hollywood Bears in the Pacific Coast Football League (PCFL) (along with Ezzert Anderson, who would also later play pro in Canada.) After playing with the Los Angeles Bulldogs of the PCFL (in 1947) he took his multi-talented skills (he could play any position on the offensive line) to Canada, where he won a Grey Cup in 1948 with the undefeated Calgary Stampeders. In a twist of fate, he joined the Montreal Alouettes the next season and defeated his former (championship) team to win another Grey Cup. He played with the Larks for three seasons (missing 1951 after a tryout with the Hamilton Tiger-Cats) and finished his career with the Ottawa Rough Riders in 1953.

Following the path blazed by Herb Trawick, the first professional African-American player in the Canadian leagues, Anderson was among the first to break the colour barrier. He died after an illness of two and a half years in a hospital in Louisville, Ohio, on February 13, 1975.
