= Juliette Powell =

American-Canadian author and beauty pageant titleholder (1970–2025)

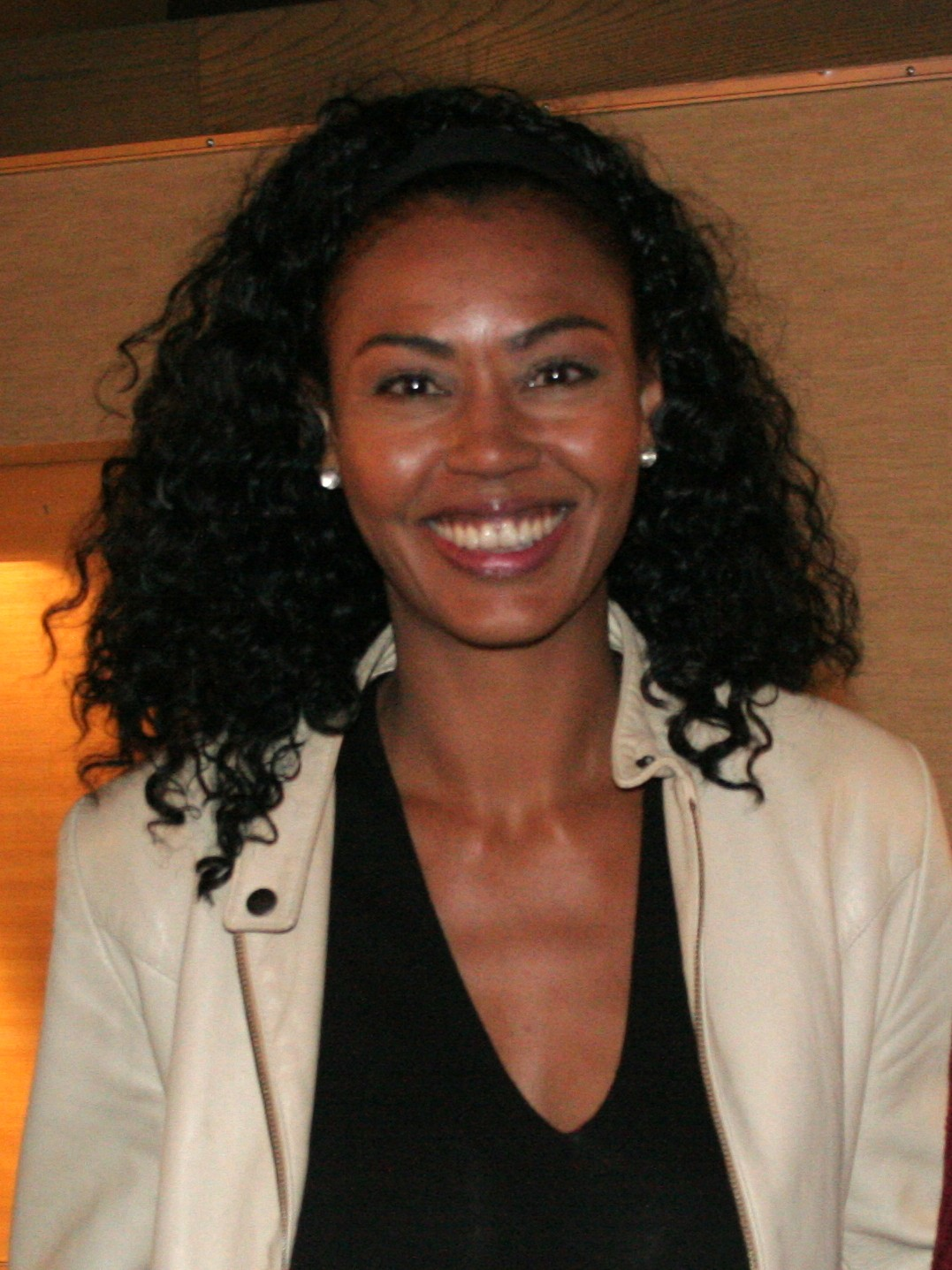
- Powell in 2010
- Born: June 22, 1970; New York City, U.S.
- Died: June 3, 2025 (aged 54); New York City, U.S.
- Education: Vanier College; McGill University; University of Toronto; Columbia University
- Occupations: VJ; business advisor; tech ethicist; author
- Beauty pageant titleholder
- Title: Miss Canada 1989
- Website: www.juliettepowell.com

Juliette Powell (June 22, 1970 – June 3, 2025) was an American-Canadian media expert, tech ethicist, business advisor, author and beauty pageant titleholder who was crowned Miss Canada 1989, the contest's first Black Canadian winner.

== Early life ==
Powell was born in Manhattan, New York, on June 22, 1970, and moved to Montreal, Quebec, with her French-Canadian mother at the age of eight. In high school, she excelled in math and science courses and swam twice a week, and stated she saw herself as a shy and unpopular student.

Her time in the world of beauty pageants began with her outrage when she heard a rumour that the second place winner of the Miss Montreal pageant had scored higher than the first-place winner, but the judges had not accepted her as the winner because she was black. She stated that she did not want to be a beauty queen but wanted to prove a point when she entered the Miss Montreal pageant herself, later entering and ultimately winning the 1989 Miss Canada Pageant. During this time, she also studied Commerce at Vanier College, graduating in 1992.

== Career ==
After her reign as Miss Canada, including representing the country at Miss Universe 1989, Powell joined MusiquePlus in 1992 as a VJ, while also studying finance and business at McGill University. She was host of MusiquePlus' weekly dance music show, Bouge de là! until 1996. That same year, she moved to Toronto, transferring to MuchMusic and becoming host of Electric Circus and French Kiss, while also studying economics at the University of Toronto.

In 1999, Powell began working for CablePulse 24 as a business reporter and founded media and consulting company Powell International Entertainment Inc. (PIE Inc.) which produced features with personalities such as Nelson Mandela, Rubin 'Hurricane' Carter, Sir Richard Branson, Tim Burton, Steven Spielberg, Tom Cruise, Janet Jackson, Tina Turner, and Prince Charles.

In 2001, she co-authored the media section for the UN Plan of Action of the World Conference against Racism. This began an ongoing advisory role with international institutions that grew to include the United Nations, World Economic Forum, and the World Bank, among others. In 2011, she began working with the E-G8, an extension of the G8 Summit, created to inform G8 leaders on the future of the internet and connected society.

Powell's book 33 Million People in the Room: How to Create, Influence and Run a Successful Business using Social Networking (Financial Times Press, ISBN 978-0-13-715435-7) was published in 2009. In 2016, Powell gave a TED Talk on Unconscious Bias at TEDx St Louis Women's event titled It's About Time We Challenge Our Unconscious Biases.

Powell later translated her Canadian degree into a US-recognized degree, graduating from Columbia University summa cum laude with a Bachelor of Arts in Sociology and Phi Beta Kappa membership. Her thesis research, “The Limits and Possibilities in the Self-Regulation of Artificial Intelligence,” drew on her consulting for Intel Labs and other multinational companies and later served as the foundation of her book The AI Dilema.

In 2021, Powell joined the Faculty of New York University’s Interactive Telecommunications Program, teaching courses at the intersection of media, technology, and ethics.

== Death ==
Powell died of complications from acute bacterial meningitis in New York, on June 3, 2025, at the age of 54.

| Preceded by Melinda Gillies | Miss Canada; 1989 | Succeeded by Robin Lee Ouzunoff |
