= Micheline Rawlins =

Canadian judge

- Born: 1951 (age 74–75); Montreal, Quebec
- Citizenship: Canada
- Education: McGill University (BA); University of Windsor (LLB)
- Occupation: Lawyer · judge
- Years active: 1986–1992 (assistant crown attorney); 1992– (judge)

Micheline A. Rawlins (born 1951) is a lawyer and judge in Ontario, Canada. She was the first black woman appointed to the Ontario Court of Justice.

== Education and career ==
She was born in Montreal, Quebec and received a BA from McGill University in 1974 and a LLB from the University of Windsor in 1978. She was called to the Ontario bar in 1982. Rawlins was an assistant Crown Attorney in Kent County from 1986 until she was named to the bench in 1992.

Rawlins has served on the board of governors for the University of Windsor. She has also served on the boards for various organizations such as the Girl Guides, the Boy Scouts, Robinson House, the Windsor Urban Alliance and the Windsor Media Council.

In 2002, Justice Rawlins received national media attention for attacking a female lawyer's choice of clothing, and adjourning a case for "lack of counsel" because she objected to the lawyer's attire.

== Community contributions ==
Rawlins was the president of the Chatham Youth Soccer Association from 1990 to 1993 and is also a qualified hockey trainer. She served as the President of the North American Black Historical Museum (2003–07 and of the Association of Black Judges of Michigan.

== Honours and awards ==
Madame Justice Rawlins has received:

- the North American Black Historical Museum Community Contribution Award in 1994
- the African-Canadian Achievement Award in Law in 1997
- the Canadian Association of Black Lawyers Black Judges in Canada Recognition Award in 2000
- the Congress of Black Women of Canada Outstanding Contribution to Women, to Law and to Canada Award in 2002

In 2004, she was named Windsor Woman of the Year.

The Loop named her in its list of 10 amazing Canadian women who deserve to be on a 100-dollar bill.
