= Master T =

Radio and television personality

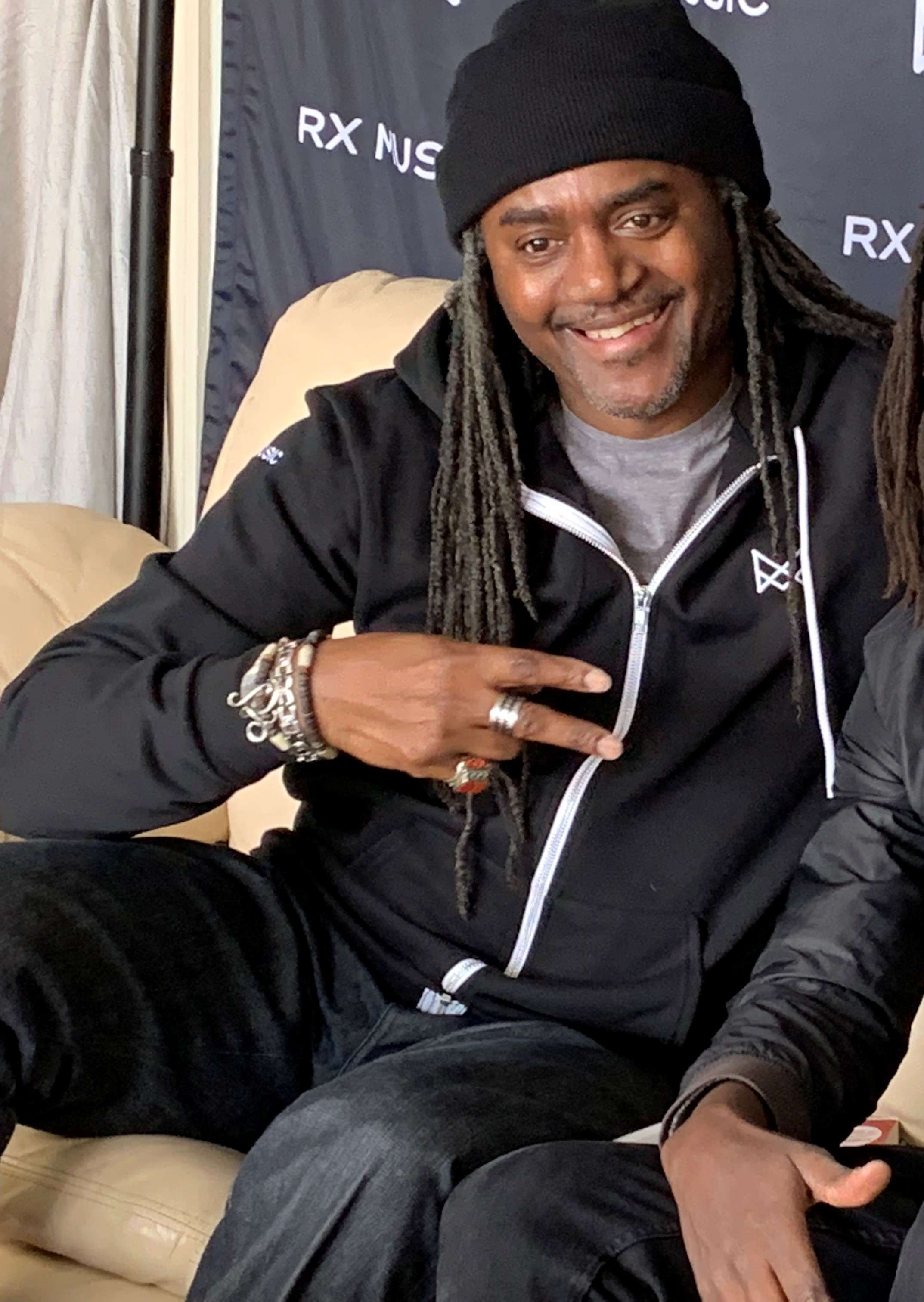
- Master T in London, Ontario for the 2019 JUNO Awards
- Born: Tony Young; Leeds, England
- Education: Mohawk College
- Known for: X-tendamix and Da Mix

Tony Young (born 1961), professionally known as Master T, is a Canadian television and radio personality and urban music promoter.

== Early life and education ==
Born in Leeds, England, Young moved to Canada with his Jamaican family in 1974. He attended Kitchener-Waterloo Collegiate and Vocational School in Kitchener, Ontario. He met his future wife Paula as a student at the school. He got involved in acting to help with feeling shy about his accent and lisp.

== Career ==
Following graduation from high school he studied television broadcasting at Mohawk College in Hamilton. Young landed his first job in media in 1983 at Toronto's CFMT-DT where he worked as a playback operator. In his off-hours he reported on Black culture for the stations program Black World.

=== MuchMusic ===
Young joined MuchMusic in 1984 as a camera operator. As a VJ for MuchMusic, Young (as "Master T") continued to host various programs, including Rap City, from 1990 to 2001. When he left MuchMusic, his on-air farewell party featured an exclusive live performance by Lauryn Hill.

During his time with Much, Master T was the primary promoter of the channel's Much DanceMix series of compilation CDs, and received a Diamond plaque for over one million in sales.

=== Post-MuchMusic career ===
Since leaving MuchMusic, he has produced and promoted his own Master T's series of hip hop and reggae compilations.

In 2014, he publicly called for the "Much" television channel to return to the hands of Moses Znaimer. Young has also hosted the syndicated radio program Wall of Sound, produced by CIDC-FM.

As of 2017, Young has been hosting the online interview and performance series RX Music LIVE, featuring past guests such as Wyclef Jean, Kardinal Offishall, Vance Joy and more.

== Awards ==
Young has been awarded a Toronto Bob Marley award, a Ghanaian Community Award, and a Mohawk College Alumni of Distinction award.

== Bibliography ==
- Young, Tony; Higgins, Dalton (2002). Much Master T. ECW Press. p. 264. ISBN 1-55022-541-3. Foreword by Shaggy. https://mastertisback.weebly.com/
