= James Moffat (author) =

British writer (1922–1993)

- Born: 27 January 1922; Canada
- Died: 8 November 1993 (aged 71); Cheltenham, England
- Education: Queen's University
- Occupation: Writer

James Moffat (27 January 1922 – 8 November 1993) was a Canadian-born British writer who wrote at least 290 novels in several genres under at least 45 pseudonyms".

Moffat produced many pot-boiler paperbacks novels for the United Kingdom publishing house New English Library during the 1970s. Moffat's pen names included Richard Allen, Etienne Aubin (The Terror of the Seven Crypts) and Trudi Maxwell (Diary of A Female Wrestler). Moffat's pulp novels mostly focused on youth subcultures of the late 1960s and 1970s, such as skinheads, hippies and bikers. In particular, Moffat wrote a series of popular and commercially successful books featuring what came to be known as his most famous protagonist, the skinhead antihero Joe Hawkins. Moffat often expressed admiration for his subject matter and commented on social issues, mostly from a right-wing perspective.

The collected works of Richard Allen were reissued in a six-volume set by ST Publishing in the 1990s. A BBC TV documentary about his life, entitled Skinhead Farewell, aired in 1996. Mark Sargeant wrote a feature in Scootering Magazine titled The Richard Allen Legacy. An interview titled The Return of Joe Hawkins with publisher George Marshall was in issue seven of Skinhead Times (1992).

Under his own name, Moffat wrote at least two science fiction novels: The Sleeping Bomb (New English Library, 1970; US edition 1973, The Cambri Plot) and a Queen Kong (1977) a movie tie-in to the low-budget 1976 movie of that name.

== Books written as Richard Allen ==
Skinhead series

New English Library published 18 Skinhead novels by Richard Allen.

- Skinhead (June 1970)
- Suedehead (1971)
- Demo (1971)
- Boot Boys (1972)
- Skinhead Escapes (1972)
- Skinhead Girls (1972)
- Glam (1973)
- Smoothies (1973)
- Sorts (1973)
- Teeny Bopper Idol (1973)
- Top Gear Skin (1973)
- Trouble for Skinhead (1973)
- Skinhead Farewell (1974)
- Dragon Skins (1975)
- Terrace Terrors (1975)
- Knuckle Girls (1977)
- Punk Rock (1977)
- Mod Rule (1980)
