= Louisa Ann Johnson =

Canadian merchant (1829–1911)

Louisa Ann Johnson (between 1829 and 1851 – December 29, 1911) was a Canadian merchant and church supporter of African descent.

The daughter of John and Clarissa Johnson (or Johnston) who left the United States during the War of 1812, she was born in Halifax. Her mother operated a variety store. Johnson worked as a dressmaker until 1877. Following her mother's death in 1881, Johnson took over the operation of the store; she also sold second hand goods and operated as a herbalist. She inherited three properties which she rented out. She contributed to the African Baptist Association of Nova Scotia and to her church, Cornwallis Street Baptist Church. She also served as Sunday school teacher and helped establish the Pastor's Aid Society, serving as its president. In 1892, she was a delegate to the African Baptist Association's annual meeting, one of the first female delegates. She helped organize the visit of African American congressman George Henry White to Halifax in 1898.

Johnson voted in the Halifax municipal elections of 1895 and 1897.

She was married three times: first to John F. Brown, then in 1877 to Alexander C. Bailey and finally to George Washington Tillman in February 1911.

She died in Halifax in 1911. In her will, she left donations to six churches for African Canadians with the remainder of her estate going to her nephews James Robinson Johnston and William Robinson Johnston.
