= Samito =

Montréal-based singer - songwriter

Samito Samuel Matsinhe
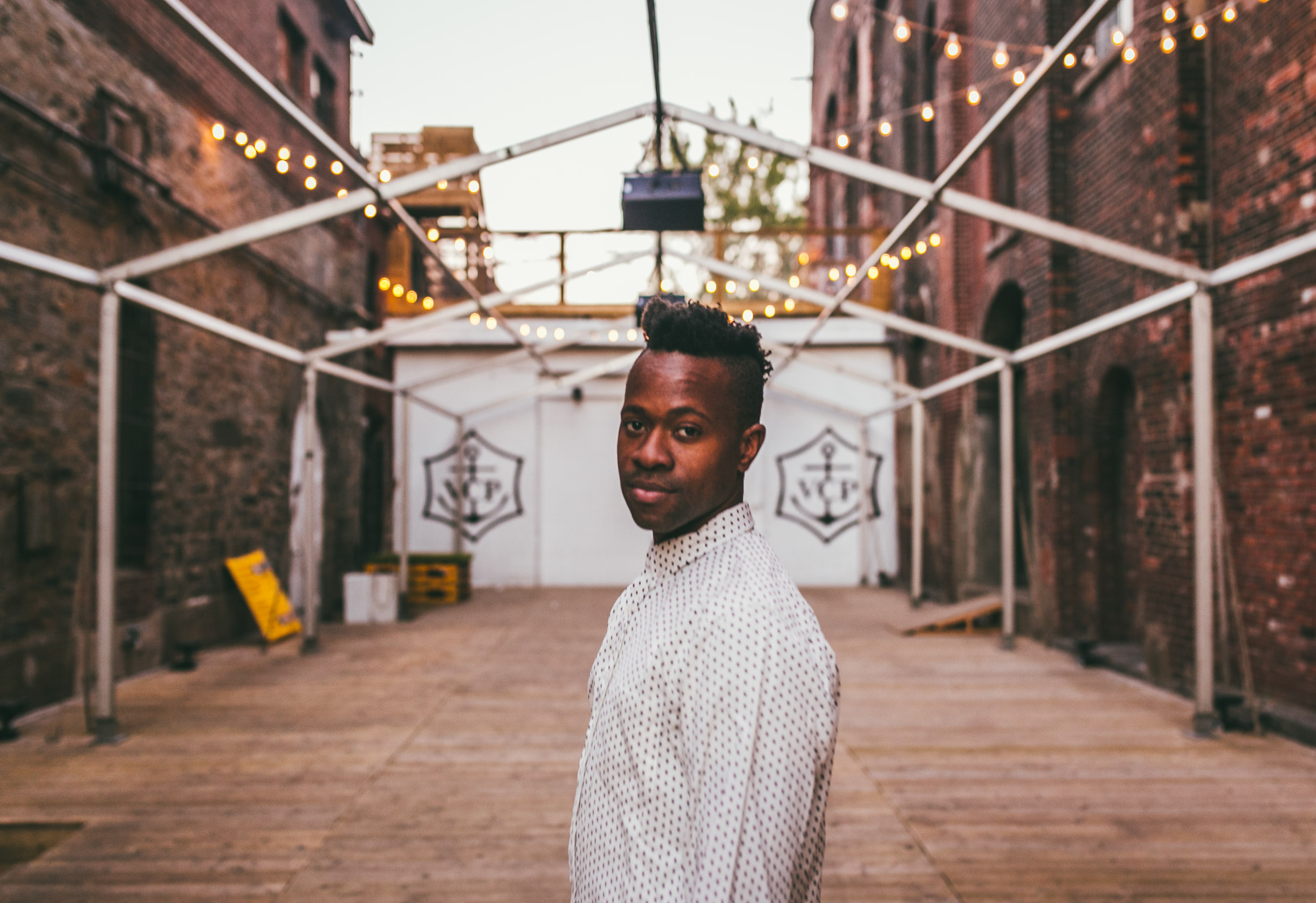
- Samito in 2021

Background information
- Born: Maputo, Mozambique
- Origin: Montreal-based
- Occupations: Musician, singer, and producer.
- Labels: Fezihaus, Costume Records & Man Recordings
- Website: www.fezihaus.com

Samito is a Mozambican-Canadian musician who founded Fezihaus, a Montréal-based creative company, in 2020.

A music graduate from McGill University, Samito first came to public attention in 2016 with his song Tiku La Hina. He has performed at SXSW, Osheaga, Pop Montreal, MAMA Festival & Convention, Reeperbahn, and Festival d'été de Québec. In 2016, he released Cem Cem (feat. Mabika & Muneshine) on the French lifestyle brand and music label Kitsuné. In 2017, he followed with I Saw You, an electro-inspired club song released with Berlin-based label Man Recordings. His music is primarily sung in Portuguese.

== Career ==
Born in Maputo, Mozambique, Samito moved to Montréal in 2005, to pursue his studies and later a career in music. In Montréal, he collaborated with SPRLUA, Rymz, Arthur Comeau, Philippe Brault, Radio Radio, Pierre Kwenders Poirier, among others.

Samito was one of Radio Canada's 2015-2016 upcoming artist of the year.

On May 27, 2016, he released his debut album, the self-titled Samito. The single Tiku la Hina was released, with an accompanying music video broadcast on Canadian music channels Much and MusiquePlus. The album was awarded the 2017 Félix Award for World Music Album Of The Year at Québec's Gala De L’ADISQ.

Samito's credits and collaborations include Gotan Project's Philippe Cohen-Solal, Daniel Haaksman, Dakat, Muneshine and Pierre Kwenders.

== Discography ==
=== Albums ===
Title and details
''Samito''
- Type: Album
- Released: May 27, 2016
- Record label: Costume Records
Notes

No.	Title	Length
1.	"Senhora"	3:33
2.	"LOL"	2:25
3.	"Nara (It's All About Trust)"	3:52
4.	"Flôr"	3:29
5.	"Oskia"	3:29
6.	"Ana"	3:02
7.	"Here we go (Old Friend)"	3:31
8.	"Tiku la hina"	3:54

Title and details
''I Saw You''
- Type: EP
- Released: April 27, 2017
- Record label: Man Recordings
Notes

No.	Title	Length
1.	"I Saw You"	3:10
2.	"I Saw You (Daniel Haaksman Remix)"	4:33
3.	"I Saw You - Mina Remix"	3:44
4.	"I Saw You - Jinku Remix"	5:44

=== Singles / Videos ===
- 2016: "Tiku la hina"
- 2016: "Cem Cem"
- 2017: "I Saw You"
