= Virnetta Anderson =

American-Canadian community activist and politician

- Born: Virnetta Nelson; October 29, 1920; Monticello, Arkansas
- Died: February 11, 2006 (aged 85)
- Citizenship: United States · Canada
- Education: Metropolitan School of Business
- Occupation: Municipal Councillor
- Spouse: Ezzrett Anderson

Virnetta Anderson, née Nelson (1920–2006) was an American-Canadian community activist and politician, who was elected to Calgary City Council in 1974 as the city's first Black Canadian municipal councillor.

== Personal life and education ==
She was born Virnetta Nelson in Monticello, Arkansas, then raised and educated in Hot Springs, Arkansas. Her mother was a teacher (before being a stay-at-home mother) and her father worked at a tourist spa.

She received further education attending the Arkansas Agricultural, Mechanical & Normal College (AM&N College), now known as the University of Arkansas at Pine Bluff, in addition to the Metropolitan School of Business in Los Angeles, California.

She moved to Calgary in 1952 after her husband, Ezzrett Anderson, was drafted by the Calgary Stampeders of the Canadian Football League. She and Ezzrett had three sons.

== Career ==
She was elected to Calgary's city council in 1974. Her projects as a city councillor included a fact-finding mission to Germany to research innovations in public transit as part of the early development of the city's CTrain system, serving on the committee that conducted the original feasibility study on the Calgary Centre for the Performing Arts, and opposing the extension of Sarcee Trail across the Weaselhead Flats. Mayor Rod Sykes would later praise her work on council by saying that "She was one of the very best aldermen I ever had in three city councils. She never played council games, which often left her isolated, but she was intellectually honest, and when she spoke, she spoke common sense."

She was defeated in her reelection bid in 1977 and returned to community involvement, including sitting on the board of directors of the Calgary Centre for the Performing Arts and serving on various municipal advisory committees. She took up a career in real estate while engaging deeply with the community.

== Community contributions ==
In Calgary, she became active in the United Church of Canada and the Rotary Club where she was later named a Paul Harris Fellow by the Calgary Rotary Club in 1988.

She was a member of the Mount Royal College Ladies Auxiliary and the President of the Calgary Seniors Showcase Society.

She co-founded and became president of the city's Meals on Wheels from 1971–1974.

She served on the boards of the City Core Senior Citizen Centre and Calgary Welcome and Recreation Centre, Calgary's United Way chapter, Trinity Lodge, Aunts at Large, Calgary Metropolitan Foundation, Calgary Tourist and Convention Association, and the Calgary Centre for the Performing Arts (1975 to 1980).

She was both a board member and Chairman of the Calgary Committee for the Civic Centre and Mayor Klein’s Advisory Committee.

She was the directory of the Calgary chapter of the Multiple Sclerosis Society.
