= Penny Hodge =

Canadian office worker and activist

- Born: Penelope Anderson; 1920; Digby, Nova Scotia, Canada
- Died: July 5, 2016 (aged 95–96); Canada
- Occupations: Activist; Office worker

Penelope "Penny" Hodge (1920 – July 5, 2016) was a Canadian office worker and activist.

== Life and career ==
The daughter of Martin Anderson, a Baptist preacher, and Alfaretta Berry, a teacher, she was born Penelope Anderson in Digby, Nova Scotia and grew up on a farm in Yarmouth. Hodge was educated at a segregated public school. After graduating from high school, she attended teacher's college in Truro. After two years of teaching, she was hired as a clerk by the National Research Council in Ottawa. After three years, she moved to Toronto; she worked briefly for the YWCA, and then became a clerk at the Canadian Broadcasting Corporation, retiring in 1986.

Around 1952, she joined the Canadian Negro Women's Association (CANEWA), later the Congress of Black Women of Canada; she served as treasurer, then vice-president before becoming president in 1956. Hodge also provided administrative support for the Ontario Black History Society on a volunteer basis and served as historian for the First Baptist Church in Toronto.

She was married twice: first to Rupert Hodge and then to a Mr. LaVaughn.

In 2012, she received the Mary Matilda Winslow award from the Ontario Black History Society.

She died in hospital at the age of 96.
