= Phyllis Simmons Brooks =

Canadian educator (1926–2012)

- Born: Phyllis Theodosia Simmons; December 21, 1926; Bermuda
- Died: February 26, 2012 (aged 85); Canada
- Occupation: Educator

Phyllis Theodosia Simmons Brooks (December 21, 1926 – February 26, 2012) was a Canadian educator.

== Biography ==
Brooks was born in Bermuda and came to Canada on a scholarship to study teaching in 1945. She taught school in Bermuda and then, after marrying a Canadian, returned to Canada. She received a BA in English from the University of Toronto and a master's degree in education and then was a teacher and librarian with the Toronto school board for 20 years. After retiring from teaching, she taught adult literacy courses for the Toronto District School Board on a volunteer basis. Brooks also served as a member of the working committee of the Bermudian Canadian Association. While working with St. Christopher House in Toronto, she worked to raise scholarship funds for children in music programs.

Brooks received the Harriet Tubman Award from the Ontario Black History Society. She was a founding member of the Canadian Negro Women's Association (CANEWA), later the Congress of Black Women of Canada.
