= Barry Howson =

Canadian basketball player

Personal information
- Full name: Barry Franklin Howson
- Born: 17 June 1939 (age 85); London, Ontario, Canada

Sport
- Sport: Basketball

Barry Howson (born 17 June 1939) is a Canadian basketball player. He competed in the men's tournament at the 1964 Summer Olympics, and was the first Black Canadian member of Canada's Olympic basketball team.

He was the son of Frank Howson and Christine DeGroat Jenkins; his mother was the publisher of The Dawn of Tomorrow, an important early Black Canadian community newspaper which had been founded by her first husband James Jenkins. He was also the half-brother of broadcaster and activist Kay Livingstone, his mother's daughter with James Jenkins.

He attended Sir Adam Beck Secondary School in London, Ontario, where played on the school basketball team which won the Ontario Federation of School Athletic Associations provincial basketball championship in 1957. He subsequently attended the University of Western Ontario, playing basketball at the university level, before playing at the senior level for the Toronto Dow Kings, who served as Canada's Olympic basketball team in 1964.

He subsequently completed a master's in education at Wayne State University in Detroit, Michigan, and became a high school teacher and athletics coach in Sarnia in his professional life.

Because Canada had simply sent the Toronto Dow Kings to the Olympics rather than organizing an official national team, Howson's status as a pioneering Black athlete was overlooked for many years, with Canada Basketball incorrectly identifying somebody else as the first Black Canadian basketball player to compete at the Olympics in its Black History Month materials. In February 2024, the error was rectified with the organization presenting him with a trophy and a special framed Olympic jersey to commemorate his achievement.
