= Michael Williams (Canadian TV personality) =

Canadian television personality

Michael Williams is a Canadian television personality; he may be best known for his work as a VJ at MuchMusic from 1984 to 1993.

Born in Cleveland, Ohio, Williams moved to Montreal in the 1970s to attend the Communications Arts School at Loyola (now Concordia University).

Williams was part of MuchMusic's core opening team of VJ's alongside J. D. Roberts, Erica Ehm, Christopher Ward, and Denise Donlon. At MuchMusic, Williams hosted various shows including Soul in the City, RapCity, Electric Circus, Pepsi Power Hour and The NewMusic.

He was a radio personality in Hamilton, Ontario as host of the program College of Musical Knowledge on Wave 94.7. Previous radio work included Montreal's CHOM-FM and CKGM-AM, and in Toronto at CHUM-FM. Williams also owns Black Rose Recording Studios in Toronto and since January 2003, he has been teaching.

An occasional fill-in host on Newstalk 1010 in Toronto, Williams is a regular on-air contributor to CTV News's entertainment segment "Noteworthy".
