= Ezzrett Anderson =

American gridiron football player (1920–2017)

Profile
- Positions: End, Defensive back

Personal information
- Born: February 10, 1920; Nashville, Arkansas, US
- Died: March 8, 2017 (aged 97); Calgary, Alberta, Canada

Career information
- College: Kentucky State

Career history
- 1947: Los Angeles Dons
- 1948–1954: Calgary Stampeders

Awards and highlights
- CFL All-Star (1949)

Ezzrett "Sugarfoot" Anderson (February 10, 1920 – March 8, 2017) was an all-star professional Canadian football player, apioneering professional football player, Hollywood actor, and community icon. He is widely recognized as one of the first African American players to play professional football in Western Canada. He is also noted for being one of the earliest graduates from a Historically Black College or University (HBCU) to play professionally in North America.

== Biography ==
Anderson graduated from Kentucky State and turned pro in 1945 and 1946 with the Hollywood Bears in the Pacific Coast Football League (along with Chuck Anderson, who would also later play pro in Canada). After playing with the Los Angeles Dons of the All-America Football Conference in 1947, catching 11 passes for 126 yards and scoring one touchdown, he began a 6-year stay with the Calgary Stampeders of the Western Interprovincial Football Union. As a Stamp he caught 116 passes for 1576 yards and made 5 TDs, with his best year being 1950, when he caught 46 passes for 673 yards. He retired in 1954.

Following in the footsteps of Herb Trawick, he was among the first African-American players in the Canadian professional leagues. In 1990, he was inducted into the Calgary Stampeders Wall of Fame. He died on March 8, 2017, at the age of 97.

He was married to Virnetta Anderson, who was elected to Calgary City Council in 1974 as the city's first Black municipal councillor. Anderson was born in Nashville, Arkansas, on February 10, 1920, to Florence and Ezzrett Anderson Sr. baseball player in the Negro Leagues. At Kentucky State he earned a spot on an all-America football team. While there he met his first wife Virnetta, from Hot Springs, Arkansas. In 1943 they moved California to help with the war effort. "Sug", as he was often called, was a two-way star who could pass, catch and defend. He soon attracted the attention of the pros, playing with the Hollywood Bears of the Pacific Coast League in 1945-46 and the Los Angeles Dons of the All-America Football Conference in 1947. During those years Sugarfoot also found work in the movie industry, appearing in over 20 films, including a speaking role in the original Story of Seabiscuit with Shirley Temple and Barry Fitzgerald. In 1949, the Calgary Stampeders persuaded Anderson to play for Calgary. He became a popular figure both on and off the field for his talent and affable personality. He was an all-star CFL player in 1949 when the Stamps lost to the Montreal Alouettes in the Grey Cup and was one of only two Americans to make all-pro in Canada at both offence and defense. He retired at the end of 1955, was added to the Stampeders' Wall of Fame in 1990 and inducted into the Alberta Sports Hall of Fame in 2010. From 1950 to 1955 Sugarfoot had a popular radio show on CKXL, fronted a blues band called "The Bluenotes." In 2013 he was presented with the Canada's Recording Legacy Award of Recognition. Sugarfoot attended Southern Alberta Institute of Technology, where he trained as a mechanic. He owned a service station in downtown Calgary and went on to work for the group of companies that included Standard General, Inland Cement, and Genstar, retiring after 32 years. Anderson worked for the Stampeders as an account representative and ambassador for the team and the Calgary Stampeders Alumni Association. Anderson died on Wednesday, March 8, 2017, at the Foothills Hospital.
