= Leon Bibb (musician) =

American folk singer (1922–2015)

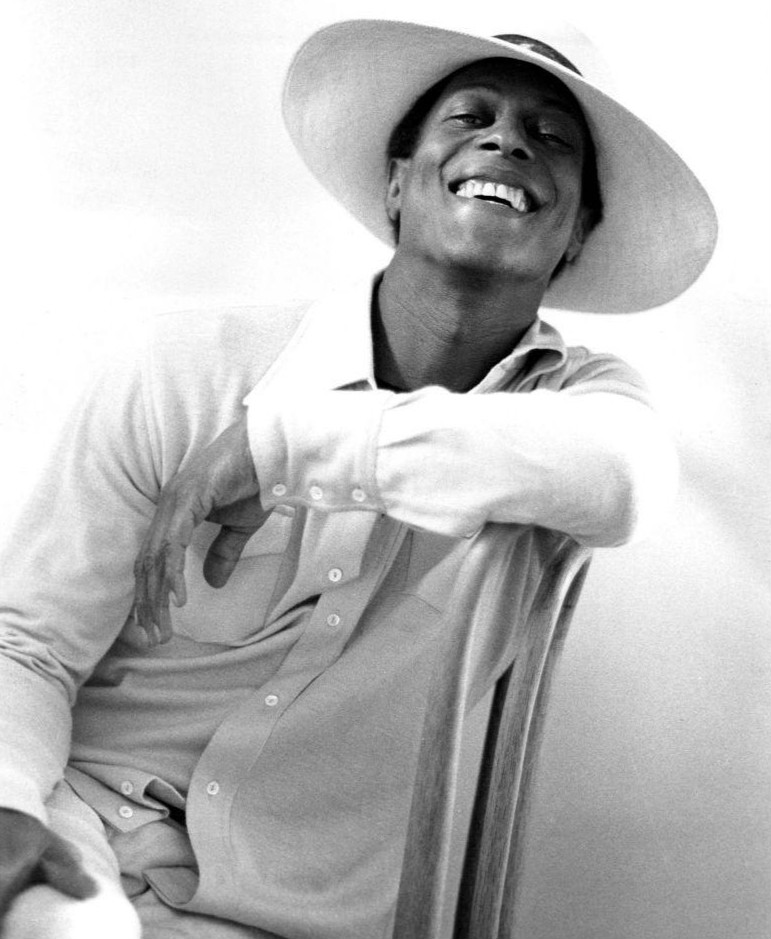
- Bibb in 1976.

Background information
- Born: February 7, 1922; Louisville, Kentucky, U.S.
- Died: October 23, 2015 (aged 93) Vancouver, British Columbia, Canada
- Genres: Folk music
- Occupations: Musician, actor
- Instrument: Vocals

Leon Bibb (February 7, 1922 – October 23, 2015) was an American-Canadian folk singer and actor. His a cappella vocals blend his classical, spiritual and blues influences. He is the father of the New York-based acoustic blues singer/songwriter Eric Bibb, and grandfather of Swedish dancer and performer Rennie Mirro.

== Life and career ==
Bibb was born in Louisville, Kentucky, studied voice in New York City, and worked on Broadway. His career began when he became a featured soloist of the Louisville Municipal College glee club as a student.

He was one of the performers at the first Newport Folk Festival in 1959. He also had his own NBC television talk show.

During the late-1950s and early-1960s, Bibb was one of a number of American entertainers, such as his good friend Paul Robeson, who were blacklisted for alleged ties to left-wing groups and causes. Despite that setback, Bibb continued to perform, and around 1963–64 he was featured singing on the national TV show, Hootenanny, on The Ed Sullivan Show and performed with Bill Cosby on tours.

In October 1963, Bibb was interviewed about folk music and his recent live album, "Encore! Leon Bibb in Concert", on Folk Music Worldwide, an international short-wave radio station in New York City. In 1963, Bibb traveled to Mississippi to join Dick Gregory and others in the fight against racial segregation in the United States.

He also provided the soundtrack to Luis Buñuel's 1960 film The Young One. Bibb appeared on an episode of Sesame Street in November 1970.

He lived in Vancouver, British Columbia, Canada, after 1969.In 2009, he was made a Member of the Order of British Columbia. At the time of receiving this honour, Bibb was still an active performer.

== Discography ==
=== Studio albums ===
- Leon Bibb Sings Folk Songs (Vanguard, 1959)
- Tol' My Captain (Vanguard, 1960)
- Leon Bibb Sings Love Songs (Vanguard, 1960)
- Leon Bibb Sings (Columbia, 1961)
- Oh Freedom and Other Spirituals (Washington, 1962)
- Cherries & Plums (Liberty, 1964)
- The Now Composers (Phillips, 1967)
- Foment, Ferment, Free... Free (RCA, 1969)
- This Is Leon Bibb (RCA, 1970)
- Shenandoah (Leon Bibb Productions, 1997)
- Lift Every Voice And Sing (2003)

=== Live album ===
- Encore! (Liberty, 1963)

=== Collaborative albums ===
- The Skifflers: Goin' Down To Town (Epic, 1957)
- Leon & Eric Bibb: A Family Affair (Manhaton, 2002)
- Leon & Eric Bibb: Praising Peace: A Tribute To Paul Robeson (Stony Plain, 2006)
