= Nam Kiwanuka =

Ugandan-Canadian television personality and journalist

Namugenyi Kiwanuka
- Born: Nam Kiwanuka; 1975 (age 50–51); Uganda
- Other name: Mary Namugenyi
- Citizenship: Ugandan-Canadian
- Education: Toronto Metropolitan University
- Occupations: Television personality, Journalist, sports commentator
- Employer: TVOntario
- Known for: Television presenter
- Website: http://www.namkiwanuka.com/

Mary Namugenyi "Nam" Kiwanuka (born Namugenyi Kiwanuka) is a Ugandan-Canadian television personality and journalist, currently the host of the TVO news and documentary program The Thread.

Kiwanuka came to Canada with her family in 1983, following the civil war in Uganda. She was given the Anglo-Protestant moniker Mary. She was a VJ for MuchMusic from 1999 to 2003 and later hosted basketball and football programming on Sportsnet that included the weekly NBA XL program. She was subsequently a reporter and substitute anchor on TVOntario's newsmagazine series The Agenda, from 2016 until the program was cancelled in 2025 upon the retirement of host Steve Paikin.

Kiwanuka has volunteered overseas for War Child Canada, Journalists for Human Rights and the Canadian Red Cross.
