= Kay Livingstone =

Canadian social activist, actor and broadcaster

Kay Livingstone

Kathleen "Kay" Livingstone, née Jenkins (October 13, 1919 – 1975) was a Canadian social activist, actor and broadcaster. In 1973, her efforts led to the first National Congress of Black Women of Canada.

The daughter of James and Christina Jenkins, she was born in London, Ontario. Her father was an assistant judge in the local juvenile court and her parents founded a newspaper The Dawn of Tomorrow aimed at the black community. After her father's death in 1931, her mother remarried to Frank Howson, and Livingstone was the half-sister of Canadian Olympic athlete Barry Howson.

She studied music at The Royal Conservatory of Music in Toronto, Ontario and elocution at the Ottawa College of Music. During World War II, she worked for the Dominion Bureau of Statistics in Ottawa, Ontario. In 1942, she married George Livingstone; the couple had five children. While in Ottawa, she became the host of her own radio program, The Kathleen Livingstone Show. When the couple moved to Toronto, she hosted radio shows for several stations, including a CBC affiliate. In 1951, she founded a Toronto social club then known as The Dilettantes; it was soon renamed to the Canadian Negro Women’s Club, later the Canadian Negro Women’s Association (CANEWA), and Livingstone became its first president, serving from 1951 to 1953. The association began providing scholarships to encourage Black students to stay in school. CANEWA later organized the Calypso Carnival, which later became known as Caribana.

She also performed in amateur and professional theatrical productions and was referred to as "one of Canada’s leading Black actresses" during this period.

Livingstone served as president of the United Nations Association in Canada, as regional chair of the National Black Coalition, as a moderator for Heritage Ontario and as a member of the Appeal Board of Legal Aid.

Just before her sudden death in 1975, she was working as a consultant for the Canadian Privy Council, helping to organize a national conference for visible minority women. Livingstone is credited with first using the term "visible minority".

== Legacy ==
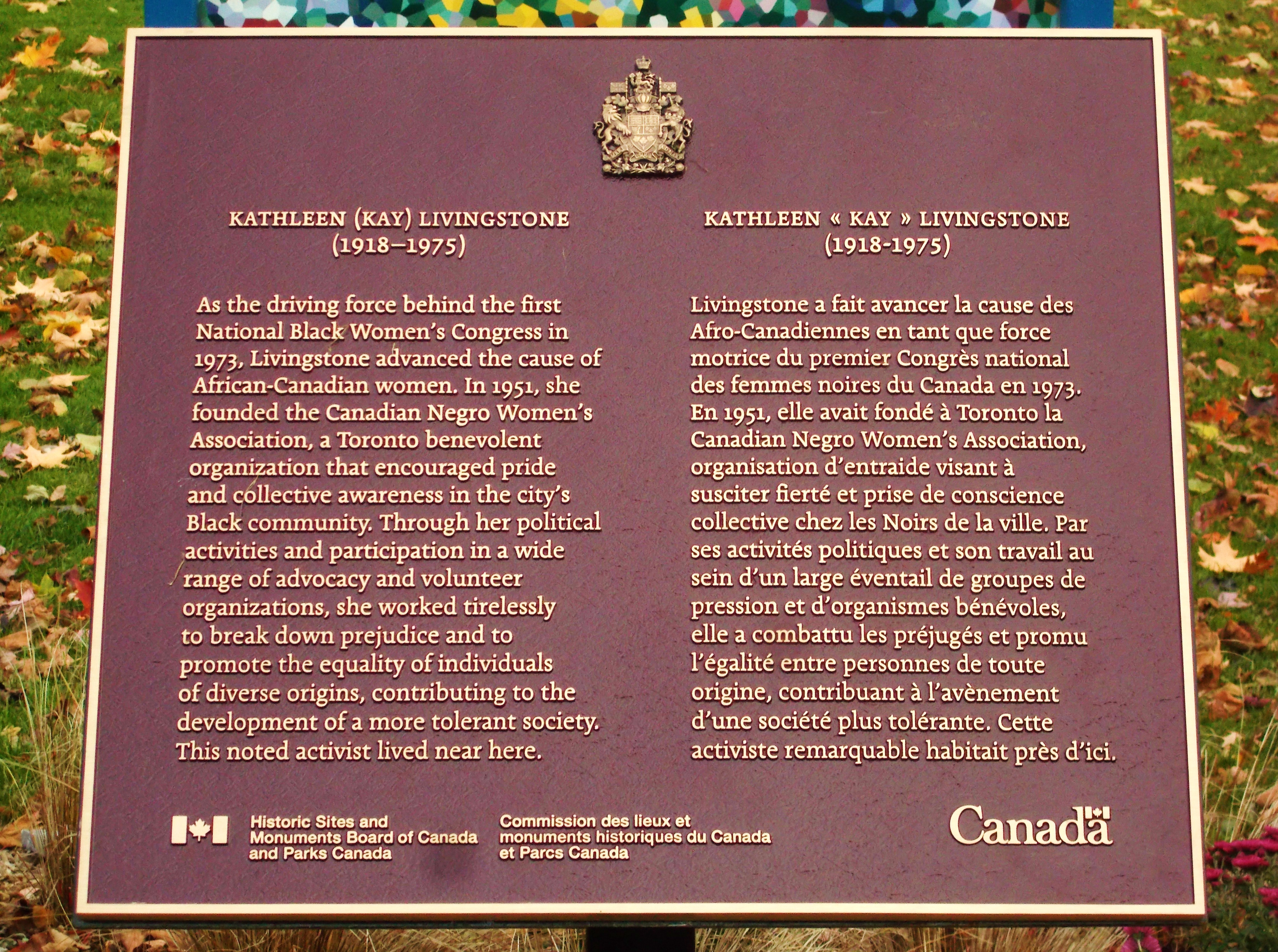
Federal historical marker to Kay Livingstone in Toronto

Following Livingstone's death, Carrie Best formed the Kay Livingstone Visible Minority Women's Society. The Kay Livingstone Award is given to Black women in Canada to encourage them to "improve the lives of other women of colour and their families".

In 2011, Livingstone was recognized by the federal government as a Person of National Historic Significance. A plaque reflecting that status was erected in 2017 near her Toronto home.

In November, 2017, the postal service announced Livingstone would appear on a postage stamp in 2018, as part of its ongoing series marking Black History Month in February. The stamp was issued on February 1, 2018, in London, Ontario, her birthplace.
