= Congress of Black Women of Canada =

Canadian non-profit organization

- Congrès des femmes noires du Canada
- Abbreviation: CBWC
- Formation: 1973
- Founder: Kay Livingstone
- Type: Non-profit organization
- Headquarters: Canada
- Members: Black women aged 16 and older; Black female-led organizations with similar aims
- Website: https://cbwc-ontario.org/

The Congress of Black Women of Canada (CBWC) / Congrès des femmes noires du Canada, which began in 1973, is a national non-profit organization that "is dedicated to improving the lives of all Black women and their families in their local and national communities." It arose to organize Canadian Black women and focus on their specific issues and concerns, separate from the general women's movement and Black nationalist organizations, which did not always represent the interests of Black women around issues of race, gender, and class oppression. The organizing and advocacy work of the CBWC has focused on "such issues as health, housing, racism, education, immigration, criminal law, police-community relations and child development."

== History ==
The Congress of Black Women of Canada (CBWC) was formed in 1973 in Toronto with Kathleen "Kay" Livingstone as Chair. It developed out of the Canadian Negro Women's Association (CANEWA), which began in 1951, with Kay Livingstone as its first president. Its first meeting was held at the Westbury Hotel in Toronto, and gathered 200 Black women from across Canada. The organisation was open to many and its two distinctive rules were that membership was open to all Black women who were at least sixteen years of age, as well as any Black female led organisations whose aims were similar to those of the Congress. Some of these aims included providing educational programs for Black women, planning and implementing a program of services to fulfill the requirements of Black women and their families. It also was established as a "vehicle for Black women to openly examine issues which affect them."

They are represented symbolically by a cactus. The Toronto Regional Chapter's second issue of publication, Speak Out, stated that: "the cactus is a plant symbolic of the strengths and resilience of Black women. No matter how arid the soil... The cactus survives, multiplies and bears fruit." The 10th anniversary publication by the Montreal Regional Committee in 1984 included the motto: "the cactus survives; she survives; and the race survives", showcasing the importance of the cactus symbolically to the organization and its resilience.

The CBWC incorporated as a registered non-profit organisation in 1980 at their fifth conference in Winnipeg, and the constitution was ratified and a National Executive Council was elected.

On January 17, 1987, former National President Dr. Glenda P. Simms addressed the Coalition of Visible Minority Women in order to "critically examine" the women's movement in Canada. Simms was quoted to say: "I want to get on record in saying that we are not an issue. We are people." The discussion surrounding a woman's movement, REAL Women, that opposed "equal pay and favouring to return to traditional family values." Dr. Simms advocated for movements such as the Congress, and stated: "That's the message we're going to tell mainstream Canadian women. We're going to get our act together, and we're going to show them what a real women's movement should be." The Congress stood behind Dr. Simms words and advocates as a movement that which calls for marginalised women to define themselves. In 1990 Dr. Simms was appointed as the first Black president of the Canadian Advisory Council on the Status of Women.

Jean Augustine, who founded the Toronto chapter of the CBWC in 1973, became president of the organization in 1987, and was awarded the first annual Kay Livingstone award that year.

Past Conferences
Year	Location	Theme
1973	Toronto	The Black Woman Today
1974	Montreal	The Black Woman and Her Family
1976	Halifax	Crisis of the Black Woman
1977	Windsor	Impetus, the Black Woman
1980	Winnipeg	Concerns for the 80s
1982	Edmonton	Black Women and the Workplace
1987	Vancouver	On the Move... Forward Together

== Ontario Regional Chapters ==
Regional Chapter Presidents
Regional Chapter	Current President
Waterloo	Marcia Smellie
Scarborough	Chantal Joseph
Oshawa and Whitby	Angela Todd Anderson
Mississauga	vacant
Markham	Jessica Ketawaroo-Green
London	Nikisha Evans
Brampton	Patricia Challenger Brade
Ajax and Pickering	Magdalene Lesmond

=== Waterloo ===
The Waterloo Regional Chapter was initially formed in 1988, at the home of Veronica Norris-Lue. The first local president was Chloe Callander.

=== Scarborough ===
The Scarborough Regional Chapter was founded in 1985. Their purpose was to provide a network of solidarity for Black Women in the Scarborough region, with Scarborough's growing Black population in mind, and to act as a united voice in the defence and extension of human rights and liberties for Black Women of Canada.

=== Oshawa and Whitby ===
The Oshawa and Whitby Regional Chapter was founded by Ettie Rutherford in March 2007.

=== Mississauga ===
The Mississauga Regional Chapter was established in 1985.

=== Markham ===
The Markham Regional Chapter was established in February 2021, making it one of the most recent chapters of the Congress.

=== London ===
The London Regional Chapter was established in 1989 by Gwen Jenkins. The objectives of the London, Ontario chapter were to address the "social, economic and cultural issues of all Black women."

=== Brampton ===
The Brampton Regional Chapter was established in 1989 by Claudia Russell-Placenia, Silvilyn Holt, Jacqueline Maloney, and Veronica Lee Edwards.

=== Ajax and Pickering ===
The Ajax and Pickering Regional Chapter was founded in March 1996.

=== Former Ontario Regional Chapters ===
The Congress has evolved in numerous ways since its conception in 1973, and so with the establishment of new Chapters came the end to ones formerly known as the Durham, Oakville, Toronto and North York.

== See also ==
- The Coloured Women's Club of Montreal
- National Congress of Black Women
