= Donald Oliver =

Canadian politician (1938–2025)

The Honourable Donald H. Oliver CM ONS KC

Senator for South Shore, Nova Scotia
- In office September 7, 1990 – November 16, 2013
- Appointed by: Brian Mulroney

Personal details
- Born: November 16, 1938 Wolfville, Nova Scotia, Canada
- Died: September 17, 2025 (aged 86) Halifax, Nova Scotia, Canada
- Party: Conservative
- Children: One daughter
- Profession: Lawyer

Donald H. Oliver CM ONS KC (November 16, 1938 – September 17, 2025) was a Canadian lawyer, developer and politician. Appointed by former Prime Minister Brian Mulroney, Oliver served in the Senate of Canada from 1990 until 2013. He was the first black male to sit in the Senate and the second black Canadian appointed to the chamber.

A lawyer and real estate developer, Oliver was a member of Nova Scotia's black minority. He was descended in part from African-American slave refugees who were resettled by the British in Canada from the United States after the War of 1812. But his maternal grandfather, William A. White, migrated independently in 1900 from Baltimore, Maryland. Oliver was the nephew of Canadian opera singer Portia White, politician Bill White and labour union activist Jack White, and the cousin of political strategist Sheila White.

== Early life and education ==
Oliver was born to Helena Isabella (White) and Clifford Harlock Oliver in Wolfville, Nova Scotia. He has four siblings. His maternal grandfather, William A. White, migrated independently in 1900 from Baltimore, Maryland, and became a Baptist minister. His maternal grandmother Izie Dora White (her maiden name) was born in Nova Scotia, descended from black refugees who went to Canada from the United States during the War of 1812.

Oliver attended local schools before his undergraduate studies at Acadia University, where he graduated with a degree in philosophy in 1960, and law school at Dalhousie University. He was called to the Bar in 1965.

== Education and before politics ==
Oliver practised law in Halifax, Nova Scotia, as a partner in the firm Stewart McKelvey Stirling Scales from 1965 to 1990, and subsequently at two other law firms for a total of 36 years, primarily in civil litigation. He taught at Dalhousie University Law School as a part-time professor for 14 years, and also taught law courses at Technical University of Nova Scotia and Saint Mary's University. He was a King's Counsel.

== Politics ==
A long-time activist in the Progressive Conservative Party, Oliver served as the party's director of legal affairs through six federal elections, from 1972 to 1988. He also served as a federal vice-president of the party and as a director of its fundraising wing, the PC Canada Fund.

Oliver also served for years as Constitution Chairman and member of the Finance Committee for the Progressive Conservative Association of Nova Scotia, and was a Vice-President of that Party.

== Appointment to the Senate ==
Oliver was appointed to the Senate at the recommendation of Prime Minister Brian Mulroney, September 7, 1990. He served as a member of the Standing Senate Committee on Banking, Trade and Commerce, and as the Chairman of the Senate Standing Committees on Transport and Communications and Standing Committee on Agriculture and Forestry. Senator Oliver was also Co-chair of the Special Joint Committee on a Code of Conduct for Parliamentarians. He has worked on a number of Private Members’ Bills, including a bill to amend sections of the criminal code dealing with stalking and, more recently, a bill to address the issue of spam.

Oliver was named Speaker pro tempore of the Senate of Canada, March 4, 2010. Oliver retired from the Senate November 16, 2013, when he attained age 75.

Oliver was active in community service: "serving in positions that have included President and Chairman of the Halifax Children's Aid Society; Chairman, President and Director of the Neptune Theatre Foundation; Director of the Halifax-Dartmouth Welfare Council; Founding Director of the Black United Front; and Founding President and First Chairman of the Society for the Protection and Preservation of Black Culture in Nova Scotia."

== Personal life and death ==
Oliver was married and had one daughter. When not in Ottawa, Oliver resided on his farm in Queens County, Nova Scotia. He was an honorary patron with Crossroads International. In 1962, he was a Crossroads volunteer to Ethiopia. Oliver said this experience changed him forever.

Oliver died in Halifax on September 17, 2025, at the age of 86.

== Honours ==
On December 28, 2019, Governor General Julie Payette announced that Oliver had been appointed a member of the Order of Canada. Oliver was appointed to the Order of Nova Scotia in 2020.
