= William A. White =

First black officer in the Canadian Army

William Andrew White II
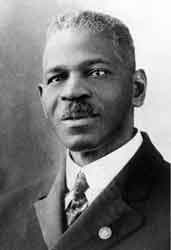
- Reverend William A. White c. 1920s
- Born: 16 June 1874; King and Queen County, Virginia
- Died: 9 September 1936 (aged 62); Halifax, Nova Scotia, Canada
- Military career
- Allegiance: Canada
- Branch: Canadian Army
- Service years: 1916-1919
- Rank: Honorary Captain
- Conflicts: First World War

William Andrew White II (June 16, 1874 – September 9, 1936) was a Canadian chaplain and military officer from Nova Scotia who was commissioned as the first black officer in the Canadian Army. He served in World War I as a military chaplain, only one of seven Black officers in the Canadian military during the war.

He and his wife had thirteen children, many of whom achieved national distinction. They included classical singer Portia White and politicians Bill White and Jack White. In 1936, White was awarded an honorary doctorate from Acadia University, the first Black Canadian to be given an honorary doctorate.

== Early years ==
White, who like his father went by his middle name, Andrew, was born in 1874 to former slaves in King and Queen County, Virginia. He moved to the city of Baltimore, Maryland, where he lived with his brother and attended Wayland Seminary in Washington. After Helena Blackadar, a Canadian Baptist missionary and school teacher of his, impressed him with descriptions of the province, where freed American slaves had been resettled after the Revolutionary War, White moved to Nova Scotia in 1900. He had imagined this land as his key to freedom. He became the second black man accepted by Acadia University, and in 1903 became its first black graduate. White graduated with an arts degree in theology, and was ordained a Baptist minister. He worked the next two years as a traveling missionary for the African Baptist churches of Nova Scotia.

== Family ==
White met and married Izie Dora White (no relation) of Mill Village, Nova Scotia. She was a descendant of Black Loyalists. Together they raised a family of thirteen children. One of their daughters, Portia White, became a world-famous singer. Son Bill White Jr., became the first Black Canadian to run for federal political office in Canada when he stood as a candidate for the Co-operative Commonwealth Federation in the 1949 federal election. Son Jack, was a noted Canadian labour union activist and the second black candidate to run for office in the Legislative Assembly of Ontario.

== World War I ==
In 1916, White enlisted in the No. 2 Construction Battalion, an all-black segregated unit serving in World War I. He was the only black chaplain in the Canadian military and was a commissioned officer serving with the rank of Honorary Captain.

== Ministry ==
Following the war, White returned to Halifax and was called to Cornwallis Street Baptist Church. He served as rector for more than 17 years. During the early 1930s, his services were broadcast over the radio every month, and they were heard throughout the Maritimes. He died of pneumonia on September 9, 1936 in Halifax.

== Legacy and honours ==
- He was the first black person to be honoured with a Doctorate of Divinity from Acadia.
- White and Izie Dora's grandchildren include Senator Donald Oliver, politician and activist Sheila White, and folk musician Chris White. The novelist and playwright George Elliott Clarke is a great-grandson.
- Actor and filmmaker Anthony Sherwood, White's great nephew produced a docu-drama entitled, Honour Before Glory, based on White's diaries while he served in France during the Great War.

== See also ==
- Black Canadian
- Canadian Forces
- Military history of Nova Scotia
- Black Nova Scotians
- Cornwallis Street Baptist Church
