= Catherine Anne Martin =

Mi'kmaw filmmaker, playwright and educator

- Born: United States
- Occupations: Filmmaker, playwright, educator
- Known for: Indigenous documentary film, Mi'kmaw storytelling
- Awards: Order of Canada (2017), Senate 150 Medal (2019), Portia White Prize (2021)

Catherine Anne Martin is a Mi'kmaw filmmaker, playwright, educator, and community advocate from Millbrook First Nation in Truro, Nova Scotia and is recognized as the first Mi'kmaw filmmaker from Atlantic Canada. Martin's work spans film, theatre, education, and public service, with a focus on Mi'kmaw knowledge, oral traditions, and the representation of Indigenous women. She has produced documentary films in collaboration with the National Film Board of Canada, including The Spirit of Annie Mae (2002) on the life and unsolved murder of Mi'kmaw activist Annie Mae Pictou Aquash. Martin was awarded the Order of Canada in 2017 for her contributions to cinema, culture, and human rights works.

== Life ==
Martin was born in the United States and is a member of Millbrook Mi'kmaw community in Nova Scotia.

She graduated from Dalhousie University in 1979 with a Bachelor of Arts in Theatre Arts and later completed a Master of Education in media literacy at Mount Saint Vincent University.

== Career ==
=== Early filmmaking ===
Martin began filmmaking in 1989 with the short documentary Minqon Minqon (Rainbow Rainbow), a profile of Wolastoqiyik artist Shirley Bear, which established her as the first Mi'kmaw filmmaker in Nova Scotia.

=== Film and media ===
Martin worked with the National Film Board of Canada (NFB) and directed a range of documentaries and educational films addressing Mi'kmaw and Wabanaki histories, women's experiences, culture, art, and spirituality.

The NFB asked Martin to produce a film about Indigenous traditional child-rearing in Canada and she turned the camera on her own family to document family life in the documentary Mi'kmaq Family (Migmaoei Otjiosog) (1995).

The films The Spirit of Annie Mae (2002) and Bringing Annie Mae Home (2006), examine the life and unsolved murder of Mi'kmaw activist Annie Mae Pictou Aquash in South Dakota in 1975.

The Basket Maker (2021), about traditional basket weaving as not only a form of art but a community-building practice and source of income for women, screened at the Sarasota Native Film Festival.

Martin was chair of the board of the Aboriginal Peoples Television Network (APTN) during its first five years. She was later featured in a 2008 APTN series called Storytellers in Motion, which commemorates achievements in Canadian Indigenous film, digital, and news media.

=== Public service ===
In 1986, Martin became Dalhousie University's first Mi'kmaq Professional Careers Coordinator, working to expand access to higher education for Indigenous students.

She contributed to the Indigenous Black and Mi'kmaq Law Program and developed a community-based health education certificate.

In 2020, Martin was appointed Dalhousie University's first Director of Indigenous Community Engagement.

=== Writing and performance ===
Martin is also a playwright and storyteller. Her work Picking Up the Pieces explores the experiences of the 1917 Halifax Explosion for their ancestors and the Mi'kmaw families living at Turtle Grove. The play was connected to a photography exhibit at the Art Gallery of Nova Scotia called Kepe'kek from the Narrows of the Great Harbour.

=== Exhibitions ===
An exhibition of Martin's work, Stories of the Spirit: The Films of Catherine Martin, was presented at the Dalhousie Art Gallery in 2001.

== Reception ==
Martin's documentary The Spirit of Annie Mae received critical attention in both film and academic contexts. A review in Variety described the film as “an illuminating reconstruction” of the life and death of Annie Mae Pictou Aquash.

An academic review in Educational Media Reviews Online called the film an “excellent documentary” that draws on archival footage, interviews, and oral histories to reconstruct Aquash's life and its broader historical context.

== Recognition ==
=== Awards and honours ===
Martin received a WAVE Award from Women in Film and Television Atlantic.

Martin was appointed a Member of the Order of Canada in 2017 and received the Senate 150 Medal in 2019.

In 2021, Martin received the Portia White Prize, which honours a Nova Scotian artist who has achieved mastery in their field and made a significant impact on the province’s cultural life.

== Filmography ==
- Minqon Minqon (1989)
- Kwa'nu'te: Micmac and Maliseet Artists (1991)
- Mi'kmaq Family (Migmaoei Otjiosog) (1995)
- Spirit Wind (2000)
- The Spirit of Annie Mae (2002)
- Little Boy Who Lived with Muini’skw (2004)
- Bringing Annie Mae Home (2006)
- Democracy 250: A Mi'kmaq Perspective (2008)
- Basket Maker (2021)
