= Portia White Prize =

Largest prize of its type awarded by Province of Nova Scotia

- Description: Award for cultural and artistic excellence in Nova Scotia
- Country: Canada (Nova Scotia)
- Presented by: Arts Nova Scotia
- Website: https://artsns.ca/grants-awards/awards/portia-white-prize

The Portia White Prize is the largest prize of its type awarded by the Province of Nova Scotia and is named for Portia White, a Nova Scotian artist who rose through adversity to achieve international acclaim as a classical singer on the stages of Europe and North America. Although Portia White began her career teaching in Africville, she eventually turned her energy to developing her enormous musical talent. Portia White became a world-renowned contralto through much hard work and dedication and the financial support of the Nova Scotia Talent Trust, a charitable organization created in 1944 by the Halifax Ladies Music Club, the music community and the Province. Upon retiring from the stage, Ms. White devoted her time to teaching and coaching young singers. Her achievements continue to instill a sense of pride in the African Nova Scotian community and stand as a model to all Nova Scotians.

== Background and funding ==
The purpose of the Portia White Prize is to recognize cultural and artistic excellence on the part of a Nova Scotian artist who has attained professional status, mastery and recognition in their discipline. To enable the province of Nova Scotia to promote excellence in the arts by honouring an outstanding Nova Scotian artist who has made a significant contribution to the province’s cultural life.

The primary recipient, who is an established artist, either born in Nova Scotia or resident in the province for at least the past four years, will receive $18,000 and a certificate of recognition.

A secondary recipient, also called the "protégé", who is an emerging Nova Scotian artist or a Nova Scotian cultural organization selected by the primary recipient, will receive $7,000 and a certificate of recognition.

== Recipients ==
Year	Recipient	Notes / References
2025	Joel Plaskett	Musician and producer
2024	Alan Syliboy	Mi'kmaw artist
2023	Juanita Peters	Director and actress
2022	Cyndi Cain	Soul musician
2021	Catherine Anne Martin	Documentary filmmaker
2020	Afua Cooper	Poet and historian
2019	John Little	Blacksmith and sculptor
2018	Ronald Bourgeois	Songwriter
2017	Susan Gibson Garvey	Curator and educator
2016	Jerry Granelli	Jazz musician
2015	Walter Kemp	Choral conductor
2014	Scott Macmillan	Composer and guitarist
2013	Laurie Swim	Textile artist
2012	Thom Fitzgerald	Filmmaker
2011	James MacSwain	Collagist and filmmaker
2010	Mary Jane Lamond	Gaelic musician
2009	Mary Vingoe	Theatre director
2008	Walter Ostrom	Ceramicist
2007	Joleen Gordon	Craft historian
2006	Wayne Boucher	Abstract painter
2005	Walter Borden	Poet and actor
2004	Jim Morrow	Puppeteer and artistic director
2003	Charlotte Wilson-Hammond	Visual artist
2002	Sylvia Hamilton	Filmmaker and writer
2001	Alistair MacLeod	Novelist and short story writer
2000	Garry Kennedy	Conceptual artist
1999	Georg Tintner	Conductor
1998	George Elliott Clarke	Poet and playwright
