= All Kinds of Weather =

Studio album by Red Garland
- Released: April 1959
- Recorded: November 27, 1958
- Studio: Van Gelder Studio, Hackensack, New Jersey
- Genre: Jazz
- Length: 39:43
- Label: Prestige; PRLP 7148
- Producer: Esmond Edwards

Red Garland chronology
The Red Garland Trio (1958)	All Kinds of Weather (1959)	Red in Bluesville (1959)

Professional ratings
Review scores
Source	Rating
AllMusic	3/5 stars
The Penguin Guide to Jazz Recordings	3/4 stars

All Kinds of Weather is an album by jazz pianist Red Garland, recorded in 1958 and released in 1959 on Prestige Records.

== Track listing ==
1. "Rain" (Eugene Ford, Arthur Swanstrom) – 4:14
2. "Summertime" (George Gershwin, Ira Gershwin, DuBose Heyward) – 4:43
3. "Stormy Weather" (Harold Arlen, Ted Koehler) – 10:35
4. "Spring Will Be A Little Late This Year" (Frank Loesser) – 5:42
5. "Winter Wonderland" (Felix Bernard, Dick Smith) – 5:21
6. "'Tis Autumn" (Henry Nemo) – 9:08

== Personnel ==
- Red Garland – piano
- Paul Chambers – bass
- Art Taylor – drums
