= Portia White =

Canadian opera singer

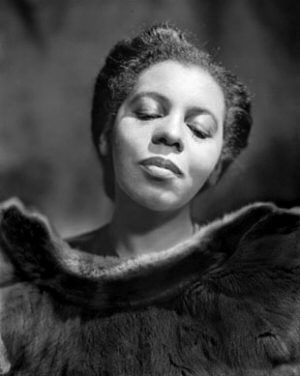
- Portrait of White, taken in 1946 by Yousuf Karsh
- Born: Portia May White; June 24, 1911; Truro, Nova Scotia, Canada
- Died: February 13, 1968 (aged 56); Toronto, Ontario, Canada
- Occupation: Contralto
- Years active: 1941–1968
- Children: 1
- Family: William A. White (father); Jack White (brother); Bill White (brother); Donald Oliver (nephew); George Elliott Clarke (grand nephew)

Portia May White (June 24, 1911 – February 13, 1968) was a Canadian contralto, known for becoming the first Black Canadian concert singer to achieve international fame. Growing up as part of her father's church choir in Halifax, Nova Scotia, White competed in local singing competitions as a teenager and later trained at the Halifax Conservatory of Music. In 1941 and 1944, she made her national and international debuts as a singer, receiving critical acclaim for her performances of both classical European music and African-American spirituals. White later completed tours throughout Europe, the Caribbean, and Central and South America.

When vocal difficulties and cancer eventually contributed to her retirement in 1952, White settled in Toronto and subsequently taught young Canadian musicians such as Lorne Greene, Dinah Christie, Don Francks, Robert Goulet and Anne Marie Moss. One of White's final major public appearances was a special command performance for Queen Elizabeth II and Prince Philip in 1964.

White was declared a person of national historic significance by the Government of Canada. Her original supporters in Nova Scotia went on to establish the Nova Scotia Talent Trust, awarding annual arts scholarships to both emerging and established local artists, and the government of Nova Scotia continues to award an annual Portia White Prize. In 2007, White was posthumously awarded a lifetime achievement award by the East Coast Music Association.

== Early life and family ==
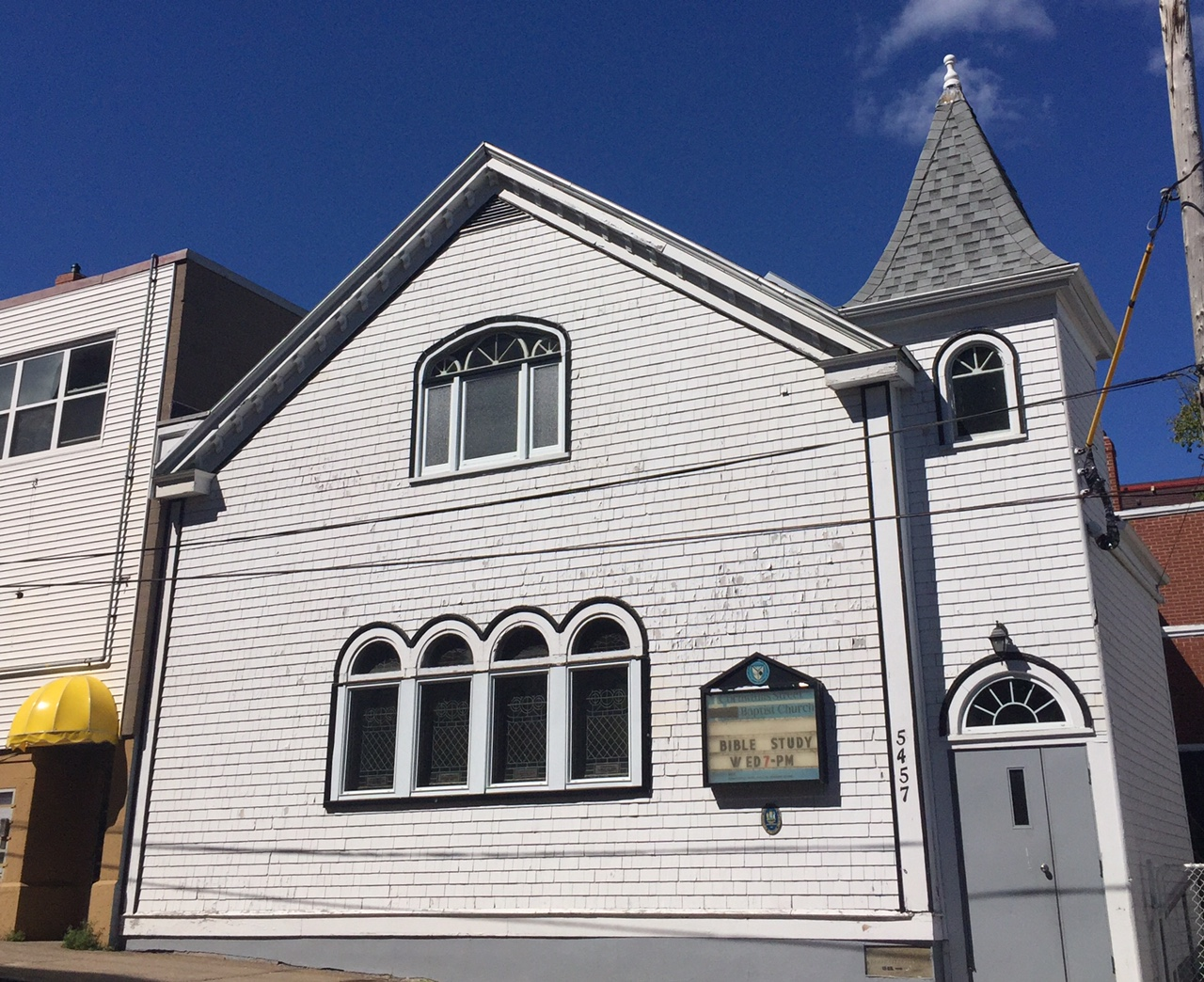
The New Horizons Baptist Church (formerly the Cornwallis Street Baptist Church)

Portia May White was born June 24, 1911, in Truro, Nova Scotia, the third of 13 children born to Izie Dora (White) and William Andrew White. Her mother was a descendant of Black Loyalists in Nova Scotia, while her father was the son of former slaves from Virginia; he moved to Canada independently. William attended Acadia University in Nova Scotia, later becoming the first Black Canadian to receive a Doctor of Divinity from Acadia. After the First World War, the White family moved to Halifax, and William became the minister of Cornwallis Street Baptist Church.

Many other members of Portia White's family went on to achieve distinction in Canadian political and cultural life, including her brothers Jack, a noted Canadian labour union leader; Bill, the first Canadian of African heritage to run for political office in Canada; and Lorne, a regular performer for television show Singalong Jubilee. White also became aunt to Senator Donald Oliver and political commentator Sheila White.

Portia White began her musical career at the age of six as a choir member with the Cornwallis Street Baptist Church, where her mother was also the musical director. As White grew older, she became the choir director and assisted with church fundraising by singing on her father's weekly radio show. In an interview later in life, White explained that her love of music and performing had developed early:

Nobody ever told me to sing, I was born singing. I think that if nobody had ever talked to me, I wouldn't be able to communicate in any other way but by singing. I was always bowing in my dreams and singing before people and parading across the stage as a very little girl.

As a teenager, White entered a local singing competition with her sister June, the pair performing an aria from Donizetti's Lucia di Lammermoor. They won first prize. Although White wanted to pursue a singing career, she could not afford professional training at the time.

White entered Dalhousie University in 1929, studying to become a teacher. From the early 1930s she taught in Africville and Lucasville, two small Halifax communities that were predominately Black Nova Scotian, and during this time White was finally able to begin paying for vocal lessons. She competed regularly at the Halifax Music Festival, winning the Helen Kennedy Silver Cup in 1935, 1937 and 1938, until the festival organizers finally decided to award her the cup permanently.

In 1939, White won a scholarship to continue her musical training at the Halifax Conservatory of Music with noted Italian baritone Ernesto Vinci, and Vinci taught her using the bel canto vocal style. White soon gave her first formal recital, and after the start of the Second World War she continued singing in concerts and radio shows. She won awards at provincial music festivals, and in mid-1941 she met Edith Read, a visiting headmistress from Branksome Hall in Toronto, who offered to arrange new performing opportunities for White.

== Singing career and later life ==
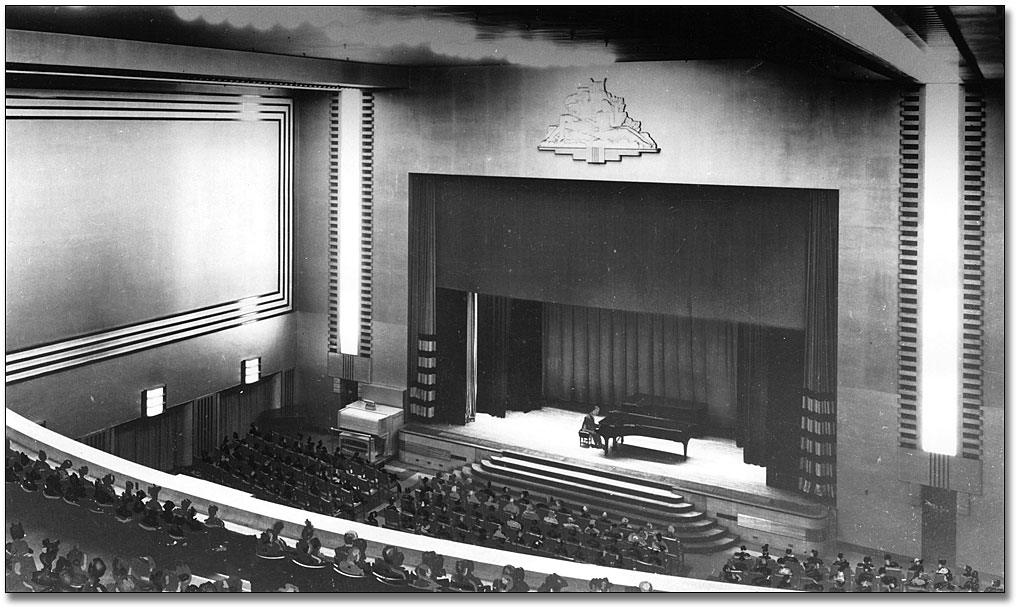
The Eaton Auditorium, c. 1945

In November 1941, with the support of Read, 30-year-old White made her national debut as a singer in Toronto at the Eaton Auditorium. She was favourably received by audiences, even receiving a career management offer from Oxford University Press the day after her performance. Despite encountering racism as she sought out new performance bookings, White subsequently toured across Canada, performing concerts at venues that included the Governor General's Rideau Hall residence.

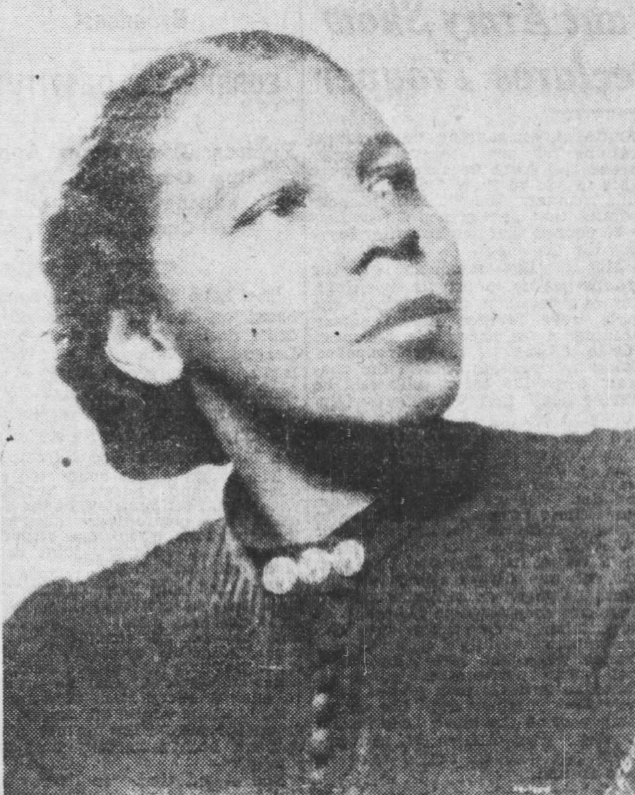
Portia White, c. 1945

White sang both classical European music and African-American spirituals, and works by Harry T. Burleigh were a constant part of her concert repertoire. Alongside English pieces, she performed music in Italian, German, French and Spanish, and White's three-octave range attracted critical acclaim. Hector Charlesworth's review in The Globe and Mail observed White's "pungent expression and beauty of utterance", while a critic with the Toronto Evening Telegram said she had a "coloured and beautifully shaded contralto ... It is a natural voice, a gift from heaven." White was compared to noted American contralto Marian Anderson.

After auditioning for Metropolitan Opera general manager Edward Johnson, White made her international debut in New York City in 1944, becoming the first Canadian to perform at New York's Town Hall performance space. The New York Times reported her performance as "remarkable," and Paul Bowles of the New York Herald Tribune wrote that "White, contralto, showed the public ... that she not only has a magnificent vocal instrument, but that she also has sufficient musicianship and intelligence to do what she wishes with it."

White went on to sing at many more concerts across the United States. The province of Nova Scotia and the city of Halifax provided new financial support for the rising star, purchasing a white fox cape for White to wear at performances. In 1945, she signed a contract with artist agency Columbia Concerts Incorporated. A three-month tour of Central and South America and the Caribbean followed in 1946, and she sang in France and Switzerland in 1948. White was the first Black Canadian concert singer to achieve international fame.

Vocal problems, an exhausting itinerary, and an eventual diagnosis of breast cancer later contributed to White's early retirement from public singing in 1952, and she settled in Toronto, where she studied with sopranos Gina Cigna and Irene Jessner at the Royal Conservatory of Music. White became a vocal instructor herself and taught both at Branksome Hall and privately. She went on to teach some of Canada's up-and-coming musical talent, and her students included singers Lorne Greene, Dinah Christie, Don Francks, Robert Goulet, Anne Marie Moss and Judith Lander. White appeared in Halifax for a few rare performances during the 50s; although she announced her intention to resume a full-time singing career, her return to the concert circuit never fully materialized.

In 1964, she sang in a command performance for Queen Elizabeth II and Prince Philip, at the opening of the Confederation Centre of the Arts in Charlottetown, Prince Edward Island. This was one of her last major concerts.

White died in Toronto of cancer on February 13, 1968, aged 56.

== Legacy and honours ==
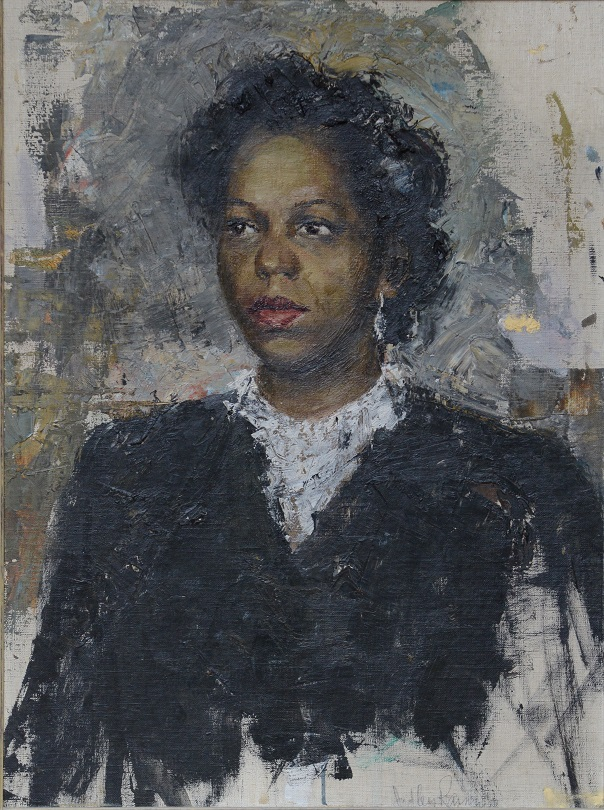
Portrait of Portia White by Hedley Rainnie on display at Government House, Nova Scotia

In 1944, White's supporters in Nova Scotia formed the Nova Scotia Talent Trust to provide her with financial assistance for her singing career. The Trust went on to establish annual scholarships for other Nova Scotian artists, and continues to award the Portia White Award to artists who show "exceptional commitment and potential in voice." The Nova Scotia provincial government also awards a Portia White Prize for "cultural and artistic excellence," and the 1998 inaugural Portia White Prize was awarded to Nova Scotian poet George Elliott Clarke, White's great nephew.

White has been declared a person of national historic significance by the Government of Canada, and she was featured in a special issue of Millennium postage stamps celebrating Canadian achievement. At the 2007 East Coast Music Awards, White was posthumously honoured with a Dr. Helen Creighton Lifetime Achievement Award. She is the namesake of Portia White Court, a Halifax street, as well as the Portia White Atrium in Citadel High School. In 2017, the Portia White Youth Award was established as part of the African Nova Scotian Music Awards. In 2022, Branksome Hall unveiled a plaque honouring White on its campus as part of a student-led commemorative ceremony, with guests George Elliott Clarke, singer Measha Brueggergosman-Lee, and White's niece, Sheila White, also in attendance.

White has been the subject of Lance Woolaver's play Portia White: First You Dream (also known simply as Portia), Sylvia Hamilton's documentary Portia White: Think on Me, and George Elliott Clarke's book Portia White.

A new opera entitled Aportia Chryptych: A Black Opera for Portia White by HAUI and Sean Mayes premiered in June 2024 and was produced by the Canadian Opera Company The show made history as the first time a black composer, librettist, stage director, ensemble have worked on the COC stage. The show took home the 45th Annual Dora Mavor Moore Award for Outstanding Ensemble and Outstanding New Musical/New Opera.

A portrait of White by Hedley Rainnie is on permanent display at Government House, Nova Scotia in honour of her contributions to the arts.

== Discography ==
- Think on Me (1968, White House Records) WH-6901
- Great Voices of Canada, Vol 5. White et al. Analekta AN 2 7806
- First You Dream (1999. C. White) W001-2
- Library and Archives Canada also holds audio recordings of White's live performances.

== See also ==
- Black Nova Scotians
- Music of Canada
