= 'Tis Autumn =

1941 jazz standard

Single by Les Brown and His Orchestra
- B-side: "That Solid Old Man (Is Here Again)"
- Released: September 17, 1949
- Genre: jazz standard
- Length: 3:10
- Label: Okeh
- Songwriter: Henry Nemo

'Tis Autumn is a 1941 jazz standard written by Henry Nemo. It was first recorded by Nat King Cole. It was first released by Les Brown and His Orchestra.

== Other recordings ==
- It was later recorded by Chet Baker several times, including his 1959 album Chet, and later with Bill Evans.
- Red Garland recorded it for his 1959 album All Kinds of Weather
- Jackie Paris recorded it for The Song Is Paris (1962).
- Joe Pass recorded it for several albums, including Simplicity (1967) *Checkmate (1981) and one with Ella Fitzgerald for their 1976 album Fitzgerald and Pass... Again.
- Redd Foxx (as Fred Sanford) and guest star Timmie Rogers sing it in the 1975 "Brother, Can You Spare an Act?" episode of Sanford and Son.
- American jazz singer Stacey Kent covered it for her 2003 album The Boy Next Door.
- It has also been covered by Stan Getz, Bruce Eskovitz, Carmen McRae, Lee Konitz, Spike Robinson, Bob Dorough, Eddie Higgins and Bennie Wallace.
