= Measha Brueggergosman-Lee =

Canadian opera singer

Measha Brueggergosman ONB
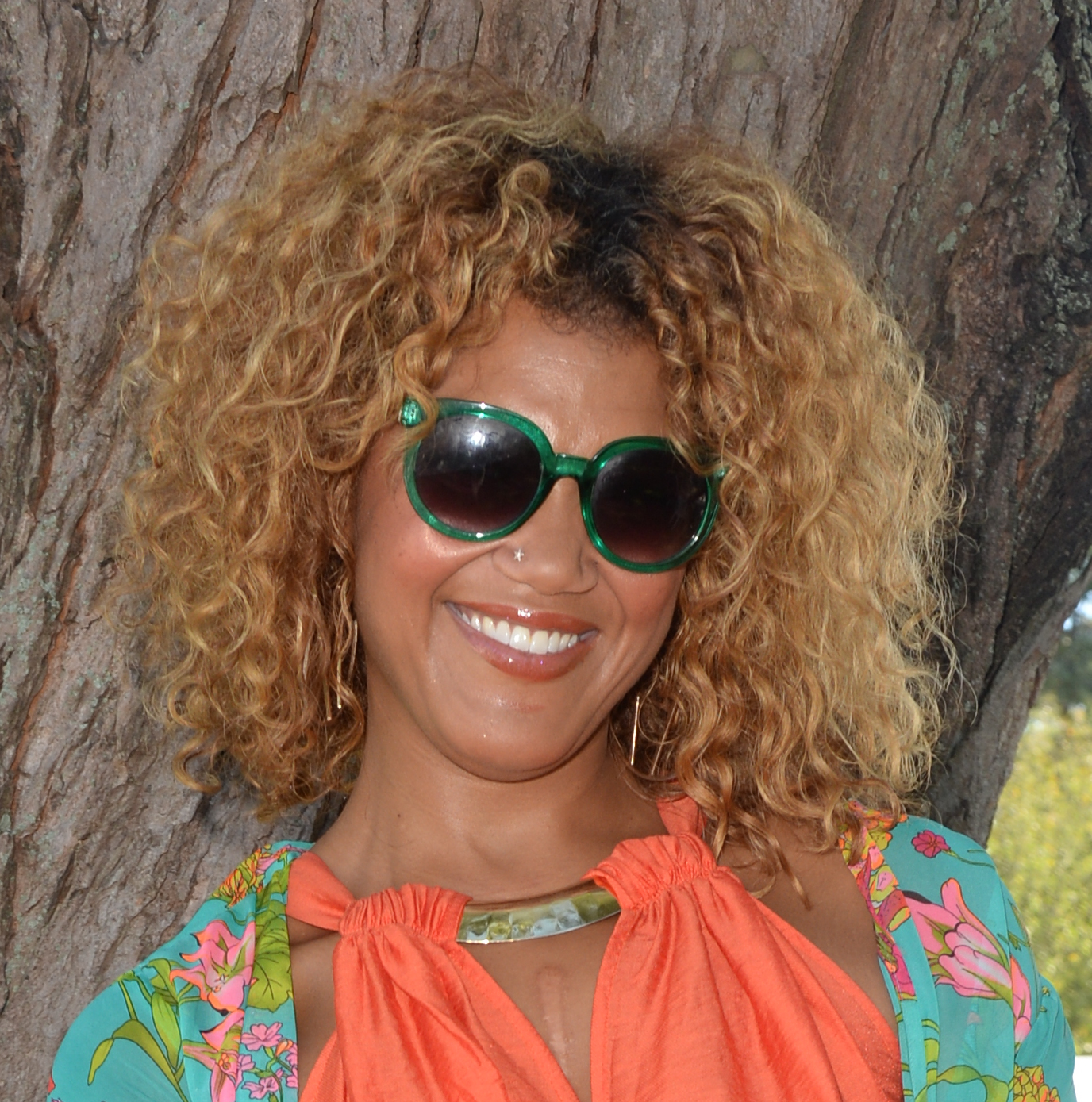
- Measha Brueggergosman at 2014 CFC Annual BBQ
- Born: Measha Gosman; June 28, 1977 (age 49); Fredericton, New Brunswick, Canada
- Occupations: Singer, stage actress
- Spouses: Markus Bruegger (m. 1999; div. 2018) Stephen Lee (m. 2021)
- Children: 2
- Website: www.measha.com

Measha Brueggergosman–Lee ONB (née Gosman; June 28, 1977) is a Canadian soprano who performs both as an opera singer and concert artist. She has performed internationally and won numerous awards. Her recordings of both classical and popular music have also received awards.

== Background ==
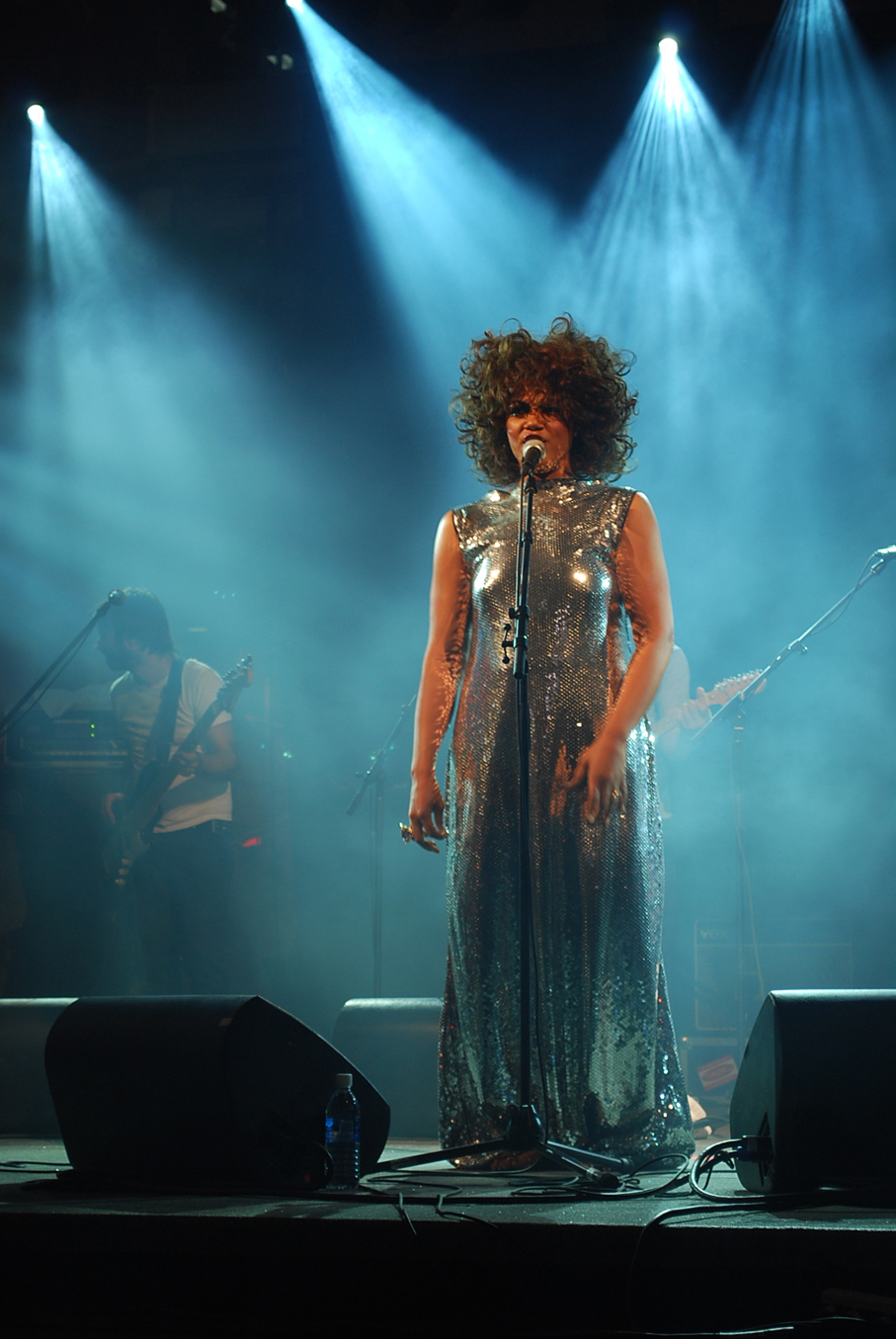
Measha Brueggergosman performing September 2009

She was born Measha Gosman in Fredericton, New Brunswick, to Anne Eatmon and Sterling Gosman. As a child, Gosman began singing in the choir of her local Baptist church, where her father served as a deacon. She studied voice and piano from the age of seven. As a teen, she took voice lessons in her home town, and spent summers on scholarships at the Boston Conservatory and at a choral camp in Rothesay, New Brunswick. She studied for one year with New Brunswick soprano Wendy Nielsen, before moving on to studies at the University of Toronto, where she obtained a B.Mus. She went to Germany for five years, where she pursued a Master's degree at the Robert Schumann Hochschule in Düsseldorf, Germany.

In 2007, Brueggergosman discovered her family's deep history in Canada and the United States. Her paternal 4x great-grandparents were John Gosman and his wife Rose, African Americans who each escaped from slavery in New England colonies during the American Revolution by going to British lines. John was from Connecticut and Rose from Rhode Island. They probably met in New York City, then occupied by the British. The British gave freedom to American slaves who left rebel slaveholders and sought refuge with them. Tens of thousands of slaves, mostly in the South, took advantage of the war's chaos to escape.

After the war, the British arranged transport to Nova Scotia for nearly 3500 Black Loyalists from the former Thirteen Colonies. John and Rose Gosman and their five-month-old daughter Fanny, born free in British lines, were recorded in the British embarkation record known as the Book of Negroes. They had a passage in 1783 on one of the last ships to leave New York for Nova Scotia. Measha's great-grandparents first lived in Shelburne, but later settled in Fredericton. Brueggergosman learned of her African-American roots on Who Do You Think You Are, a British-based program bought by the CBC. According to Y-DNA genetic testing of her brother, it is likely their direct-line paternal African ancestors came from the Bassa people of Cameroon.

== Career ==
At age 20, Brueggergosman played the lead in the premiere of the opera Beatrice Chancy by James Rolfe and George Elliott Clarke. Produced in Toronto in 1998, and in Nova Scotia the following year, the opera tells the story of a slave girl in 19th–century rural Nova Scotia who murders her abusive father, the man who is also her master. The opera and Brueggergosman were well received by critics and audiences. In 2000 it was filmed for the CBC.

Brueggergosman has appeared throughout Canada, where she has performed with the Toronto Symphony Orchestra, Montreal Symphony Orchestra, the Thunder Bay Symphony Orchestra and Music Director Geoffrey Moull, National Arts Centre Orchestra under the direction of Pinchas Zukerman, and at Roy Thomson Hall.

She has performed internationally, as well, in the United States, Germany and other nations. She was in Elektra, Dead Man Walking, and Turandot with the Cincinnati Opera. She has also performed the Verdi Requiem with Sir Andrew Davis and the Toronto Symphony Orchestra, as well as with Helmuth Rilling at the International Beethoven Festival in Bonn.

In 2002, she was the soprano soloist in the Canadian premiere of Krzysztof Penderecki's Credo, under the direction of its composer, and in the attendance of the then Governor General of Canada, Adrienne Clarkson.

In 2005, Brueggergosman was a soloist in recording William Bolcom's Songs of Innocence and Experience, which won three Grammy Awards, including Best Classical Album.

In July 2007 she was a new performer at the Royal Nova Scotia International Tattoo, singing in the 'Phantom of the Opera' medley and closing the show with "Ave Maria".

She has also performed in the United States, for instance in the fall of 2009 with the Saint Louis Symphony Orchestra, in their performance of Michael Tippett's oratorio A Child of Our Time.

She performed role of Jenny in Weill/Brecht Rise and Fall of the City of Mahagonny in 2010 in Madrid's Teatro Real.

She performed the Olympic Hymn at the Opening Ceremonies of the 2010 Winter Games. During NBC's broadcast of the opening ceremony, Bob Costas remarked to Matt Lauer, co-host of Today, as the two hosted it about Brueggergosman's performance of the Olympic Hymn: "That's a hymn for you, right there," and laughed. She performed an arrangement of the English sung version of the hymn in English and French to reflect Canada's official languages.

In 2012 Brueggergosman was a judge on the Canadian reality show Canada's Got Talent. The show was cancelled after one season but was revived in 2022.

She has also had acting roles in the Murdoch Mysteries episode "Murdoch at the Opera", and in the films Brown Girl Begins and The Young Arsonists.

In 2021 she created the symphonic short film Forgotten Coast, an exploration of Black Canadian history in Nova Scotia, for the National Arts Centre/CBC Gem series Undisrupted.

== Charitable activities ==
Brueggergosman is a member of the Canadian charity Artists Against Racism.

In 2007, Brueggergosman became the Goodwill Ambassador for the African Medical & Research Foundation (AMREF), a charity working for Better Health in Africa. In June of that year she travelled to the war-affected village of Patongo in East Africa to share her voice as a form of musical therapy for children. Brueggergosman described herself after the trip as "never the same" and continues her work with AMREF today.

== Personal life ==
She married Markus Brügger, born in Germany. They first met in high school, when he was an exchange student in New Brunswick. When they married, they combined their last names to Brüggergosman (also spelled Brueggergosman). They have two sons. They divorced in 2018. In 2021 she married jazz guitarist Steve Lee.

Suffering a heart condition in June 2009, Brueggergosman took some time off to recover from open heart surgery. She returned to the stage in September 2009 for a performance at the Toronto International Film Festival.

On June 20, 2019, Brueggergosman underwent another successful open heart surgery (double bypass) in Calgary.

== Awards and recognition ==
She was awarded the Grand Prize at the 2009 Jeunesses Musicales Montreal International Musical Competition and won First Prize at the International Vocal Competition 's-Hertogenbosch in 2002. Brueggergosman has been a prizewinner at other competitions, including the Wigmore Hall International Song Competition in London, the George London Foundation in New Deli, the Queen Sonja International Music Competition in Oslo, and the ARD International Music Competition in Munich.

The recipient of the Canada Council and Chalmers Performing Arts grants, Brueggergosman has been twice nominated for Juno Awards. She won the 2008 Juno Award for Classical Album of the Year: Vocal or Choral Performance for Surprise, recorded with Deutsche Grammophon, with which she has a contract.

In 2015, she appeared in the documentary television series Songs of Freedom, which profiled her exploring and learning about her African heritage leading up to a live concert performance of African-American spiritual music.

Brueggergosman has also appeared as a "judge" on MuchMusic's Video on Trial and on Slice TV's Project Runway Canada.

In 2017, she was appointed to the Order of New Brunswick, and received an honorary doctorate from Concordia University.

== Discography ==
| Year | Title | Works/Composers | Additional Artists | Record label Catalogue number |
|---|---|---|---|---|
| 2004 | So Much To Tell | Songs by Samuel Barber, Aaron Copland, and George Gershwin | Manitoba Chamber Orchestra; Roy Goodman, conductor | CBC Records SMCD 5234 |
| 2006 | Extase | Songs and Arias by Hector Berlioz and Jules Massenet | Orchestre Symphonique de Québec; Yoav Talmi, conductor | CBC Records SMCD 5236 |
| 2007 | Beethoven: Symphony No. 9 | Beethoven: Symphony No. 9 | Kelley O'Connor, Frank Lopardo, René Pape; The Cleveland Orchestra; Franz Welser-Möst, conductor The Cleveland Orchestra Chorus; Robert Porco, director | Deutsche Grammophon; 0289 477 7132 6 |
| 2008 | Surprise | Songs by William Bolcom, Erik Satie, and Arnold Schoenberg | William Bolcom, piano BBC Symphony Orchestra; David Robertson, conductor | Deutsche Grammophon; 0289 477 6589 9 |
| 2010 | Night and Dreams | Lieder by Brahms, Debussy, Duparc, Fauré, Liszt, Montsalvatge, Mozart, Poulenc, Schubert, R. Strauss, Wolf, et al | Justus Zeyen, piano | Deutsche Grammophon; 0289 477 8101 1 |
| 2010 | Wagner: Wesendonck-Lieder, Preludes & Overtures | Richard Wagner: Wesendonck Lieder, WWV 91 | The Cleveland Orchestra; Franz Welser-Möst, conductor | Deutsche Grammophon; 0289 477 8773 0 |
| 2012 | I've Got a Crush on You #90 CAN | Duets with Martin Short, David Myles, and Lennie Gallant | Covers from the songbooks of Feist, Joni Mitchell, Lennie Gallant, Cole Porter, and the Gershwins | Kelp Records KP 072 |
| 2014 | Christmas | Christmas songs | Aaron Davis, piano | Kelp Records |
