= The Song Is Paris =

Studio album by Jackie Paris
- Released: 1962
- Recorded: January 22, 24 & 26 and May 8, 1962
- Genre: Jazz
- Length: 32:53
- Label: Impulse!
- Producer: Bob Thiele

Jackie Paris chronology
Jackie Paris Sings the Lyrics of Ira Gershwin (1961)	The Song Is Paris (1962)	Changes Two (1974)

The Song Is Paris is an album by American jazz vocalist and guitarist Jackie Paris recorded in 1962 for the Impulse! label.

== Reception ==
The Allmusic review by Jason Ankeny awarded the album 4 stars stating "Because he was never a showy or self-indulgent vocalist, Paris never received the acclaim he deserved, and the subtlety of a record like The Song Is Paris further underlines just how deceptive his music can be – the album shifts so effortlessly between moods and tempos that its broad range threatens to pass by virtually unnoticed. Paris' nuanced, succinct approach to the material likewise eschews technical acrobatics in favor of sincerity and poignancy – slowly but surely, the songs work their way deep under your skin".

Professional ratings
Review scores
Source	Rating
Allmusic	4/5 stars
New Record Mirror	4/5 stars

== Track listing ==
1. "Duke's Place" (Duke Ellington) – 2:40
2. "If Love Is Good to Me" (Redd Evans, Fred Spielman) – 3:16
3. "Jenny" (Bobby Scott) – 3:23
4. "My Very Good Friend in the Looking Glass" (Robert Allen) – 2:54
5. "'Tis Autumn" (Henry Nemo) – 3:45
6. "Nobody Loses All the Time" (Scott) – 2:11
7. "Everybody Needs Love" (Phil Medley, Ray Passman) – 3:25
8. "Cherry" (Ray Gilbert, Don Redman) – 2:43
9. "Thad's Blues" (Thad Jones) – 3:33
10. "Tonight" (Leonard Bernstein, Stephen Sondheim) – 2:34
11. "Cinderella (Stay in My Arms)" (Jimmy Kennedy, Michael Carr) – 2:29

- Recorded in New York City on January 22, 1962 (tracks 2 & 3), January 24, 1962 (track 6), January 26, 1962 (tracks 1, 4 & 5) and May 8, 1962 (tracks 7–11)

== Personnel ==
- Jackie Paris – vocals, guitar
- Bill Hammond (tracks 1–5) – flute
- Phil Bodner – flute, alto saxophone, bass clarinet (tracks 1–6),
- George Dessinger – oboe, bassoon (tracks 1–5)
- Romeo Penque – tenor saxophone, flute (tracks 1, 4 & 5)
- Al DeRisi, Lew Gluckin, Marky Markowitz, Clyde Reasinger – trumpet (track 6)
- Paul Faulise, Phil Giacobbe, Dominick Gravine, Bill Schallen – trombone (track 6)
- Tom Alfano, Hal McKusick, John Murtaugh, Howard Rittner – reeds (track 6)
- Ray Alonge, Dick Berg, Art Cery, Don Corrado – French horn (tracks 1, 4 & 5)
- Hank Jones – piano (tracks 7–11)
- Arnold Eidus, Paul Gershman, Harry Lookofsky, Gene Orloff – violin (tracks 2 & 3)
- David Schwartz – viola (tracks 2 & 3)
- Charles McCracken – cello (tracks 2 & 3)
- Gloria Agostini (tracks 1–5), Janet Soyer (track 6) – harp
- Barry Galbraith – guitar (tracks 1–6)
- George Duvivier (track 1 & 4–11), Jack Lesberg (tracks 2 & 3) – bass
- Sol Gubin (tracks 1, 4 & 5), Roy Haynes (tracks 7–11), Maurice Marks (track 6), Ted Sommer (tracks 2 & 3) — drums
- Willard Dillon – percussion (track 6)
- Bobby Scott – arranger, conductor (tracks 1–6)
