= Truro, Nova Scotia =

Town in Nova Scotia, Canada

Truro
- Town
- Town of Truro
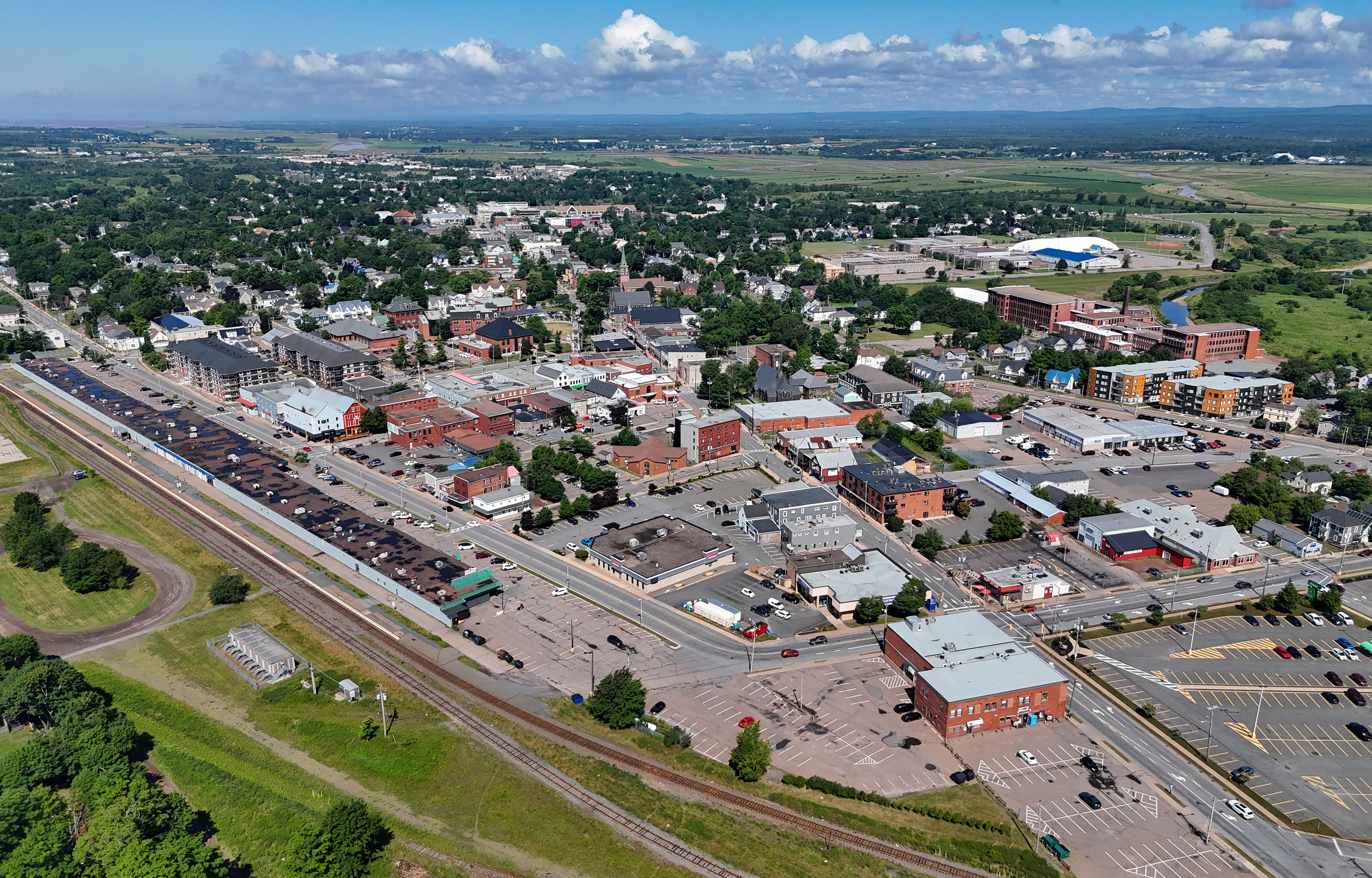
- Aerial view of Truro in 2025

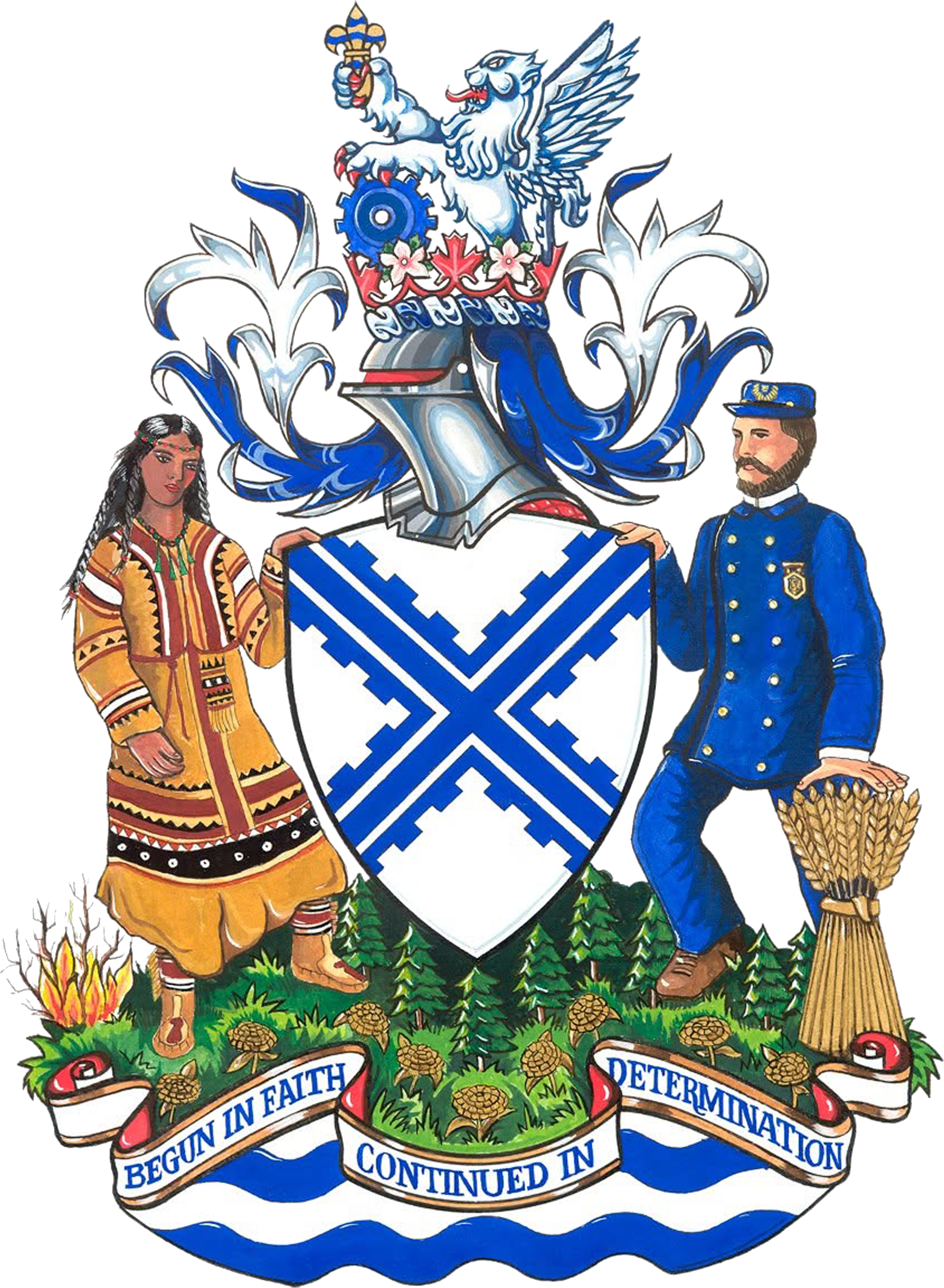
- Flag Seal
- Nickname: Hub of Nova Scotia
- Motto: Begun In Faith, Continued In Determination
- Location within Nova Scotia
- Coordinates: 45°21′53″N 63°16′48″W
- Country: Canada
- Province: Nova Scotia
- County: Colchester
- Founded: 1759
- Incorporated: May 6, 1875

Government
  - Body: Truro Town Council
  - Mayor: Cathy Hinton
  - MLA: Dave Ritcey (PC)
  - MP: Alana Hirtle (LPC)

Area (2021)
  - Town: 37.52 km^{2} (14.49 sq mi)
- Elevation: 19 m (62 ft)

Population (2021)
  - Town: 12,954
  - Density: 345.3/km^{2} (894/sq mi)
  - Urban 2021: 46,157
- Time zone: UTC-4 (AST)
  - Summer (DST): ADT
- Postal code span: B2N
- Area code(s): 902 & 782
- Telephone Exchanges: 902-305, 843, 890, 893, 895, 896, 897, 898, 899, 956, 957, 986
- Highways: Hwy 104 (TCH); Hwy 102; Trunk 2 Trunk 4 Route 236; Route 311
- Median household income (2020): $54,800
- Total private dwellings: 6,658
- NTS Map: 11E6 Truro
- GNBC Code: CBMKT
- Website: truro.ca

Truro (Scottish Gaelic: Trùru) is a town in central Nova Scotia, Canada. Truro is the shire town of Colchester County and is located on the south side of the Salmon River floodplain, close to the river's mouth at the eastern end of Cobequid Bay.

== History ==
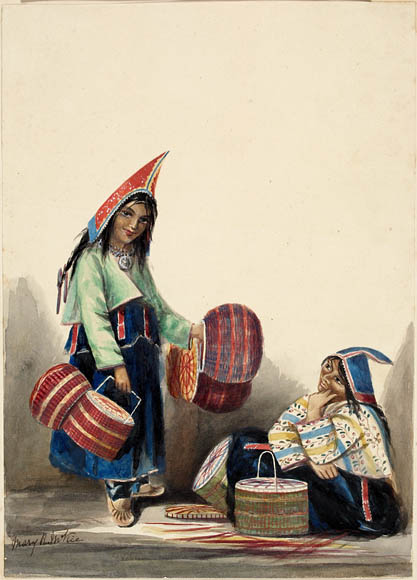
Mi'kmaq women selling baskets

The area has been home to the Mi'kmaq people for several centuries. The Mi'kmaq name for the Truro area, "Wagobagitik" means "end of the water's flow". Mi'kmaq people continue to live in the area at the Millbrook and Truro reserves of the Millbrook – We'kopekwitk band.

Acadian settlers came to this area in the early 1700s. The Mi'kmaq name for the Truro area was shortened by the settlers to "Cobequid", and the bay to the west of the town is still named Cobequid Bay. By 1727, the settlers had established a small village near the present downtown site of Truro known as "Vil Bois Brule" (Village in the burnt wood). Many Acadians in this region left in the Acadian Exodus which preceded the Expulsion of the Acadians in 1755. In 1761, the British settled the area with Presbyterians of predominantly Ulster Scottish origin who came from Ireland via New England. They named the new settlement after the city of Truro in Cornwall, United Kingdom.

Originally a small farming community, the construction of the Nova Scotia Railway between Halifax, and Pictou in 1858 caused the municipality to experience a fast rate of growth which increased even more when the railway connected to central Canada in 1872 and became the Intercolonial Railway. The Intercolonial, which later became the Canadian National Railway built a large roundhouse and rail yard in Truro. Further rail links to Cape Breton and to the Annapolis Valley through the Dominion Atlantic Railway in 1905 increased the town's importance as a transportation hub for Nova Scotia. The railway also attracted industries such as the Truro Woolen Mills in 1870 (which later became Stanfield's) and provincial institutions like the provincial Normal School (later the Nova Scotia Teachers College) and the Nova Scotia Agricultural College. The town officially incorporated in 1875. Many figures from the town's past were featured in over 40 tree sculptures which were carved in tree trunks after Truro lost most of its Elm trees to Dutch Elm Disease in the 1990s. As of 2018, most of these sculptures were suffering from severe deterioration and were taken down. The history of the town and surrounding county is preserved at the Colchester Historical Museum (c.1900-1901), which is designated under the provincial Heritage Property Act.

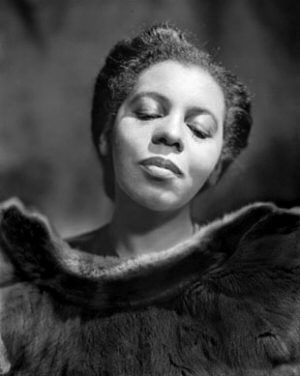
Opera and Gospel singer, Portia White

Three areas of Truro contain many African Nova Scotian residents. The residents of Upper/Lower Ford Street (“the Marsh”) are descendants of Black Loyalists and Black Refugees. Young Street (“the Hill”) has people from a number of different cultural and ethnic diversities. Black Loyalist descendants make up the vast majority of people in the third area, West Prince Street (“the Island”). Many of Truro's black community has roots in the historically important Black Nova Scotian settlements of Guysborough County. Zion United Baptist Church, first founded in 1896 on Prince Street, has long been the spiritual heart of the community.

Truro is also the birthplace of world-renowned contralto, Portia White (1911–1968). To support herself while taking music lessons at the Maritime Conservatory of Performing Arts she taught school in Africville and Lucasville. Her national debut occurred in 1941 at the Eaton Auditorium in Toronto, and her international debut came at the Town Hall in New York in 1944. She gave a Command Performance for Queen Elizabeth II at the opening of Confederation Centre in Charlottetown in 1964. A monument commemorating Portia White stands on the grounds of the Zion United Baptist Church.

A number of other prominent Black Canadians have roots in the town. One of Canada's most well known civil rights leader, Burnley Allan "Rocky" Jones, was raised in "the Marsh" neighbourhood of Truro. Art Dorrington, the first black hockey player to sign an NHL contract was raised in "the Island".

== Infrastructure and attractions ==
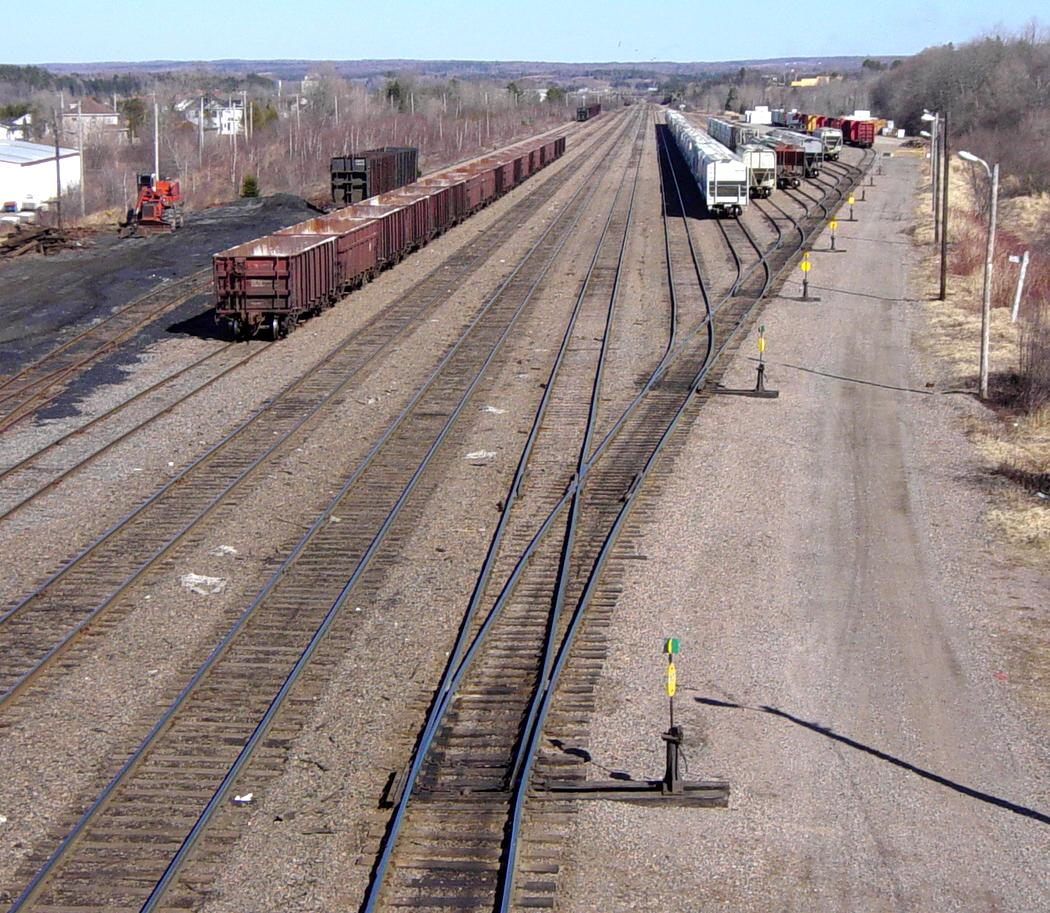
Truro railyards at the junction of the CN & CB&CNSR lines, 2006.

Truro is known as the Hub of Nova Scotia as it is located at the junction between the Canadian National Railway, running between Halifax and Montreal, and the Cape Breton and Central Nova Scotia Railway, running between Truro and Port Hawkesbury. Until the 1980s, Truro also hosted a junction between the Canadian National and Canadian Pacific Railway's former Dominion Atlantic Railway line running through Windsor and down the Annapolis Valley to Yarmouth, Nova Scotia.

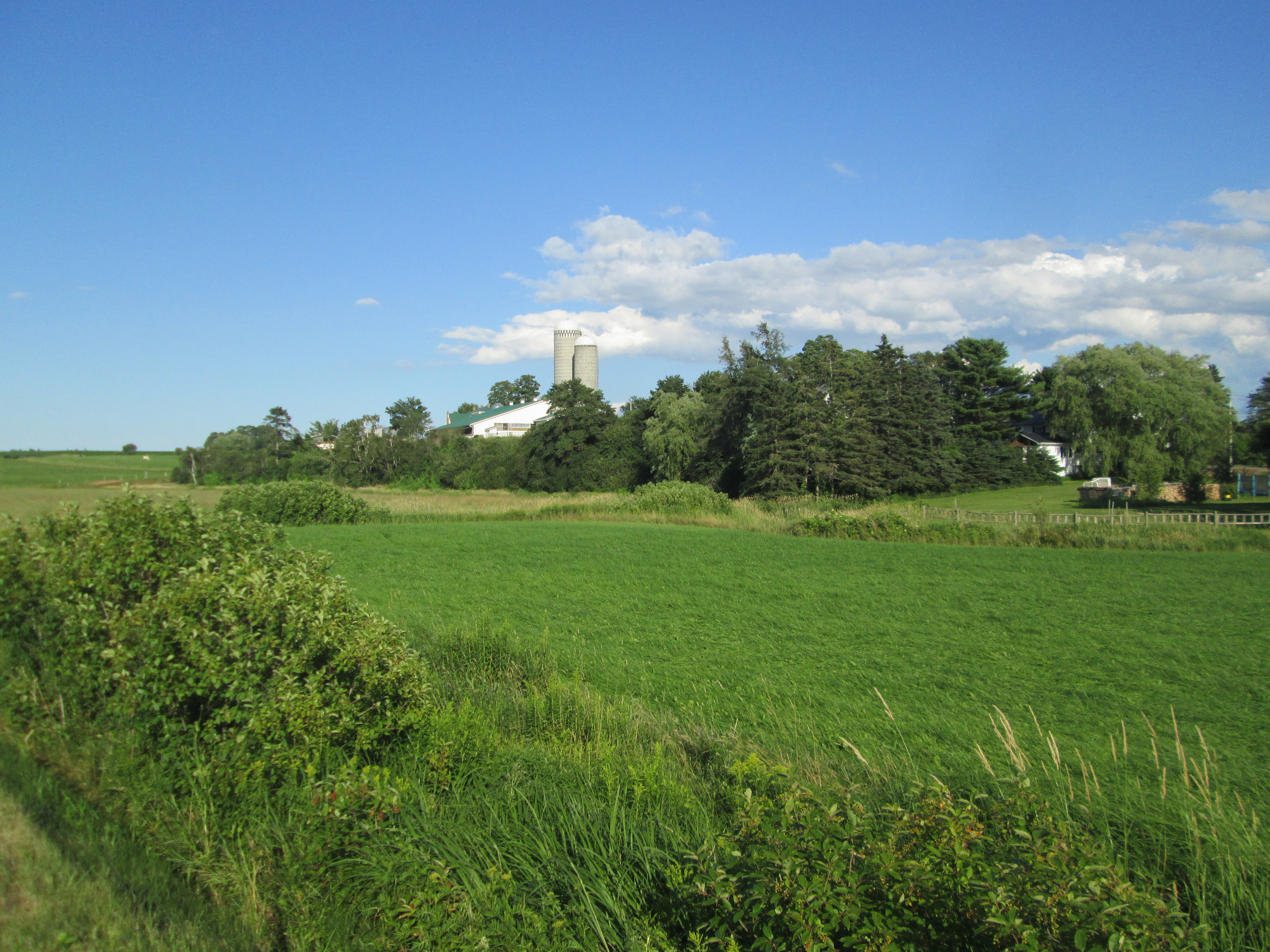
View from Cobequid Trail, 2015

An important highway interchange is located just north of Truro in the rural community of Onslow where Highway 102 ends at Highway 104 - both four lane expressways. Secondary roads Trunk 2 and Trunk 4 intersect in the town. Important tertiary roads Route 236 and Route 311 end in the nearby communities of Lower Truro and Onslow respectively. Some of these roads also form part of the Glooscap Trail which is a scenic drive for tourists. Truro railway station is served by Via Rail's Ocean line.

Nova Scotia Power has several transmission line corridors in or near Truro; additionally Bell Aliant, EastLink and 360networks route most of the major telephone and data communications lines in the province through the town.

Six large sections of the Berlin Wall are located along the Cobequid Trail, on the Agricultural Campus of Dalhousie University.

Victoria Park, a 3,000-acre (12 km^{2}) municipal woodland park located near the centre of the town is a popular local destination. Victoria Park features stands of old-growth forest characteristic of the New England–Acadian forests, particularly groves of old eastern hemlock. The park features many hiking trails, which showcase the property's woodland and several waterfalls. Victoria Park is also a popular mountain biking destination, featuring several trails and built infrastructure specifically designated for the sport.

Truro is home to The Hub Shopping Centre, formerly known as the Truro Mall.

== Education ==
Truro has two public high schools, Cobequid Educational Centre and the francophone École acadienne de Truro. Post-secondary institutions consist of a campus of the Nova Scotia Community College, Jane Norman College (formerly the Institute of Human Services Education), and the Agricultural Campus of Dalhousie University in the neighbouring village of Bible Hill.

== Sports ==
Truro has three ice hockey rinks: Deuvilles Rink, Rath Eastlink Community Centre, and the Colchester Legion Stadium. Truro is home to the Truro Bearcats, a Junior "A" ice hockey team who are four time MJAHL Champions. (Canadian) Football is also a popular sport in the town with all games being played on Friday night at the Truro Amateur Athletic Club (TAAC) grounds. Truro Raceway conducts harness races every Sunday. Truro is also home to a rugby club, which hosts the World Indoor Sevens Rugby Championships.

Truro also has a senior baseball team, the Truro Senior Bearcats, that play in the Nova Scotia Senior Baseball League. Their home field is at the Truro Amateur Athletic Club (TAAC).

Lacrosse has become a very popular sport in Truro over the recent years. There is a minor lacrosse association, the Truro Bearcats Lacrosse Association, which allows youth to take part in organized lacrosse teams and games. As well, there is a junior A lacrosse team, the Mi'Kmaq Warriors, that plays in the East Coast Junior Lacrosse League. They play in the summer months out of the Colchester Legion Stadium.

== Notable people ==
- Sir Adams George Archibald, Father of Confederation
- Jane Archibald, operatic soprano
- Nora Bernard, Mi'kmaq activist
- Cory Bowles, actor/dancer/musician
- David Brine, former NHL ice hockey player Florida Panthers
- Jenny Brine, retired CWHL ice hockey player
- Matt Brouwer, gospel singer guitarist
- Lyle Carter, retired National Hockey League goaltender (originally from Brookfield)
- Bob Champoux, retired National Hockey League goaltender
- Jocelyne Couture-Nowak, French language instructor who established the École acadienne de Truro, but was shot and killed in the 2007 Virginia Tech massacre
- Glenn V. Davidson, Retired Naval Officer. Recipient of an Honorary Doctorate of Civil Laws from University Kings College.
- Martin Henry Dawson, led pioneering research into DNA and penicillin, found the cure for Subacute Bacterial Endocarditis
- Fred Dickson, Harper appointed member of the Senate of Canada (originally from Glace Bay)
- J. Chalmers Doane, famous music teacher
- Melanie Doane, singer
- Art Dorrington, first Black hockey player to sign an NHL contract
- Jeff Douglas, actor (Joe of I Am Canadian) and broadcast presenter
- Johan Edlund, vocalist and guitarist of Tiamat (band)
- Dylan Ehler, missing boy who disappeared in 2020
- John Gray, playwright
- Harry Hampton, Scottish-American golf professional
- A. J. B. Johnston, historian and novelist
- Burnley "Rocky" Jones, political activist
- Jeremiah "Jerry" Jones, soldier
- Chet Koneczny, professional lacrosse player
- Brett Lauther, CFL player
- Mary Florence MacDonald, curator
- Lewis MacKenzie, retired Major-General
- Sandy MacKenzie, professional (ice) hockey player
- Greg Maddison, deputy Chief of the Defence Staff
- Jon McIsaac, professional (ice) hockey referee
- Leo McKay Jr., Novelist
- Justin Palardy, professional Canadian football player
- Doug Rogers, Olympian and flag bearer for Canada at the 1972 Olympics.
- Melissa Ann Shepard, Criminal
- Zach Sill, professional (ice) hockey player
- George Isaac Smith, 18th Premier of Nova Scotia (1967–1970); appointed by Prime Minister Pierre Trudeau to the Senate of Canada (originally from Stewiacke, Nova Scotia)
- Barry Stagg, singer-songwriter/playwright/musician
- Robert Stanfield, politician
- Bill White, composer/politician/social activist
- Jack White, labour union activist / politician
- Portia White, singer
- William A. White, church minister and father to Bill, Jack and Portia
- Lenore Zann, actress and politician

== Climate ==
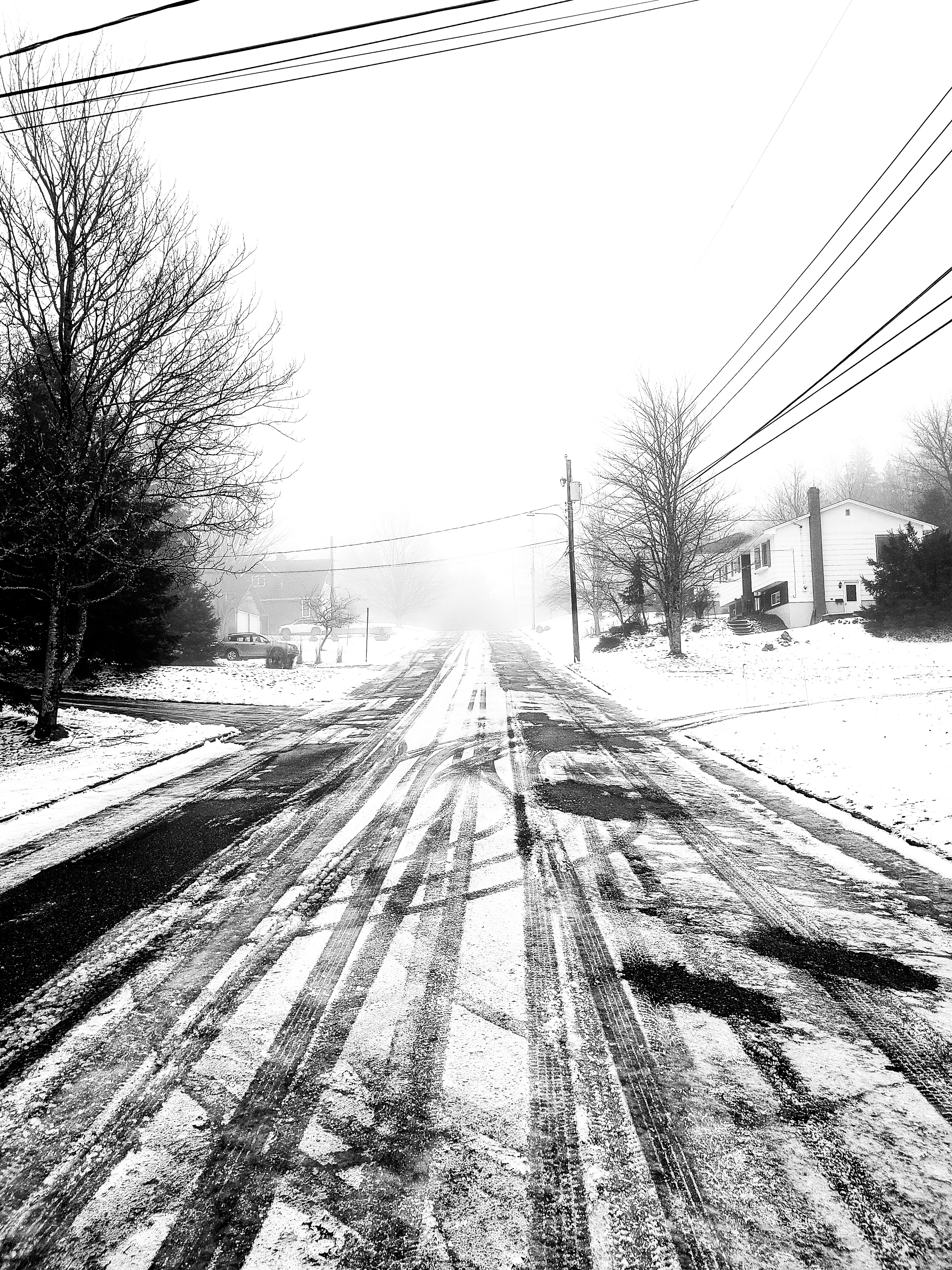
Winter, 2018

Truro has a humid continental climate (Köppen climate classification Dfb) similar to the vast majority of The Maritimes with warm, wet summers and cold, snowy winters.

The highest temperature ever recorded in Truro was 35.6 °C (96 °F) on 19 August 1935 and 15 August 1944. The coldest temperature ever recorded was −38.3 °C (−37 °F) on 22 January 1934.

Climate data for Truro, 1981–2010 normals, extremes 1873–present (Note: Climate data was recorded at Truro from January 1873 to August 1915, at Truro NSAC from January 1910 to April 2005 and at Debert from December 2003 to present.)
Month	Jan	Feb	Mar	Apr	May	Jun	Jul	Aug	Sep	Oct	Nov	Dec	Year
Record high °C (°F)	17.2 (63.0)	17.0 (62.6)	20.0 (68.0)	27.2 (81.0)	30.6 (87.1)	33.0 (91.4)	33.9 (93.0)	35.6 (96.1)	33.1 (91.6)	26.5 (79.7)	22.2 (72.0)	17.8 (64.0)	35.6 (96.1)
Mean daily maximum °C (°F)	−1.4 (29.5)	−0.7 (30.7)	3.1 (37.6)	9.1 (48.4)	16.0 (60.8)	20.8 (69.4)	24.1 (75.4)	23.7 (74.7)	19.4 (66.9)	13.2 (55.8)	7.2 (45.0)	1.5 (34.7)	11.3 (52.3)
Daily mean °C (°F)	−6.9 (19.6)	−6 (21)	−1.8 (28.8)	4.2 (39.6)	10.0 (50.0)	14.8 (58.6)	18.4 (65.1)	18.0 (64.4)	13.7 (56.7)	8.0 (46.4)	3.1 (37.6)	−3.2 (26.2)	6.0 (42.8)
Mean daily minimum °C (°F)	−12.4 (9.7)	−11.3 (11.7)	−6.6 (20.1)	−0.7 (30.7)	4.1 (39.4)	8.8 (47.8)	12.8 (55.0)	12.3 (54.1)	8.1 (46.6)	2.7 (36.9)	−1.1 (30.0)	−7.9 (17.8)	0.7 (33.3)
Record low °C (°F)	−38.3 (−36.9)	−35.6 (−32.1)	−31.1 (−24.0)	−23.9 (−11.0)	−7.2 (19.0)	−4.4 (24.1)	0.0 (32.0)	−1.1 (30.0)	−7.2 (19.0)	−12.2 (10.0)	−21.1 (−6.0)	−34.4 (−29.9)	−38.3 (−36.9)
Average precipitation mm (inches)	114.6 (4.51)	90.5 (3.56)	104.2 (4.10)	84.8 (3.34)	94.5 (3.72)	92.8 (3.65)	85.2 (3.35)	79.6 (3.13)	103.5 (4.07)	104.5 (4.11)	115.0 (4.53)	114.0 (4.49)	1,183.1 (46.58)
Average rainfall mm (inches)	62.7 (2.47)	47.4 (1.87)	65.8 (2.59)	69.6 (2.74)	92.8 (3.65)	92.8 (3.65)	85.2 (3.35)	79.6 (3.13)	103.5 (4.07)	104.5 (4.11)	103.2 (4.06)	72.5 (2.85)	979.5 (38.56)
Average snowfall cm (inches)	55.1 (21.7)	45.4 (17.9)	40.7 (16.0)	16.3 (6.4)	1.7 (0.7)	0.0 (0.0)	0.0 (0.0)	0.0 (0.0)	0.0 (0.0)	0.0 (0.0)	12.4 (4.9)	43.1 (17.0)	214.7 (84.5)
Average precipitation days (≥ 0.2 mm)	15.6	12.3	12.9	13.2	15.3	15.1	13.1	13.8	15.3	16.1	16.7	15.9	175.2
Average rainy days (≥ 0.2 mm)	6.4	5.2	7.1	10.5	15.3	15.1	13.1	13.8	15.3	16.1	14.5	8.2	140.4
Average snowy days (≥ 0.2 cm)	11.1	9.3	7.7	4.1	0.24	0.0	0.0	0.0	0.0	0.0	3.5	9.2	45.1
Mean monthly sunshine hours	77.9	98.0	114.6	141.7	191.8	203.8	225.3	210.3	148.5	122.5	71.3	62.6	1,668.3
Percentage possible sunshine	27.5	33.5	31.1	35.0	41.6	43.6	47.6	48.1	39.4	36.0	24.8	22.9	35.9
Source: Environment Canada

== Demographics ==
Historical population
Year	Pop.	±%
1762	120	—
1871	2,114	+1661.7%
1881	3,461	+63.7%
1891	5,012	+44.8%
1901	5,993	+19.6%
1911	6,017	+0.4%
1921	7,592	+26.2%
1931	7,901	+4.1%
1941	10,272	+30.0%
1951	10,756	+4.7%
1956	12,250	+13.9%
1961	12,421	+1.4%
1971	13,047	+5.0%
1976	12,840	−1.6%
1981	12,552	−2.2%
1986	12,124	−3.4%
1991	11,683	−3.6%
1996	11,938	+2.2%
2001	11,457	−4.0%
2006	11,765	+2.7%
2011	12,059	+2.5%
2016	12,261	+1.7%
2021	12,954	+5.7%

In the 2021 Census of Population conducted by Statistics Canada, Truro had a population of 12,954 living in 6,347 of its 6,658 total private dwellings, a change of 5.7% from its 2016 population of 12,261. With a land area of 37.52 km^{2} (14.49 sq mi), it had a population density of 345.3/km^{2} (894.2/sq mi) in 2021.

Canada 2016 Census		Population	% of Total Population
Visible minority group Source:	Black	490	4.2%
Visible minority group Source:	South Asian	115	1%
Visible minority group Source:	Filipino	85	0.7%
Visible minority group Source:	Chinese	75	0.6%
Visible minority group Source:	Other and mixed visible minority	95	0.8%
Total visible minority population		860	7.3%
Aboriginal group Source:	First Nations	355	3%
Aboriginal group Source:	Other Aboriginal or self identified	240	2%
Total Aboriginal population		595	5.1%
European Canadian		10,280	87.6%
Total population		11,735	100%

== See also ==
- List of municipalities in Nova Scotia
