= James Rolfe (composer) =

Canadian composer of contemporary music (born 1961)

- Birth name: James Simon Rolfe
- Born: 23 July 1967 (age 58); Ottawa, Ontario, Canada
- Genres: Contemporary, chamber, orchestral, opera
- Occupation: Composer

James Simon Rolfe (born 1961) is a Canadian composer of contemporary music.

== Early life and education ==
Rolfe was born in Ottawa, Ontario. He studied composition with John Beckwith at the University of Toronto and Jo Kondo in Japan.

== Career ==
Rolfe was the President of the Canadian League of Composers (2007–11) and has won awards for his music, most recently the 2006 Jules Léger Prize for New Chamber Music and the 2009 SOCAN Jan V. Matejcek New Classical Music Award. Rolfe lives in Toronto with his wife Juliet Palmer, who is also a composer.

== Operas ==
Although Rolfe's chamber, vocal, orchestral, and piano works are widely performed, he has become most noted for his operas. Beatrice Chancy, an opera set in Nova Scotia during the 19th century (libretto by George Elliott Clarke), was produced in 1998 by Toronto's Queen of Puddings Music Theatre Company and was subsequently filmed for television by the Canadian Broadcasting Corporation in 2000. Rolfe has since composed the children's opera Elijah’s Kite (libretto by Camyar Chai), which explores bullying among children, and was co-produced by Tapestry New Opera Works and the Manhattan School of Music in New York City in 2006; Rosa (libretto by Camyar Chai), produced by Tapestry in Toronto in 2004; Swoon (libretto by Anna Chatterton), produced by the Canadian Opera Company in 2006; Orpheus and Euridice in 2003 (libretto by André Alexis) and Aeneas and Dido in 2007 (libretto by André Alexis). The last two works were both commissioned and produced by Toronto Masque Theatre as companion pieces to Marc-Antoine Charpentier's Descent of Orpheus to the Underworld and Henry Purcell's Dido and Aeneas. In February 2009 Rolfe's opera Inês (with libretto by Paul Bentley) was produced and performed in Toronto by the Queen of Puddings Music Theatre Company. Based on the story of the 14th century Galician Inês de Castro, it featured fado singer Inês Santos as the lead character. Rolfe is currently composing a new opera for the Canadian Opera Company with librettist Anna Chatterton.

== Awards ==
- Guggenheim Fellowship (2000)
- K. M. Hunter Music Award (2003)
- Louis Applebaum Composers Award (2005)
- Jules Léger Prize for New Chamber Music (2006)

== Other selected compositions ==
- Idiot Sorrow (1990)
- Simon & Garfunkel & The Prophets of Rage (1993)
- Ears, Nose and Throat, (1994)
- Revenge! Revenge!! Revenge!!! (1995)
- Squeeze (1997)
- Mechanical Danny (2000)
- Six Songs (text by Walt Whitman) (2001)
- Worry (2001)
- raW (2003)
- Flourish (2005)
- Breathe (2011)
