= Rojo (Red Garland album) =

Studio album by The Red Garland Trio
- Released: Late May/Early June 1961
- Recorded: August 22, 1958
- Studio: Van Gelder Studio, Hackensack, New Jersey
- Genre: Jazz
- Length: 41:03
- Label: Prestige; PRLP 7193
- Producer: Bob Weinstock

The Red Garland Trio chronology
| Can't See for Lookin' (1958) | Rojo (1961) | The Red Garland Trio (1958) |

Professional ratings
Review scores
| Source | Rating |
|---|---|
| Allmusic | 4/5 stars |
| The Penguin Guide to Jazz Recordings | 3/4 stars |

Rojo is an album by jazz pianist Red Garland, released in 1961 on Prestige Records, featuring tracks recorded on August 22, 1958. Oscar Peterson, commenting on the track "Darling, Je Vous Aime Beaucoup" in 1961, criticized Garland's left-hand playing, saying: "I found this very, very monotonous. [...] primarily it's that drone-type left hand, punctuated with chords, that he used invariably".

== Track listing ==
1. "Rojo" (Garland) - 8:54
2. "We Kiss in a Shadow" (Rodgers, Hammerstein II) - 6:47
3. "Darling Je Vous Aime Beacoup" (Anna Sosenko) - 5:14
4. "Ralph J. Gleason Blues" (Garland) - 6:43
5. "You Better Go Now" (Bickley Reichner, Irvin Graham) - 5:11
6. "Mr. Wonderful" (Weiss, Bock, Holofcener) - 8:14

== Personnel ==
- Red Garland - piano
- George Joyner - double bass
- Charlie Persip - drums
- Ray Barretto - congas
