= Manteca (album) =

Studio album by The Red Garland Trio
- Released: 1958
- Recorded: April 11, 1958; Van Gelder Studio, Hackensack, New Jersey
- Genre: Jazz
- Length: 39:58 original LP; 47:16 CD reissue
- Label: Prestige; PRLP 7139
- Producer: Bob Weinstock

Red Garland chronology
It's a Blue World (1970)	Manteca (1958)	Can't See for Lookin' (1963)

Professional ratings
Review scores
Source	Rating
AllMusic	3/5 stars
The Penguin Guide to Jazz Recordings	3/4 stars

Manteca is an album by jazz pianist Red Garland, released in 1958 on Prestige Records. The CD reissue included a bonus track recorded during the same session.

== Track listing ==
1. "Manteca" (Dizzy Gillespie, Chano Pozo, Gil Fuller) – 8:07
2. "S'Wonderful" (Gershwin, Gershwin) – 6:42
3. "Lady Be Good" (Gershwin, Gershwin) – 5:50
4. "Exactly Like You" (Dorothy Fields, Jimmy McHugh) – 7:08
5. "Mort's Report" (Garland) – 12:11
6. "Portrait of Jenny" (Gordon Burdge, J. Russel Robinson) – 7:18 Bonus track on CD reissue

== Personnel ==
- Red Garland - piano
- Paul Chambers - double bass
- Art Taylor - drums
- Ray Barretto - congas
