= Can't See for Lookin' =

Studio album by Red Garland
- Released: Late 1963
- Recorded: June 27, 1958
- Studio: Van Gelder Studio, Hackensack, New Jersey
- Genre: Jazz
- Length: 35:05
- Label: Prestige; PRLP 7276
- Producer: Bob Weinstock

Red Garland chronology
Manteca (1958)	Can't See for Lookin' (1963)	Rojo (1961)

Professional ratings
Review scores
Source	Rating
AllMusic	3/5 stars
The Penguin Guide to Jazz Recordings	3/4 stars

Can't See for Lookin' is an album by jazz pianist Red Garland, recorded in 1958 but not released until 1963 on Prestige Records.

== Track listing ==
1. "I Can't See for Lookin'" (Nat King Cole [as 'Nadine Robinson'], Arnold 'Dok' Stanford) – 9:28
2. "Soon" (George & Ira Gershwin) – 6:56
3. "Blackout" (Avery Parrish, Sammy Lowe) – 8:56
4. "Castle Rock" (Ervin Drake, Jimmy Shirl, Al Sears) – 9:45

== Personnel ==
- Red Garland – piano
- Paul Chambers – double bass
- Art Taylor – drums
