= George and Rue =

2005 novel by George Elliott Clarke

- First edition cover
- Author: George Elliott Clarke
- Publisher: HarperCollins Canada
- Publication date: December 27, 2004
- ISBN: 978-0-002-25539-4

George and Rue is a novel by Canadian writer George Elliott Clarke, published in 2005 by HarperCollins Canada.

The novel is based on the true story of George and Rufus Hamilton, two Black Canadian brothers who murdered a taxicab driver in Barker's Point, New Brunswick in 1949. Later the same year, both of the brothers were convicted of murder and executed. Clarke, whose mother was the Hamilton brothers' cousin, uses a mixture of historical record and creativity to imagine the brothers' lives and to seek understanding of what led them to commit murder.

Clarke's earlier poetry book, Execution Poems (2001), contains poetry inspired by the same case, much of which was originally intended for publication in George and Rue.
