= Anthony Sherwood =

Canadian actor

- Born: 1949 (age 76–77); Halifax, Nova Scotia, Canada
- Occupations: Actor, producer, director, writer
- Years active: 1974-present
- Relatives: Portia White (cousin)
- Website: anthonysherwood.com

Anthony Sherwood (born 1949) is a Canadian actor, filmmaker and activist. He has been active in film, television, and theatre productions since his film debut in 1979. On television he is known for his role as Jason Locke on season four of Airwolf (1987), and as Dillon Beck on Street Legal (1989–94). The latter role earned him a Gemini Award nomination for Best Supporting Actor in a Drama Program or Series.

Sherwood is the founder of a namesake production company, specializing in productions emphasizing issues of social justice and African-Canadian history and culture. From 1992 until 2001, he was the national co-chairman of the March 21 Campaign for the federal government of Canada.

In 2022, he received the Queen Elizabeth II Platinum Jubilee Medal.

== Early life ==
A Black Nova Scotian, Sherwood was born in the Africville neighborhood of Halifax in 1949. Sherwood's grandmother, Alice Kane (née Alice White), was a musician and music teacher, his mother was an amateur singer, and his first cousin once-removed was Canadian opera singer, Portia White, Canada's first African Canadian opera singer.

Sherwood's family moved to Montreal, where he grew up in the neighborhood of Little Burgundy, which has a strong Black Canadian tradition. Sherwood commenced an eight-year career as a R&B singer before switching focus to acting.

== Career ==
=== Acting ===
He has acted in both Canadian and American feature films and television series and received several awards for his work in the entertainment industry.

Sherwood began his acting career on stage and started in musical theatre in Montreal starting in 1975. He starred in such stage musicals as Ain't Misbehavin', Cabaret, and The Music Man. He began acting in several Canadian and American feature films starting in 1979.

In 1986, he joined the cast of the American television series, Airwolf, playing the role of Jason Locke during the fourth and final season. In 1989, Sherwood played the role of Dillon Beck in the CBC Television series, Street Legal. He portrayed this role on Street Legal from 1989 to 1994 and was nominated in 1992 for a Gemini Award Best Performance by an Actor in a Supporting Role.

He has guest-starred in a variety of television shows including: Beauty & The Beast, Single Ladies, Lost Girl, The Art of More, The Listener, Aaron Stone, Being Erica, Due South, Outer Limits, Soul Food, Earth: Final Conflict, PSI Factor, 1-800 Missing, Danger Bay, Adventure Inc., Diamonds, Alfred Hitchcock Presents, Night Heat, The Best Years, The New Ghostwriter Mysteries, and Counterstrike.

Sherwood has appeared in feature films, including; Race (2015), Star Spangled Banners (2013), Honey (2003), Hostile Takeover (1988), Deadbolt (1992), Undue Influence, Switching Channels, Eddie & the Cruisers II: Eddie Lives, Closer and Closer, Crimes of Fashion, Terror Train, Too Close to Home, Free of Eden, Ultimate Deception, Both Sides of The Law, Mail To The Chief, Threshold, Physical Evidence and Guilty as Sin (1993).

In 2009, Sherwood returned to the stage performing in the role of Marty in the musical Dreamgirls at the Grand Theatre in London, Ontario. In 2015, he performed the title role in Othello for Ale House Theatre.

=== Writing, producing and directing ===
In 1991, Sherwood formed his production company, Anthony Sherwood Productions, that specialized in productions emphasizing issues of social justice and African-Canadian history and culture.

His film company produced the feature documentary Honour Before Glory (2001), which he wrote, produced and directed. The film won second prize at the 2002 Hollywood Black Film Festival in Los Angeles and a 2002 Gemini Award.

Sherwood created and produced the documentary film Music - A Family Tradition for the CBC, which won a Gemini Award in 1997 and was nominated for an International Emmy Award.

He also produced and directed a documentary film entitled Nowhere to Run, which looks at the global crisis of landmines. His film Mozambique – A Land of Hope looks at the HIV/AIDS epidemic in Africa and was broadcast on the Signature Series on OMNI Television and was featured at the World AIDS Conference in Toronto in August 2006. His documentary film 100 Years of Faith is about the oldest black church in the province of Quebec. In 2009, he produced and directed the documentary film Knocking On Heaven's Door, which looked at the gang violence in Kingston, Jamaica.

From 1993 to 2000, Sherwood was the host and narrator of the documentary television series Forbidden Places for the Discovery Channel. On this television series, he performed numerous duties including writer, director, narrator and host. From 2002 to 2005, he was the host of the television talk-show In The Black for OMNI Television, the first talk-show on Canadian television featuring exclusive interviews with prominent African-Canadians.

In February 2010, Sherwood wrote, directed and produced an educational play on great African-Canadian hero William Hall. In 2012, Sherwood wrote and directed the stage play TITANIC: The Untold Story, which was produced to commemorate the 100th anniversary of the sinking of the Titanic. The play had its world premiere at the Alderney Landing Theatre in Nova Scotia. In July 2016, Sherwood wrote, directed and co-produced the play, "The Colour of Courage" which commemorated the 100th anniversary of the formation of Canada's all-black military unit in WWI.

In March 2015, Sherwood released his first novel, Music In The Dark, which is published by Pottersfield Press.

== Social activism ==
From 1992 to 2001, Sherwood was national co-chairman of the March 21 Campaign for the federal government of Canada. March 21 is the International Day For the Elimination of Racism. Sherwood has received international recognition and awards for his efforts in raising awareness to the importance of racial equality.

On July 9, 2022, Anthony Sherwood served as Master of Ceremonies for the Government of Canada's official apology to the Black soldiers of No. 2 Construction Battalion and their descendants. The apology was delivered by Prime Minister Justin Trudeau.

== Awards and honours ==
- 1998: Martin Luther King Jr. Achievement Award
- 1998: Brampton Arts Acclaim Award
- 2000: Urban Alliance on Race Relations Award
- 2002: African-Canadian Achievement Award
- 2006: North American Black Historical Museum & Cultural Centre Award
- 2006: Planet Africa Award
- 2008: Harry Jerome Award
- 2022: Queen Elizabeth II Platinum Jubilee Medal

== Filmography ==
=== Film ===
- 1979: City on Fire – Sam
- 1980: Agency – Lou Cardoza
- 1980: Death Ship – Seaman No. 2
- 1980: Terror Train – Jackson
- 1981: Dirty Tricks – Soundman
- 1981: Scanners – Scanner in Attic
- 1982: Killing 'em Softly
- 1983: Utilities – Social Services Man #1
- 1985: Eternal Evil – Jensen
- 1986: The Vindicator – Detective
- 1986: The Morning Man
- 1987: Wild Thing – Will
- 1988: Switching Channels – Carvalho
- 1988: Hostile Takeover – Garlas
- 1989: Physical Evidence – Lou
- 1989: Eddie and the Cruisers II: Eddie Lives! – Hilton Overstreet
- 1993: Guilty as Sin – Agent Ken Powell
- 2003: Honey – Mr. Daniels
- 2017: Christmas Inheritance – Uncle Zeke
- 2018: The Holiday Calendar – Santa from 'Christmas Inheritance'

=== Television ===
Anthony Sherwood television credits
Year	Title	Role	Notes	Ref.
1984	The Guardian	Mr. Chambers	TV movie	
1986	Philip Marlowe, Private Eye	Reno	1 episode	
1986	Spearfield's Daughter	Phil Rainer	Miniseries	
1987	First Offender	Unknown	TV movie	
1987	Airwolf	Jason Locke	Season 4	
1988	Alfred Hitchcock Presents	Det. Simon	1 episode	
1988	T and T	Boone	1 episode	
1987–1988	Shades of Love: Midnight Magic	Peter Shank	TV movie	
1988	Spies, Lies & Naked Thighs	Dobson	TV movie	
1987–1988	Night Heat	Fleming / Kilman	3 episodes	
1988	9B	Joe Wevers	1 episode	
1989	Danger Bay	Dr. Richard Granger	1 episode	
1990	Counterstrike	Jackson	Episode: "Dead in the Air"	
1990	Counterstrike	Robert	Episode: "Regal Connection"	
1991	Beyond Reality	Elliot	1 episode	
1992	Deadbolt	Detective Toren	TV movie	
1993	Secret Service	Hamilton	1 episode	
1989–1994	Street Legal	Dillon Beck	Regular role	
1995	Kurt Vonnegut's Harrison Bergeron	TV Announcer - Florida	TV movie	
1996	Closer and Closer	FBI Agent Luther Clay	TV movie	
1996	Due South	Frank Greco	1 episode	
1996	Undue Influence	Charles Franklin	TV movie	
1996	F/X: The Series	Agent Cairns	1 episode	
1996	Jack Reed: Death and Vengeance	Unknown	TV movie	
1997	Too Close to Home	Cop Gillespie	TV movie	
1997	The New Ghostwriter Mysteries	Mr. Canin	1 episode	
1998	Black Harbour	Brady Fraserl	1 episode	
1998	Free of Eden	Frank	TV movie	
1998	PSI Factor: Chronicles of the Paranormal	Dr. Eric Thomas	1 episode	
1998	Earth: Final Conflict	Lincoln Auger	1 episode	
1999	Ultimate Deception	Granger	TV movie	
1999	The Outer Limits	Hank Dell	1 episode	
2000	Mail to the Chief	Moderator #3	TV movie	
2001	Soul Food	Carl Thomas	1 episode	
2002	Adventure Inc.	Governor Morton	1 episode	
2003	Threshold	Dr. Thaddeus Owens	TV movie	
2003	1-800-Missing	Gregory Dayton	1 episode	
2004	The L Word	Roger	1 episode	
2004	Crimes of Fashion	Senior FBI Agent	TV movie	
2009	The Best Years	Unknown	1 episode	
2010	Aaron Stone	President	1 episode	
2011	Being Erica	Gus	1 episode	
2013	The Listener	Martin Reynolds	1 episode	
2013	Star Spangled Banners	Dr. Lloyd	TV movie (aka Banner 4th of July)	
2015	Single Ladies	Admiral Aguilera	1 episode	
2015	Beauty & the Beast	Detective O'Hara	1 episode	
2015	Lost Girl	Light Fae Elder #1	2 episodes	
2015	The Art of More	Darnell Griffin	1 episode	
2016	The Girlfriend Experience	Garrett Stern	2 episodes	
2017	Conviction	Judge Trumble	1 episode	
2017	Taken	Marcus Flynn	1 episode	
2018	Crawford	Lieutenant Grady	4 episodes	
2020	Christmas Unwrapped	Martin Jones	TV movie	
2021	The Clue to Love	Dennis Mitchell	TV movie	
2023	Accused	Emmett Stone	1 episode	
2024	Plan B	Robert Coleman	TV miniseries	
2024	A Season to Remember	Willie Gibson	TV movie	
