= Walter Ostrom =

Canadian ceramic artist

Walter Ostrom CM (born 1944) is a Canadian ceramic artist.

== Life ==
He was born in Binghamton NY and is a graduate of Ohio University. He has been a professor of Ceramics at NSCAD University since 1969.

== Work ==
His work has been featured in collections and exhibitions worldwide, including the Canadian Museum of Civilization and the Victoria and Albert Museum, London. Ostrom lives in Lunenburg, Nova Scotia.

== Awards ==
- Portia White Prize (2008)
- Invested as a Member of the Order of Canada by Governor General Michaëlle Jean (2007)
- Saidye Bronfman Award for Outstanding Creativity in Craft (2003)
- Jean A. Chalmers National Craft Award (1995)
