= École acadienne de Truro =

Location
- 50, rue Aberdeen; Truro, Nova Scotia, B2N 5B6; Canada
- Coordinates: 45°21′41″N 63°15′40″W

Information
- School type: High School
- Founded: 1997
- School board: Conseil scolaire acadien provincial
- Administrator: Monique Cormier
- Principal: Anne Bastarache
- Grades: Preschool to 12
- Language: French
- Newspaper: Les P'tites Nouvelles
- Website: eat.ednet.ns.ca
- Last updated: February 23, 2010

École acadienne de Truro is a Canadian francophone public school in Truro, Nova Scotia. It is operated by Conseil scolaire acadien provincial. Created in 1997, the École acadienne de Truro was the first francophone public school in central Nova Scotia.
