= Bill White (Canadian politician) =

Canadian activist and first Black candidate for federal office

William Andrew White
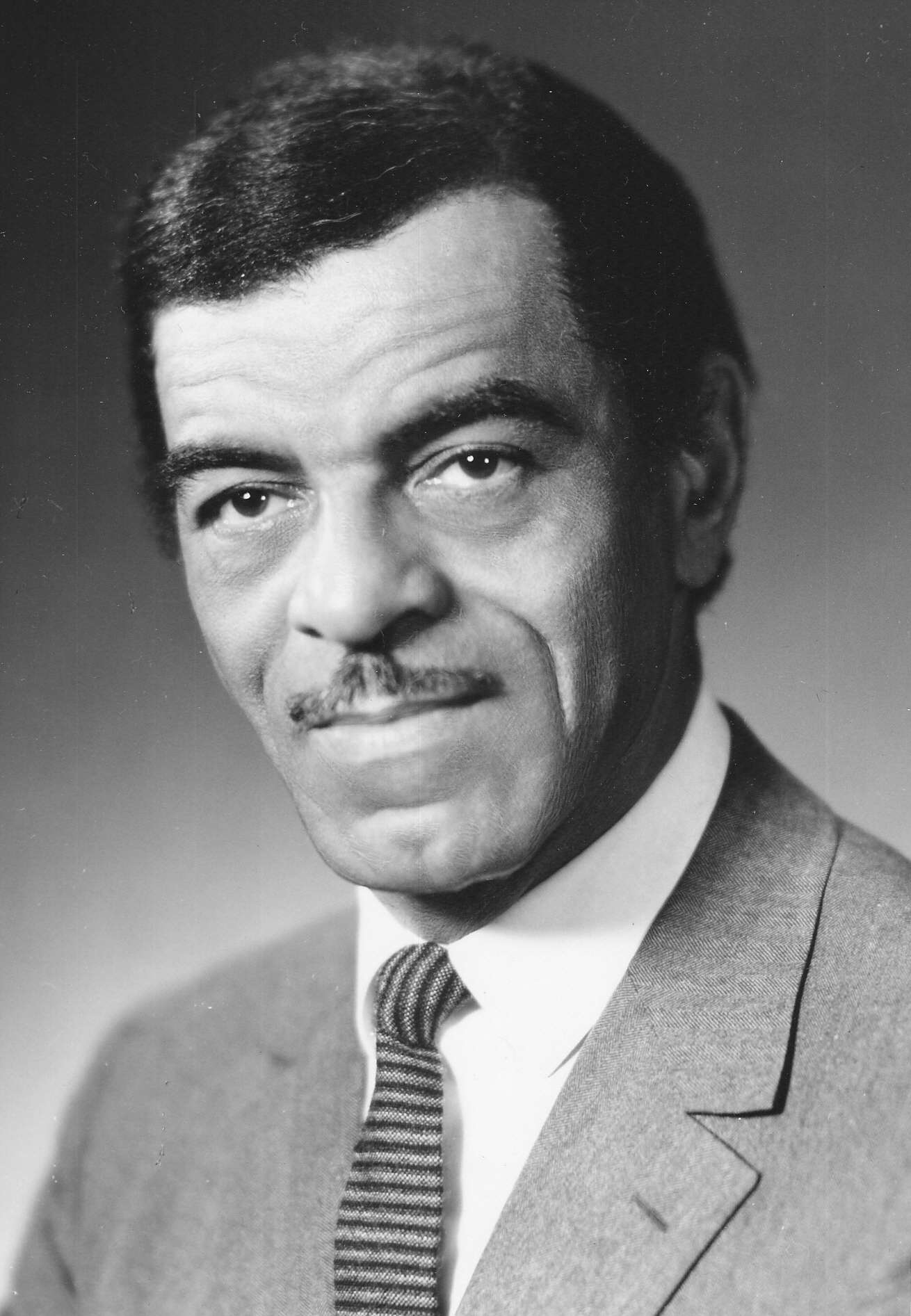
- Bill White, seen here in the mid-1970s. Photo courtesy of the White family.

Personal details
- Born: February 7, 1915 Truro, Nova Scotia, Canada
- Died: January 23, 1981 (aged 65) New Zealand
- Party: Co-operative Commonwealth Federation
- Spouse: Vivian R. Keeler
- Children: W. Romney White, Chris White, Laurie White, Sheila White, Tim White
- Occupation: Teacher, Composer, Choral Group Leader

William Andrew White, III, OC (February 7, 1915 – January 23, 1981) was a Canadian composer and social justice activist, who was the first Black Canadian to run for federal office in Canada.

== Family and education ==
He was born on 7 February 1915 in Truro, Nova Scotia, the son of Baptist minister William A. White and his wife Izie Dora White. (Note: Izie Dora White was both her maiden name and married name, through an unrelated family of the same name.) Among his twelve siblings included internationally renowned Canadian concert singer Portia White, labour union leader and politician Jack White, and television performer Lorne White. He was also the uncle of Donald H. Oliver, the first black male to sit in the Senate of Canada, through one of his sisters.

His family moved to Halifax where his father was minister of Cornwallis Street Baptist Church for nearly 20 years. After attending local schools, he got an education and music degree. He taught music. He was also a composer and choral group leader.

== Marriage and family ==
Bill White married Vivian Keeler, a white woman with roots in Nova Scotia, in 1947 in Toronto, after meeting in Halifax in 1944. They had five children together, including social activist and author Sheila White, software designer W. Romney White, folk musician Chris White, Toronto physician Laurie White, and professional musician Tim White.

== 1949 federal election ==
White stood as the Co-operative Commonwealth Federation candidate in the Toronto electoral district of Spadina in the 1949 election, becoming the first Black Canadian to run for federal office. He lost to the incumbent Liberal MP.

1949 Canadian federal election: Spadina
Party	Candidate	Votes
Liberal	David Croll	23,652
Progressive Conservative	Willard M. Box	9,407
Co-operative Commonwealth	William Andrew White	5,969
Source(s) "General Election Profile — 1949-06-27". Parliament of Canada. Archived from the original on 23 December 2024.

== Order of Canada ==
Bill White was appointed an Officer of the Order of Canada on December 18, 1970. He was invested into the Order on March 31, 1971. The appointment was for "services to the community and his contribution to better relations and understanding between people of different racial background." Another honour he earned was the Scarborough Citizen of the Year in 1976.

== Death ==
Bill White died in New Zealand on January 23, 1981, local time (January 23 in Toronto's Eastern Time Zone).

== See also ==
- Black Nova Scotians
- Electoral firsts in Canada
