= Red in Blues-ville =

Studio album by Red Garland
- Released: First week of September 1959
- Recorded: April 17, 1959
- Studio: Van Gelder Studio, Hackensack, New Jersey
- Genre: Jazz
- Length: 42:28
- Label: Prestige; PRLP 7157
- Producer: Esmond Edwards

Red Garland chronology
All Kinds of Weather (1958)	Red in Blues-ville (1959)	Coleman Hawkins with the Red Garland Trio (1959)

Professional ratings
Review scores
Source	Rating
AllMusic	4/5 stars
The Penguin Guide to Jazz Recordings	3/4 stars

Red in Blues-ville is an album by jazz pianist Red Garland, recorded in 1959 and released the same year on Prestige Records.

== Track listing ==
1. "He's a Real Gone Guy" (Lutcher) – 5:13
2. "See See Rider" (Traditional) – 8:00
3. "M Squad (Theme)" (Basie) – 7:36
4. "Your Red Wagon" (DePaul, Jones, Raye) – 5:51
5. "Trouble in Mind" (Jones) – 5:49
6. "St. Louis Blues" (Handy) – 9:59

== Personnel ==
- Red Garland – piano
- Sam Jones – double bass
- Art Taylor – drums
