= Anne Marie Moss =

Canadian jazz vocalist and music educator

Anne Marie Moss (February 6, 1935 – February 29, 2012) was a Canadian-born jazz vocalist and music educator.

She was born in Toronto, Ontario. She did not study music formally except for some lessons on breath control from Portia White. Moss began performing at a young age.

During the early 1950s, she performed in Toronto with groups led by American pianists Calvin Jackson and Joey Masters. She also sang with big bands led by Ron Collier, Ferde Mowry and Benny Louis and appeared on variety shows on CBC television. From 1956 to 1958, she toured in the United States and Canada with saxophonist Don Thompson. In 1959, she joined the big band of Maynard Ferguson. Moss also performed with the Count Basie Orchestra, Rob McConnell and the Boss Brass, Phil Nimmons, Moe Koffman and the Bernie Senensky Trio. For a time, she replaced Annie Ross in the vocal trio Lambert, Hendricks & Ross.

She married Jackie Paris in 1961 and began performing and touring with him. In 1980, she began performing as a solo artist again. The couple divorced in the late 1980s. Moss gave private voice classes. In 1987, she began teaching at the Manhattan School of Music. Her students included Roseanna Vitro, Judi Silvano and Jane Blackstone.

Moss died in 2012 at the age of 77 from undisclosed causes.

== Selected recordings ==
- Live at the Maisonette, with Jackie Paris (1974)
- Don't You Know Me? (1981)
