= Beatrice Chancy =

Canadian chamber opera

Beatrice Chancy is a Canadian chamber opera in four acts composed by James Rolfe. The libretto by George Elliott Clarke is based on his verse play of the same name. The opera was premiered in Toronto on 18 June 1998 by the Queen of Puddings Music Theatre Company with Measha Brueggergosman in the title role.

Based on Percy Bysshe Shelley's play The Cenci, which was itself based on the true story of Beatrice Cenci, the opera transplants the story from 16th century Italy to the Annapolis Valley of Nova Scotia in the 19th century. In this adaptation, Beatrice is the multiracial daughter of Francis Chancy, a brutish white slave owner, and Mafa, a Guinean slave woman who was raped by Francis. After Francis forces Beatrice into an incestuous encounter in a monastery, Beatrice and Mafa conspire to murder him.

The opera was reprised in Toronto and Halifax in 1999, and in Edmonton in 2001, again with Brueggergosman in the title role, and filmed for television by the Canadian Broadcasting Company. 4
