= The Red Garland Trio =

Studio album by Red Garland
- Released: 1960
- Recorded: November 21, 1958
- Studio: Van Gelder Studio, Hackensack, NJ
- Genre: Jazz
- Label: Moodsville; MVLP 6

Red Garland chronology
| Rojo (1958) | The Red Garland Trio (1960) | All Kinds of Weather (1958) |

Professional ratings
Review scores
| Source | Rating |
|---|---|
| Allmusic | 2/5 stars |

The Red Garland Trio (also referred to as Moodsville Volume 6) is an album by pianist Red Garland recorded in 1958 and released on the Moodsville label in 1960.

== Reception ==
Allmusic awarded the album 2 stars stating "Its slow tempos fit well into the theme of that subsidiary's releases but it resulted in the set being a bit sleepy... the lack of variety makes this reissue one of Red Garland's lesser efforts.

== Track listing ==
1. "I Love You Yes I Do" (Sally Nix & Henry Glover) – 6:17
2. "Blues for Ann" – 7:40
3. "I'll Never Stop Loving You" (Nicholas Brodszky) – 6:30
4. "And the Angels Sing" (Ziggy Elman, Johnny Mercer) – 6:47
5. "'Tain't Nobody's Bizness If I Do" (Porter Grainger, Everett Robbins) – 7:59
6. "Bass-ment Blues" (Red Garland) – 7:56

== Personnel ==
- Red Garland - piano
- Paul Chambers - bass
- Art Taylor - drums
