= Honour Before Glory =

2001 documentary film by Anthony Sherwood

- Directed by: Anthony Sherwood
- Written by: Anthony Sherwood
- Produced by: Anthony Sherwood
- Starring: Anthony Sherwood
- Music by: Victor Davies
- Release date: November 6, 2001
- Running time: 67 minutes
- Country: Canada
- Language: English

Honour Before Glory is a Canadian docudrama film, directed by Anthony Sherwood and released in 2001. Based on the personal diaries of William A. White, Sherwood's great uncle, the film portrays the history of the No. 2 Construction Battalion, Canada's first all-Black Canadian military unit, which was deployed during World War I but faced significant problems caused by racism.

Sherwood himself plays White in dramatic reenactments.

The film was broadcast by CBC Television on November 6, 2001. It has seen frequent followup screenings for Black History Month, other Black Canadian cultural events, and Remembrance Day ceremonies.

In 2023, Telefilm Canada announced that the film was one of 23 titles that will be digitally restored under its new Canadian Cinema Reignited program to preserve classic Canadian films.
