= Laurie Swim =

Canadian visual artist (born 1949)

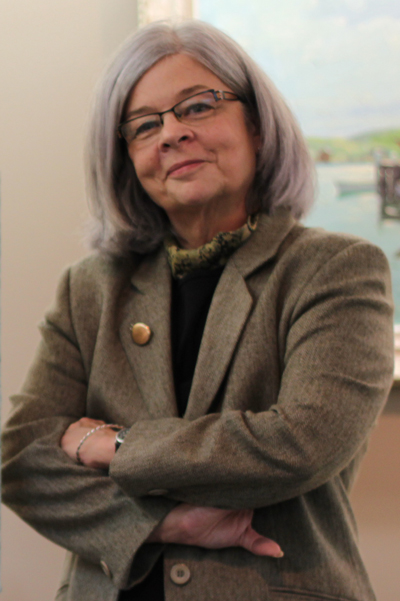
- Born: Laurie Elizabeth Swim; 1949 (age 75–76); Lockeport, Nova Scotia, Canada
- Education: Nova Scotia College of Art and Design; Mount Allison University
- Known for: Quilt art
- Notable work: Eve's Apple (1976); In the Gut (2010); Breaking Ground (2000)
- Awards: Portia White Prize
- Website: www.laurieswim.com

Laurie Swim (born 27 February 1949) is a Canadian visual artist, best known for her quilt art. Her work can be found in the permanent collections of the New York Museum of Arts and Design, the Nova Scotia Art Bank, the Nova Scotia Designer Crafts Council, the Ontario Workers Arts and Heritage Centre, and in private collections. She won the Portia White Prize in 2013.

== Biography ==
Swim was born in Lockeport, Nova Scotia, Canada and grew up in Nova Scotia. She studied painting at Mount Allison University and NSCAD University (Nova Scotia College of Art and Design) where she graduated 1972, before apprenticing with Danish designers Lisbeth Have and Annette Juel. She returned to Nova Scotia in 1975 but moved to Toronto, Ontario, in 1978, making art quilts for corporate and private collections. In 2004 she established The Art Quilt Gallery of the Atlantic, in Lunenburg, Nova Scotia.

== Solo work ==
- Eve's Apple (1976), 104″ x 96″. Awarded best in show at the first annual Nova Scotia Designer Crafts Council Juried Exhibition in 1976.
- From Our Backyard (1997)
- Magic Hour, Blue Rocks (2005)
- In the Gut (2010)
- Make-and-Break (2010), designated as "outstanding significance and national importance" by the Canadian Cultural Property Export Review Board in 2014.
- Time Goes By (2015)
- Hope and Survival (2017)

== Collaborative work ==
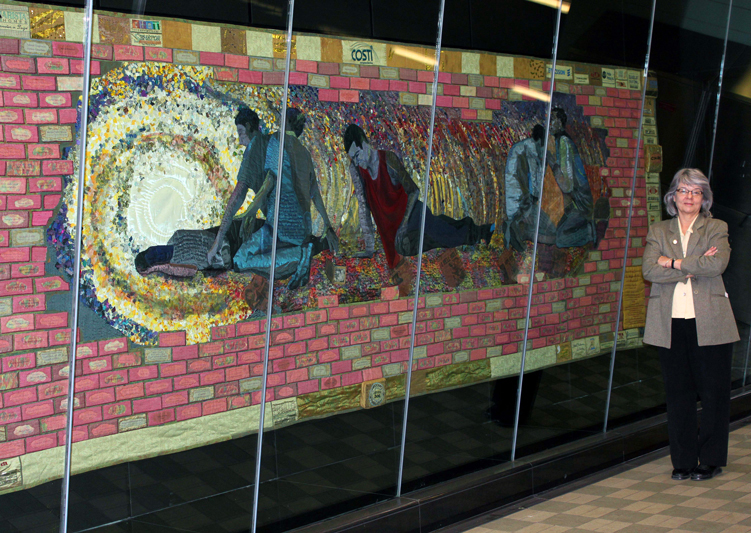
Breaking Ground - The Hoggs Hollow Disaster, 1960 (2000)

- Pulling Together, The Builders of The Rideau Canal, 1826-1832 (1995), 9′ × 15′, created in collaboration with the support of the Ontario Arts Council; part of the permanent collection of the Workers Art and Heritage Centre in Hamilton, Ontario, Canada.
- Lost at Sea, 1961 (2000), a fisherman's memorial housed in the Community Center of Lockeport, Nova Scotia.
- Breaking Ground — The Hogg's Hollow Disaster, 1960 (2000), 7ʻ × 20ʻ, hangs in the York Mills (TTC) subway station, Toronto.
- The Canadian Young Worker's Memorial Quilt (2003) supported by Ontario Federation of Labour.
- The Lunenburg Heritage Quilt (2003), created for the town of Lunenburg, Nova Scotia for its 250th anniversary. The work hangs at The Fishermen's Memorial Hospital.
- Hope and Survival, The Halifax Explosion Memorial Quilt for the 2017 centenary of the Halifax Explosion. The artist wrote and illustrated a children's book Hope and Survival: A story of the Halifax Explosion using elements from the quilt for the illustrations.

== Books ==
- The Joy of Quilting (1984), with an introduction by Alex Colville.
- Quilting (1991).
- Rags to Riches: The Quilt as Art (2007), with an introduction by the artist Mary Pratt.
- Hope and Survival: A story of the Halifax Explosion (2017), a children's book and work of historical fiction

== Awards ==
- 2013 Portia White Prize, Nova Scotia's highest award for Artistic Excellence and Contribution to the community.
- 2013 Dorothy MacMurdie Award, for outstanding contribution to Canadian Quilting.
- 2009 designated a Master Artisan by the Nova Scotia Designer Crafts Council.
