= Deadbolt (film) =

1992 film by Douglas Jackson

- Genre: Thriller
- Written by: Mara Trafficante; Frank Rehwaldt
- Directed by: Douglas Jackson
- Starring: Justine Bateman; Adam Baldwin; Chris Mulkey; Michele Scarabelli
- Music by: Milan Kymlicka
- Country of origin: Canada
- Original language: English

Production
- Executive producer: Pierre David
- Producers: Franco Battista; Tom Berry
- Cinematography: Rodney Gibbons
- Editor: Yves Langlois
- Running time: 95 min
- Production companies: Allegro Film Productions Inc. Image Organization

Original release
- Network: CBS
- Release: October 16, 1992

Deadbolt is a 1992 made-for-television psychological thriller film, by Douglas Jackson, and starring Justine Bateman and Adam Baldwin.

== Plot ==
When medical student Marty Hiller (Justine Bateman) places an ad for a roommate, her ad is answered by handsome, clean-cut Alec Danz (Adam Baldwin). At first Alec seems to be a wonderful roommate; supportive, considerate and a real friend. However, Alec's affection turns to obsession as he plots to manipulate and control all aspects of Marty's life, imprison her in her own apartment and make her his.

== Cast ==
- Justine Bateman as Marty Hiller
- Adam Baldwin as Alec Danz
- Michele Scarabelli as Theresa Velez
- Cindy Pass as Diana
- Chris Mulkey as Jordan
- Colin Fox as Professor Rhodes
- Amy Fulco as Michelle
- Ellen David as Lani
- Griffith Brewer as Beason
- Mark Camacho as Phil
- Isabelle Truchon as Linda
- Anthony Sherwood as Detective Toren
