= Jackie Paris =

American jazz musician (1924–2004)

- Born: Carlo Jackie Paris; September 20 1924; Nutley, New Jersey, United States
- Died: June 17 2004 (aged 79)
- Genre: Jazz
- Occupations: Singer, musician
- Instruments: Guitar, vocals
- Years active: 1940s–2000s
- Formerly of: The Jackie Paris Trio,

Carlo Jackie Paris (September 20, 1924 – June 17, 2004) was an American jazz singer and guitarist. He is best known for his recordings of "Skylark" and "'Round Midnight" from the late 1940s to the early 1950s.

== Music career ==
=== Early years ===
Paris was born and raised in Nutley, New Jersey, to an Italian-American family, where he attended Nutley High School. His uncle Chick had been a guitarist with Paul Whiteman's orchestra. Paris was a popular child entertainer in vaudeville who shared the stage with Bill "Bojangles" Robinson and the Mills Brothers. He tap danced from his youth and into his years in the US Army.

After serving in the army during World War II, he was inspired by his friend Nat King Cole to assemble a trio featuring himself on guitar and vocals. The Jackie Paris Trio was a hit at the Onyx Club on New York's 52nd Street.

=== Recording and performing ===
He recorded from the 1940s into the 2000s. His albums include Songs by Jackie Paris (EmArcy), Jackie Paris Sings the Lyrics of Ira Gershwin (Time), and The Song Is Paris (Impulse!). The first song that he recorded was "Skylark", on one of two sessions made by his trio for MGM Records in 1947. He recorded Thelonious Monk's "Round Midnight", which was produced by the critic Leonard Feather and featured a young Dick Hyman on piano.

In 1949, he toured with the Lionel Hampton Orchestra and was invited to join Duke Ellington's Orchestra, but he was too exhausted to take it. Paris was part of the Lionel Hampton Orchestra that played at the Cavalcade of Jazz in Los Angeles at Wrigley Field which was produced by Leon Hefflin Sr. on July 10, 1949. They did a second concert at Lane Field in San Diego on September 3, 1949. He apparently sat in on occasion with the Charlie Parker Quintet, but Parker never toured with a vocalist, despite claims that Paris toured with him. There is a photograph of the two standing onstage at the Three Decues club, 1947 or 1948. He worked often with Charles Mingus, who called Paris his favorite singer and recorded with him often, including 1952's "Paris in Blue" and "Duke Ellington's Sound of Love" on the album Changes Two in 1974.

During the 1960s and 1970s, Paris frequently performed with his wife at the time Anne Marie Moss.

Paris performed or recorded with Bobby Scott, Charlie Shavers, Coleman Hawkins, Dizzy Gillespie, Donald Byrd, Eddie Costa, Gigi Gryce, Hank Jones, Joe Wilder, Johnny Mandel, Lee Konitz, Max Roach, Neal Hefti, Oscar Pettiford, Ralph Burns, Terry Gibbs, Tony Scott, and Wynton Kelly.

A documentary about him, 'Tis Autumn: The Search for Jackie Paris, came out in 2006.

=== Recognition ===
He won many jazz polls and awards, including those of Down Beat, Playboy, Swing Journal, and Metronome. In 1953, he was named Best New Male Vocalist of the Year in the first Down Beat Critics Poll. The winning female vocalist was Ella Fitzgerald, who repeatedly named Paris as one of her favorites.

In 2001, Paris played to a standing room crowd – and to a standing ovation – at New York's Birdland jazz club in Times Square. He was virtually the only performer to have appeared at every incarnation of the night spot, from the Birdland of the 1950s, to the present.

He was praised by comic Lenny Bruce, who shared the bill with him on many occasions. Bruce said, "I dig his talent. The audience loves him and he gets laughs. He is too much!"

== Awards and honors ==
- New Star Male Vocalist, Down Beat Critics Poll, 1953
- Best Male Vocalist, Playboy Musicians & Critics Poll, 1957–1961
- Gold Disc Award, Lucky to Be Me, Swing Journal, 1989

== Discography ==
- Songs by Jackie Paris (Wing, 1956)
- Skylark (Brunswick, 1957)
- The Jackie Paris Sound (EastWest, 1958)
- The Song Is Paris (Impulse!, 1962)
- Sings the Lyrics of Ira Gershwin (Time, 1962)
- Live at the Maisonette with Anne Marie Moss (Differant Drummer, 1975)
- Jackie Paris (Audiophile, 1981)
- Nobody Else but Me (Audiophile, 1988)
- Lucky to Be Me (EmArcy, 1989)
- Love Songs (EmArcy, 1990)
- The Intimate Jackie Paris (Hudson, 2001)
