= George Elliott Clarke =

Canadian poet, playwright and literary critic (born 1960)

George Elliott Clarke OC ONS
- Clarke in 2018.
- Born: February 12, 1960 (age 66); Windsor, Nova Scotia, Canada
- Education: Queen Elizabeth High School; University of Waterloo; Dalhousie University; Queen's University
- Occupations: Writer; poet; academic
- Known for: Poet Laureate of Toronto (2012–2015); Canadian Parliamentary Poet Laureate (2016–2017)
- Relatives: Portia White (great-aunt); Bill White (great-uncle); Jack White (great-uncle); William Andrew White (great-grandfather)
- Website: www.georgeelliottclarke.net

George Elliott Clarke OC ONS (born February 12, 1960) is a Canadian poet, playwright and literary critic who served as the Poet Laureate of Toronto from 2012 to 2015 and as the Canadian Parliamentary Poet Laureate in 2016–2017. Clarke's work addresses the experiences and history of the Black Canadian communities of Nova Scotia and New Brunswick, creating a cultural geography coined "Africadia".

== Life ==
Clarke was born to William and Geraldine Clarke in Windsor, Nova Scotia, near the Black Loyalist community of Three Mile Plains and grew up in Halifax, Nova Scotia. He graduated from Queen Elizabeth High School in 1978.

He earned a BA honours degree in English from the University of Waterloo (1984), an MA degree in English from Dalhousie University (1989) and a PhD degree in English from Queen's University (1993). He has received honorary degrees from Dalhousie University (LL.D.), the University of New Brunswick (Litt.D.), the University of Alberta (Litt.D.), the University of Waterloo (Litt.D.), and Saint Mary's University (Litt.D). He taught English and Canadian Studies at Duke University from 1994 to 1999 and was appointed the Seagrams Visiting Chair in Canadian Studies at McGill University for the academic year 1998–1999.

In 1999, he became professor of English at the University of Toronto where in 2003, he was appointed the inaugural E J Pratt Professor of Canadian Literature. Clarke has also served as a Noted Scholar at the University of British Columbia (2002), as a visiting scholar at Mount Allison University (2005) and as the William Lyon Mackenzie King Visiting Professor in Canadian Studies at Harvard University (2013–2014); and outside of the academic sphere, as a researcher for the Ontario Provincial Parliament (1982–1983), editor of the Imprint (University of Waterloo, 1984–1985) and The Rap (Halifax, 1985–1987), social worker for the Black United Front of Nova Scotia (1985–1986), parliamentary aide to Howard McCurdy (1987–1991) and newspaper columnist for the Halifax Daily News (1988–1989).

Clarke is active in poetry circles throughout Canada, the US, the Caribbean and Europe. He is also a founding member of the music collective Afro-Métis Nation, which put out its first album, Constitution, in May 2019. The group derives its name from the artists' mixed Africadian and Mi'kmaq descent. Clarke has described the group's sound as "a mash-up of southern-fried blues and saltwater spirituals, with Nashville guitars, Mi'kmaw-and-'African' drums, Highland bagpipes and Acadien fiddles."

== Writing career ==
Clarke has served as editor for collections of African-Canadian writers and poets in anthologies and studies such as Border Lines (1995), Eyeing the North Star (1997), Odysseys Home (2002), Fire on the Water (2002), Directions Home (2012) and Locating Home (2017). His work draws upon a range of literary and artistic traditions (both "high" and "low") and is inclusive of political, historical and spatial themes. His artistic influences include Shakespeare, Miles Davis, Ezra Pound, Pierre Elliott Trudeau and Malcolm X. His poetic and academic careers overlap in their particular emphasis on the perspectives of the African descendants in Canada and Nova Scotia especially the African-American slaves' descendants who settled on the East coast of Nova Scotia, whom he calls "Africadian". He writes that it is a word that he "minted from 'Africa' and 'Acadia' (the old name for Nova Scotia and New Brunswick), to denote the Black populations of the Maritimes and especially of Nova Scotia."

Some of his poetry has also been set to music by the a cappella gospel quartet Four the Moment.

He views "Africadian" literature as "literal and liberal—I canonize songs and sonnets, histories and homilies". Clarke has stated that he found further writing inspiration in the 1970s and his "individualist poetic scored with implicit social commentary" came from the "Gang of Seven" intellectuals, "poet-politicos: jazz trumpeter Miles Davis, troubadour-bard Bob Dylan, libertine lyricist Irving Layton, guerrilla leader and poet Mao Zedong, reactionary modernist Ezra Pound, Black Power orator Malcolm X and the Right Honourable Pierre Elliott Trudeau." Clarke found "as a whole, the group's blunt talk, suave styles, acerbic independence, raunchy macho, feisty lyricism, singing heroic and a scarf-and-beret chivalry quite, well, liberating." His poetry and scholarship address and challenge historic encounters with racism, segregated areas, discrimination, hatred, forced relocation and a loss of a sense of identity and belonging experienced by the Black populations of Canada.

In his anthology, Fire On The Water, Clarke uses a biblical timeline stretching from Genesis to Psalms and Proverbs to Revelation to present Black writings and authors born within a specific period. These names reflect the Africadians' and other Black peoples' forebears and the first singers' own preferences for singing "the Lord's song in this strange land". In his book, These Are the Words, a collaboration with Canadian poet John B. Lee, Clarke translates one of the nine books of the Bible's apocrypha into English vernacular.

In his 2007 play, Trudeau: Long March, Shining Path, Clarke describes Pierre Trudeau as "the Shakespearean character: a figure about whom it is almost impossible to say anything definitive because he is encompassed by so many contradictions, but that's what makes him interesting." In presenting a multicultural Trudeau on the international stage, Clarke seeks to capture the human dimensions, the personality of Trudeau, rather than his politics, so as to emphasize the dialogues among key characters and "show the people as people, not just exponents of ideas." In 2012, Clarke was given substantial critical recognition in a volume devoted to the body of his writing, Africadian Atlantic: Essays on George Elliott Clarke, edited by Joseph Pivato.

In his 2016 and 2017 collections of poems, Canticles I (MXXVI) and Canticles I (MMXVII), the names of which are a reference to Ezra Pound's The Cantos and The Song of Solomon, Clarke puts famous thinkers, explorers and rulers of the 17th, 18th and 20th centuries into a dialogue on slavery and heritage. Together, these collections make up the first part of a projected three-part epic. Canticles II: MMXIX was released in 2019.

In his time as Poet Laureate of Toronto, Clarke created the Poets' Corner at City Hall, and worked with the Toronto Public Library to create the Toronto Poetry Map, an electronic map of the city that marks all sites referenced in Canadian poetry and presents the relevant lines to the viewer. He also founded the East End Poetry Festival. Clarke is also the first Canadian Parliamentary Poet Laureate to have his poems recited in the Houses and recorded in Hansard.

== Family ==
Clarke is a great-nephew of the late Canadian opera singer Portia White, politician Bill White and labour union leader Jack White. A seventh-generation African Canadian, Clarke is descended from African-American refugees from the War of 1812 who escaped enslavement in America and were relocated to Nova Scotia. He is the great-grandson of William Andrew White, an American-born Baptist preacher and missionary, army chaplain and radio pioneer, who was one of the very few black officers in the British army worldwide during World War I. Clarke also has Mi'kmaq Indigenous ancestry.

== Awards and merits ==
In 1998, Clarke won the Portia White Prize for Artistic Achievement. In 2001, he won the Governor General's Award for poetry for his book Execution Poems, as well as the National Magazine Gold Medal for Poetry. He has also won the Dr. Martin Luther King Jr. Achievement Award (2004), the Pierre Elliott Trudeau Fellowship Prize (2005–2008), the Dartmouth Book Award for Fiction (2006), and the Eric Hoffer Book Award for Poetry (2009).

Clarke was appointed to the Order of Nova Scotia in 2006 and to the Order of Canada, at the rank of Officer, in 2008.

On January 16, 2008, Clarke was made an honorary Fellow of the Haliburton Literary Society, the oldest literary society in North America, at the University of King's College, Halifax; and in 2009, he was a co-recipient of the William P. Hubbard Award for Race Relations from the City of Toronto for his achievements and commitment in making a distinct difference in racial relations in Toronto. Clarke was chosen expressly for "his local and national leadership role in creating an understanding and awareness of African and black culture and excellence in his contribution to redefining culture."

In November 2012, Clarke became Toronto's fourth Poet Laureate.

In January 2016, Clarke became Canada's seventh Parliamentary Poet Laureate.

In 2018, thanks to a gift from Ms. Rebecca Gardiner, the George Elliott Clarke Scholarship Fund was established at Duke University.

His 2021 book J'Accuse! (Poem versus Silence) was shortlisted for the 2022 ReLit Award for poetry.

In 2022, Clarke was awarded the Queen Elizabeth II Platinum Jubilee Medal for his significant service to the province of Nova Scotia in the field of the Arts.

== Publications ==
- "To Paris, Burning," In Constance Rooke (ed.), Writing Away: the PEN Canada Travel Anthology, McClelland & Stewart Inc., 1994.
- Kamboureli, Smaro (1996), Making a Difference: Canadian Multicultural Literature. Toronto: Oxford University Press, pp. 491
- Tracey, Lindalee (1999), A Scattering of Seeds: The Creation of Canada. Toronto: McArthur & Company.
- Africadian Atlantic: Essays on George Elliott Clarke. ed. Joseph Pivato. Toronto: Guernica Editions, 2012. ISBN 978-1-55071-627-6

=== Poetry ===
- 1983: Saltwater Spirituals and Deeper Blues, Lawrencetown Beach, Nova Scotia: Pottersfield. ISBN 0-919001-12-2
- 1990: Whylah Falls, Vancouver: Polestar, ISBN 0-919591-57-4 (revised edition, 2000, ISBN 1-896095-50-X)
- 1994: Lush Dreams, Blue Exile: Fugitive Poems 1978–1993. Lawrencetown Beach, Nova Scotia: Pottersfield. ISBN 0-919001-83-1
- 1999: Gold Indigoes. Durham: Carolina Wren, ISBN 0-932112-40-4
- 2001: Execution Poems: The Black Acadian Tragedy of George and Rue. Wolfville, Nova Scotia: Gaspereau Press, ISBN 1-894031-48-2
- 2001: Blue. Vancouver: Polestar, ISBN 1-55192-414-5
- 2001: Blue II, A Trestle Chapbook in Running With Scissors, Montréal: Cumulus Press, ISBN 0-9683529-4-4
- 2005: Illuminated Verses. Toronto: Canadian Scholars' Press, ISBN 1-55130-280-2
- 2006: Black. Vancouver: Polestar, ISBN 1-55192-903-1
- 2008: Blues and Bliss: The Poetry of George Elliott Clarke. Wilfrid Laurier University Press, ISBN 1554580609
- 2009: I & I. Fredericton: Goose Lane, ISBN 978-0-86492-513-8
- 2011: Red. Gaspereau Press, ISBN 9781554470983
- 2013: Lasso the Wind: Aurélia’s Verses and Other Poems. Illus. Susan Tooke. Nimbus Books, ISBN 1771080507
- 2013: Illicit Sonnets. Eyewear Publishing, ISBN 978-1908998064
- 2014: Traverse. Exile Editions, ISBN 1550963953
- 2015: Extra Illicit Sonnets. Exile Editions, ISBN 1550964984
- 2016: Gold. Gaspereau Press, ISBN 9781554471577
- 2016: Canticles I (MMXVI). Guernica Editions, ISBN 9781550719123
- 2017: Canticles I (MMXVII). Guernica Editions, ISBN 9781771831901
- 2017: The Merchant of Venice (Retried). Kentville, Nova Scotia: Gaspereau Press.
- 2018: These Are the Words. Collaboration with John B. Lee. Hidden Book Press, ISBN 978-1-927725-55-9
- 2019: Portia White: A Portrait in Words. Nimbus Publishing, ISBN 1771086971
- 2021: J'Accuse! (Poem versus Silence)

=== Plays ===
- 1999: Whylah Falls: The Play. Toronto: Playwrights Canada, ISBN 0-88754-565-3
- 1999: Beatrice Chancy. Vancouver: Polestar, ISBN 1-896095-94-1
- 2003: Québécité. Wolfville, Nova Scotia, Gaspereau Press, ISBN 1-894031-74-1
- 2007: Trudeau: Long March, Shining Path. Kentville, Nova Scotia: Gaspereau Press, ISBN 1-55447-037-4

=== Novels ===
- 2005: George and Rue. Toronto: HarperCollins, ISBN 0-00-225539-1 / ISBN 0-00-648569-3
- 2016: The Motorcyclist. Toronto: HarperCollins

=== Memoir ===
- 2021: Where Beauty Survived

Written anthologies

- 2023: Whiteout: How Canada Cancels Blackness Nova Scotia, Véhicule Press, ISBN 9781550656077

=== Anthologies edited ===
- 1991: Fire on the Water: An Anthology of Black Nova Scotian Writing, Volume One. Lawrencetown Beach, Nova Scotia: Pottersfield, ISBN 0-919001-67-X
- 1992: Fire on the Water: An Anthology of Black Nova Scotian Writing, Volume Two. Lawrencetown Beach, Nova Scotia: Pottersfield, ISBN 0-919001-71-8
- 1995: Border Lines: Contemporary Poems in English. Edited by J.A. Wainwright, George Elliot Clarke and others. Mississauga, Ont.: Copp Clark, 1995. ISBN 0773053425
- 1997: Eyeing the North Star: Directions in African-Canadian Literature. Toronto: McClelland & Stewart, 1997 ISBN 0-7710-2125-9
- 2018: Locating Home: The First African-Canadian Novel and Verse Collections. Tightrope Books, 2018. ISBN 1988040213

=== Criticism ===
- 2002: Odysseys Home: Mapping African-Canadian Literature. Toronto: University of Toronto Press, ISBN 0-8020-8191-6
- 2011: Directions Home: Approaches to African-Canadian Literature. Toronto: University of Toronto Press, ISBN 978-0-8020-9425-4

== Awards ==
- 1979: Honourable Mention, Atlantic Writing Competition (Adult Poetry), Writers' Federation of Nova Scotia
- 1981: First Prize, Atlantic Writing Competition (Adult Poetry), Writers' Federation of Nova Scotia
- 1983: Second Prize, Bliss Carman Poetry Award, Banff Centre
- 1991: Archibald Lampman Award for Poetry, Ottawa Independent Writers
- 1998: Portia White Prize, Nova Scotia Arts Council
- 1998: Bellagio Center Fellow, Rockefeller Foundation, New York City
- 1999: Alumni Achievement Award, University of Waterloo
- 2002: Governor General's Award for Poetry, for Execution Poems
- National Magazine Gold Award for Poetry
- 2004: Martin Luther King Jr. Achievement Award, Black Theatre Workshop
- 2006: Pierre Elliott Trudeau Fellowship Prize, Pierre Elliott Trudeau Foundation
- 2006: Dartmouth Book Award for Fiction
- 2006: Frontieras Poesis Premuil [Prize], Poesis Magazine, International Poetry Festival, Satu Mare, Romania
- 2006: Order of Nova Scotia
- 2007: Longlisted for the International Dublin Literary Award, for George and Rue
- 2008: Officer of the Order of Canada
- 2009: Shortlisted, Dartmouth Book Award for Fiction
- 2010: Shortlisted, Acorn-Plantos Award for People's Poetry
- 2012: Honorary Doctor of Letters degree from Acadia University
- 2012: Queen Elizabeth II Diamond Jubilee Medal
- 2012: Excellence in the Arts Award (Canadian Civil Liberties Association)
- 2012: Appointed by the Toronto City Council to the post of Poet Laureate of Toronto
- 2016: Appointed by The Parliament of Canada to the post of Canadian Parliamentary Poet Laureate
- 2017: Lifetime Achievement Award, Dalhousie University Alumni Association
- 2017: Trailblazers Award: National Black Canadians Summit, Federation of Black Canadians & Michaëlle Jean Foundation
- 2017: Elected, Fellow of the Royal Canadian Geographical Society

== See also ==
- Acadia
- Canadian literature
- Canadian poetry
- List of Canadian poets
- List of writers from Nova Scotia
- List of University of Waterloo people
