= Henry Nemo =

American songwriter

Henry Nemo (June 8, 1909 – November 26, 1999) was an American musician, songwriter, and actor in Hollywood films who had a reputation as a hipster.

== Band leading ==
In 1941, Nemo formed his own 19-piece band. The group featured four Chinese women as singers. Playing on his nickname, "The Neme," the band's slogan was "Hit the Beam with the Neme."

== Musical compositions ==
Nemo's first hit composition was "I Let a Song Go Out of My Heart." He also composed the song standards "Don't Take Your Love From Me" and "'Tis Autumn", both published in 1941. He also composed the incidental music and lyrics for the 1959 Broadway production of Saul Levitt's play The Andersonville Trial directed by José Ferrer and starring George C. Scott.

Nemo worked with Frank Sinatra, Duke Ellington, Mildred Bailey, Tommy Dorsey. Artie Shaw recorded his song "Don't Take Your Love from Me" in 1941 with a band of mostly African-American musicians accompanying African-American vocalist Lena Horne.

== Acting ==
In 1947, Henry Nemo appeared in Song of the Thin Man, a murder mystery-comedy directed by Edward Buzzell, which is the sixth and final film in MGM's Thin Man series. It starred William Powell and Myrna Loy as Nick and Nora Charles, based on characters created by Dashiell Hammett. Henry Nemo played the character called The Neem. In 1989, Nemo appeared in The Plot Against Harry, a film made in 1969 by independent filmmakers Michael Roemer and Robert M. Young.

== Legacy ==
Nemo is credited as having been the inspiration for the Starkist tuna advertising mascot, Charlie the Tuna.
