= Jack White (politician) =

Canadian labour union activist

John Edgar "Jack" White (July 10, 1925 - September 10, 2002) was a Canadian labour union activist. He was the first elected black representative of the Ironworkers, and one of the first Canadian Union of Public Employees (CUPE) national staff representatives from a minority background.

Born in Truro, Nova Scotia, White was one of the first black Canadians to run for election to the Legislative Assembly of Ontario for the Co-operative Commonwealth Federation in 1959. He stood as an Ontario New Democratic Party candidate in Dovercourt in the 1963 election. In the early 1960s, White was involved with a Toronto-based newspaper.

== Legacy ==
- Jack White Community Service Award given by the Coalition of Black Trade Unionists (CBTU)
