= List of Black Canadian writers =

This is a list of Black Canadian writers.

== A ==
- Elamin Abdelmahmoud, Sudanese-Canadian writer, culture and politics commentator
- Robert Adetuyi
- Randell Adjei
- André Alexis
- Mohamed Abdulkarim Ali
- Lillian Allen
- Archie Alleyne
- Kanika Ambrose
- Aba Amuquandoh
- Ricky Anderson
- Vincent Anioke
- Trey Anthony
- Faith Arkorful
- Brandon Ash-Mohammed
- Ryad Assani-Razaki
- Dorothy A. Atabong
- Edem Awumey

== B ==
- Britta Badour
- Valérie Bah
- Cameron Bailey
- Mathis Bailey
- Andrea Bain
- Angèle Bassolé-Ouédraogo
- Jephté Bastien
- Jacqueline Beaugé-Rosier
- Carrie Best
- Bertrand Bickersteth
- Ngaire Blankenberg
- Shane Book
- Walter Borden
- Cory Bowles
- George Boyd
- D. M. Bradford
- Lawrence Ytzhak Braithwaite
- Rella Braithwaite
- Dionne Brand
- Wendy Motion Brathwaite
- Jade Brooks
- Christene Browne
- Kim Brunhuber

== C ==
- Cadence Weapon
- Morgan Campbell
- Celina Caesar-Chavannes
- Myriam J. A. Chancy
- Karen Chapman
- David Chariandy
- Miryam Charles
- Ajahnis Charley
- Jillian Christmas
- Austin Clarke
- Cheril N. Clarke
- George Elliott Clarke
- Michèle Pearson Clarke
- Lisa Codrington
- Desmond Cole
- Lucretia Newman Coleman
- Wayde Compton
- Ngardy Conteh George
- Marilyn Cooke
- Afua Cooper
- Archie Crail
- Ayesha Curry

== D ==
- Hubert Davis
- D'bi.young anitafrika
- Adebe DeRango-Adem
- Orville Lloyd Douglas
- Antonio Michael Downing
- Alison Duke
- Alvin Duncan

== E ==
- Amatoritsero Ede
- Esi Edugyan
- Francesca Ekwuyasi
- Gérard Étienne
- Karena Evans
- Aisha Evelyna

== F ==
- Anthony Q. Farrell
- Minister Faust
- Cheryl Foggo
- Cecil Foster
- Fil Fraser
- Kelly Fyffe-Marshall

== G ==
- Lorena Gale
- Shawn Gerrard
- Chantal Gibson
- Malcolm Gladwell
- Sonia Godding Togobo
- Fitzroy Gordon
- Shauntay Grant
- Marsha Greene
- Robert Joseph Greene
- Stanley G. Grizzle

== H ==
- Brandon Hackett
- Sylvia Hamilton
- Alicia K. Harris
- Wilson A. Head
- Anna Minerva Henderson
- Sasha Leigh Henry
- Josiah Henson
- Dan Hill
- Daniel G. Hill
- Lawrence Hill
- Nadia Hohn
- Jennifer Holness
- Nalo Hopkinson

== I ==
- Dana Inkster
- Dionne Irving
- Richard Iton

== J ==
- Selwyn Jacob
- Jacky Jasper
- Aisha Sasha John
- Denham Jolly
- El Jones
- Clifton Joseph
- Marie-Ève Juste

== K ==
- Aristote Kavungu
- Kaie Kellough
- Yejide Kilanko
- Chelene Knight
- Knowmadic
- Maka Kotto
- Odimumba Kwamdela

== L ==
- Sonnet L'Abbé
- Dany Laferrière
- Didier Leclair
- Sharon Lewis
- Travis Lindsay
- Canisia Lubrin

== M ==
- Myriam Magassouba
- Rebecca Makonnen
- Ahdri Zhina Mandiela
- Yolanda T. Marshall
- Eternity Martis
- Valerie Mason-John
- Janice Lynn Mather
- Marie-Sœurette Mathieu
- Yasmine Mathurin
- Robyn Maynard
- Suzette Mayr
- Melchior Mbonimpa
- Tawiah M'carthy
- Berend McKenzie
- Katherine McKittrick
- Tessa McWatt
- Stella Meghie
- Araya Mengesha
- Weyni Mengesha
- Nega Mezlekia
- Kim Katrin Milan
- Kagiso Lesego Molope
- Andrew Moodie
- Harrison Mooney
- Annmarie Morais
- Dwayne Morgan
- Rania El Mugammar
- Sheila Murray
- Mustafa the Poet
- Téa Mutonji

== N ==
- Blaise Ndala
- Kathleen Newman-Bremang
- Omari Newton
- Cecily Nicholson
- Alexander Nunez
- Lonzo Nzekwe

== O ==
- David Nandi Odhiambo
- Charles Officer
- Otoniya J. Okot Bitek
- Tolu Oloruntoba
- Cheluchi Onyemelukwe
- Chika Stacy Oriuwa
- Gabriel Osson

== P ==
- Henri Pardo
- Amanda Parris
- Kayla Perrin
- Anthony Phelps
- M. NourbeSe Philip
- Ben Philippe
- Bilal Philips
- Carmine Pierre-Dufour
- Joseph Jomo Pierre
- C. L. Polk
- Jamila Pomeroy
- Harold H. Potter
- Claire Prieto
- Althea Prince
- Garth Prince
- Will Prosper

== R ==
- Zalika Reid-Benta
- Alix Renaud
- Jael Richardson
- Chris Robinson
- Charles Lightfoot Roman
- Lucah Rosenberg-Lee
- Denise Ryner

== S ==
- Donna-Michelle St. Bernard
- Rodney Saint-Éloi
- Liselle Sambury
- Robert Edison Sandiford
- Mairuth Sarsfield
- Charles R. Saunders
- Cilia Sawadogo
- Jasmine Sealy
- Djanet Sears
- Olive Senior
- Mary Ann Shadd
- Makeda Silvera
- Malinda S. Smith
- Frances-Anne Solomon
- Corrine Sparks
- Chris Spence
- Nicole Stamp
- Chris Strikes
- Karl Subban
- Elsie Suréna
- Sudz Sutherland

== T ==
- Glenn Taylor
- Kai Thomas
- R. T. Thorne
- Thyrone Tommy
- Laurie Townshend
- Maxine Tynes

== U ==
- Chimwemwe Undi
- Louise Uwacu

== V ==
- Clement Virgo

== W ==
- Rinaldo Walcott
- Abraham Beverley Walker
- Fred Ward
- Syrus Marcus Ware
- K'naan Warsame
- Bahia Watson
- Freddy Will
- Ian Williams
- Leighton Alexander Williams
- Stephen Williams

== See also ==
- Lists of Canadian writers
