= Harold Potter (disambiguation) =

Harold H. Potter (1914–2004) was a Canadian sociologist.

Harold Potter may also refer to:

- Harold Potter, legal historian whose Historical Introduction to English Law was edited by Albert Kiralfy
- Harry Potter (footballer) (1923-1992), English footballer, see List of Rochdale A.F.C. players (25–99 appearances)

== See also ==
- Harry Potter (disambiguation)
- Harold Everett Porter (1887–1936), American writer
- Vivian Harold Potter (1878–1968), New Zealand politician
