= St. Matthew's High School =

St. Matthew's High School may refer to:

- St. Matthew's High School, Keiskammahoek, Eastern Cape, South Africa
- St. Matthew's High School, Conshohocken Pennsylvania, United States
- St. Matthew's High School, Flint, Michigan, United States
- St. Matthew's High School, Melrose, Louisiana, United States
