= The Tree of Spirits =

- French: L'Arbre aux esprits
- Directed by: Cilia Sawadogo
- Screenplay by: Cilia Sawadogo
- Produced by: Planète Films
- Starring: Muna Mingole, Fabrice Koffy, Rasmata Sawadogo, Serge Djibo, Mamadou Togola, Bélinda Mady, Mathalie Djibo
- Edited by: Phyllis Lewis
- Music by: Chris Crilly, Njacko Backo
- Release date: 2005
- Running time: 45 minutes
- Country: Burkina Faso

The Tree of Spirits (French: L'Arbre aux esprits) is a 2005 Burkinabé film.

== Synopsis ==
In the desert savannah, Kodou and Tano meet Ayoka, the caretaker of a century old tree that a contractor wants to cut down. Kodou, guided by Ayoka, seeks his ancestors to ask for their help. Tano stays at the tree to protect it. But the ancestors can only advise him, the children must find the solution themselves. They discover that the gigantic baobab is a door between two worlds. The spirit of the rain, trapped by the spirit of the drought, can't come back to Earth. Without the sacred baobab, the road to Earth will remain closed forever and nature's balance will be shattered.
