= Centerprise Women's Café =

1990s Women-only space in Hackney, London

Centerprise Women's Café was a women-only space at the Centerprise Community Centre in Hackney, East London. The Women's Café was held on the last Friday of every month, with a mix of scheduled performers and an open mic. Every other month, Word Up was for black women only.

== History ==
After a series of lesbian reading sessions at the London Women's Centre had ended, Bernadette Halpin helped found the first Word Up Women's Café at the Centerprise Community Centre in Hackney in February 1991. The Women's Café soon gained a reputation as the only women-only performance space in London for writer, musicians, dancers and comedians. Six months later Dorothea Smartt joined Halpin at Centerprise as the Black Literature Worker, and they started a night reserved for black women performers. In 1993, Smartt and Halpin co-edited an anthology of lesbian poets who had performed at Word Up, titled Words from the Women's Café: Lesbian Poetry from Word Up, including work by Patience Agbabi and Valerie Mason-John.

The last café night was held in 1994, after Smartt and Halpin had both left Centerprise.
