= KZN Literary Tourism =

- Established: 2002
- Type: Research Project
- Location: KwaZulu-Natal, South Africa
- Leader: Lindy Stiebel
- Website: www.literarytourism.co.za

KZN Literary Tourism is a literary tourism research project initiated in 2002 by Professor Lindy Stiebel, a lecturer in the English Studies department at the University of KwaZulu-Natal. The project has created an online archive of over 100 writers linked to the KwaZulu-Natal province, collected reviews of local literature, conducted interviews of local authors, promoted local literary events such as Time of the Writer and investigated “the links between literature and tourism in scholarly colloquia and publications”. The project has also been responsible for creating eight writer trails which attempt to connect writers, their works and place within the province.

== History ==
KZN Literary Tourism was born out of a “larger National Research Foundation project focused on Identity and Tourism, based at the University of Durban-Westville”. Despite the wealth of literary talent produced by KwaZulu-Natal very little had been done to promote literary tourism within the province. After being given a five-year grant by the National Research Foundation (NRF), the project began to remedy this situation by constructing an “online archive of writers associated in one way or another with KwaZulu-Natal …; to investigate the links between literature and tourism in scholarly colloquia and publications; and to support a number of students involved in the project through bursaries”. In addition to this, the project created a “series of documentary films made by David Basckin and Zoë Molver about writers including Lewis Nkosi, Marguerite Poland and poets Douglas Livingstone and Roy Campbell. These films were archived by the National English Literary Museum (NELM) in Grahamstown.

== Aims ==
An author selected on the Literary Map.

The post-NRF part of the project has focused on the development of the project’s website. This includes improving the online archive which would also feature the writers on a Google Earth map that displays the places they are associated with. Additionally, the site included reviews of local literature, podcasts, promotion of local literary events such as Time of the Writer, and drawing revenue from advertising for publishers and booksellers.

The project also publishes literary trails; “routes which bring together writers and the places about which they write - a literary map of the region”. These trails attempt to create awareness of local writers with the potential of creating appreciation of the writers and aiding the sales of their publications. The trails are run by community guides who are trained by the project.

== Trails ==
The trails include a concise bibliography of selected writers, an extract from their works and the places they are linked to. In order for a writer to be included they need to have either been born within the KwaZulu-Natal province or have written “extensively or intensely and typically about the region or places within it”. Since 2005, the project has compiled and printed eight literary trails; Rider Haggard (2005), Alan Paton (2006), Grey Street Writer’s (2007), Cato Manor Writer’s (2008), INK Writer’s Trail (2009), Midlands Writer’s Trail (2010), South Coast’s Writer’s Trail (2011) and North Coast Writer’s Trail (2012). The INK Writer’s Trail is the project's most popular trail.

== Reception ==
The Literary Tourism in KZN project takes us through the whole dark forest (or should that be mangrove swamp?), with its shards of light. For it is not morbid at all, though it will stir up the sediment in your soul as to what you thought you had seen or heard of this country so far.

— K. McGowan, Frontline News

The research conducted by KZN Literary Tourism has been well received by the media. Described as providing “fascinating sites, information and experience to people interested in local literature”, the project has been commended for its impact in KwaZulu-Natal. It has been recognised for boosting local tourism. It has played a role in making the province's tourism identity more complex and sophisticated by offering more than the “gorgeous geography” and “temperate climate” the province is traditionally celebrated for.

The project has provided an outlet for those interested in “struggle tourism” which deals with tourism encompassing South Africa's anti-Apartheid history. Additionally, the project has been lauded for promoting reading by making literature “accessible and exciting”.

Several components of the project have been appreciated. The trail brochures designed by Disturbance, a Durban-based design studio, have been commended, the website deemed “excellent”, the creation of podcasts have been commended, while the Google maps have been described as “nifty” and “useful”. The academic papers on the project's website have been praised as “invaluable” to those involved in tourism and/or interested in the KwaZulu-Natal province. June Drummond in Conversation with Zoe Molver, a film produced by the project, was described as a “well-researched film” of a “high standard” that continued the “valuable work done by David Basckin and Zoe Molver in producing films which provide valuable insights into the lives of various South African writers.”

Individual trails run by the project have been recognised for their quality. Of the Rider Haggard trail, Gateway to Kwazulu-Natal writes that it is a “fantastic approach to exploring the province and its history”. Yasantha Naidoo recommended the Grey Street Literary Trail “for those wanting to experience the rich, cultural heritage of Durban’s oriental district”. Through the South Coast Writer's Trail, the project has been acknowledged as expanding the history of the region to more than just a “holiday destination, somewhere to lie on the beach [or] try to find elusive sardines and take a well-earned break”. Instead, the trail explores the regions “intriguing literary history” such as the place indentured Indian labourers worked on sugar-cane plantations and the place the magazine, Voorslag, was created.

According to Stiebel, the enthusiastic response from people who have gone on the trails “has been positive and enlightening”.

== Achievements ==
In 2009 Stiebel revealed the project's website received more than 5000 hits per month. The project has featured at the Midlands Meander Literary Festival in 2010, the 2011 Franschhoek Literary Festival, and the 2015 Ramsgate Literary Festival. In 2014 the project's Grey Street Trail was endorsed as a parallel project to the 25th International Union of Architects World Congress which was held in Durban. Despite the niche market the project caters to, it has received significant attention from international and national students and tourists interested in the field. In 2017 Niall McNulty and Lindy Stiebel published A Literary Guide to KwaZulu-Natal, a compilation of their research over several years.
