= Henry Potter =

Henry Potter may refer to:

- Henry Potter (judge) (1766–1857), longest-serving United States district court judge
- Henry C. Potter (1835–1908), bishop of the Episcopal Church of the United States
- H. C. Potter (1904–1977), American producer/director
- Henry Potter (golfer) (1881–1955), American golfer
- Henry F. Potter, a.k.a. "Mr. Potter", a fictional character in It's a Wonderful Life
- Henry Steven Potter, Acting Governor of Kenya in 1952, during the early stages of the Mau Mau Uprising

== See also ==
- Harry Potter (disambiguation)
