= Lesley Beake =

South African children's author

Lesley Beake (born 1949) is a Scottish-born South African children's author.

== Life About Lesley Beake ==
Lesley Beake was born in Scotland and went to school in Edinburgh She lives in South Africa, where she has worked as a teacher. Her children's novels, "which address the plight of children of certain tribes in southern Africa, attract an adult audience."

=== Early life and education ===
Lesley Beake was born in Scotland in 1949 and later moved to Southern Africa, where she spent much of her childhood in countries including Zambia and South Africa.

She studied education and worked as a teacher before becoming a full-time writer.

== Career ==
Beake began publishing fiction in the 1980s and became recognized for writing stories centered on children and adolescents navigating social and cultural change in Southern Africa.

Her novel Song of Be received international attention and won several literary awards for its portrayal of a San girl living in the Kalahari Desert.

== Works ==
- Detained at Her Majesty's pleasure: the journal of Peter David Hadden, 1986
- The Strollers, 1987. Winner of the Percy FitzPatrick Award, 1986-1988, Winner of the Young African Award, 1987-1988
- A Cageful of Butterflies, 1989. Winner of the Percy FitzPatrick Award, 1988-9. Winner of the M-Net Book Prize, 1991.
- Strollers 1987
- Rainbow, 1989
- Traveller, 1989
- Merino, 1989
- Serena's Story, 1990
- Tjojo and the wild horses, 1990
- Song of Be, 1991
- Bau and the baobab tree, 1992
- Mandi's wheels, 1992
- The Race, 1992
- Café Thunderball, 1993
- One dark, dark night, 1993
- Jakey, 1997
- An Introduction to Africa, 2000
- Home Now, 2006
- Remembering Green, 2009
