= Percy FitzPatrick Award =

The Percy FitzPatrick Award, in recognition of author Sir Percy Fitzpatrick, was initiated in 1970 for the best South African children's book in English.

Initiated in 1970 by the South African Library Association (SALA), initially only books written and published in South Africa could qualify. Since most children's authors published with international publishers, there were few acceptable submissions in the early years. In 1977, it was decided to broaden the criteria to include books written by South Africans, or from a South African perspective.

In 1980, SALA became the South African Institute of Librarianship and Information Science (SAILIS), and its Committee for Children's Books became responsible for the awards until its disbandment in 1998. Since then, the awards have become the responsibility of the English Academy of South Africa.

In 2014 Kagiso Lesego Molope became the first Black author to win the award.

== Winners ==
| Year | Book | Name |
|---|---|---|
| 2024 | Rodentia | Luke Calder |
| 2022 | Luntu Masiza | Penny Latimer |
| 2022 | Sea Star Summer | Sally Partridge |
| 2020 | Sing Down the Stars | Nerine Dorman |
| 2018 | Fault Lines | Joanne MacGregor |
| 2016 | The Mark | Edyth Bulbring |
| 2014 | This Book Betrays My Brother | Kagiso Lesego Molope |
| 2012 | Melly, Fatty and Me | Edyth Bulbring |
| 2010 | Daniel Fox and the Jester's Legacy | Andy Petersen |
| 2008 | Superzero | Darrel Bristow-Bovey |
| 2006 | Savannah 2116 AD | Jenny Robson |
| 2004 | The eighth man | Michael Williams |
| 2002 | Skyline | Patricia Schonstein Pinnock |
| 2000 | The slayer of the shadows | Elana Bregin |
| 1994–1995 | The boy who counted to a million | Lawrence Bransby |
| 1992–1993 | Stories South of the Sun | compiled by Christel and Hans Bodenstein and Linda Rode |
| 1990–1991 | 92 Queens Road | Dianne Case |
| 1988–1989 | A Cageful of Butterflies | Lesley Beake |
| 1986–1987 | The Strollers | Lesley Beake |
| 1982–1983 | The Wood-ash Stars | Marguerite Poland |
| 1979 | The Mantis and the Moon | Marguerite Poland |
| 1970–1978 | No award | |

== See also ==
- Olive Schreiner Prize
- Sol Plaatje Prize for Translation
- Thomas Pringle Award
