= Bertrand Bickersteth =

Canadian poet

Bertrand Bickersteth is a Canadian poet. His debut collection, The Response of Weeds, was published in 2020 and won the Gerald Lampert Award from the League of Canadian Poets in 2021.

From Calgary, Alberta, he is a communication instructor at Olds College. In addition to his poetry, he has also published academic work on Black Canadian culture, including the history of Black Canadian settlement in Western Canada and critical analysis of the work of Wayde Compton and Canisia Lubrin.

The Response of Weeds was also shortlisted for the Stephan G. Stephansson Award for Poetry and the City of Calgary W. O. Mitchell Book Prize at the 2021 Alberta Literary Awards.
