= St. Matthew's High School, Keiskammahoek =

St. Matthew's High School

Location
- Keiskammahoek, Eastern Cape (Amahlathi Local Municipality, Amathole District Municipality); South Africa; 32°38′57″S 27°11′04″E

Information
- Established: 1856
- Website: www.stmatthewshighschool.com

St. Matthew's High School is a government high school in Keiskammahoek, Eastern Cape, South Africa. It has boarding facility for girls, day-boys do attend the school.

== History ==
John Armstrong, the first bishop of Grahamstown on his enthronement in 1854 committed himself and his church to respond to the needs of the Xhosa people suffering the impact of the wars of dispossession. This resulted in the establishment St Matthews Mission at Keiskammahoek (among others).

Chief Socishe leased 690 acres (280 ha) of land for the St Matthews Mission and Sir George Grey, the colonial governor, approved the development. The school began to operate in 1856.

The institutional link between St Matthews and St. Andrew's College, Grahamstown began in the 1860s when students were sent from mission schools to what was known as the Kaffir Institute that was part of St Andrews College, run by the Revd William Greenstock. Greenstock (who married Frances Ellen Cotterill, the daughter of Henry Cotterill, the second bishop of Grahamstown) later moved to St Matthew's Mission and where he became a skilled linguist and writer of hymns in the Xhosa language.

The Revd H.B. Smith, the first resident missionary to St Matthews, worked closely with the military chaplain, the Revd George Dacre, to lay the foundations of the earliest buildings and build the water furrows that still supply water to the school.

In the 1860s The Revd Charles Taberer moved to the school and began offering academic classes in the morning and engaging the pupils in industrial work in the afternoons. He oversaw the laying of the foundation stone of the church and opened a hostel for girls.

== Restoration ==
The Church of the Province of Southern Africa, (now named the Anglican church of Southern Africa) decided in 1957 after a painful decision making process to withdraw from education where the 1953 Bantu Education Act was applicable. Like many other mission schools, St Matthews was taken over by the state as a result of the Bantu Education Act. The St. Matthew's Mission continued, but without Anglican involvement in the school.

A project to restore the mission schools came about after then Arts and Culture Minister, Pallo Jordan and the then Anglican Archbishop Njongonkulu Ndungane held a brainstorming session in August 2007 in which they discussed restoring historical schools; mission schools in particular.

== Notable alumni and alumnae ==
- Nosiviwe Mapisa-Nqakula, a former Minister of Home Affairs
- James Calata

== See also ==
- Shades, the novel by Marguerite Poland
- Nancy Charton

== Notes and references ==
- Eve, Jeanette (2003). A Literary Guide to the Eastern Cape: Places and the Voices of Writers. Juta and Company. ISBN 978-1-919930-15-2.
- Gulwa, Siyalo (28 October 2011). "ST MATTS HOSTEL GETS R6Million UPGRADE". Walter Sisulu University news agency.
- De Wet, Chris J.; Whisson, Michael G. (1997). From reserve to region: apartheid and social change in the Keiskammahoek District of (former) Ciskei, 1950 to 1990. Grahamstown: Institute for Social and Economic Research, Rhodes University. ISBN 9780868103310.
- Edwards, Graeme; Perumal, Juliet Christine (2014). "The historic schools and their influence : women in school leadership in upholding the legacy". Faculty of Education (Conference Proceedings). hdl:10210/13184.
- Gaitskell, Deborah (2009). "Gender, Power and Voice in South African Anglicanism: The Society of Women Missionaries'Journal, 1913–1955". South African Historical Journal. 61 (2): 254–277. doi:10.1080/02582470902859484. ISSN 0258-2473. S2CID 143588506.
- Denis, Philippe (2012). "The Beginnings of Anglican Theological Education in South Africa, 1848–1963". The Journal of Ecclesiastical History. 63 (3): 516–533. doi:10.1017/S0022046910002988. ISSN 0022-0469.
- Charton, Nancy (1991). "Umfundisi Wethu: Vignettes from St Matthew's Mission, Keiskammahoek, 1986". In Denise Ackermann; Jonathan A. Draper; Emma Mashinini (eds.). Women hold up half the sky: women in the church in Southern Africa. Pietermaritzburg Cluster Publications. ISBN 978-0-9583141-5-2.
- White, Tim (2008). "The expulsion of Mary Calata: The disturbance at St Matthews missionary institution, March 1945" (PDF). Historia. 53 (1): 82–101.
- Switzer, Les; Switzer, Donna (1979). The Black press in South Africa and Lesotho: a descriptive bibliographic guide to African, Coloured, and Indian newspapers, newsletters, and magazines, 1836-1976. Hall. ISBN 9780816181742.
- Wilson, Monica (1952). Keiskammahoek Rural Survey: Social structure. Pietermaritzburg: Shuter and Shooter.
- Whitman, Daniel (2014). Outsmarting Apartheid: An Oral History of South Africa's Cultural and Educational Exchange with the United States, 1960–1999. SUNY Press. ISBN 978-1-4384-5122-0.
