= Shades (novel) =

Historical novel by Marguerite Poland

- Author: Marguerite Poland
- Language: English
- Publisher: Penguin Books
- Publication date: 1993

Shades is a historical novel written by Marguerite Poland. The book was first published in 1993 by Penguin Books. The story centers around the early parts of South Africa's history in the Eastern Cape.

== Plot ==
The plot revolves around a family, the Farboroughs, who lived in the Eastern Cape of South Africa in the early 1900s. It is set in a small Eastern Cape community known as St Matthias (St Matthew). The main protagonist is Walter Brownley who lived in the early parts of South Africa's war against Britain. Several racial issues are tackled in the book in regard to black African exploitation as seen on the mines of the Highveld.

== Locations ==
The entire story takes place in South Africa.

- St Matthias, Eastern Cape
- Mbokothwe, Eastern Cape
- King Williams Town, Eastern Cape
- Grahamstown, Eastern Cape
- Johannesburg, Transvaal province now Gauteng

== See also ==
St. Matthew's High School, Keiskammahoek

== Notes and references ==
- Shades. Penguin. 1993. ISBN 978-0-14-302713-3.
