= Harry Potter (disambiguation) =

Harry Potter is a series of novels by J. K. Rowling.

Harry Potter may also refer to other parts of the franchise:

- Harry Potter (character), the franchise's title character
- Harry Potter (film series), the David Heyman-produced film series based on the Rowling novels
  - Harry Potter and the Philosopher's Stone (2001 film), also known as Harry Potter and the Sorcerer's Stone
  - Harry Potter and the Chamber of Secrets (2002 film)
  - Harry Potter and the Prisoner of Azkaban (2004 film)
  - Harry Potter and the Goblet of Fire (2005 film)
  - Harry Potter and the Order of the Phoenix (2007 film)
  - Harry Potter and the Half-Blood Prince (2009 film)
  - Harry Potter and the Deathly Hallows – Part 1 (2010 film)
  - Harry Potter and the Deathly Hallows – Part 2 (2011 film)
- Harry Potter (TV series), an upcoming television series
- Wizarding World, the media franchise based on the Harry Potter books
- Fictional universe of Harry Potter, the shared fictional universe in which the Harry Potter novels, films and other media are set
- Harry Potter and the Cursed Child, a 2016 theatrical play
- Harry Potter (pinball), an 2025 pinball machine

== Others ==
- Harry Potter (journalist) (1941–2014), Australian television journalist and crime reporter
- Harry Potter (rugby union) (born 1997), English-born Australian rugby union player
- Harry Potter Jr. and Harry Potter Sr., the name of two characters in the 1986 film Troll
- Harry Potter (footballer), English footballer

== See also ==
- List of Harry Potter-related topics
- Henry Potter (disambiguation)
- Harold Potter (disambiguation)
- Harrison Potter (1891–1984), American musician
- Harry Porter (1882–1965), American high jumper
