= Irene Luxbacher =

Canadian artist and writer

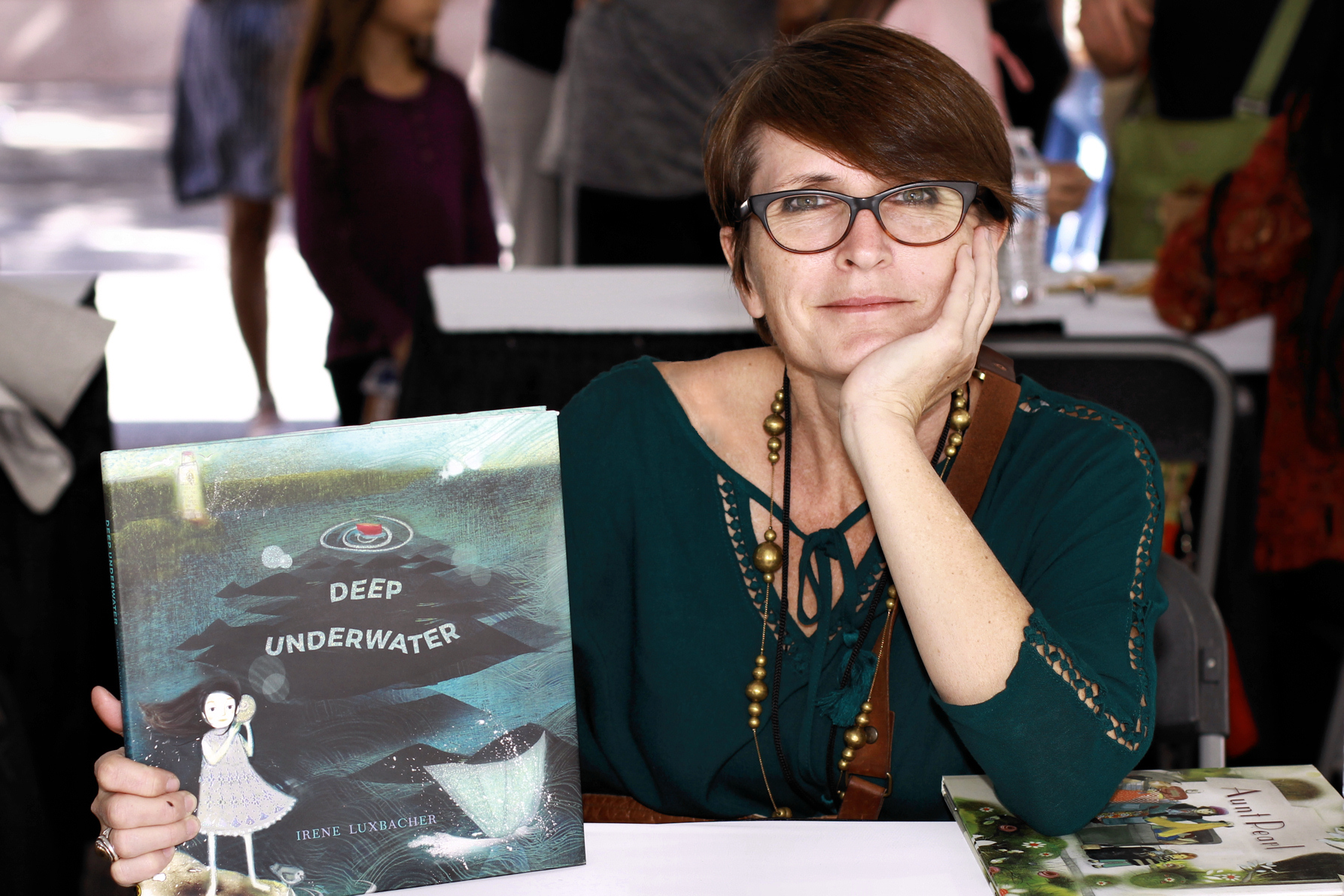
Luxbacher at the 2019 Texas Book Festival

Irene Luxbacher (born December 10, 1970, in Toronto, Ontario) is a Canadian artist, an author and children's book illustrator.

After graduating with a degree in Art History from Queen's University, she studied Fine Art (specifically drawing and painting) at Emily Carr University of Art and Design. She has a background in art education and has led visual arts workshops in Public schools in Toronto and at The Avenue Road Arts School. Both the Jumbo Books and the Starting Art Series have received much critical acclaim and reviews from librarians, teachers and parents, particularly homeschooling parents.

Luxbacher was a finalist for the 2009 Governor General's Awards for her illustrations found in The Imaginary Garden published by Kids Can Press (text by Andrew Larsen).

Luxbacher lives in Toronto, Ontario, Canada.

== Works ==
=== Picture books ===
==== As author and illustrator ====
- Mattoo, Let's Play!, 2010
- Mr. Frank, 2014
- Deep Underwater, 2018

==== As illustrator ====
- The Imaginary Garden, 2009; written by Andrew Larsen
- Malaika's Costume, 2016; written by Nadia L. Hohn
- The Not-So-Faraway Adventure, 2016; written by Andrew Larsen
- Malaika's Winter Carnival, 2017; written by Nadia L. Hohn
- Treasure, 2019; written by Mireille Messier
- Aunt Pearl, 2019; written by Monica Kulling
- Malaika's Surprise, 2021; written by Nadia L. Hohn

=== Activity books ===
==== As author and illustrator ====
- The Jumbo Book of Art, 2003
- The Jumbo Book of Outdoor Art, 2006
- I Can Paint!, 2007
- I Can Sculpt!, 2007
- I Can Draw!, 2008
- I Can Make Prints!, 2008
- I Can Build!, 2009
- I Can Collage!, 2009

== Awards ==
The Imaginary Garden

- 2010 USBBY Outstanding International Books Honour List
- 2009 The Governor General's Literary Awards, finalist

123 I Can Paint!

- 2008 CCBC Best Books for Kids and Teens, winner
- 2007 Ontario Library Association Best Bets Non-Fiction, winner

123 I Can Sculpt!

- 2008 CCBC Best Books for Kids and Teens, winner

The Jumbo Book of Art

- 2004 Disney Adventures Book Award, winner, best hands-on book
- 2003 National Parenting Publications Awards (NAPPA) for Children's Resources, Gold Award winner
- 2003 Best Bets, Ontario Library Association

The Jumbo Book of Outdoor Art

- 2006 Disney Adventures Book Award, shortlisted

The Not-So-Faraway Adventure

- 2016 Best Books for Kids and Teens, Canadian Children's Book Centre, Winner
