= Nadia Hohn =

Canadian educator and author

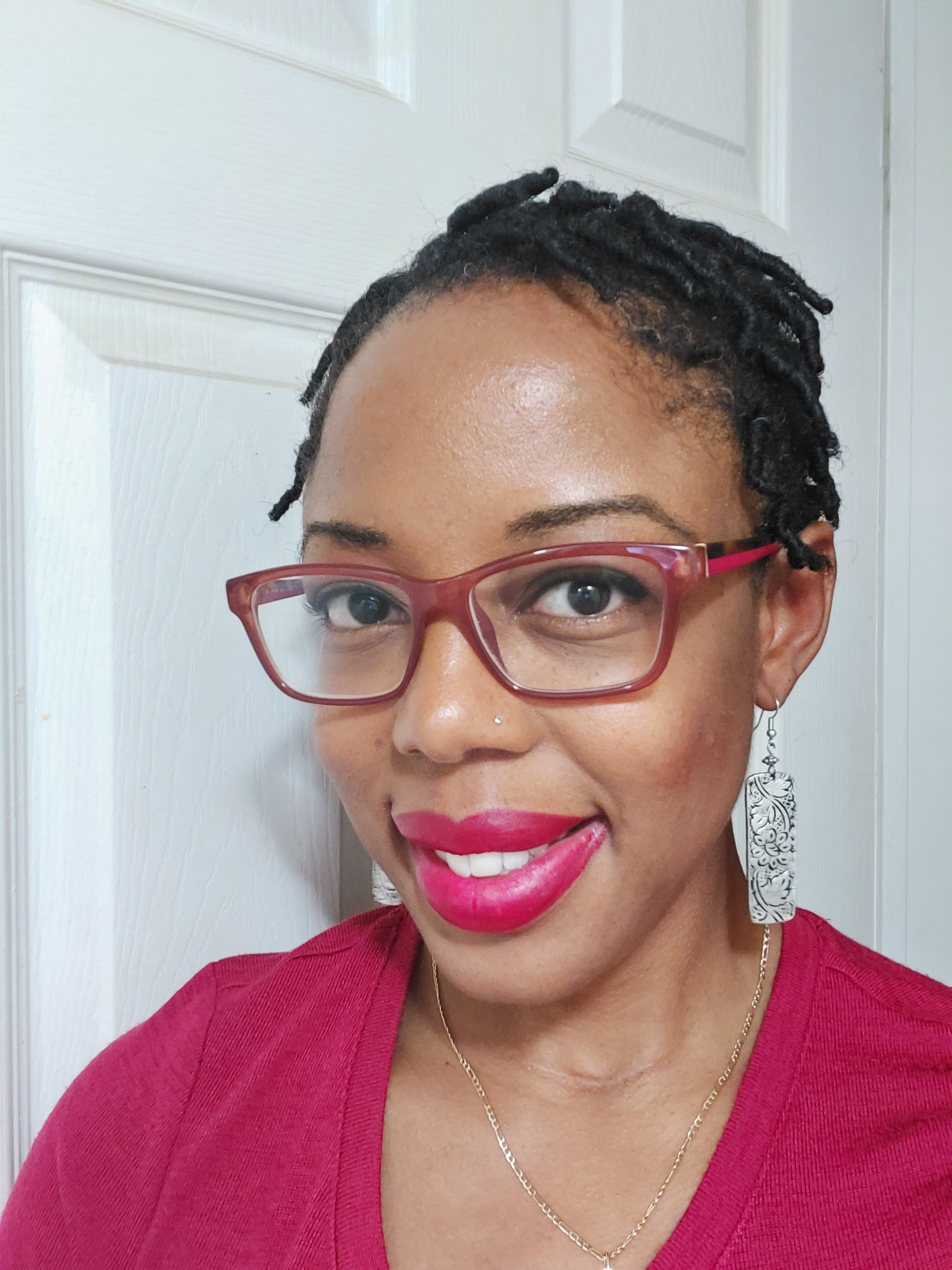
- Portrait of the author (2020)
- Born: Nadia L. Hohn
- Education: BA (Honour’s Psychology) University of Waterloo, BEd (Education) and MEd (Sociology and Equity Studies in Education) Ontario Institute for Studies in Education at the University of Toronto (OISE/UT), MFA (Creative Writing) University of Guelph
- Occupations: Educator, writer
- Writing career
- Genre: Children's literature
- Notable works: Malaika's Costume, A Likkle Miss Lou
- Website: Official website

Nadia L. Hohn is a Canadian educator and children's book author. She has earned critical acclaim for her books for young readers, including her debut picture book, Malaika's Costume.

== Biography ==
Born in Canada to Jamaican immigrant parents, Hohn grew up and currently lives in Toronto, Ontario, where she is an elementary school teacher. At age 6, she began writing and illustrating her own books. As a high school student, she wrote for her school paper, and later began contributing to university and community newspapers. At age 20, she obtained an internship in New York City, writing articles for Psychology Today.

In 2001, Hohn founded and organized the first ICED IN BLACK: Canadian Black Experiences on Film, film festival. This festival focused on films by and/or about Black Canadians. She turned this event into an annual nationally touring festival which went to 7 cities in 2002 and by 2003, its final year, 9 cities (Toronto, Waterloo, Ottawa, Montreal, Halifax, Edmonton, Winnipeg, Vancouver, Victoria). Hohn worked and volunteered with other film festivals including the Toronto International Film Festival (TIFF), TIFF Kids (formerly Sprockets Film Festival), and Get Reel Film Festival. In 2009, Hohn became one of the inaugural teachers at the Africentric Alternative School in Toronto. This was Canada’s first publicly-funded school of its kind.

In 2010, Hohn enrolled in a course on writing for children at George Brown College in Toronto, where she wrote a first draft of Malaika's Costume. Later that year, she was diagnosed with thyroid cancer, an experience she has said spurred her ambition to have her writing published. Her first two books, Music and Media, were published by Rubicon as part of its Sankofa Series in 2015.

Hohn's debut picture book, Malaika's Costume, was published in 2016. The book, illustrated by Irene Luxbacher, tells the story of a young girl preparing to celebrate Carnival in the Caribbean, while her mother is away working in Canada. The manuscript for Malaika's Costume won the Helen Isobel Sissons Canadian Children's Story Award, which recognizes diversity in children's literature. The book also earned an Honourable Mention at the 2017 Américas Award for Children's and Young Adult Literature, from the Consortium of Latin American Studies Programs.

In a follow-up, Malaika's Winter Carnival, the protagonist adapts to a new life in Canada. A Kirkus review of the book wrote that Hohn "contrasts Caribbean and Canadian cultures tenderly, with deep understanding of both".

From 2016 to 2017, Hohn went to travel and teach in Abu Dhabi and Dubai. During this time, she worked on drafts of Harriet Tubman: Freedom Fighter, an early reader published by Harper Collins Children's Books in 2018. In 2019, Hohn's picture book biography of Jamaican poet Louise Bennett Coverley, A Likkle Miss Lou: How Jamaican Poet Louise Bennett Coverley Found Her Voice, was published by Owlkids. It was named one of the best Canadian children's books of 2019 by CBC Books.

Hohn has instructed creative writing for children courses at the University of Toronto School for Continuing Studies (UTSCS), University of Guelph Open University, and Centennial College. She has presented at schools, libraries, conferences, festivals, and bookstores in Jamaica, Trinidad and Tobago, The United Arab Emirates, The United Kingdom, The United States, and across Canada.

== Works ==
=== Fiction ===
- Malaika's Costume (2016), illustrated by Irene Luxbacher - ISBN 9781554987542
- Malaika's Winter Carnival (2017), illustrated by Irene Luxbacher - ISBN 9781554989201
- Malaika's Surprise (2021), illustrated by Irene Luxbacher - ISBN 9781773062648
- Malaika, Carnival Queen (2023), illustrated by Irene Luxbacher - ISBN 1773068504
- Getting Us to Grandma's (2024), illustrated by TeMika Grooms - ISBN 9781773066899
- Patty Dreams (2025), illustrated by Sahle Robinson - ISBN 9781771476027

=== Non-Fiction ===
- contribution in T DOT GRIOTS: An Anthology of Toronto's Black Storytellers (2004), ISBN 978-1553956310
- Music (2015), ISBN 9781770589452
- Media (2015), ISBN 9781770588349
- Harriet Tubman: Freedom Fighter (2018), illustrated by Gustavo Mazali - ISBN 9780062432858
- A Likkle Miss Lou: How Jamaican Poet Louise Bennett Coverley Found Her Voice (2019), illustrated by Eugenie Fernandes - ISBN 9781771473507
- 'Kwanzaa" in Celebrate with Me!: Recipes, Crafts, and Holiday Fun from Around the World by Laura Gladwin - ISBN 978-1419763014
- 'Louise Go A Country' in 100+ Plus Voices for Miss Lou: Poetry, Tributes, Interviews, Essays by Opal Palmer Adisa - ISBN 978-9766408879
- The Antiracist Kitchen: 21 Stories (and Recipes) (2023), illustrated by Roza Nozari - ISBN 9781459833432
