= Mohamed Abdulkarim Ali =

Somali-Canadian writer

- Born: 1985 (age 40–41); Mogadishu
- Occupation: Writer

Mohamed Abdulkarim Ali is a Somali-Canadian writer. Ali wrote his first book, a memoir, Angry Queer Somali Boy, while living in a shelter for homeless men in Toronto.

== Early life ==
Ali was born in a traditional Somali family in Somalia in 1985. His estranged father took him from his mother when he was young, and Ali then lived with his father, step-mother, and step-sisters in Abu Dhabi. His step-mother then lied to apply for refugee status in The Netherlands.

While still a youth, his family immigrated to Canada. Ali developed problems with over-using drugs and alcohol.

== Writing career ==
The CBC described his book in an article on important books on mental health.

The Advocate described his book in an article on "The Best LGBTQ Memoirs of 2019".

The CBC placed his book on their recommended reading list for the winter of 2020.
