= Marguerite Poland =

South African writer (born 1950)

Marguerite Poland OIS
- Born: 3 April 1950 (age 76); Gauteng, South Africa
- Occupation: Novelist
- Spouse: Martin Oosthuizen
- Children: Sue Oosthuizen and Verlie Oosthuizen

Marguerite Poland OIS (born 3 April 1950, Johannesburg) is a South African writer and author of eleven children's books.

== Early life ==
When she was two years old, the Poland family relocated to the Eastern Cape where she spent most of her formative years. After completing her secondary education at St Dominic's Priory School in Port Elizabeth, Poland completed her Bachelor of Arts degree at Rhodes University, majoring in Social Anthropology and Xhosa. In 1971, Marguerite Poland completed her honours degree in African languages at Stellenbosch University. In 1977 she obtained her master's degree in Zulu literature specialising in Zulu folktales – her field of speciality being cattle. In 1997 she was awarded her PhD, her doctoral thesis was 'A Descriptive Study of the Sanga-Nguni Cattle of the Zulu People' – from the University of Natal. She also has an Honours degree in Comparative African Languages and an MA and PhD in Zulu Literature from the University of KwaZulu-Natal.

== Personal life ==
Poland also worked as a social worker in Port Elizabeth and in Durban. Poland also worked as an ethnologist at the Iziko South African Museum in Cape Town. Most recently she taught English for a year at St. Andrew's College in Grahamstown, where she was commissioned to write a history of the school to mark the 150th anniversary of its foundation in 2005. The resulting publication The Boy in You: a Biography of St Andrew's College, Grahamstown 1855–2005 was launched in South Africa and London in 2008. Poland is married to attorney, Martin Oosthuizen, who was also raised in the Eastern Cape and attended St Andrew's College. They have two daughters and four grandchildren and divide their time between Durban and Grahamstown where she acts as historian to the college.

== Creative work ==
Among her works are The Mantis and the Moon and Woodash Stars for both of which she received the Percy FitzPatrick Award, the first two books to receive this award. The Mantis and the Moon also received the Sankei Honorable Award for translation into Japanese. In 1984 she published The Small Clay Bull (David Philip) and The Story of the Fiery Necked Nightjar (Ravan Press). She has written five adult novels. The Train to Doringbult was short listed for the CNA Awards and Shades for the M-Net Award. Shades has been a matriculation set work for over a decade throughout South Africa. It was translated into Dutch as Schimmenspel in 2015 (Mozaïek Publishers). Her third novel, Iron Love, draws much of its inspiration from the lives of a group of boys just prior to the Great War of 1914–1918. A stage adaption written and directed by Ingrid Wylde appeared at the National Arts Festival in Grahamstown in 2006. Her more recent works, Recessional for Grace and The Abundant Herds: a Celebration of the Nguni Cattle of the Zulu People have been adapted for documentary films. Her novel, The Keeper was published in 2014 and translated into Afrikaans by Daniel Hugo, titled Die Bewaker. This was followed in October 2019 by A Sin of Omission, an historical novel set in the Eastern Cape. Her anthology, The St Andrew's College Chapel - a history: 1955-2018 was published in 2018. Over the years her work has been translated into several languages including Afrikaans, Dutch, French, and Japanese. She was chosen to appear in Twentieth Century Children's Writers, the 'International Who's Who', published by Cambridge University Press and is a featured writer in the KZN Literary Tourism project.

== Awards ==
Marguerite Poland is the recipient of two national Lifetime Achievement Awards for English literature; one from the Department of Arts and Culture in 2005 and then in 2010 from the South African Literary Awards.

Poland was the first recipient of the Percy FitzPatrick Award for children's literature in 1979 for The Mantis and the Moon and in 1983 she won the award again for Woodash Stars. In 1984 she received the Japanese Sankei Honourable Award for The Mantis and the Moon in translation.

Train to Doringbult was shortlisted for the CNA Award in 1988 and in 1994 Shades was shortlisted for the M-Net Award. In 2013 Taken Captive by Birds was shortlisted for the Nielsen Booksellers' Choice Award.

Poland received the Nielsen Booksellers' Choice Award in 2015 for her novel, The Keeper: This prize is given to the title that South Africa's booksellers most enjoyed reading, promoting and selling in 2014.

In 2015 she won the Ingwazi Award for contribution to the cultural history of KwaZulu-Natal.

On 28 April 2016, the Order of Ikhamanga - Silver (OIS) was conferred on Marguerite Poland‚ for "her excellent contribution to the field of indigenous languages, literature and anthropology".

== Works ==
=== Novels ===
- Train to Doringbult. Bodley Head. 1987. ISBN 9780370310510. (shortlisted for the CNA Award).
- Shades. Penguin. 2012. ISBN 978-0-14-302713-3. (shortlisted for the M-Net Award)
- Iron Love. Penguin. 2012. ISBN 978-0-14-302699-0.
- Recessional for Grace. Penguin. 2012. ISBN 978-0-14-352864-7. This novel has been translated into French as Cantique pour Grace
- The Keeper. Penguin. 2014. ISBN 978-0-14-353903-2. This novel has been translated into Afrikaans as Die Bewaker
- A Sin of Omission. Penguin (South Africa). 2019.
- A Sin of Omission. EnvelopeBooks (UK/ROI). 5 May 2022.

=== Non-fiction ===
- The abundant herds: a celebration of the cattle of the Zulu people. Fernwood. 2003. ISBN 978-1-874950-71-4. with David Hammond-Took, illustrated by Leigh Voigt
- The Boy in You: A Biography of St. Andrew's College, 1855–2005. Fernwood Press. 2008. ISBN 978-1-874950-86-8.
- Taken Captive by Birds. Penguin Books Limited. 2012. ISBN 978-0-14-352985-9., illustrated by Craig Ivor
- The St Andrew's College Chapel, a History : 1855-2018. Privately published. 2018.

=== Children's books ===
- Die Muis Sonder Snorbaard. Tafelberg. 1979. ISBN 978-0-624-01289-4.
- Die Bidsprikaan en die Maan, 1981
- Once at KwaFubesi. Leigh Voigt. Ravan Press. 1981. ISBN 978-0-86975-201-2.
- The Bush Shrike, 1982, Raven Press
- As die boerboonblomme val en ander verhale. Tafelberg -Uitg. 1982. ISBN 978-0-624-01753-0.
- The Wood-ash Stars. David Philip. 1983. ISBN 978-0-908396-98-6. Percy FitzPatrick Award
- Die vuurkoolsterre. Human & Rousseau (Edms) Bpk. 1983. ISBN 978-0-7981-1634-3.
- Marcus and the Boxing Gloves. Cora Coetzee. Tafelberg. 1984. ISBN 978-0-624-02253-4.
- The Small Clay Bull,1984, David Philip
- The Story of the Fiery Necked Nightjar, 1984, Raven Press
- The Mantis and the Moon: Stories for the Children of Africa. Ravan Press. 1985. ISBN 978-0-86850-115-4. Percy FitzPatrick Award
- Shadow of the Wild Hare. Leigh Voigt. D. Philip. 1986. ISBN 978-0-86486-073-6.
- Nqalu, the Mouse with No Whiskers. Tafelberg. 1987. ISBN 978-0-624-02554-2.
- Marcus and the Go-kart. Tafelberg. 1988. ISBN 978-0-624-02452-1.
- Sambane's Dream. Leigh Voigt. Penguin Books. 1989. ISBN 978-0-14-012849-9.

=== Anthologies ===
Contributed to:

- South Africa 27 April 1994 Ed. Andre Brink, 1994 Quellerie
- 27 April, One Year Later. Ed Andre Brink, 1995 Quellerie
- Madiba Magic, date? Tafelberg
- Keersy/Crossing Over, Stories from a new South Africa compiled by Linda Rode and Jakes Gerwel
