= Jacqueline Beaugé-Rosier =

Haitian poet (born 1932)

- Born: February 7, 1932
- Died: August 3, 2016 (aged 84)
- Education: Institution Notre-Dame-de-Lourdes Algonquin College Université du Québec à Hull Ottawa University
- Occupations: Educator and writer
- Years active: 1957–2000
- Spouse: Jacques V. Rosier
- Awards: Trophée de la Tonnelle Haïtienne de l'Ouataouais Second prize in a literary competition sponsored by Société des écrivains canadiens de Toronto 1933 Plaque d'Honneur from the Haitian community of Canada, 2000

Jacqueline Beaugé-Rosier (February 7, 1932 - August 3, 2016) was a Haitian-born educator and writer living in Ontario, Canada.

== Biography ==
She was born Jacqueline Beaugé in Jérémie, Haiti and was educated at the Institution Notre-Dame-de-Lourdes there. She entered a convent at Kenscoff but left for health reasons. She then trained as a teacher at Notre-Dame-de-Lourdes, graduating in 1952. She taught at Édmée-Rey school until 1953, then at the Lycée Pétion in Port-au-Prince until 1969 and at the Collège Roger Anglade from 1971 to 1975. After she married Jacques V. Rosier, she left Haiti and settled in Canada. She continued her studies at Algonquin College, at the Université du Québec à Hull and at Ottawa University, earning a master's degree in French literature. She then taught school in Ottawa until her retirement in 2004.

From 1957 to 1962, Beaugé-Rosier was associated with the "Haïti littéraire" poets and, from 1964 to 1966, she was a member of the literary group Houghenikon. In Canada, she became a member of the Association des Auteures et auteurs francophones d'Ontario.

In 1991, she received the Trophée de la Tonnelle Haïtienne de l'Ouataouais. In 1993, she was awarded second prize in a literary competition sponsored by the Société des écrivains canadiens de Toronto. In 2000, she received the Plaque d'Honneur from the Haitian community of Canada for her contributions to Franco-Ontarian literature and to Haitian-Canadian cultural development.

Jacqueline Beaugé-Rosier died in Ottawa, Ontario, Canada. The obituary was featured in Ottawa Citizen on August 4, 2016.

== Selected works ==
- Climats en marche, poetry (1962)
- À Vol d'ombre, poetry (1966)
- Les Cahiers de la mouette, poetry and stories (1983)
- D'Or vif et de pain, poetry (1992)
- Les Yeux de l'anse du Clair, novel (2001)
