= Kagiso Lesego Molope =

Indigenous South African-Canadian novelist and playwright

Kagiso Lesego Molope is an Indigenous South African Canadian novelist and playwright. Born and raised in South Africa, Kagiso Lesego Molope graduated from the University of Cape Town and moved to Canada at age 21. She obtained her master's degree in English Literature from Carleton University. She was the first Black author to win the Percy FitzPatrick Award. She was also the first Black novelist to win the Ottawa Book Award in 2019. Her first Novel, Dancing in the Dust, was the first novel by an Indigenous South African author to be on the IBBY List. McClelland & Stewart has acquired world rights to her fifth novel We Inherit the Fire. In 2019, Molope also won the Pius Adesanmi Memorial Award, for her book Such A Lovely, Lonely Road.

On May 7, 2024 Molope was invited to the Politics and Pen Gala a fundraiser hosted by the Writers Trust. During the gala Molope made a speech regarding the death toll and humitarian costs of Israels military campaign in Gaza. Her speech was met with boos and heckles from the audience. When she returned to her seat she was escorted out by security. The Writers Trust later apologized for her treatment.

== Selected works ==
- Dancing in the Dust, Mawenzi House, 2002
- The Mending Season, Oxford University Press, 2005
- This Book Betrays My Brother, Mawenzi House, 2018
- Such a Lonely Lovely Road, Mawenzi House, 2018
- Maya Angelou: Black Woman Rising, Play. Nordic Black Theatre, 2019-2023

== Awards and honours ==
- 2014 Winner, Percy FitzPatrick Award (for This Book Betrays My Brother)
- 2019 Winner, Ottawa Book Award (for This Book Betrays My Brother)
- 2021, 2022, 2023, 2024 Nominee, Astrid Lindgren Memorial Award
