= Albert Kiralfy =

Albert Kenneth Roland Kiralfy, FKC (1915–2001) was a legal scholar. He was Professor of Law at King's College London from 1964 to 1981.

Born in 1915, he studied law at King's College London from 1932 to 1935, when he graduated with an LLB; the following year, he was awarded the LLM degree, and remained at King's as an assistant lecturer until 1939. After serving in the Second World War, he returned to his former position at King's in 1947, and the following year became a full lecturer. He completed a doctorate in 1949, and was promoted to a readership in 1951 before becoming Professor of Law in 1964. He retired in 1981, having been appointed a Fellow of King's College London in 1971.

Kiralfy co-edited (with Harold Potter) the eighth edition of Goodeve's Modern Law of Personal Property in 1937, and published a monograph, The Action on the Case in 1951. He edited the fourth edition of Potter's Historical Introduction to English Law in 1958. He was also "one of the pioneers of the study of Soviet and Russian law in England", and translated Russian civil codes to English.

Kiralfy died in April 2001.

== See also ==
- J. H. Baker, "Kiralfy's The Action on the Case", The Journal of Legal History, vol. 16, no. 3 (1995), pp. 231–233.
