= Amatoritsero Ede =

Nigerian-Canadian poet

- Other name: Godwin Ede
- Occupation: Poet

Amatoritsero "Godwin" Ede is a Nigerian-Canadian poet. He had written under the name "Godwin Ede" but he stopped bearing his Christian first name as a way to protest the xenophobia and racism he noted in Germany, a "Christian" country, and to an extent, to protest Western colonialism in general. Ede has lived in Canada since 2002, sponsored as a writer-in-exile by PEN Canada. He was a Hindu Monk with the Hare Krishna Movement, and has worked as a book editor with a major Nigerian trade publisher, Spectrum Books.

Ede is the publisher and managing editor of Maple Tree Literary Supplement (MTLS). Between 2005 and 2007, he edited an international online poetry journal, Sentinel Poetry Online. He was the 2005–2006 Writer-in-Residence at Carleton University, Ottawa, Canada, under the auspices of PEN Canada's Writer-in-Exile network. He was also a SSHRC Fellow and Doctoral Candidate in English literature at Carleton University, from which he received in his PhD in 2013. His doctoral thesis was titled "The Global Literary Canon and Minor African Literatures", a cultural materialist analysis of the subordination of contemporary African literature to the metropolitan canon. He has a BA and MA in Postcolonial Anglophone Literatures and German Linguistics from the University of Hanover, Germany.

== Prizes ==
- 1993: Runner-up prize of the Association of Nigerian Authors' (ANA) Poetry Competition with the manuscript of "A Writer's Pains."
- 1998: Won the All-Africa Christopher Okigbo Prize for Literature with his first collection of poems
- 1998: Won the ANA All Africa Christopher Okigbo Prize for Literature (endowed by Wole Soyinka, Nigerian Nobel Laureate for literature) with his first collection of poems
- 2004: Won second prize in the first May Ayim Award: International Black German Literary Prize.
- 2013: Nigeria Prize for Literature Longlist

== Publications ==
=== Research articles ===
- 2015: "Narrative Moment and Self-Anthropologizing Discourse". Research in African Literatures. Vol. 46.3 (2015): 112–129.
- 2016: "The Politics of Afropolitanism". Journal of African Cultural Studies. Special Issue on Afropolitanism. 28.1 (20 January 2016): 88–100.

=== Poetry collections ===
- 2009: Globetrotter & Hitler's Children (New York: Akaschic Books, 2009).
- 1998: Collected Poems: A Writer's Pains & Caribbean Blues (Bremen, Germany: Yeti Press, 1998; Lagos, Nigeria: Oracle Books, 2002).

=== Poems in anthologies ===
- 2014: "Pro-rogue". Poems for a Century: An Anthology on Nigeria. Tope Omoniyi, ed. Dakar, Senegal: Amalion, 2014: 83.
- 2014: "Winter Morning" in On Broken Wings: An anthology of Best Contemporary Nigerian Poetry. Unoma Azuah, ed. USA: DeLite Press, 2014: 88.
- 2014: "Mother and Child" in Onomonresoa: An Anthology of Nigerian Poets on Mothers and Motherhood. Obari Gomba, ed. Lagos: Hornbill, 2014: 162–164.
- 2010: "Pro-rogue". Rogue Stimulus: The Stephen Harper Anthology for a Prorogued Parliament. Toronto: Mansfield, 2010:45
- 2007: "Exile". Songs for Wonodi. Dike Okoro, ed. London: Malthouse, 2007:61.
- 2006: "Globetrotter". TOK 1: Writing the New Toronto, Helen Walsh, ed. (Toronto: Zephyr Press, 2006): 102.
- 2006: "Not in Love". Camouflage: Best of Contemporary Nigerian Writing Nduka Otiono & Diego Okonyedo eds (Yenogoa, Nigeria: Treasure Books, 2006): 122–126.
- 2004: "The Skinhead's Lords Prayer." May Ayim Award Anthology, Peggy Piesche et al. eds (Berlin, Germany: Orlanda Verlag, 2004): 69.
- 1996: "Beside the Lagoon" & "Rhythm". Und auf den Strassen eine Pest. Uche Nduka, ed. (Bad Honnef, Germany: Horlemann Verlag, 1996): 39–40.
- 1988: "Song" in Voices from the Fringe: An ANA Anthology of New Nigerian Poetry. Harry Garuba, ed. (Lagos: Malthouse Press, 1988):2.
- 1989: "A Writer's Pains". The Fate of Vultures: BBC Prize-Winning Poetry. Peter Porter et al., eds (Oxford: Heinemann International, 1989):31.

=== Poems in journals ===
- 2003: Poems in Versal 1. Amsterdam.
- 2006: Poems in Drum Voices Revue. Vol. 14, Issues 1 & 2: *2006:. Southern Illinois University, Edwardsville, USA.
- 2011–2012: Poems in African Writing. Issues 2, 3, 4, 7 & 8

=== Interviews (by George Elliott Clarke) ===
- 2010: "The Poet as Witness" in Arc Poetry Magazine. Issue 64.

=== Literary nonfiction in anthologies ===
- 2014: "The Peaceful "Trouble!"" in Mandela: Tributes to a Global Icon. Toyin Falola, ed. North Carolina: Carolina Academic P., 2014: 137

=== Literary nonfiction in journals ===
- 2015: "Wit and Witticisms". Maple Tree Literary Supplement, Issue 20.
- 2015: "Charlie Hebdo’s Ghost". Maple Tree Literary Supplement, Issue 19.
- 2014: "Ulli Beier: A Pagan Yoruba Man in Christian Bayreuth". Maple Tree Literary Supplement issue 18.
- 2014: "The Example of Mandela". Maple Tree Literary Supplement, Issue 17.
- 2013: "Experience; Inexperience and (Un)Canadian Poetics". Maple Tree Literary Supplement, Issue 16.
- 2013: "The Ree, the Roo, the Raa!; or Bene Bene Pendentes!". Maple Tree Literary Supplement, Issue 15.
- 2013: "World without End". Maple Tree Literary Supplement, Issue 14.
- 2012: "Sirens Knuckles Boots". Maple Tree Literary Supplement, Issue 13.
- 2012: "'Easing' the Arab Spring", in Maple Tree Literary Supplement, Issue 12.
- 2011: "Face Me; I Book You: The Arts and Asocial Media". Maple Tree Literary Supplement, Issue 10.
- 2011: "The Middle East is a Fiction". Maple Tree Literary Supplement, Issue 9.
- 2011: "How (Alfred) Noble is the Nobel Prize?". Maple Tree Literary Supplement, Issue 8.
- 2010: "Bakhtin the Poet". Maple Tree Literary Supplement, Issue 7.
- 2010: "Of Grammatology and Writing". Maple Tree Literary Supplement, Issue 5.
