= Valerie Mason-John =

English academic (born 1962)

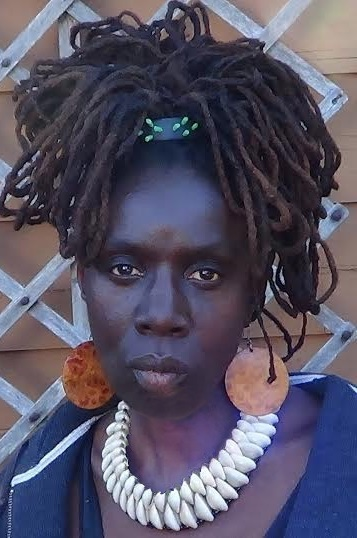
- Born: 22 November 1962 (age 63); Cambridge, England
- Education: Leeds University, Sussex University
- Occupations: Co-founder of Eight Step Recovery and Mindfulness Based Addiction Recovery
- Known for: Author and public speaker

Valerie Mason-John (born 22 November 1962) is an English academic and the co-founder of Eight Step Recovery – Using The Buddha's Teaching to Overcome Addiction, an alternative to the 12-step programmes for addiction.

== Thesis ==
Since the publication of the book by Windhorse Publications in 2013, it has been the recipient of a Best USA Book Award 2014 and Best International Book Award 2015 in the self-motivational and self-help category. Eight Step Meetings now take place in the UK, USA, Canada, India and Finland. Mason-John is also the co-creator of Mindfulness Based Addiction Recovery (MBAR), which was inspired by Mindfulness Based Cognitive Therapy for Depression by John D. Teasdale, Mark Williams, and Zindal Seagal.

Mason-John uses they/them pronouns and is a member of the LGBT community. They are the author of eight books and work as a public speaker in Mindfulness for Addiction and Emotional Well Being, and are a trainer in anti-bullying and conflict resolution. Valerie is ordained in the Triratna Buddhist Community, where they received their spiritual name, Vimalasara. They are also the chairperson of Triratna Vancouver Buddhist Centre. Their Buddhist name is Vimalasara, which means "she whose essence is stainless and pure". They used to be a freelance feature writer for The Voice newspaper and were also a performer and spoken-word poet using the stage name "Queenie". Black British by birth, they have now become a Canadian.

== Biography ==
Born in Cambridge, England, to Sierra Leone Creole parents, Mason-John spent their childhood "in care" — in foster homes and childcare facilities, including the Barnardo's Orphanages in Britain, with the exception of a short time spent living with their mother in their early teens. Mason-John dropped out before receiving their undergraduate degree in the 1980s, but continued to pursue post-graduate education and training until the present. Since the early 1990s, they have worked as a writer, performing artist and lecturer. They received a teaching certificate from London South Bank University, and currently conduct seminars in anger management and conflict resolution.

After 18 months of studying philosophy and politics at Leeds University during the 1980s, Mason-John studied post-graduate journalism, earned an MFA in creative writing and diploma in theatrical performance at Sussex University and The Desmond Jones School. By 2003, their interest in counseling and their ordination into the Western Buddhist Order led them to writing and performing, and training themselves and others in anger management and conflict resolution. In December 2007, Mason-John was named Honorary Doctor of Letters by the University of East London. Mason-John continues to write, work as a self-awareness trainer; they perform and lecture internationally.

== Publication, broadcasting, and academic work ==
Mason-John's work has appeared in UK and international journalistic and scholarly publications such as The Guardian, The Voice, Curve Magazine, The Morning Star, Pink Paper, Girl Friend Magazine and Wasafiri. They have also contributed to Half the Earth: Women's Experience of Travel Worldwide (second edition, Pandora Rough Guide, 1990), Frauen Zimmerim Haus Europa (Papyrosa, 1991), Assaults on Convention (Cassell, 1995), Words from Word Up Café (Centerprise Publications, 1993), and Tell Tales (Tell Tales/Flipped Eye Publications, 2005).

Mason-John was the editor of Feminist Arts News from 1992 to 1997. Additionally, they were the artistic director of the London Mardi Gras from 1997 to 2000, and spent four years as the director of the Pride Arts Festival. Their television credits include freelance work for the BBC, Channel 4 and Vis International TV; they have also been featured on British radio broadcasts for the BBC World Service and the regional programmes Midweek, Woman's Hour and The Shelagh Rogers Show Next Chapter on CBC Radio.

In addition to their work in broadcasting and journalism, Mason-John embarked on a career in theatre. Having studied at the Desmond Jones School of Mime and Physical Theatre, they began performing and writing for the stage by 1998. Focusing on one-woman plays, they developed a body of work, including Sin Dykes, Brown Girl in the Ring, The Adventures of Snow Black and Rose Red and You Got Me, among other plays.

Their first novel Borrowed Body (2005), which was later relaunched as The Banana Kid (2007), received the Mind Book of the Year Award. Since, Mason-John has authored six books including their spiritual non-fiction Detox Your Heart (2006), which was slated for revision in 2017.

== The Great Black North ==
In 2012, Mason-John alongside spoken-word artist Kevan Anthony Cameron co-edited the anthology The Great Black North: Contemporary African Canadian Poetry, published by Frontenac House, featuring more than 90 poets. The Great Black North was one of the first complete poetry collections of contemporary Black Canadian poets. Notable poets in the anthology include George Elliott Clarke, M. Nourbese Philip, Wayde Compton, Sylvia Hamilton, Olive Senior, Fredrick Ward and d'bi Young. The anthology is unique in the way it categorizes "page" and "stage" poetry, as a means to honour both the written and oral traditions of poets from the African Diaspora.

== Published works ==
- 1992–97: Editor of Feminist Arts News
- 1992: Black Art and Culture on the Mainland of Europe: France, Belgium, Germany, Netherlands, Spain (editor), Arts Council of England
- 1993: Lesbians Talk: Making Black Waves (co-author with Ann Khambatta) Scarlet Press, ISBN 9781857270075
- 1993: Words from the Women's Cafe: Lesbian Poetry from Word Up (contributor; eds Bernadette Halpin and Dorothea Smartt), Centerprise Publications, ISBN 978-0903738767
- 1994: Talking Black: Lesbians of African and Asian Descent Speak Out Anthology (editor), Cassell, ISBN 0304329657
- 1995: Assaults on Convention (contributor), Cassell, ISBN 978-0304328833
- 1999: Brown Girl in the Ring: Plays, Prose and Poems, Get A Grip
- 2005: Borrowed Body, Serpent's Tail, ISBN 1852428910
- 2005: Tell Tales (contributor), Tell Tales/Flipped Eye Publication, ISBN 1905233027
- 2006: Detox Your Heart, Windhorse Publications, ISBN 9781899579655
- 2007: Black British Aesthetic, edited by Victoria Arana – contributor, ISBN 978-1443806015
- 2008: Broken Voices Ex Untouchable Women Speak Out, ISBN 978-8183860734
- 2012: The Great Black North - Contemporary African Canadian Poetry (edited with Kevan Anthony Cameron), ISBN 978-1897181836
- 2013: New edition of Borrowed Body, Demeter Press Canada, ISBN 978-1927335369
- 2014: Eight Step Recovery - Using The Buddha's Teachings to Overcome Addiction – co author, ISBN 978-1909314023
- 2017: New revised expanded edition of Detox Your Heart - Meditations for Emotional Trauma, ISBN 9781614293873
- 2020: I Am Still Your Negro: An Homage to James Baldwin. Canada: University of Alberta Press, ISBN 9781772125108

== Prizes and awards ==
- 2000: Windrush Achievement Award Arts and Community Pioneer
- 2001: Winner of the Black, Asian and Chinese Shoreline/Cultureword First Chapter Award
- 2005: Young Minds Book Award (shortlist) (for Borrowed Body)
- 2006/7: Grant For The Arts – Arts Council England
- 2006: Winner Mind Book of The Year Award (for Borrowed Body)
- 2007: Black LGBT Community Award
- 2007: Honorary Doctorate for Life time Achievements - Doctor of Letters
- 2014: Alberta's Book Awards Best Educational Book (for The Great Black North)
- 2014: The Best USA Book Award (for Eight Step Recovery)
- 2014: The Robert Kroetsch Poetry Award (for The Great Black North)
- 2015: The Best International Book Award (for Eight Step Recovery)
