= Althea Prince =

Black Canadian author, editor and professor

- Born: 1945 (age 80–81)
- Occupations: author and professor
- Employer: Toronto Metropolitan University

Althea Prince (born 1945) is a Black Canadian author, editor, and professor. Her novels and non-fiction essays are known for exploring themes of love, identity, the impact of migration, and finding a sense of belonging in Canada. She is the sister of Ralph Prince and five others.

Born in Antigua, Althea Prince has resided in Canada since the 1960s. She has taught sociology, first at York University and later at the University of Toronto. Currently, she teaches Caribbean Studies at the Chang School of Continuing Education at Toronto Metropolitan University. In 2011, she won the Kay Livingston Award from Ryerson University for excellence in teaching and mentoring students.

== Awards ==
In 2012, she was shortlisted as one of Canadian Immigrants Top 25 Immigrants. From 2002 to 2005, Dr. Prince was Managing Editor of the publishing company Canadian Scholars' Press & Women's Press.

She has been described as "a stellar African Canadian intellectual and writer" by reviewers. Her literary awards include the Children's Book Centre "Choice" Award for her children's book How the Star Fish Got to the Sea. In 2007, she was recognized by the Government of Antigua and awarded the Antigua and Barbuda International Writers' Festival First Annual Award for Literary Excellence for services to the arts and literature.

In 2014, the Canadian arts body the Harbourfront Centre named Prince as a "Canadian Literary Pioneer".

== Politics and community organizing ==
An author who is active in the community with organizations, Prince is currently listed in the Who's Who in Black Canada. As a community activist, she has received awards from the Ontario Arts Council to work with local women's organizations conducting life writing workshops with immigrant women and girls to bring their voices into mainstream literature. She has edited two anthologies: Beyond the Journey (2013) and ReImaging the Sky (2012). Prince has commented on the importance of bringing newcomer voices into the Canadian lexicon through teaching life writing and publishing diverse newcomer authors: "It is important for them to find their voice within... Immigrants' confidence is shaken when moving to a new place. The voice within the writing helps them feel acknowledged."

Dr. Prince has commented on issues of cultural identity on the CBC, exploring issues of anti-discrimination and the politics of Black women's hair. She has listed some of her favorite authors, including The New Yorker's, Malcolm Gladwell and children's author Itah Sadu.

== Critical reception ==
Canadian literary critics have lauded her fiction for writing "with such sensuality and grace that it creates a heady spell, drawing the reader into the center of the story", but January Magazine has also critiqued her work for having so many competing literary themes that her novels "lack a true magnetic center". The Canadian literary magazine Quill & Quire called her writing style "a mixture of polemic and memoir – that makes Prince's essays provocative and politically engaging – is not suited to fiction".

However, other critics have compared her academic essays to her contemporaries bell hooks and Audre Lorde, noting "Prince references histories that are too often eclipsed or erased in accounts of African Canadians in the big city." Her essays on anti-racism, gender and oppression, which were collected in the book Being Black are reminiscent of Audre Lorde's often cited "The Master's Tools Will Never Dismantle the Master's House". This body of scholarship has supported the development of third-wave feminism in Canada and in the academy.

In her 2001 academic text for women's studies, Feminisms and Womanisms: A Women's Studies Reader, Prince collaborated with both second-wave and third-wave feminists to capture the ongoing debates around intersections of gender, class, sexual orientation, immigration and race. Featured authors included Simone de Beauvoir, Betty Friedan, Margaret Cho, Angela Davis and Vandana Shiva.

One reviewer writes about Prince's essay "Racism Revisited": "Prince describes first-hand the racism she experienced while viewing an apartment. After showing Prince the apartment, the landlady explained that Prince would be unable to rent the apartment because she would be forced to share a bedroom with a white tenant. Prince did not mind this, but as she spoke further with the landlady, she realized that her level of comfort was not the issue in question. Prince recalls: "It finally penetrated my conscious that I was being told that my skin colour made me an undesirable person" (29). With this essay, Prince delivers a strong message as she learns that her skin colour matters more to others than it does to herself."

== Works ==
=== Anthologies ===
- Althea Prince, et al.. Feminisms and Womanisms: A Women's Studies Reader (2001). Canadian Scholars' Press.
- The Politics of Black Women's Hair (2009)
- In the Black (2012)
- Beyond the Journey (2013)
- Beyond the Journey: Women's Stories of Settlement and Community Building in Canada (2014)
- The Black Notes: Fresh Writing by Black Women and Girls (2017)

=== Fiction ===
- Loving This Man (2001)
- Ladies of the Night (2005)

=== Non-fiction ===
- Being Black (2001)

=== Children's literature ===
- How the Star Fish Got to the Sea
- How the East Pond Got Its Flowers (under name Althea Trotman)
