= Cilia Sawadogo =

Canadian-Burkinabé-German filmmaker

- Born: 1965 (age 59–60); Leipzig, Germany
- Education: Concordia University
- Occupation: Filmmaker
- Years active: 1989-present

Cilia Sawadogo (born 1965) is a Canadian-Burkinabé-German filmmaker.

== Biography ==
Born in Leipzig to a Burkinabé father and German mother, Sawadogo began studying animation techniques at Concordia University in Montreal, graduating in 1989 with a BA in communication studies and a minor in film animation. After graduating, she began to animate and make films professionally, first working on several animations for the American children's show Sesame Street from 1992-1993. In 1993, her first major work, La femme mariée à trios hommes (The woman with three husbands), was released and received several awards. Throughout the 1990s, she worked on numerous short animated films in collaboration with the National Film Board of Canada, and in 1995 she assisted with the film Jonas et Lisa. She is currently an associate professor of cinema at Concordia University and continues to produce animations, posters, and book illustrations.

== Filmography ==
The following is a list of short films by Sawadogo.

Film	Year released
La femme mariée à trios hommes (The Woman with Three Husbands)	1993
Naissance	1993
L'Arret d'autobus (The bus stop)	1994
Le Joueur de cora (The Cora Player)	1996
Christopher Changes his Name	2000
Christopher, Please Clean Up Your Room!	2001
L'Arbre aux esprits (The Tree of Spirits)	2005
