= Louise Uwacu =

Canadian writer and speaker

- Born: 1977 (age 48–49); Kabgayi, Rwanda
- Education: B.A. Political Science, Université du Québec à Montréal
- Occupations: Writer; speaker; documentary producer; CEO of POSITIVISION
- Known for: The Nightmare of a POSITIVISION; public speaking; founder of POSITIVISION

Louise Uwacu is a Canadian writer and speaker. Author of "The nightmare of a POSITIVISION*; Yes we are dying, but we are still breathing ". Published in the spring of 2009 by AuthorHouse. This book was published 15 years after she fled from Rwanda and became an international traveler on fake passports. She insists that her message is for the young people that will owe all that money their parents have borrowed from China and other banks of this world. In her own words: "This is the story of how I went from my mother's womb in Rwanda, grew into a rebellious teenager in Kenya, crossed through Europe and became a Fearless woman in North America. Through various travel tales and numerous encounters across three different continents; I am giving you the naked version of me and revealing the hidden side of our dramas and dreams"

== Biography ==
Louise Uwacu was born in Kabgayi, Rwanda, in February 1977. She spent her childhood and attended primary school in Kigali until 1988 when her family moved to Nairobi, Kenya. Where she continued her high school studies at the French school, Lycée Denis Diderot. Her family had just moved back to Rwanda, when shortly after the war, the massacres and genocide of 1994 erupted. After becoming a refugee, she landed in Montreal, Quebec, Canada in 1998 and lived there for 10 years. She currently resides in Vancouver, British Columbia, Canada. Uwacu holds a degree in political science from the University of Quebec in Montreal. It was at her graduation in 2002 that a speaker inspired her to "find out what you want to be before you take on the responsibilities of being that person".

Uwacu currently hosts the U&I Talk Show on ShawTV. She is also the co-founder and chief executive officer of the Canadian non-profit organization POSITIVISION. She has also produced and hosted a documentary titled Positivision in Mali, which follows her journey to the villages of Mali in January 2008.

Louise Uwacu has been quoted and featured in several publications, including The Guardian, Success for Women Magazine, The Boston Herald.

== The nightmare of a POSITIVISION ==
Louise Uwacu is a writer and advocate known for recounting her experience of war, child abuse, and family separation. She immigrates to Canada in 1998 as a 21 year old refugee, arriving with $30. She has written about the difficulties of adjusting to life after conflict, describing the process more challenging in some respects than the war itself. Uwacu has criticized politicians and beauty pageant contestants for invoking the phrase "world peace" without taking concrete action toward it. She promotes a personal philosophy she calls "POSITIVISION," which holds that of positive outlook is central to achieving success despite past hardship.

== Publications ==
- The Nightmare of a POSITIVISION: Yes We are Dying. But we are still Breathing, 2009
