= Ayoka =

- Gender: Female
- Language: Yoruba

Origin
- Origin: Nigeria
- Meaning: one who causes joy
- Region of origin: South western Nigeria

pronunciation=ion

Ayoka is a feminine given name commonly used in Nigeria and derived from the Yoruba language. It means "one who causes joy" or "one who causes joy all around".

== Notable Ayokas ==
- Ayoka Chenzira (born 1953), American filmmaker and television director
- Ayoka Olufunmilayo Adebambo, Nigerian professor of animal breeding and genetics
- Ayoka Lee (born 2000), American former basketball player
