= Rania El Mugammar =

Sudanese-Canadian Toronto-based artist, writer & activist

- Born: Toronto, Ontario, Canada
- Education: York University
- Occupations: Artist, writer, and activist
- Website: www.raniawrites.com

Rania El Mugammar is a Sudanese-Canadian Toronto-based artist, writer, anti-oppression and equity activist. She is the founder of SpeakSudan organization and is widely credited for her work The Anatomy of An Apology.

== Personal life ==
El Mugammar is a Black, queer, immigrant, Muslim woman. She grew up in the Regent Park and the St. James Town neighborhoods of Toronto. She has a son.

== Career ==
El Mugammar is the founder of the not-for-profit SpeakSudan. Collaborating with the Centre for Social Innovation in Toronto, she held public workshops called Shut It Uncle Bob! designed to help people tackle racism in their family. El Mugammar writes poetry and performs spoken word and oral storytelling on themes of belonging, Blackness, gender, identity, migration, sexuality, and womanhood.

El Mugammar's publication The Anatomy of an Apology has influenced academics and activists and been used as a benchmark to critique celebrity apologies.
