= Harold H. Potter =

Black Canadian Sociologist

Harold Herbert Potter (March 27, 1914 – May 8, 2004) was the first Canadian-born Black sociologist hired by a Canadian post-secondary institution when he was appointed lecturer in Sociology at Sir George Williams College (now part of Concordia University, Montréal, Canada) in 1947.

== Biography ==
=== Early life, family, and background ===
Born in Montréal, Harold H. Potter grew up in Little Burgundy, the home of Montréal's working-class, English-speaking Black community.

Potter was the son of Alfred Moore Westerby Potter (1885–1947) and Gertrude Miller Potter (1890–1979). Alfred and Gertrude were both émigrés from British Guiana (now Guyana) who—despite a Canadian immigration system that sought to deny entry to non-Whites—managed to make their way to Canada in 1907 and 1910 respectively. They were married in June 1913. Harold was their first child. He was followed by his two brothers, Donald Dinsmore Potter (1915–1976) and Calvin Cuthbert Potter (1919–1999).

The politics of overcoming racial prejudice was foundational to Potter's childhood. Alfred, Harold Potter's father, was a union-seeking redcap train station porter at Windsor Station in Montréal. It was not until 1943 that Alfred and other CNR porters received official union recognition and a first collective agreement. By 1919, Alfred was hosting the Montréal chapter of Marcus Garvey’s Universal Negro Improvement Association (UNIA) in the family home and attending conventions in Harlem. Alfred was the stock representative of the UNIA’s Black Star Line in Montréal and he used his position as a porter to relay UNIA information across the Canada-U.S. border. A letter directed to FBI director, J. Edgar Hoover, described Potter as Garvey's "right hand man". As the Montréal UNIA president in 1928, Potter informed a large gathering waiting to hear Garvey speak that the UNIA leader had been arrested by Canadian immigration officials. The following year, Potter travelled to Kingston, Jamaica where, adorned in "regal attire", he served as "His Highness the Potentate" for the first international UNIA convention. At the convention, Potter spoke of the conditions of Black Canadians and called on the UNIA to support Black-owned businesses. In 1936, Alfred vice-chaired the Fred Christie Defence Committee to support a Supreme Court challenge against the Montréal York Tavern for refusing to serve people on the basis of race. Alfred was also a partisan and executive member of the local Conservative Party. Stumping for one city council hopeful in 1926, Alfred paraphrased Booker T. Washington: "If you try to keep the Negro down [in Montréal] you will stay down too," said Alfred. "Don't think that the colored people live in a lower standard than anyone else, as that is false."

Gertrude, Harold Potter's mother, was also a leader in Montréal's Black Community. Gertrude was a volunteer fundraiser and a part-time worker for Charles Este's Negro Community Centre from its opening in 1927. Showing entrepreneurial savvy and a dedication to race solidarity, Gertrude also rented out rooms of the family's modest apartment to Black American tourists who would have been denied accommodation at local hotels. In 1955, Gertrude wrote a letter to the editor in support of racial equality and against the South African apartheid system. "Racism and nationalism are man's invention", she wrote, and they are "the product of selfishness and pride, and the excuse for keeping less fortunate people in subjection." Gertrude appealed to Christian notions of justice and truth and argued that since "equality should be based on merit" then "justice demands that all should be given the same opportunities".

Harold's brother, Calvin Cuthbert Potter, was among the first—if not the first—person of colour to be employed at Montréal City Hall. He served six years as a soldier in World War Two and was demobilized in 1946 at the rank of sergeant. Upon his return, he obtained a Bachelor of Commerce from Sir George Williams College, and master's degree and a PhD from McGill in 1954. He became a chartered accountant and a lecturer at McMaster University before finishing his career at Concordia University as the Chair of the Department of Finance. He received many awards for his involvement in the political struggle for an independent English education system in Quebec.

=== Education and early artistic achievements ===
Harold Potter was engaged in public life at an early age, especially within the Young Men's Christian Association (YMCA) and its Sir George Williams College on Drummond Street. At 14-years-old, Potter was winning piano awards and speaking contests at the YMCA. He was high school valedictorian in 1932.

Between 1935 and 1939 Potter received a B.A. from Sir George Williams College (SGWC). During his undergraduate degree, Potter received the French Government Bronze medal, the Hirschberg award for high scholastic standing, the Alumni Association award for significant contribution to student life, and the Board of Governors medal for creative expression. Over the summers, Potter worked as a camp counsellor at the YMCA Kamp Kanawana. Potter was editor of the Georgian, the newspaper of Sir George Williams College, in 1938–39, a position that would be held a decade later by novelist Mordecai Richler. "It was a dull, straight, serious and earnest newspaper," said Potter when the paper folded in 1980.

Potter composed "The Georgian Marching Song" in 1937, a SGWC hymn extolling the virtues of student life. He was also the co-producer, composer, and conductor of the "Georginatics" in 1939 and 1940, an annual song and dance revue. Songs from the 1939 "Georginatics" included "Fancy Meeting You" which satirized Hitler, Mussolini, Stalin, and Chamberlain working in a milk bar in the 1890s. Potter composed dozens of show, swing, and waltz tunes for the popular "Georginatics". As war broke out, Potter travelled with a YMCA ministrel troupe to military camps in Ontario and Quebec. As part of the "Lazy River Ministrels" Potter played the role of a "Tambo" endman. Potter's musical tastes ranged widely but he had a particular fondness for Bach, Liszt, and Chopin. He followed the careers of two Canadian musical prodigies, Oscar Peterson and Glenn Gould, closely. He would continue to play, or as he put it, "practice", the piano daily throughout his life.

=== Employment, Second World War, and post-war academic career ===
In the early 1940s, Potter worked in the Boys Work Department of the Central YMCA. He was also briefly the assistant to the Plant Manager at the Dominion Electric Protection Company. In recognition of his service to Sir George Williams College, Potter was elected to the Board of Governors as the alumni representative in 1942.

That same year, Potter enlisted in the Canadian Army. He started out in the Signal Corp infantry but ended up with the Canadian Army Organization Research Group, at the army base in Petawawa, Ontario, after an American research psychologist convinced Potter's commanding officer to reassign him. Potter spent the war designing instructional materials for recruits, illustrating educational booklets, and developing psychological reports. He demobbed as a sergeant.

In 1947, Potter enrolled as a master's student at McGill University. On the recommendation of Carl Dawson, founder of McGill's Department of Sociology, Henry F. Hall, SGWC Dean, hired Potter as a sociology lecturer. In 1949, following the defence of his thesis, Potter was promoted from SGWC lecturer to assistant professor.

In 1950, at the same time as Daniel G. Hill, contemporary Black sociologist and future research collaborator, arrived in Canada to start his master's in Sociology at the University of Toronto, Potter went south to pursue his PhD in Sociology at the University of Chicago. With a job waiting, Potter returned to teach at SGWC without completing his degree.

Potter was one of the founding organizers of the Sir George Williams Association of University Teachers in 1951 and would hold the position of president of the association in 1956.

The college promoted Potter to associate professor in 1954 where he taught sociological theory and sociology of the family and continued his research into the occupational patterns of Black Canadians. In 1960, SGWC became Sir George Williams University (SGWU) and Potter was charged with hiring and setting up the new Department of Sociology and Anthropology. Potter—promoted to full professor—served as the first chair of the department in 1963–64 and again in 1966–67.

In 1964, Potter had a son, Evan Harold, with an Austrian émigré, Theresia Hebein. They married in 1970.

In 1969, while on sabbatical at Southeastern Massachusetts University (now UMass Dartmouth), Potter came face to face with the heightened racial tensions on American campuses when he was accused by some Black students of not displaying sufficient militancy.

Meanwhile, in Montréal, the Sir George Williams University campus was not immune from the social upheaval of the 1960s. In 1969, in what came to be known as the "Sir George Williams affair", an accusation of racism against a professor by students of West Indian heritage sparked a major national controversy over questions of racial discrimination in Canada. Potter maintained that he had never experienced discrimination at Sir George Williams.

SGWU merged with Loyola College in 1974 to form Concordia University. Potter retired from Concordia three years later, in 1977. Potter died on May 8, 2004.

== Social views and academic contributions ==
Potter's scholarship was influenced by the Chicago school and its commitment to empirical field work studies of urban communities, contemporary social problems, and occupational groups. Potter's master's thesis, "The Occupational Adjustments of Montréal Negroes", was supervised by Oswald Hall, one of the many Chicago school alumni who dominated McGill's Department of Sociology well into the 1950s. For decades, Potter's thesis became the standard sociological text to cite on the limited job opportunities available to Black citizens in early twentieth-century Montréal. Potter reported that, in the early 1940s, nearly 50% of all Black male wage earners were sleeping car porters and almost 80% of Black women were employed as domestic servants. The remainder worked in menial occupations or the "entertainment industry". Potter concluded that the "physical visibility of Negro men and women limit[ed] their range of economic opportunity."

Potter continued to be a keen observer, but not an activist, of Black public life in Canada and abroad. His contributions as a teacher, public lecturer, and media speaker eclipsed his publication record.

Potter spoke regularly on the topics of race and prejudice. He optimistically opined that prejudice was on the wane, especially in the wake of World War Two, a war that—he believed—had shown the necessity of an egalitarian and meritocratic social order. In 1949, at an Ottawa YMCA event, Potter argued that "racial superiority causes war". He would also, on occasion, suggest that if a capitalist economic system drove prejudice it needed to be changed. He credited the Montréal Jewish community with combating racial and religious prejudice and helping Black residents to succeed.

In his writings, and as a prominent member of Montréal's Negro Citizenship Association in the 1960s, Potter stressed that the achievements of prominent Black Canadians, including successful doctors, corporate executives, and even the international fame of Montréal pianist, Oscar Peterson, proved that Blacks were talented, capable, and productive. Black Canadians, he contended, deserved a place in the Canadian mosaic; they were not an "unassimilable element in the Canadian population". In 1960, Potter predicted that "a colored man might some day become President of the United States just so his country can deal more effectively with the rest of the world." Potter, however, also qualified this believe in Black upward mobility, by taking a dim and divisive view of mid-century Caribbean arrivals to Canada, many of whom he deemed "penniless strangers" who were unclean, dressed "outlandishly", and whose lack of "marketable skills" meant they were prey to the "sharks and barracudas of a great central city".

In 1968, Potter was among the public notables who signed an open letter to the prime minister requesting the establishment of diplomatic relations between Canada and the People's Republic of China.

In his 1971 positive review of the first edition of Robin W. Winks' standard text, The Blacks in Canada: A History, Potter critiqued the author for overlooking the history of successful Black Canadian academics and business people, the "white prejudice of some Negroes" and concluded that "the fate [of Blacks] in Canada...has been better than their fate in the U.S.A."

== Selected bibliography ==
- Potter, Harold H. "The occupational adjustments of Montréal Negroes, 1941–48." Master's thesis, McGill University, 1949.
- Morin, Renée; and Harold H. Potter. Camp Laquemac: a bilingual adult education training centre. Toronto: The Canadian Association for Adult Education, 1953.
- Potter, Harold H. "Negroes in Canada." Race 3:1 (1961):pp. 39–56.
- Potter, Harold H. and Daniel G. Hill. Negro Settlement in Canada, 1628-1965: A Survey. Report presented to the Royal Commission on Bilingualism and Biculturalism. Montréal: Government of Canada, 1966.

Reviews:

- Potter, Harold H. "Not quite so black a tale." Globe and Mail, 21 August 1971, p. A14.
- Potter, Harold H. and Robert Staples. "The Black Family: Essays and Studies." Contemporary Sociology 2:6 (1973): pp. 633–635.
- Potter, Harold H., David R. Hughes, and Evelyn Kallen. "The Anatomy of Racism: Canadian Dimensions." Contemporary Sociology, 5:4 (1976): pp. 493–494.
- Potter, Harold H, William M. Boyd, Charles V. Willie, Arline Sakuma McCord. "Desegregating America's Colleges: A Nationwide survey of Black Students, 1972–73." Contemporary Sociology 5:4 (1976): pp. 461–462.
