= Wayde Compton =

Canadian writer

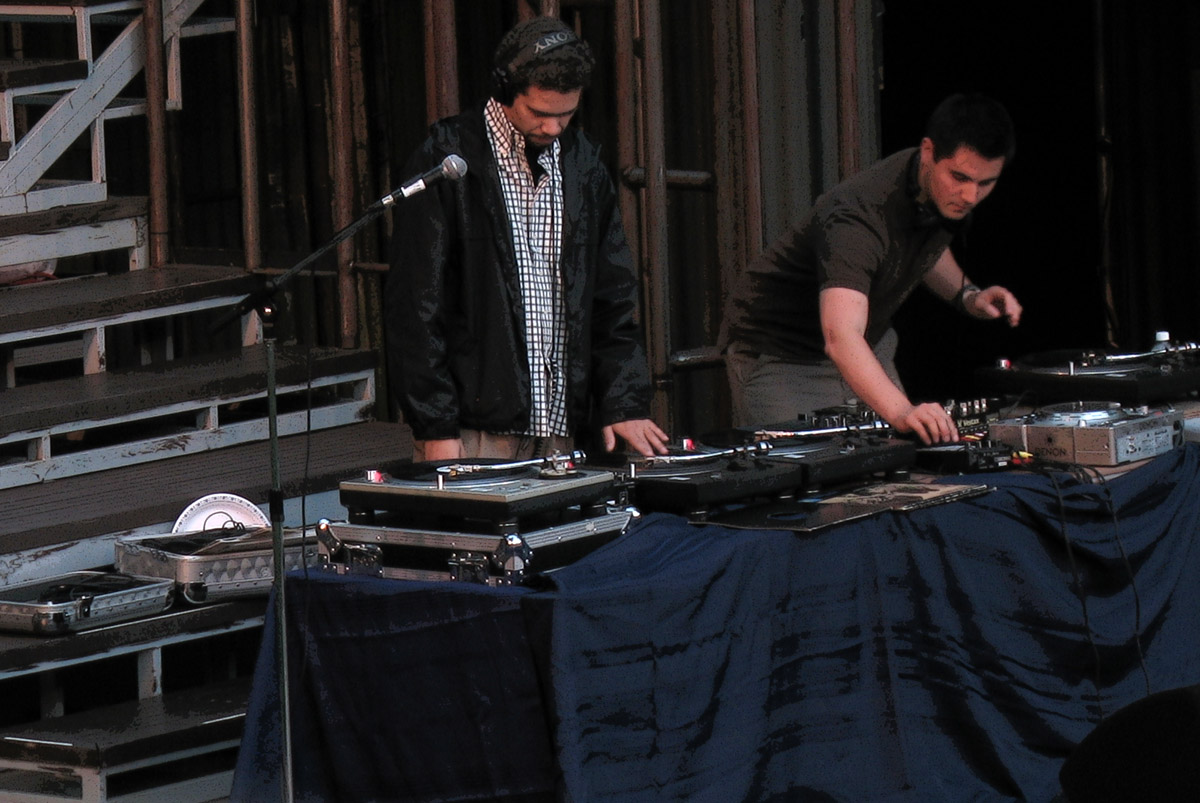
Wayde Compton (left) with Jason de Couto at Scream in High Park, 2008

Wayde Compton (born 1972) is a Canadian writer. He was born in Vancouver, British Columbia.

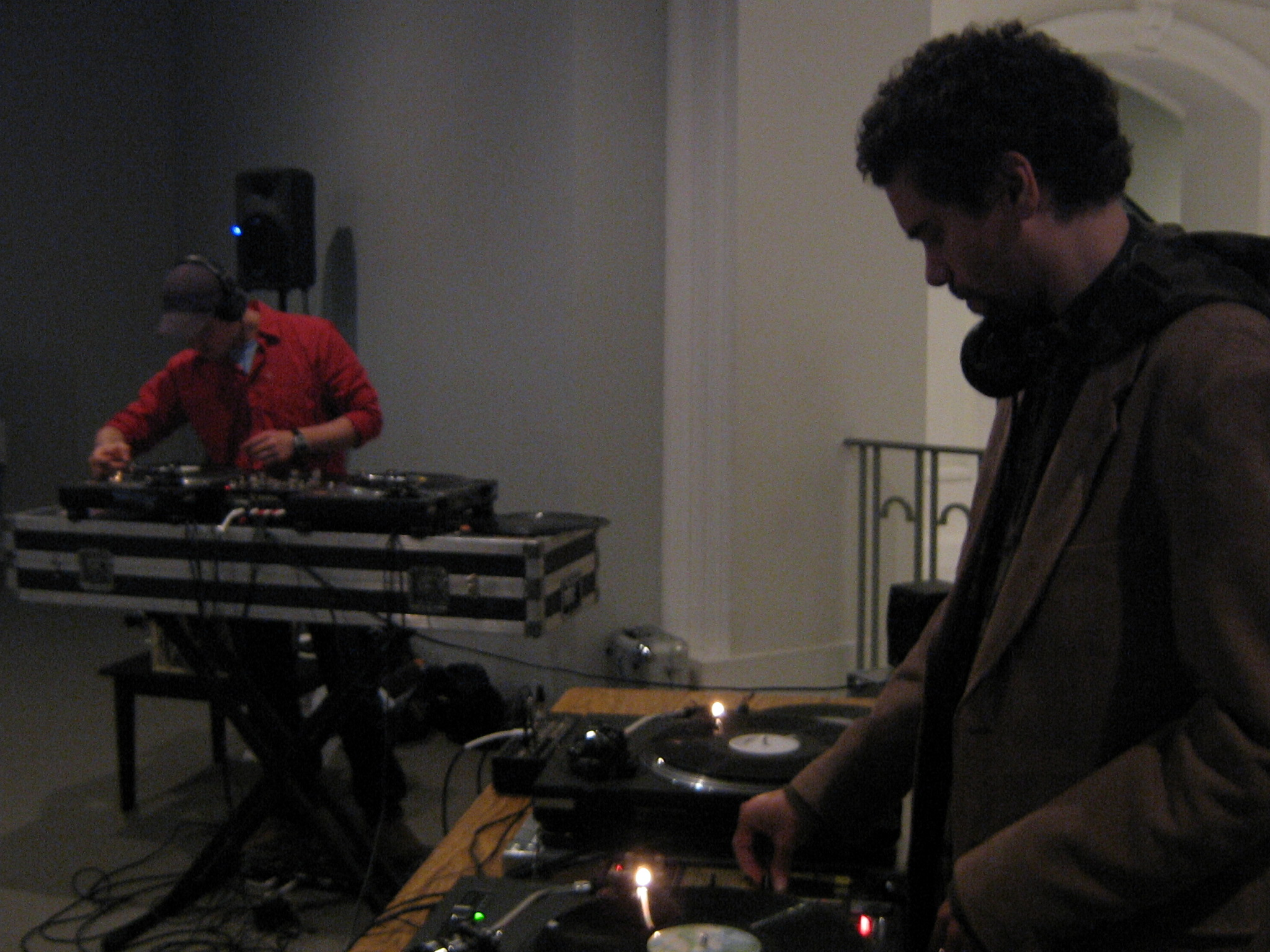
Wayde Compton (right) and Jason de Couto performing turntable poetry at the Vancouver Art Gallery, 2006

Compton has published books of poetry, essays, and fiction, and he edited the first comprehensive anthology of black writing from British Columbia. He co-founded Commodore Books with David Chariandy and Karina Vernon in 2006, the first black-oriented press in Western Canada. He also co-founded the Hogan's Alley Memorial Project in 2002, a grassroots organization that promotes the history of Vancouver's black community. Compton teaches in the faculty of writing at the University of Victoria.

In 1996, he penned the semi-autobiographical poem "Declaration of the Halfrican Nation".

== Bibliography ==
=== Anthologies ===
- Bluesprint: Black British Columbian Literature and Orature (2001)
- The Revolving City: 51 Poems and the Stories Behind Them (with Renée Sarojini Saklikar) (2015)

=== Fiction ===
- The Outer Harbour: Stories (2014)

=== Graphic fiction ===
- The Blue Road: A Fable of Migration (illustrated by April dela Noche Milne) (2019)

=== Non-fiction ===
- After Canaan: Essays on Race, Writing, and Region (2010)
- Toward an Anti-Racist Poetics (2024)

=== Poetry ===
- 49th Parallel Psalm (1999)
- Performance Bond (2004)

== See also ==
- Canadian literature
- Canadian poetry
- List of Canadian poets
- List of Black Canadian writers
- List of writers from British Columbia
