= List of Black Nova Scotians =

This is a list of notable Black Nova Scotians.

== Politicians ==
- Graham L. Downey First Black Municipal Councillor, First Black Deputy Mayor]] City Council
- Wayne Adams, first black person in the Nova Scotia House of Assembly
- Yvonne Atwell, first black woman in the Nova Scotia House of Assembly (succeeded Adams)
- Wanda Thomas Bernard, Canadian Senator
- Mayann Francis, first black woman Lieutenant Governor of Nova Scotia
- Daurene Lewis, first black woman mayor in Canada; recipient of Order of Canada
- Donald Oliver, first black man to have a seat in the Senate; recipient of Order of Canada
- Calvin Ruck, recipient of Order of Canada
- Bill White, first black person to run for federal office in Canada (1949 Canadian federal election)

== Artists ==
- Bucky Adams, jazz musician
- Dawn Shepherd, circus artist
- Gary Beals, R&B musician
- Keonte Beals, R&B musician
- Walter Borden, actor
- George Boyd, playwright/journalist
- George Elliott Clarke, poet and playwright
- Sterling Jarvis, singer and actor
- Carshae Beals, R&B musician and actor
- Cy McLean, pianist and band leader
- Kaleb Simmonds, R&B musician
- Faith Nolan, folk and jazz musician
- Rob "Blye" Paris of Citizen Kane, rapper
- Jamie Sparks, R&B singer, composer, and brother of Jeremiah Sparks
- Nelson Symonds, jazz guitarist
- Maxine Tynes, poet and educator
- Portia White, operatic contralto
- Joe Jojo Bowden, Composer, Bandleader, Drummer
- John "Hubba" Parris, Rock and roll singer, lead vocalist of "Spyder"

== Filmmakers ==
- Cory Bowles, actor, director
- Floyd Kane, filmmaker, director

== Athletes ==
- Marjorie Bailey, sprinter
- George Dixon, boxer
- Dwayne "The Rock" Johnson, American actor, professional wrestler and businessman, son of Rocky Johnson
- Kirk Johnson, boxer
- Rocky Johnson, wrestler, father of Dwayne "The Rock" Johnson and grandfather of Simone Johnson
- Sam Langford, boxer
- Simone Johnson, American professional wrestler, daughter of Dwayne "The Rock" Johnson and granddaughter of Rocky Johnson.
- Lindell Wigginton, basketball player
- Bill Riley, hockey player
- Wayne Smith, football player
- Alton White, hockey player
- Tyrone Williams, football player
- Pokey Reddick, hockey player
- Ricky Anderson, boxer
- Leonard Sinclair Sparks, boxer
- Art Dorrington, hockey player
- Stan "Chook" Maxwell, hockey player
- Clyde Gray, boxer
- David Downey, boxer
- Ray Downey, boxer
- Wayne Simmonds, hockey player
- Tyson Cave, boxer

== Veterans ==
- William Hall, Victoria Cross recipient
- Benjamin Jackson, sailor and Civil War soldier
- Jeremiah Jones, World War I soldier
- Joseph B. Noil, sailor and Medal of Honor recipient
- Isaac Phills, World War I soldier and Order of Canada recipient
- William A. White, chaplain of No. 2 Construction Battalion in the Canadian Army in World War I
- Three Black Nova Scotians served in the American Civil War in the 54th Regiment Massachusetts Volunteer Infantry: Hammel Gilyer, Samuel Hazzard, and Thomas Page.
- Percy Seymour Martin, first African Nova Scotian to win Military Medal

== Activists ==
- Carrie Best, journalist and social activist
- Viola Desmond, businesswoman and civil rights advocate
- Burnley "Rocky" Jones, political activist
- El Jones, activist
- Joan Jones, political activist, businesswoman
- William Pearly Oliver
- Calvin W. Ruck, author of The Black Battalion

== Other notables ==
- Rose Fortune, considered first black woman police officer in Canada
- Donald D. Skeir, pastor, teacher and community leader
- James Robinson Johnston, lawyer and community leader
- James A.R. Kinney, stenographer
- Wellington Ney States, baptist clergyman
- Beverly Mascoll, businesswoman
- Maurice Ruddick (1912–1988), citizen of the year for his role in the 1958 Springhill Mining Disaster
- Corrine Sparks, first African Nova Scotian to be appointed to the judiciary and first African Canadian woman to serve on the bench
- Edith Hester McDonald-Brown, considered first documented Black female painter in Canadian art history
- John Paris Jr., first Black person to coach a pro hockey team
- Edwin Howard Borden, first African Nova Scotian graduate of Acadia University
