= Order of precedence in Nova Scotia =

Relative preeminence of officials for ceremonial purposes

The Nova Scotia order of precedence is a nominal and symbolic hierarchy of important positions within the province of Nova Scotia. It has no legal standing but is used to dictate ceremonial protocol at events of a provincial nature.

Current as of September 2022

1. King in Right of Nova Scotia (His Majesty Charles III)
2. Lieutenant Governor of Nova Scotia (Michael Savage ONS)
3. Premier of Nova Scotia (Tim Houston MLA)
4. Chief Justice of Nova Scotia (Michael Wood)
5. Former Lieutenant Governors
  1. Myra Freeman CM ONS B.A. B.Ed.
  2. Mayann Francis ONS DCL
  3. John James Grant CM CMM ONS CD
  4. Arthur LeBlanc ONS KC
6. Former Premiers
  1. Russell MacLellan KC
  2. John Hamm OC
  3. Rodney MacDonald
  4. Darrell Dexter KC
  5. Stephen McNeil MLA
  6. Iain Rankin MLA
7. Speaker of the Nova Scotia House of Assembly (Keith Bain MLA)
8. Members of the Executive Council of Nova Scotia
  1. Allan MacMaster MLA
  2. Pat Dunn MLA
  3. John Lohr MLA
  4. Karla MacFarlane MLA
  5. Barbara Adams MLA
  6. Tim Halman MLA
  7. Kim Masland MLA
  8. Brad Johns MLA
  9. Tory Rushton MLA
  10. Steve Craig MLA
  11. Colton LeBlanc MLA
  12. Brian Comer MLA
  13. Michelle Thompson MLA
  14. Jill Balser MLA
  15. Greg Morrow MLA
  16. Susan Corkum-Greek MLA
  17. Becky Druhan MLA
  18. Brian Wong MLA
9. Leader of the Opposition (Claudia Chender MLA)
10. Members of the King's Privy Council for Canada resident in Nova Scotia
  1. Elmer MacKay PC KC
  2. Peter McCreath PC
  3. David Dingwall PC KC
  4. Bernie Boudreau PC KC
  5. Robert Thibault PC
  6. Geoff Regan PC
  7. Mark Eyking PC
  8. Scott Brison PC
  9. Peter MacKay PC KC
  10. Bernadette Jordan PC
11. Members of the Federal Cabinet who represent Nova Scotia
12. Chief Justice of the Supreme Court of Nova Scotia (Deborah K. Smith)
13. Associate Chief Justice of the Supreme Court of Nova Scotia (Patrick J. Duncan)
14. Associate Chief Justice of the Supreme Court of Nova Scotia (Family Division) (Lawrence O'Neil)
15. Justices of the Nova Scotia Court of Appeal
16. Justices of the Supreme Court of Nova Scotia
17. Chief Judge of the Provincial Court (Pamela S. Williams)
18. Associate Chief Judge of the Provincial Court (Vacant)
19. Judges of the Provincial Court
20. Associate Chief Judge of the Family Court (S. Raymond Morse)
21. Judges of the Family Court
22. Leader of the Third Party (Claudia Chender MLA)
23. Members of the Nova Scotia House of Assembly (with precedence governed by the date of their first election to the Legislature)
24. Members of the Senate who represent Nova Scotia (with precedence governed by date of appointment)
  1. Jane Marie Cordy
  2. Stephen Greene
  3. Michael L. MacDonald
  4. Wanda Thomas Bernard CM ONS
  5. Daniel Christmas
  6. Mary Coyle
  7. Colin Deacon
  8. Stan Kutcher
25. Members of the House of Commons who represent Nova Scotia (with precedence governed by the date of their first election to the House of Commons)
  1. Andy Fillmore MP
  2. Darren Fisher MP
  3. Sean Fraser MP
  4. Darrell Samson MP
  5. Mike Kelloway MP
  6. Jaime Battiste MP
  7. Kody Blois MP
  8. Chris d'Entremont MP
  9. Lena Diab MP
  10. Stephen Ellis MP
  11. Rick Perkins MP
26. Anglican Bishop of Nova Scotia and Prince Edward Island (Sandra Fyfe)
27. Roman Catholic Archbishop of Halifax (Brian Joseph Dunn)
28. Leaders of Faith Communities
29. Consul General of France in Moncton and Halifax (Johan Schitterer)
30. Consul General of the United States of America in Halifax (Lyra S. Carr)
31. Mayor of the Halifax Regional Municipality (Mike Savage)
32. Commander, Maritime Forces Atlantic and Joint Task Force Atlantic, Canadian Forces (Rear-Admiral Brian Santarpia CD)
33. Commander, 5th Canadian Division, Canadian Forces (Brigadier-General Paul Peyton, MSM CD)
34. Commanding Officer "H" Division, Royal Canadian Mounted Police (Assistant Commissioner Lee Bergerman)
