= John James Grant =

Canadian general and Lieutenant Governor of Nova Scotia

Brigadier General The Honourable John James Grant CM CMM ONS CD
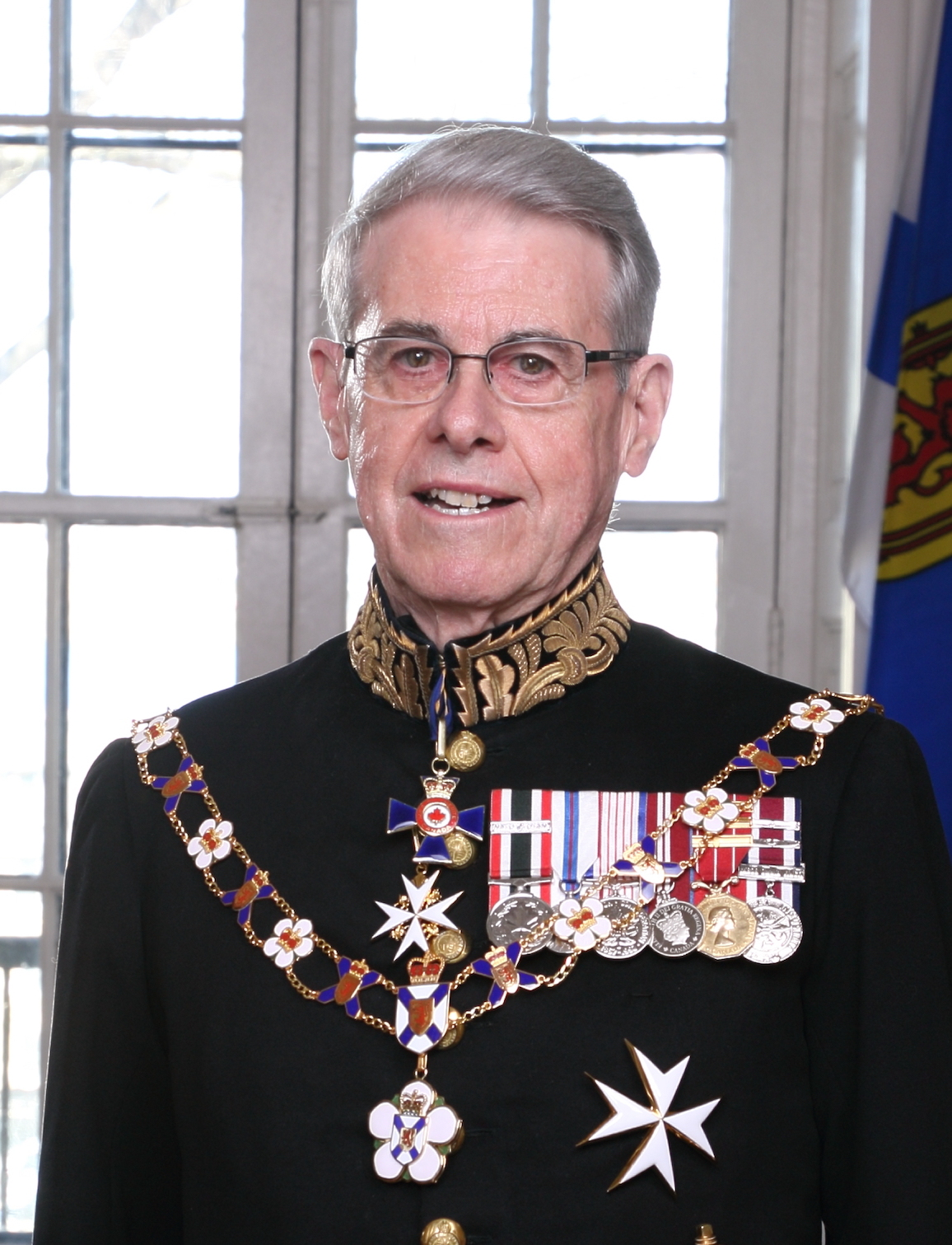
- Grant wearing the Levee Dress Civil Uniform, 2014

32nd Lieutenant Governor of Nova Scotia
- In office April 9, 2012 – June 28, 2017
- Monarch: Elizabeth II
- Governor General: David Johnston
- Premier: Darrell Dexter; Stephen McNeil
- Preceded by: Mayann Francis
- Succeeded by: Arthur LeBlanc

Personal details
- Born: January 17, 1936 (age 90) New Glasgow, Nova Scotia, Canada
- Spouse: Joan Fraser (1936-2022)
- Children: 4 (2 deceased)
- Education: Mount Allison University (BComm)
- Profession: Soldier
- Awards: Order of Military Merit, Canadian Forces' Decoration
- Nickname: "J.J." or "Jim"

Military service
- Allegiance: Canada
- Branch/service: Canadian Army
- Years of service: 1951–1989
- Rank: Brigadier General

John James "Jim" Grant CM CMM ONS CD (born January 17, 1936) is a Canadian politician and soldier who served as the 32nd Lieutenant Governor of Nova Scotia.

== Early life and education ==
Born in New Glasgow, Nova Scotia, Grant attended Mount Allison University, graduating in 1956 with a Bachelor of Commerce degree in Accounting and Economics. He is a registered industrial accountant.

== Career ==
He joined The Pictou Highlanders in 1951 and has served in various leadership positions in the Canadian Forces including as Deputy Commander and Area Commander of the Atlantic Militia Area in 1980, Senior Reserve Advisor to the Commander Force Mobile Command, and as Special Projects Officer on the Chief of Reserves Council at National Defence Headquarters.

He was invested as an Officer in the Order of Military Merit in 1979 and a Commander in the Order in 1988 and has been awarded the Canadian Forces' Decoration with three clasps. Grant retired from military service in 1989.

He has been a Governor of the Nova Scotia Division of the Canadian Corps of Commissionaires since 1986, serving as Vice Chair and Chairman of numerous committees. He has also served on the National Board, on committees of the National Board and as a member of the National Executive. He completed 25 years of service with the Board in January 2011.

Grant was appointed the Lieutenant Governor of Nova Scotia on February 16, 2012 by Governor General of Canada David Johnston on the advice of then-Prime Minister, Stephen Harper. He was succeeded by Arthur LeBlanc on June 28, 2017.

On December 27, 2019, it was announced that Grant had been appointed as a member of the Order of Canada.

== Honours and medals ==
Grant's personal decorations include the following:

Ribbon	Description	Notes
	Order of Canada (CM)	Member; 2019
	Order of Military Merit (CMM)	Appointed Commander (CMM) on 21 September 1988; Appointed Officer (OMM) on 21 May 1980
	Order of St. John (K.StJ)	Appointed Knight of Justice in May 2012
	Order of Nova Scotia (ONS)	2012
	Special Service Medal	with NATO-OTAN Clasp
	Queen Elizabeth II Silver Jubilee Medal	Decoration awarded in 1977; Canadian version
	125th Anniversary of the Confederation of Canada Medal	Decoration awarded in 1992
	Queen Elizabeth II Diamond Jubilee Medal	Decoration awarded in 2012; Canadian version
	Canadian Forces' Decoration (CD)	with three Clasp for 42 years of services
	Commissionaires Long Service Medal	with two Clasp for 22 years of services
	Queen Elizabeth II Platinum Jubilee Medal	Decoration awarded in 2022; Nova Scotia version

Coat of arms of John James Grant
Crest Issuant from a circlet of fraises Argent a lion rampant Gules holding in its dexter paw a staff proper flying therefrom a banner Azure charged with a stag’s head caboshed Argent and in its sinister paw an abacus Or. Escutcheon Per saltire Azure and Argent a saltire nowy Gules charged with three antique crowns Or. Supporters Dexter an officer of the Nova Scotia Highlanders tempore 1954, sinister a non-commissioned officer of the Pictou Highlanders tempore 1910 both standing on a mount of heather Proper. Motto Seasaibh Gu Daingeann Airson A’ Chrùin (Stand Fast For The Crown)

Order of precedence
Preceded by Mayann Francis, former Lieutenant Governor of Nova Scotia	Order of precedence in Nova Scotia as of 2021	Succeeded by Russell MacLellan, former Premier of Nova Scotia
