= Arthur LeBlanc =

Lieutenant Governor of Nova Scotia from 2017 to 2024

The Honourable Arthur LeBlanc ONS KC
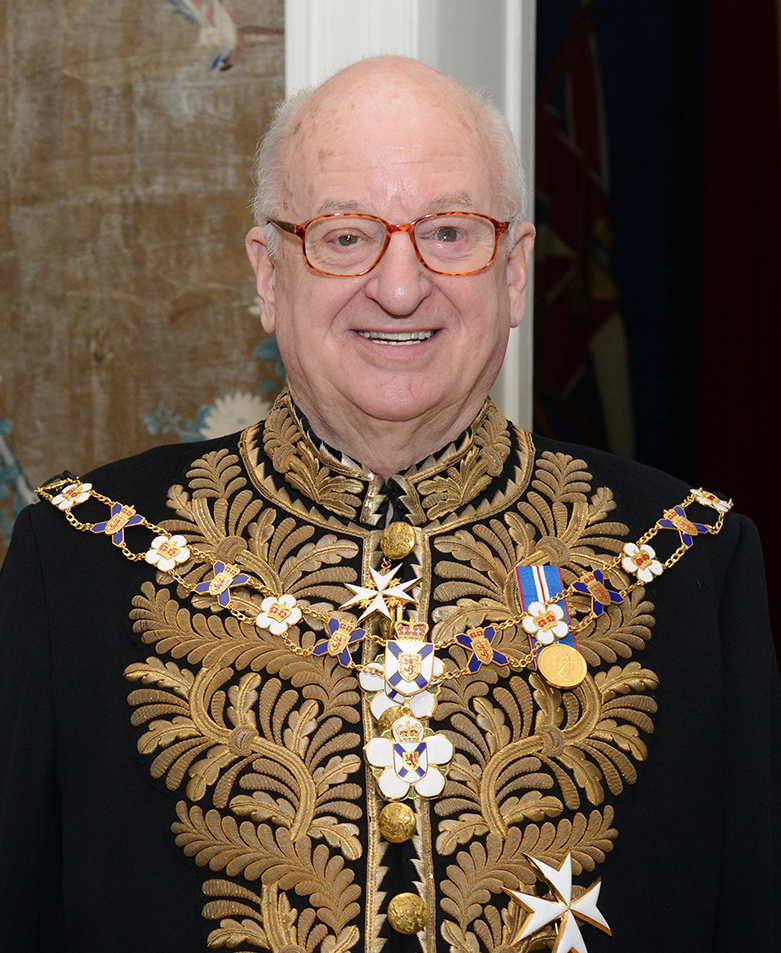
- LeBlanc in 2020

33rd Lieutenant Governor of Nova Scotia
- In office June 28, 2017 – December 13, 2024
- Monarchs: Elizabeth II; Charles III
- Governors General: David Johnston; Julie Payette; Mary Simon
- Premier: Stephen McNeil; Iain Rankin; Tim Houston
- Preceded by: John James Grant
- Succeeded by: Mike Savage

Justice of the Supreme Court of Nova Scotia
- In office 1998 – June 28, 2017
- Nominated by: Jean Chrétien

Personal details
- Born: Arthur Joseph LeBlanc; 1943 (age 82–83) West Arichat, Nova Scotia, Canada
- Education: St. Francis Xavier University; Dalhousie University
- Profession: Lawyer; judge

Arthur Joseph LeBlanc ONS KC (born 1943) is a Canadian lawyer and judge who was the 33rd lieutenant governor of Nova Scotia from 2017 to 2024. He was appointed as the Chancellor of Université Sainte-Anne in September 2025.

== Early life and education ==
Arthur LeBlanc was born in 1943 in West Arichat, Nova Scotia. He attended St. Francis Xavier University, graduating in 1964 with a Bachelor of Commerce, subsequently earning a Bachelor of Laws from Dalhousie University in 1968. He was admitted to the bar in November 1968.

== Career ==
=== Legal career ===
LeBlanc practiced law for over 30 years, concentrating his practice in civil litigation. In 1983, LeBlanc was appointed as Queen's Counsel. In 1998, he was appointed as a Justice of the Supreme Court of Nova Scotia on the advice of Prime Minister Jean Chrétien. During this time, he concluded almost 15 years of litigation between the Nova Scotia Home for Colored Children and the provincial government, signing off on a CA$29 million settlement for the former residents of the home.

=== Lieutenant governor ===
LeBlanc was appointed Lieutenant Governor of Nova Scotia on June 14, 2017, by Governor General David Johnston on the constitutional advice of Prime Minister Justin Trudeau. He was sworn in on June 28, 2017. He was Nova Scotia's first Lieutenant Governor of Acadian descent.

=== Université Sainte-Anne ===
In September 2025, LeBlanc was named the Chancellor of Université Sainte-Anne, succeeding Noël Després.

== Personal life ==
LeBlanc is married to his wife, Rosemarie Patricia LeBlanc. Together they have three sons: Pierre, André, and Robert.

== Awards and honours ==
Ribbon Bar of Arthur LeBlanc

Ribbon	Description	Post-nominal letters	Notes
	Knight/Dame of the Order of St. John	KStJ	
	Order of Nova Scotia	ONS	
	Queen Elizabeth II Golden Jubilee Medal		Canadian version
	Queen Elizabeth II Platinum Jubilee Medal		Nova Scotia version
	King Charles III Coronation Medal		Canadian version

== Coat of arms ==
Coat of arms of Arthur Joseph LeBlanc

Notes
The announcement of the Letters Patent was made on November 17, 2018, in Volume 152, page 3860 of the Canada Gazette.
Granted
2018
Crest
A balance its pivot a ship’s wheel Or, issuant from a coronet of maple leaves Gules and treble clefs, its rim Azure.
Escutcheon
Tierced in pairle reversed Azure, Gules and Argent, in chief two closed books Or edged Argent, in base a ship Azure of three sails Azure charged with a mullet Or, Argent and Gules.
Supporters
Two blue jays standing on a mount of mayflowers proper
Motto
DONNER LE MEILLEUR DE SOI
Symbolism
The colours are taken from the Acadian flag, His Honour being the first Lieutenant-Governor of Nova Scotia of Acadian descent and the first francophone since 1713. The ship’s sails are in the form of the Acadian flag. The ship honours His Honour’s mariner ancestors, and is also a symbol of Acadia and of New Brunswick, the birthplace of Her Honour Mrs. Patsy LeBlanc. The books symbolize Their Honours' commitment to education and the arts.

The balance is a symbol of justice and refers to His Honour's career as a lawyer and a judge. The ship’s wheel connects the design to the ship in the arms. The maple leaves allude to his service to Canada, and the treble clefs indicate Their Honours’ support for the arts.

The blue jay is a local bird species. The mayflowers are the provincial flower of Nova Scotia.
