= Donald D. Skeir =

African Nova Scotian community leader

Donald Douglas Skeir
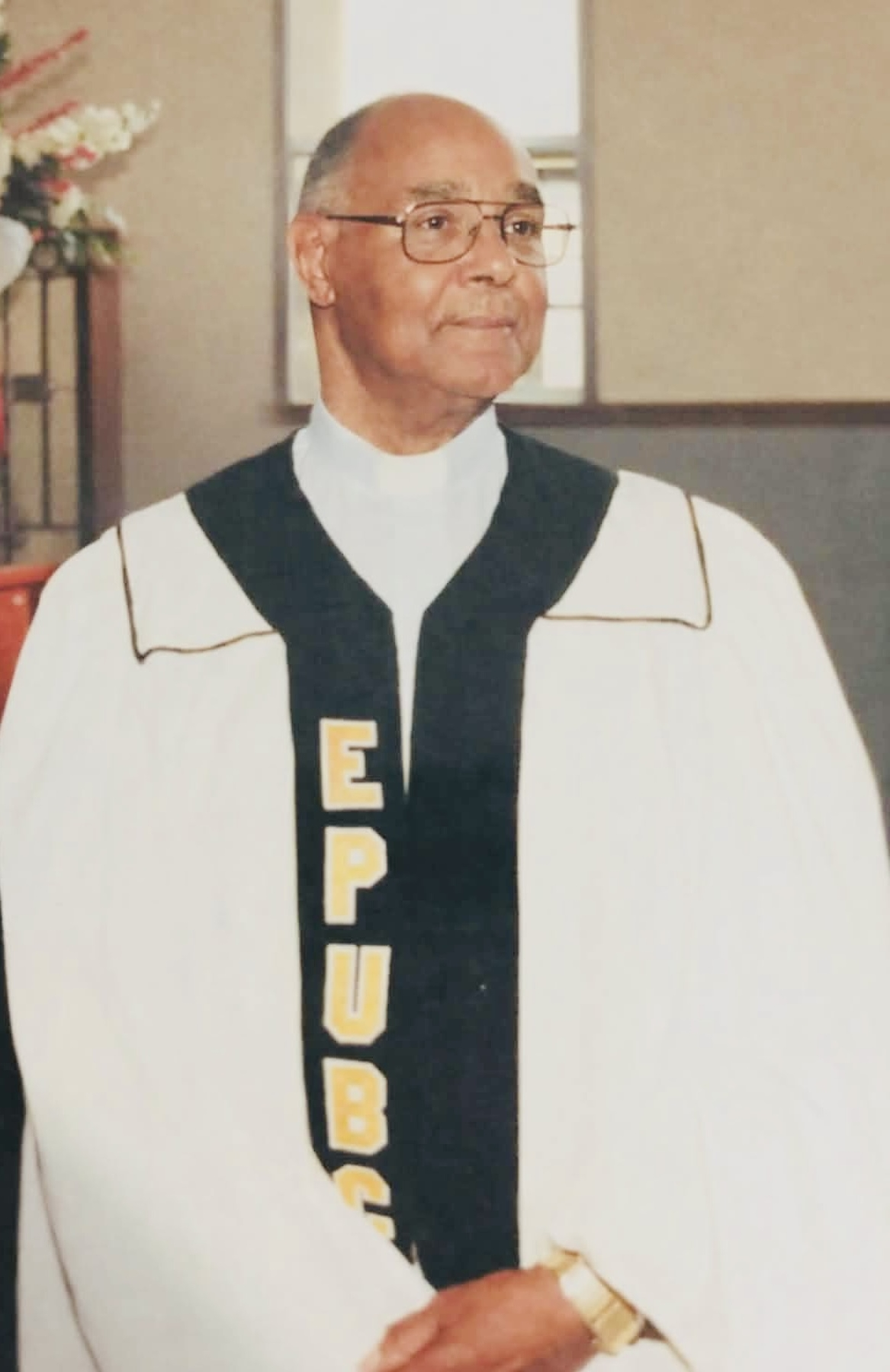
- Born: 1926; Halifax, Nova Scotia
- Died: 1999 (aged 72–73)
- Education: Acadia University, Dalhousie University
- Occupations: Pastor, community leader, teacher

Donald D. Skeir (1926 - 1999) was a Canadian pastor, community leader, and educator in the African Nova Scotian community.

== Biography ==
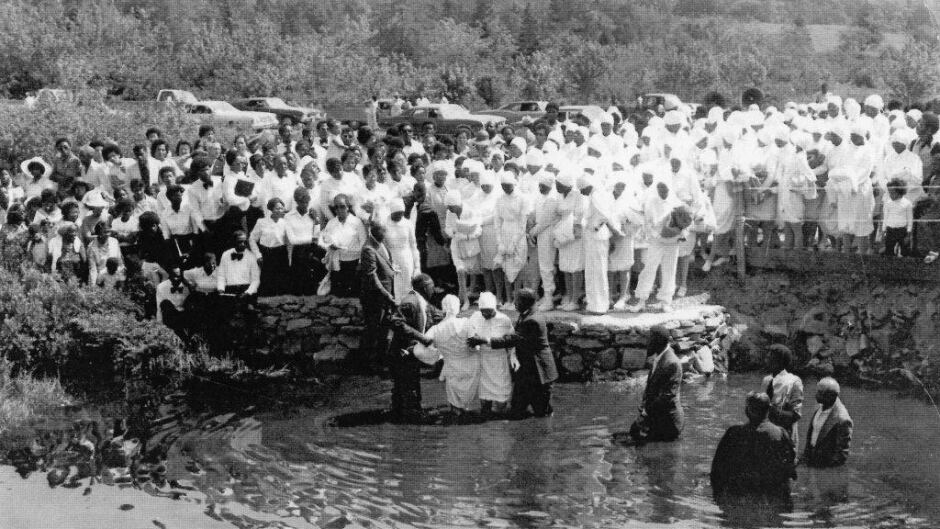
Reverend Dr. Donald D. Skeir leads a baptism on the Partridge River in East Preston, Nova Scotia.

Donald Douglas Skeir was born to Joseph James Skeir and Eva Geraldine Johnson in Halifax, Nova Scotia. He obtained a Bachelor of Arts in Theology from Acadia University and later studied Special Education at Dalhousie University. His wife Evelina (née Allison Fletcher) Skeir, was also an active church leader, human rights and women's rights advocate.

Skeir served as a pastor in the historic community of Africville, as well as in North Preston, East Preston, and Cherrybrook for over 40 years. Along with being a spiritual leader, he was a lifelong advocate for community organization and the development of businesses for the purpose of economic empowerment in the African Nova Scotian community.

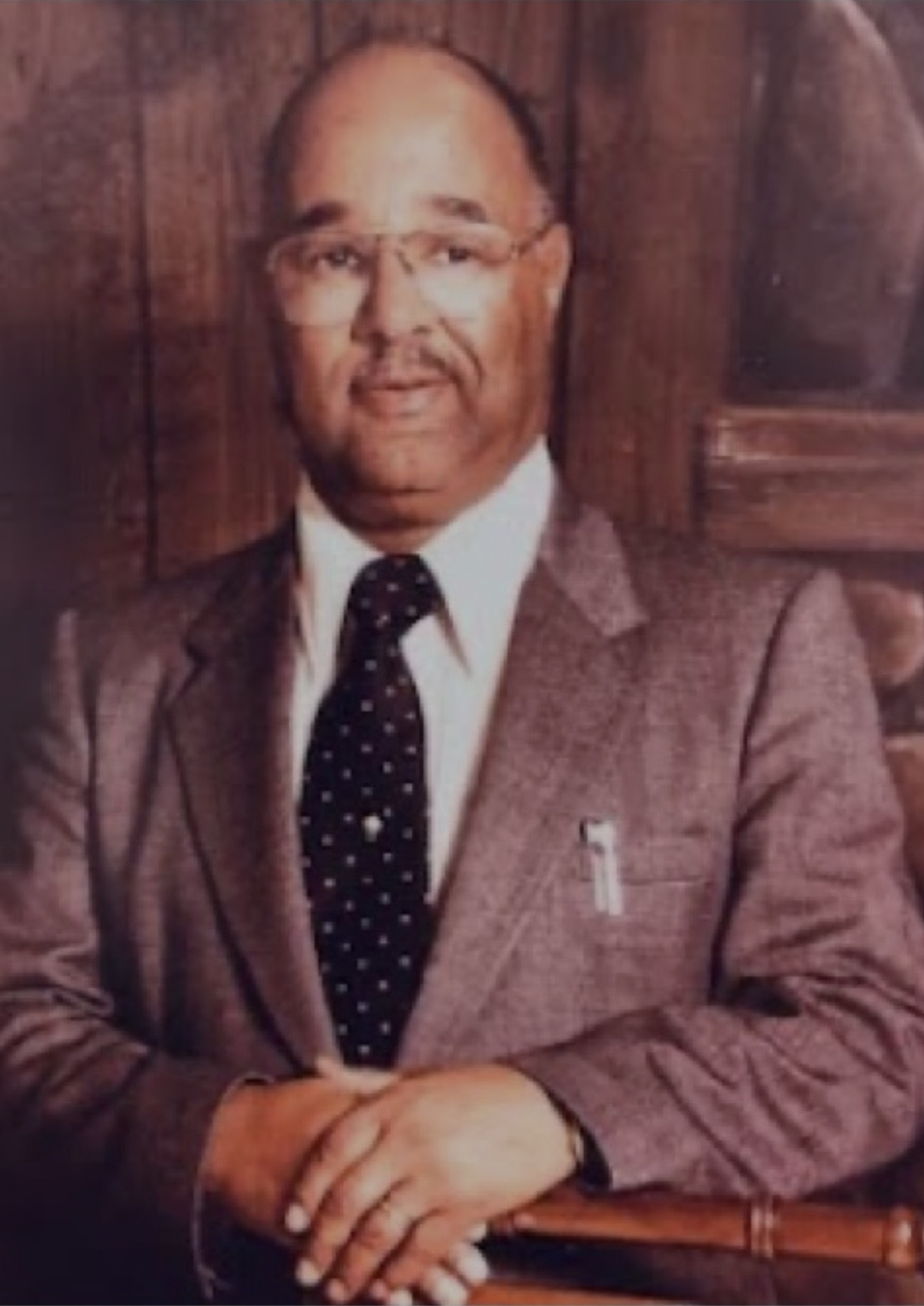
Reverend Dr. Donald D. Skeir during his tenure as an educator with the Halifax County School Board.

He worked as an educator for over 25 years, teaching at area schools including Nelson Whynder Elementary, Sir Robert Borden Junior High and Bell Park Academic Centre.

On July 11, 1976 Skeir led one of the largest mass baptisms in Nova Scotia's history. 110 members of the East Preston United Baptist Church were baptized at a service conducted on the Partridge River, with an estimated 300 people in attendance. He pastored at the church in East Preston for 42 years.

He was a founding member of the Black Cultural Centre for Nova Scotia, and held various leadership positions with the African United Baptist Association, Black United Front, Halifax Regional Centre for Education, Black Incentive Fund for Black Students, Canadian Baptists of Atlantic Canada, Canadian Red Cross Society, NS Association for the Advancement of Coloured Children, East Preston Daycare Centre, Nova Scotia Home for Colored Children, Black Learners Advisory Committee, Advanced Management Committee for Blacks, Black Educators Association (BEA), County School Committee on Racism, and the Nova Scotia Human Rights Commission. He would travel to the United States to represent the interests of Nova Scotians at Baptist World Alliance and Southern Christian Leadership Conference conventions.

== Honours ==
In 1995, Skeir received an honorary Doctorate in Divinity from Acadia University.

In 1999, he was presented an award by the Nova Scotia Human Rights Commission for his lifelong dedication to empowering youth. Upon his passing the same year, he was recognized in the Nova Scotia Legislature by David Hendsbee as "Nova Scotia's own Martin Luther King, Jr."

In 2023, a street in a new housing development in the Preston area was named "Dr. Donald Skeir Way" in his honour.
