= Nova Scotia Human Rights Commission =

Nova Scotian government agency

Agency overview
- Jurisdiction: Government of Nova Scotia
- Headquarters: Halifax Regional Municipality, Nova Scotia
- Employees: 24.5 FTE (2015–2016)
- Annual budget: CAD$2.5 million (2015–2016)
- Minister responsible: Randy Delorey, Department of Justice
- Agency executives: Cheryl Knockwood, Chair; Deepak Prasad, Vice-Chair
- Parent department: Independent agency of the Department of Justice
- Website: humanrights.novascotia.ca

The Nova Scotia Human Rights Commission was established in Nova Scotia, Canada in 1967 to administer the Nova Scotia Human Rights Act. The Nova Scotia Human Rights Commission is the first commission in Canada to engage a restorative dispute resolution process.

The Commission is an arm's-length independent agency of the Government of Nova Scotia accountable to the Nova Scotia Department of Justice for budgetary issues. The Commission's mandate under the Act includes: helping people prevent discrimination through public education and public policy, and effecting resolution in situations where a complaint of discriminatory behaviour has been initiated.

The Commission offers assistance to those trying to prevent discrimination on the basis of ethnic, national and aboriginal origin, age, color, creed, disability (physical and mental and perception of it), ethnic origin, family status (parent-child relationship), fear of contracting an illness, gender expression, harassment based on other protected characteristics, national origin, marital status, sex (including pregnancy), sexual identity, sexual harassment, political belief, race, religion, source of income. It is also a violation to retaliate against someone who files a complaint or expresses an intention to complain or to retaliate against someone who assists in making a complaint.

== History ==
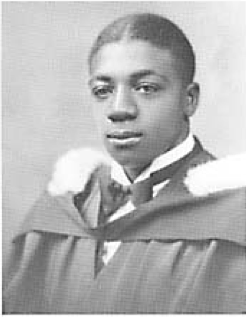
William Pearly Oliver, 1934

This commission is in Nova Scotia. In the early sixties direct involvement of premier Robert Stanfield along with William Pearly Oliver were instrumental in laying the foundation in Nova Scotia for the establishment of the Commission. Originally the mandate of the Commission was primarily to address the plight of Black Nova Scotians.

In 1940, Dr. William Oliver volunteered for the Department of Education to improve the condition of ethnic minorities in Nova Scotia. After five years, he was hired on with the Department. The following year, 1946, the Viola Desmond case galvanized the civil rights movement in Nova Scotia. According to founding Commissioner Fred MacKinnon, Oliver spent these years, “organizing and promoting self-help in the black communities of the Province but, even more importantly, he did much to advance public support and understanding in and out of government in respect to the social and economic plight of Black Nova Scotians.”

In 1955 the Fair Employment Practices Act was passed followed by the Equal Pay Act of 1956, both acts were designed to prevent discrimination in the workplace. Premier Robert Stanfield came to power in 1956 and made Human Rights, particularly for Black Nova Scotians, one of his main priorities over his next eleven years as premier. In 1959, the assembly passed the Fair Accommodation Practices Act to guard against discrimination in public spaces. Stanfield reports that, "Clearly more than a declaration of equality was required. More than the passage of Laws against discrimination would be necessary before Blacks achieved real equality and clearly years of concerted effort would be necessary." In 1962, Premier Stanfield created and led the Interdepartmental Committee on Human Rights. The mandate of the committee was to encourage the work of Dr. William Oliver in the black communities and the new Social Development Program. According to Fred MacKinnon, without Premier Stanfield's “prodding, goading and encouraging” government into action, “Human Rights legislation might not have been introduced for at least another decade.” The Premier codified and extended earlier legislation in the first Human Rights Act of 1963. The government established the Education fund for Negros in 1965. While Premier Stanfield went into federal politics in 1967, he and Dr. Williams had laid the foundation for the Human Rights Commission to be established in that same year. Others who supported the early development of the Human Rights Commission were Donald Oliver, Gus Wedderburn, Carrie Best and Buddy Daye. The first employee of the Commission was Gordon Earle.

The Commission quickly introduced wide-ranging legislation amendments to the Human Rights Act, “making the Nova Scotia legislation the strongest and most comprehensive of its kind in Canada.” The Commission provided funds for William Oliver's newest organization, the Black United Front and sponsored a two-day workshop with activist Saul Alinsky.

In 1967, the Commission's explicit purpose was to challenge discrimination on racial, religious and ethnic grounds. In 1991, the Nova Scotia Human Rights Act and the Commission significantly broadened its mandate to include the following protected characteristics: Aboriginal Origin, Age, Family Status (the status of being in a parent and child relationship), Irrational Fear of Contracting an Illness (for example, to adequately protect people living with HIV/AIDS), Marital Status, Political Affiliation, Sex, Pregnancy, Sexual Harassment, Sex (Sexual Orientation).

== Organizational structure ==
There are 24.5 permanent staff in three regions of the province: the central office in Halifax and two regional offices located in Sydney and Digby. Three units carry out the operational and administrative functions: 1) the CEO's office or unit which includes in-house legal counsel. 2) The Dispute Resolution unit takes complaints, collects information and assists the parties to resolve them. The human rights officers also make recommendations to the Commissioners for further dispute resolution in the form of a board or inquiries or dismissal of a complaint. 3)The Race Relations, Equity and Inclusion unit provides public education and community outreach on matters related to human rights and provides human rights training that arises from the resolution processes.

== Commissioners ==
The director and CEO is a non-voting commissioner. There are a maximum of twelve Commissioners (Board of Directors). The Commissioners screen complaints to determine whether or not a board of inquiry should be appointed. This final process of dispute resolution can assist the parties with an independent adjudicator hearing the full complaint or aspects of it. The Commissioners also make policy decisions. Some prominent Commissioners in the past have included Wanda Thomas Bernard, Daniel N. Paul, Sister Dorothy MooreCalvin Ruck and Edward Russell. .

== CEO unit ==
The CEO Unit includes a director and chief executive officer at the commission, currently Joseph Fraser. Former CEOs of the Commission have included: Christine Hanson (2016-2021); Marvin Schiff (1968–1971); Dr. George McCurdy (1971–1983); Cathy MacNutt (1984-1985); Dr. Anthony Johnstone (1985–1989); Dr. Bridglal Pachai (1989–1994); Wayne MacKay (1995–1998); Mayann Francis (former Lieutenant Governor of Nova Scotia) (1999–2006); Michael Noonan (Acting)(2006–2008); Krista Daley (2008–2011); Karen Fitzner (Acting) (2011); David Shannon (2011–2013); Tracey Williams (2014-2015)

=== Legal Unit ===
In April 2012, the Commission enhanced its options for boards of inquiry processes, philosophically moving away from the adversarial civil litigation model which was observed to compound the harms of the dispute. The Commission innovated to create a restorative approach to conflict resolution and adjudication. On December 10, 2012 (International Human Rights Day), the world's first restorative human rights adjudication was heard in Wolfville, Nova Scotia. There are five reported decisions using these restorative inquisitorial procedures at a board of inquiry.

Boards of inquiries that take a restorative approach use an inquisitorial model to adjudicate: the adjudicator, rather than lawyers, ask the questions. There is no cross or direct examination. Lawyers or the parties refer their questions to the adjudicator who asks them. The parties come together in a circle to share the information/evidence needed to make a decision on whether there is discrimination. Witnesses use a secular talking piece; the party with the talking piece is the only one permitted to speak by the adjudicator.

The legal unit, within the CEO unit, has in-house counsel and a restorative facilitator.

=== Nova Scotia Human Rights Award ===
To mark International Human Rights Day each year, the Commission awards a Human Rights Award on December 10 to an individual and an organization to recognize the work of Nova Scotians in promoting and protecting human rights. Some of the recipients were: the late Pat Skinner (2006), Percy Paris (2005), Senator Donald Oliver (2006), Dr. Hetty van Gurp (2006), Just Us! Coffee Roasters Co-op's Jeff and Deborah Moore (2005), M. Lee Cohen (2002), Henderson Paris (1999), and Amnesty International(1994).

== Dispute Resolution unit ==
Nova Scotia Human Rights Commission is the first commission in Canada to engage a restorative dispute resolution process. With this change, the Commission moves away from the traditional investigation with optional mediation. The traditional process was often long and seldom involved bringing parties together except for an adversarial public inquiry.

The current dispute resolution program uses a more collaborative, restorative approach between the parties involved, which facilitates a more responsive and timely resolution. In less than a year and a half, the Commission eliminated a three-year backlog using this process. The complaint information is now collected in person by the human rights officer. Also, if appropriate, the parties are brought together to share the impacts and to build a forward looking plan. In-person restorative processes can provide better emotional closure for both of the parties since each has an opportunity to discuss how events impacted them and how to create changes for the future. The process also enhances learning about human rights since it involves a sharing of stories rather than a blaming and defending of harms.

This shift from an adversarial to a collaborative model represents an understanding of the need to minimize traditional legalistic processes, inherited from the civil litigation system. Human rights law is public law and is concerned not just with individual harms (like the civil tort system) but also the broader social context which contributes to the harm. The public interest in a human rights context also concerns itself with the way discriminatory harm impacts the greater social community. Canadian Human rights historically and currently is concerned with remediating private and public harm as opposed to punishing the respondent.

== Race Relations, Equity and Inclusion unit ==
=== Abilities ===
The Commission works to inform employers about their responsibilities to accommodate People with Disabilities (PwD). They also work to raise the profile of PwD in Nova Scotia.

==== Symposium on Inclusive Employment and Education Conference ====
This symposium is focused on assisting awareness on disabilities in education and employment sectors.

==== Halifax Metro Transit Accessibility Improvements ====
Disabled transit riders in Halifax Regional Municipality, Nova Scotia, have seen improved accessibility. Halifax Metro Transit engaged in a wide-ranging dialogue, facilitated by the Commission, with two passengers who use wheelchairs. These conversations created many striking improvements in services. The resolutions, available on the Commission's website, resolve the accessibility concerns shared by larger disabled communities around Halifax's public transportation. For those with mobility challenges, public transportation is an essential service to participate in work, school, and cultural life.

These significant changes were implemented in the fall of 2011. All low floor buses, for example, will accept wheelchair passengers unless the physical stop cannot accommodate the bus ramp and/or other safety concerns. These changes address complaints that passenger access to buses was unduly restricted due to policy rather than actual operational needs or limitations. Previously, policy dictated that low floor buses could pick up passengers only when the entire route was designated accessible (i.e., every stop on the route was determined to be an accessible stop). A full inventory and upgrade has now been completed. Details on the changes are found on the Halifax Metro Transit website.

==== International Day of Persons with Disabilities ====
The Commission co-hosts an annual symposium in celebration of the International Day of Persons with Disabilities.

=== LGBTI ===
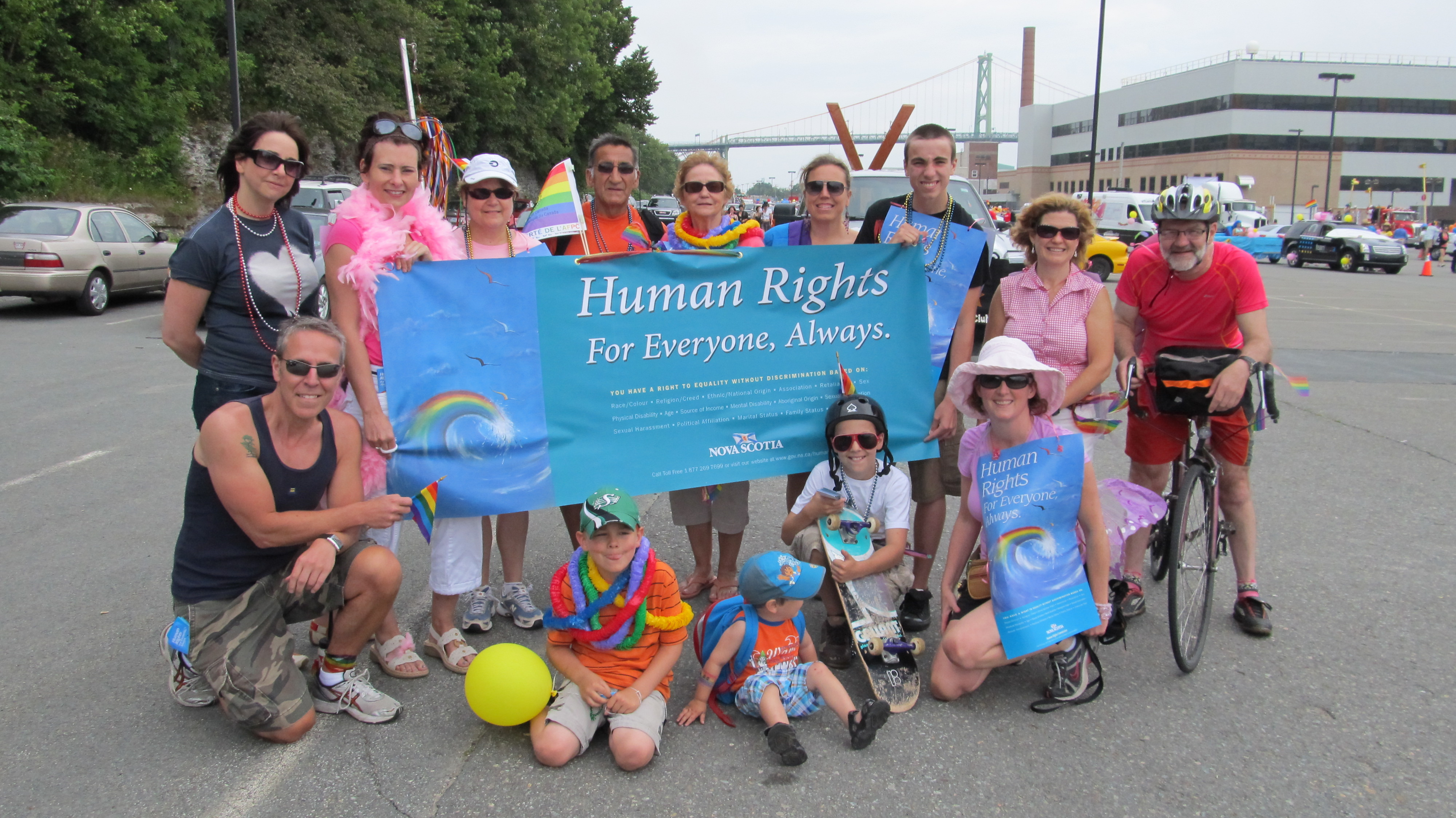
Nova Scotia Human Rights Commission Staff - Pride Parade, Halifax, Nova Scotia, 2011

The Nova Scotia Human Rights Act provides protection for the lesbian and gay communities and transgender people (LGBTI community). The Commission supports the Pride Parade and participates in it annually.

=== Employment Equity Partnerships ===
The Commission has been involved with affirmative action initiatives, now referred to as "employment equity," since 1972. The change in term also represents a philosophical shift from a contractual model to a collaborative model, with the Commission working in partnership with organizations to improve diversity at their workplaces. Between 1971 and 1991, the Commission developed a six-month training program which targeted disadvantaged people to assist them in entering the work force. Some of the more prominent people to participate in this program were Linda Carvery, Kyle Johnson and Jean Knockwood.

The Commission has also addressed affirmative action with institutions of higher education, working with Dalhousie University, Acadia University, and St. Francis Xavier University to develop recruitment initiatives for disadvantaged people. The Commission has also worked with the public school boards to do the same.

== See also ==
- Human Rights in Canada
- Canadian Human Rights Act
- Section 13 of the Canadian Human Rights Act
- Canadian Human Rights Commission
- Court of Appeal for Nova Scotia
- Supreme Court of Canada
- Canadian Islamic Congress human rights complaint against Maclean's Magazine
- Black Nova Scotians

== Bibliography ==
- Bridglal Pachai, (Ed). Nova Scotia Human Rights Commission: 25th Anniversary: A History 1967-1992. 1992.
