= Wellington Ney States =

Canadian Baptist clergyman (1874-1927)

Wellington N. States
- Born: Wellington Ney States; October 1, 1874; Wolfville, Nova Scotia
- Died: May 3, 1927 (aged 52); Dartmouth, Nova Scotia
- Occupations: Baptist clergyman; Carpenter

Wellington Ney States (October 1, 1874 – May 3, 1927) was a Canadian Baptist clergyman who built and restored many Baptist churches throughout Nova Scotia.

== Early life and education ==
Wellington Ney States was born in Wolfville, Nova Scotia, on October 1, 1874. He was born to Job States and Mary McCulla.

After losing his parents at age nine, he was brought up in Kingsport by his maternal grandparents. In his mid-teens, he lived with his father's family in Mount Denson. States later returned to Wolfville to pursue a calling to the Christian ministry.

States began studying at Horton Academy in Wolfville by 1891, a preparatory institution for Acadia University. After leaving in 1895, he assisted Pastor Gilbert James Coulter White in Annapolis Royal, where he was baptized and mentored. He returned to Wolfville in 1897, perhaps aiming for matriculation, but instead went to Halifax, joined the African Baptist Church (now New Horizons Baptist Church), and met James Robinson Johnston.

== Career ==
States received his preaching license in 1898 from the African United Baptist Association (AUBA). That year, he worked at Granville Ferry and Inglewood.

In April 1899, States defied convention and became the first Black licentiate ordained in the Baptist Convention of the Maritime Provinces. He was ordained at Annapolis by the late Rev. G. Coulter White.

In 1903, the field missionary of the AUBA baptized ten people at Cobequid Road, Middle Sackville. He was part of the council formed to establish a church in the area. Through his trade as a carpenter, he contributed to the construction of countless Black churches in Nova Scotia. He built churches in Cobequid Road, Delaps Cove, Granville Ferry, Hammonds Plains, New Glasgow, and Sunnyville, and oversaw major renovations in Beech Hill, Cherrybrook, Dartmouth, Falmouth, and Inglewood.

He relocated to New Glasgow, Nova Scotia in 1906 to serve as pastor of Second Baptist Church.

In 1917, States was denied the chance to go overseas as chaplain of the No. 2 Construction Battalion due to mild tuberculosis and Rev. William A. White was chosen instead.

He led New Glasgow's Second Baptist Church for thirteen years. When Second Baptist Church could no longer pay his salary in 1919, States moved on to his final post at the Victoria Road Baptist Church in Dartmouth, Nova Scotia. Rev. W. N. States held the pastorates at Dartmouth and Cherrybrook, where he ministered for eight years until his death. A fellow Wolfville native, the Reverend Dr. William Pearly Oliver was his rightful successor.

== Personal life ==
Residing in New Glasgow, he married Muriel Viola States of Avonport on December 4, 1907. They had three children. His wife, Muriel Viola States, organized a meeting for young men on October 29, 1929, resulting in the creation of the Men's Progressive Club of Hammonds Plains.

States was active in fraternal societies, once serving as Grand Master of the Loyal Wilberforce Lodge, IOOF, composed entirely of Black Nova Scotians. He also frequently attended the Grand Lodge as a delegate.

== Death ==
Wellington Ney States died on May 3, 1927, in Dartmouth, Nova Scotia, Canada. He succumbed to pneumonia.

== Legacy ==
On May 5, 1929, a monument was unveiled in Dartmouth's Presbyterian Cemetery honoring him, bearing the inscription: "To the memory of the late Rev. Wellington N. States, 1877–1927, Christian Gentleman, Church Builder, Race Leader."

== See also ==
- Black Nova Scotians
