= Bridglal Pachai =

South African-born Canadian historian (1927–2019)

Bridglal Pachai CM ONS
- Born: November 30, 1927; Umbulwana, Natal province, Union of South Africa
- Died: November 27, 2019 (aged 91); Halifax, Nova Scotia, Canada
- Education: University of South Africa
- Occupations: Educator, Historian, Writer
- Spouse: Leela Pachai
- Writing career
- Genres: Nova Scotia History, Autobiography
- Notable works: Beneath the Clouds of the Promised Land; Peoples of the Maritimes: Blacks; Historic Black Nova Scotia (2006); My Africa, My Canada (1989); Accidental Opportunities (2007)

Bridglal Pachai CM ONS (30 November 1927 – 27 November 2019) was a South African-born Canadian educator, historian and author. Born in Umbulwana, Natal, he went to school in nearby Ladysmith, and later graduated with a doctorate in 1963.

== Career ==
Pachai earned B.A. and M.A. degrees in History from the University of South Africa and a Ph.D. in History, from the University of Natal. His thesis was the twenty-one years that Mahatma Gandhi spent in South Africa from 1893 to 1914. From 1947 to 1962, he worked as a school teacher for the Department of Education in Natal, South Africa.

Pachai's first university post was as a Lecturer in History, at the University College of Cape Coast, Ghana, from 1962 to 1965, after which he moved to the University of Malawi where he taught history from 1965 to 1975, becoming Professor of History and Dean. In 1979, Pachai returned to Africa, becoming the inaugural Dean of the Faculty of Arts at the University of Sokoto, Nigeria (1979–1985). Many years later, he would spend a year teaching in The Gambia (1998).

Pachai returned permanently to Nova Scotia in 1985, where he became the executive director of the Black Cultural Centre (1985 to 1989) and, subsequently, the Nova Scotia Human Rights Commission (1989 to 1994).

== Author and historian ==
He became an authority on African Nova Scotian history, penning several books on the subject, including Beneath the Clouds of the Promised Land (Volumes 1 and 2, 1987 and 1991), Peoples of the Maritimes: Blacks (1987, 1993), and Historic Black Nova Scotia (2006). He wrote about his life in two autobiographies, My Africa, My Canada (1989) and Accidental Opportunities (2007). In all, he published some 20 books.

== Personal life ==
Pachai and his wife Leela had five children; three sons and two daughters.

== Death and legacy ==
He was made a member of the Order of Canada in 2002 and in 2006 was a recipient of the Gandhi, King, Ikeda Award (Morehouse College).

He died in Halifax on 27 November 2019 at age 91.
