= Joan Jones =

Black Canadian business woman and activist

Joan Carol Jones
- Born: Joan Carol Bonner; September 26, 1939; Buffalo, New York, U.S.
- Died: April 1, 2019 (aged 79); Halifax, Nova Scotia, Canada
- Resting place: Camp Hill Cemetery, Halifax
- Education: Oakville Trafalgar High School
- Occupations: Business owner and beautician, Legal Aid activist and newspaper columnist
- Known for: Civil Rights leader who motivated a generation of black Nova Scotians
- Spouse: Rocky Jones

Joan Carol Jones (September 26, 1939 – April 1, 2019) was a Canadian businesswoman and civil rights activist who was born in the United States and raised in Ontario, Canada. She was married to Black Nova Scotian and internationally known political activist Rocky Jones, whom she influenced to become more active in the issues of black activism causes espoused by Malcolm X and writer James Baldwin, during the black radicalism period of the 1960s. Together they were among the founders of Kwacha House, an interracial youth club in Halifax and were later instrumental in bringing Stokely Carmichael and the Black Panther Party to Halifax. They adopted the radicalized language of the Panthers and organized with Carmichael's help the Black United Front, taking on issues of police brutality, employment and housing discrimination in the black community.

== Early life and education ==
Joan Bonner was born to Eugene and Elsie Bonner in Buffalo, New York in 1939. The family moved to Oakville, Ontario where she attended school, graduating from Oakville Trafalgar High School. She went seeking work opportunities in Toronto, where she met and married Burnley Jones, a fifth-generation African Canadian whose lineage went back to the late 18th century. The couple left the province, moving to Halifax, Nova Scotia where they joined the relatively small black community and academia where Burnley taught at Dalhousie and was instrumental in creating the Black Historical and Educational Research Organization (HERO Project), a pioneering oral history project on Black culture. Together in 1965 they formed Kwacha House; Eastern Canada's first inner-city self-help program for the culturally diverse, lower socio-economic population.

== Civil Rights Movement ==
The group of civil rights idealists that held court in Joan and Rocky's (as Burnley was known) kitchen discussed many of the same issues the African-American civil rights were concerned with, namely entrenched racism. Nova Scotia was the destination for American slaves, Black Loyalists who had fought for the British and following the American revolutionary war's conclusion had come from as far south as the Carolinas thru often hostile territory to refuge in Canada and additionally, refugees from the War of 1812. When the British moved rebellious Maroons from Jamaica to Sierra Leone they sojourned in farming communities about Nova Scotia before emigrating in 1800, with descendants remaining in Halifax and other cities, leading to a significant population of minorities who complained of discrimination in housing and employment. This community was not large enough to gain any political power and school segregation had persisted, with blacks disproportionately subject to high drop-out rates, over policing and incarceration and high unemployment. One particular event mid-sixties was the urban renewal project which resulted in the demolition of a Halifax community known as Africville.

The Joneses were part of an emerging black empowerment movement and while Rocky was the face of black radicalism in the media, Joan was the driving force and intellectual organizer behind many of the political events that their home became the locus of and to those involved in Civil Rights activism. Joan ran the day to day operation at Kwacha House, where impoverished youth found programs designed to end the cycle of school dropout and incarceration; and could also gain self-empowerment, which continued for decades under her supervision.

In 1968 the Joneses brought the Black Panther Party to Halifax, forming with their help the Black United Front as a bulwark against employment and housing discrimination, and confronting the authorities on police brutality. This brought them under racist police surveillance, which ended in 1994 when the surveillance was revealed. The Royal Canadian Mounted Police apologized through the then Police Commissioner, Phillip Murray. Ms Jones, by then divorced from Rocky, told a newspaper that the apology did not undo the damage caused over the previous 30 years, as lost employment opportunities, shunning in economic endeavors and other negative attributes had had a detrimental effect to the couple during their best years. She said,

“ I strongly believe that they interfered in our ability to have certain jobs or to have an income in this city.”

== Career ==
She held jobs in the Canadian public works department and in the provisional government. She was a business-woman and owner of two boutiques, also doing work at Nova Scotia's office of Legal Aid from which she retired in 2008. Her 1990's column on race relations were regularly printed in the Chronicle Herald of Halifax, which also published a memorial after her death. It was noted that while she kept writing her column, the newspaper got all types of negative mail, including hate mail directed at her column. Interviewed about her Black History Month observances in 1995 when she led the push for its becoming a national observance (BHM became nationally observed in Canada in 1996), she stated that while black racial issues seem insurmountable, she would continue the fight to end racism and would continue to be a role model to youth because the battle was important.

"It's part of our responsibility to educate, nurture and bring along the next group that are going to have to deal with those things."

== Death ==
Jones died of unspecified causes on April 1, 2019, at the age of 79. She is survived by daughters Tracey and Casey, sons Agassou, Patrick and Shaka, 13 grandchildren and four great-grandchildren. Rocky preceded her in 2013, they remained close friends up until he passed.

== See also ==
- Black Panther Party
- Speak It! From the Heart of Black Nova Scotia
- Malcolm X
- Black Cultural Centre for Nova Scotia
- Black Nova Scotians
- Viola Desmond
