= Vale Road =

Corridor in Nova Scotia, Canada

Coordinates: 45.5781°N 62.6336°W

Vale Road is a corridor in the south end of New Glasgow, Nova Scotia that forms the centre of the African Nova Scotian community in Pictou County. Established by descendants of Black Loyalists and other early Black settlers to the region, the Vale Road area developed a distinct social, religious, and cultural life that has shaped New Glasgow for more than a century. Today it remains a focal point of African Nova Scotian heritage, anchored by institutions such as the Ward One Social and Recreation Centre, Second United Baptist Church and the Africentric Heritage Park.

The area's side streets were largely unnamed until advocacy by local members of the Black United Front. One street was named Ghana Avenue to pay homage to the area's West African heritage.

The Black Gala, an annual homecoming event, has been held at Ward One Social & Recreation Centre since 1990.
