= Colored Hockey League =

Canadian ice hockey league, 1894–1930

- Sport: Ice hockey
- Founded: 1894
- Founder: James Borden; James Robinson Johnston; James A.R. Kinney; Henry Sylvester Williams
- Folded: c. 1911 and 1930
- Country: Canada

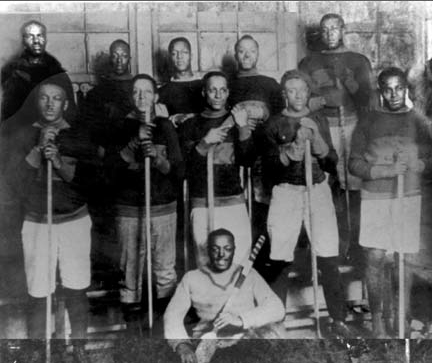
Africville Sea-Sides, c.1921

The Coloured Hockey League of the Maritimes (CHL) was an all-black ice hockey league founded in Nova Scotia in 1894, which featured teams from across Canada's Maritime Provinces. The league operated for several decades lasting until 1930.

== History ==
The league was founded in 1895 in Halifax, Nova Scotia, Canada by a group of four black Baptist leaders and black intellectuals: Pastor James Borden of Dartmouth Church, James A.R Kinney, lawyer and community leader James Robinson Johnston, and lawyer and Pan-African organizer Henry Sylvester Williams. The league was constructed to attract young black men to Sunday worship with the promise of a hockey game between rival churches after the services. According to the Canadian Encyclopedia, "with the influence of the Black Nationalism Movement—and with rising interest in the sport of hockey—the league came to be seen as a potential driving force for the equality of Black Canadians."

Among the teams in the league were the Halifax Eurekas, based in Halifax, and the Amherst Royals, based in Amherst. At its zenith, the league had teams in seven communities in Nova Scotia and one in Prince Edward Island, the West End Rangers from The Bog in Charlottetown.

With as many as a dozen teams, over 400 Black Canadian players from across Nova Scotia, New Brunswick and Prince Edward Island participated in competition. The Colored Hockey League is credited by some as being the first league to allow the goaltender to leave his feet to cover a puck in 1900. This practice was not permitted elsewhere until the formation of the National Hockey League in 1917. It is also claimed that the first player to use the slapshot was Eddie Martin of the Halifax Eureka in 1906.

== Legacy ==
In January 2020, Canada Post issued a postage stamp featuring the 1906 champion Halifax Eurekas to commemorate the history of black hockey players in Canada.

The history of the league is profiled in Darril Fosty and George Fosty's 2004 non-fiction book Black Ice: The Lost History of the Colored Hockey League of the Maritimes, 1895-1925; their 2014 book Tribes: An International Hockey History, which expands on their previous work; and in Hubert Davis's 2022 documentary film Black Ice, based in part on the former book.

The history of the league, including its destruction and the destruction of the black community in Africville by the Halifax government to expand their railway, is also touched on in Canadaland's "Hockey #2 — The Birth of Black Hockey".

== See also ==
- Black players in ice hockey
- Black Nova Scotians
- Soul on Ice (film)
- Ice Breakers (National Film Board)
