= Canadian Forces Medallion for Distinguished Service =

The Canadian Forces Medallion for Distinguished Service (CFMDS) (French: Médaillon des Forces canadiennes pour service distingué) is awarded by the Chief of the Defence Staff in recognition of outstanding service, performed by individuals and groups who are not active members of the Canadian Forces. Establishment of this award was started by General Gérard Charles Édouard Thériault, CMM, CD and finished by his successor General Paul David Manson, OC, CMM, CD in 1987. The award was first approved for presentation in 1989.

== Criteria ==
The CFMDS is awarded for "service of a rare and exceptionally high standard, which accrues great benefit to the CF as a whole." Eligible service must be rendered by persons who are not active members of the Canadian Forces, or members of allied armed forces. Canadian and foreign citizens may be considered for this honour.

Recommendations for the award are submitted to the Canadian Forces Decorations and Commendations Advisory Committee. This committee considers recommendations and submits the names to the Chief of Defence Staff of those who meet the conditions of the award.

Personnel of the Canadian Forces Supplementary Reserve, and individuals holding honorary appointments who are on the Supplementary Reserve list, may be considered for the medallion to recognize non-military service.

== Appearance ==
The current version of the award is a twelve-sided silver medallion, 76 mm in diameter. The obverse displays the Canadian Forces emblem. The emblem is a flying eagle in front of crossed swords, superimposed over an anchor topped by St Edward's Crown. Around the emblem are four maple leaves within the center field of the medallion. The edge of the medallion bears the inscription "DISTINGUISHED SERVICE" on the left and "SERVICE DISTINGUÉ" on the right. The inscriptions are separated by a spray of laurel leaves at the top and bottom edges. The reverse bears a wreath of maple and laurel leaves around the edge. The center is plain so the recipient's name may be engraved.

== Notable recipients ==
- Don Cherry
- Jeremiah Jones
- The Ottawa Hospital
