= The Black Battalion =

1987 Non fiction book

- Author: Calvin W. Ruck
- Original title: The Black Battalion (1916-1920) Canada's best kept military secret
- Language: English
- Subject: Canadian military history, Canadian Black history, civil rights
- Genre: History
- Publisher: Nimbus Publishing Ltd.
- Publication date: 1987
- Media type: Print
- Pages: 116 pp.
- ISBN: 0920852920

The Black Battalion (1916-1920) Canada's best kept military secret is a 1987 book by Calvin Ruck, CM, about the No. 2 Construction Battalion, Canadian Expeditionary Force, the only all-black battalion to serve in World War I. It chronicles the contributions of black Canadians to the Great War (1914-1918), whose military heritage had been forgotten. Ruck served in the Senate of Canada from 1998 to 2000, and was honoured with the Order of Canada and Governor General's Award.

== Context ==
Following the reunion of the Black Battalion on November 12–14, 1982 organized by The Society for the Protection and Preservation of Black Culture in Nova Scotia as its first public event, which brought together nine surviving black WWI veterans, Ruck was inspired to delve into their history. Their contributions to the war effort were largely unknown until the publication of this book.

== Content ==
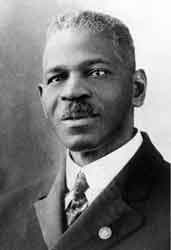
Reverend William A. White – first black officer in the British Empire

Ruck provided the context behind the establishment of the segregated No. 2 Construction Battalion.

Five hundred black soldiers volunteered from Nova Scotia alone, representing 56% of the Black Battalion. It was the only black battalion in Canadian military history and also the only Canadian Battalion composed of black soldiers to serve in World War I. The first black officer in the British Empire, Reverend William A. White led the Battalion.

== Sequel ==
Ruck also published Canada's Black Battalion: No. 2 Construction, 1916-1920 (ISBN 0-921201-00-1)

== See also ==
- Military history of Nova Scotia
- Victoria Rifles (Nova Scotia)
- Captain Runchey's Company of Coloured Men
- Black Nova Scotians
