= James A.R. Kinney =

Canadian stenographer (1879–1940)

- Born: James Alexander Ross Kinney; February 25, 1879; Yarmouth, Nova Scotia
- Died: November 6, 1940 (aged 61); Halifax, Nova Scotia
- Occupations: Stenographer; Advertising manager; Lay Minister

James A.R. Kinney (February 25, 1879 – November 6, 1940) was a Canadian stenographer, African Nova Scotian community leader, and co-founder of the Colored Hockey League of the Maritimes.

== Early life ==
James Alexander Ross Kinney was born on February 25, 1879, in Yarmouth, Nova Scotia.

He was born to Charlotte Forrest and James E.Y. Kinney, a barber. His maternal grandmother arrived in Halifax from New York in 1789 with the Empire Loyalists, while his grandfather had been enslaved in Virginia.

== Career ==
Kinney joined the Cornwallis Street Baptist Church (now New Horizons Baptist Church) as a teenager. He rose to prominence in both the African United Baptist Association of Nova Scotia (AUBA) and the African Nova Scotian community.

In 1895, in Halifax, he organized the Colored Hockey League with three other Black Baptist leaders and intellectuals: Pastor James Borden, James Robinson Johnston, and Henry Sylvester Williams.

Kinney was the first Black graduate of the Maritime Business College. Afterwards, he started working as a stenographer. His first job began in the office of the criminal lawyer John T. Bulmer. He went on to work at Leslie, Hart & Co. at Pickford & Black's wharf, and by 1900 joined Wm. Stairs, Son and Morrow, Limited, becoming their advertising representative by 1913.

A home for orphaned Black Nova Scotians was proposed by James Robinson Johnston in 1908. Following the untimely death of Johnston on March 3, 1915, Kinney took over as the Black community's lay minister and lead advocate for building the home. In 1918, he played a key role in fundraising for the construction of the Nova Scotia Home for Colored Children (NSHCC). He was first elected to the Board of Trustees, then appointed secretary and placed in charge of the 1919 campaign, after which he joined the board of management under president Henry Bauld. When the Colored Home officially opened in 1921, he became its first superintendent. He chose to leave a profitable accounting job to help orphaned and neglected Black children, earning only a living wage.

He was appointed manager of the Nova Scotia Home for Colored Children in April 1925, overseeing its development, finances, and operations. That month, he retired from Wm. Stairs, Son and Morrow, Limited, after 25 years as the advertising manager of the firm. At the time, he was widely known for his advertising and was rated by the press as one of the best in Eastern Canada. He resigned to focus on duties as the NSHCC's manager.

== Personal life ==
His first marriage was to Mary Sarah Allison in Halifax on July 23, 1906. On January 14, 1908, Mary S. Kinney died at 28 years old.

At age 30, Kinney married Nettie Dorothy Fedelia Martin (sister of Percy Seymour Martin) in Amherst on August 30, 1909. The couple, residing at 134 Creighton Street, had a son named James Alexander Ross Kinney Jr. on December 30, 1910.

== Death ==
James A.R. Kinney died in Halifax, Nova Scotia, on November 6, 1940. He was buried at Camp Hill Cemetery.

== See also ==
- New Horizons Baptist Church
- Black Nova Scotians
