= Jeremiah Jones =

Canadian WWI soldier

Jeremiah "Jerry" Alvin Jones
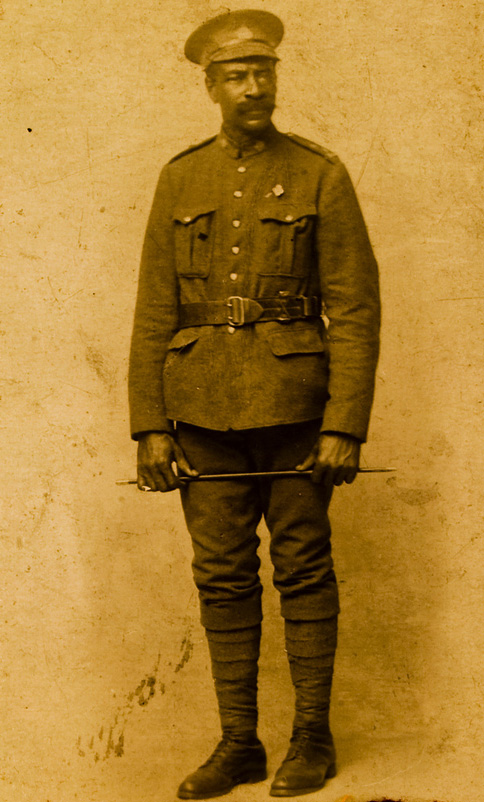
- Born: March 30, 1858; Truro, Nova Scotia
- Died: November 23, 1950 (aged 92); Halifax, Nova Scotia
- Spouse: Ethel Edna Geraldine Cook
- Military career
- Allegiance: Canada
- Branch: 106th Battalion (Nova Scotia Rifles), CEF
- Service years: June 19, 1916–May 8, 1918
- Rank: Private
- Nickname: jerry
- Awards: Canadian Forces Medallion for Distinguished Service

Jeremiah Alvin Jones (March 30, 1858 - November 23, 1950) was a Black Canadian soldier who served in World War I. He was recommended for a Distinguished Conduct Medal however, due to the era of discrimination there is no record of him receiving it. His treatment has been seen as an example of the lack of recognition accorded to Black Canadians and their struggle in fighting for a country in which they were not always seen as equals. Campaigns to have him receive the medal posthumously eventually resulted in his being awarded the Canadian Forces Medallion for Distinguished Service on February 22, 2010.

== Military service ==
Jones enlisted as a private with the 106th Battalion (Nova Scotia Rifles), CEF on June 19, 1916, in Truro, Nova Scotia. He had to lie about his age saying his birthday was on March 29, 1877, which would have made him 39 instead of his real age 58. Jones served in France with The Royal Canadian Regiment. He joined the regiment in the field on 9 Feb 1917 and was evacuated (wounded) to England on 12 April 1917.

During the Battle of Vimy Ridge in World War I, Canadian troops were pinned down by German machine gun fire. Jones volunteered to attack a German gun emplacement. He managed to reach the machine gun nest, tossed a hand grenade and killed several soldiers. The remainder surrendered to him and Jones forced his captives to carry the machine gun back across the battlefield to the Canadian lines, where they were ordered to deposit it at his commanding officer's feet. For his heroics, Private Jones was reportedly recommended for a Distinguished Conduct Medal (DCM) which he was never awarded.

Jones never actually received the DCM, although it was widely reported at the time that he was recommended for it by his commanding officer. Several veterans have since supported the claim that Jones was to be awarded the DCM, but no records have surfaced to prove that he ever received it.

== Campaigns for recognition ==
Over the years, the Truro Daily News has published several articles highlighting Jones' heroics on the battlefield and his recommendation for the DCM. A letter from a Truro soldier based in Witley Camp, Surrey, England on July 29, 1917, that was published in the Truro Daily News, quoted the writer as saying, Jones, "had captured a German machine gun, forced the crew to carry it back to our lines, and, depositing it at the feet of the CO. said;- 'Is this thing any good?'"

On September 21, 1917, Jones's sister Martha told The Truro Daily News that Jones "won the DCM by capturing a German machine gun and crew". The newspaper once again alluded to the medal recommendation, in an article on Jerry's 79th birthday. This time they reported "His valor won for him a recommendation for the DCM"

For most of his adult life, Senator Calvin Ruck lobbied to get the Canadian government to award a medal posthumously to Jones. Senator Ruck argued that the racist climate of the time precluded Jones or other black soldiers from getting their due recognition, and he felt that it would be appropriate for the government to award the medal to Jones on behalf of all black veterans. Senator Ruck died in 2004, without achieving success.

== Posthumous recognition ==
On September 9, 2000, the Last Post Fund erected a new grave stone for Jones with full military honours. The Truro Millennium Committee, 125th Anniversary Committee, and The Jones Family sponsored a tree carving of Jones as part of the Truro Tree Sculpture Project, in November 2000.

On February 22, 2010, the Canadian Government recognized Jones posthumously with the awarding of the Canadian Forces Medallion for Distinguished Service. Rear Admiral Paul Maddison, Commander, Maritime Forces Atlantic/Joint Task Force Atlantic, said, "today, on behalf of General Walter Natynczyk, Chief of the Defence Staff, I feel extremely privileged to finally acknowledge the gallantry of private Jeremiah Jones on the hills of Vimy Ridge in 1917 during the First World War."

== Personal ==
Jeremiah married Ethel Edna Geraldine Cook from Amherst, Nova Scotia, on March 30, 1898. They remained married until her death on February 12, 1940. The couple had 9 children. Jeremiah's grandson was the well-known Nova Scotia activist Rocky Jones (from his son Elmer Alvin Jones).

== See also ==
- Military history of Nova Scotia

== Bibliography ==
Notes

References

- Beaton, Virginia (March 8, 2010). "Recognition comes for a soldier of the Great War" (PDF). Archived from the original (PDF) on 2012-03-12.
- Corfu, Nina (July 5, 2016). "Jeremiah Jones, black soldier and WWI hero, honoured by Parks Canada". CBC News.
- Library and Archives Canada (1992). "Item: JONES, JEREMIAH JERRY (716221)". Library and Archives Canada.
- Sullivan, Harry (February 20, 2010). "Former Truro man being recognized for heroic actions in the Battle of Vimy Ridge". Truro Daily News.
- Truro Daily News (August 17, 1917). "A D.C.M for a Truro Soldier". Truro Daily News. Truro, NS.
- Truro Daily News B, Colchester Historical Society Archives (September 21, 1917). "A D.C.M for a Truro Soldier". Truro Daily News. Truro, NS.
