= Percy Seymour Martin =

Canadian ironworker and infantryman (1890–1968)

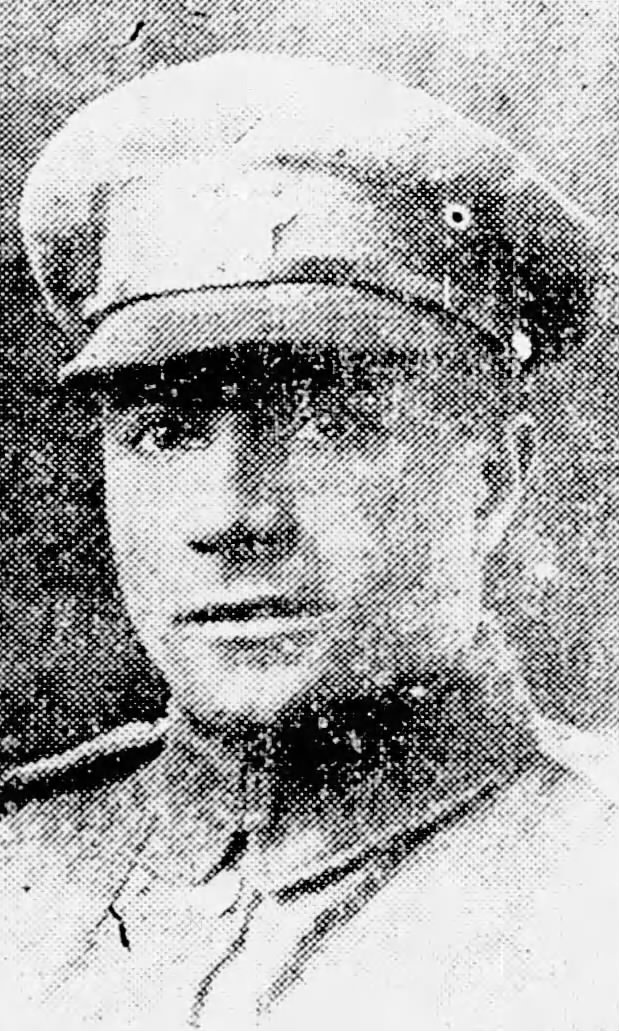
- Born: Percival Seymour Martin; 18 October 1890; Amherst, Nova Scotia, Canada
- Died: June 1968
- Spouse: Inez May Clarette Halfpenny
- Military career
- Allegiance: Canada
- Branch: Canadian Expeditionary Force
- Service years: 1915–1919
- Rank: Private
- Service number: 716251
- Units: 106th Battalion; Royal Canadian Regiment
- Conflicts: First World War; Vimy Ridge; Battle of Hill 70
- Awards: Military Medal

Percy Seymour Martin (October 18, 1890 – 1968) was a Canadian soldier who was the first Black Nova Scotian to receive the Military Medal.

== Early life ==
Percival Seymour Martin was born on October 18, 1890, in Amherst, Cumberland County, Nova Scotia.

His father, Robert Martin, was a truckman.

== Career ==
Percy Martin was employed as an ironworker, a trade classified under a broader category of metal processing. He held a position at the Amherst Malleable Iron Foundry, where his brother Laurence led the department before the building became the Amherst Internment Camp in 1914.

== Military career ==
=== World War I ===
After joining the 106th Battalion in 1915, Martin was transferred to the Royal Canadian Regiment of the Canadian Army.

On July 5, 1916, he enlisted in the Canadian Overseas Expeditionary Force in Truro, Nova Scotia. His unit embarked for Britain to fight in Europe on July 15, 1916. The troops first arrived in England aboard the S.S. Empress of Britain on July 25, 1916. As part of the 106th Battalion and Royal Canadian Regiment, the infantryman was deployed to France.

Pte. Martin was later wounded at Vimy Ridge in April 1917. He was admitted to the 13th Stationary General Hospital in Boulogne on April 10, 1917, with a slight gunshot wound to the left shoulder and was later transferred to the Convalescent Depot on May 2, 1917. After his discharge from the depot on May 13, he returned to major battles from August until the signing of the Armistice of 11 November 1918. While fighting at Lens, Martin was exposed to gas during the Battle of Hill 70.

By February 1919, he was stationed in Germany with his unit within the Canadian Expeditionary Force. Following its demobilization, the Royal Canadian Regiment sailed from Liverpool, England on March 1, 1919, aboard the SS Adriatic for Canada. Martin received his discharge at the Halifax depot. His name was noted in the Evening Mail among the men of the Royal Canadian Regiment who arrived in Halifax on March 9, 1919.

At the end of World War I, Percy Martin was decorated with the Military Medal (MM) on August 9, 1919, the first Black Nova Scotian to receive the honor.

=== World War II ===
By the early 1940s, Martin had relocated to Washington, D.C., and was working for Thomas A. O'Donnell, owner of the O'Donnell's Restaurants at 1209 and 1221 E Street N.W. Amid World War II, Percy Martin, then 52, was included in The Old Man's Draft of April 27, 1942.

== Personal life ==
Percy's brother was Sergeant Laurence Martin of the No. 2 Construction Battalion. His sister was Nettie Dorothy Fedelia Martin who married James A.R. Kinney.

At 22 years old, Percy Martin married Inez May Clarette Halfpenny on October 16, 1912, in Amherst. He had a son named Claude Seymour Martin.

Before going overseas, Percy Martin was superintendent of the Episcopal Methodist Church Sunday School in Amherst.

== See also ==
- Black Nova Scotians
