= Truro Daily News =

Weekly newspaper in Truro, Nova Scotia, Canada

Truro News
- Type: Weekly newspaper
- Format: Tabloid
- Owner(s): SaltWire Network
- Publisher: Mark Lever
- Editor: Harry Sullivan
- Founded: 1891; 134 years ago
- Language: English
- Headquarters: 332 Willow Street; Truro, Nova Scotia; B2N 5A5
- Circulation: 5,800 weekdays 6,675 Saturdays in 2009
- Website: trurodaily.com

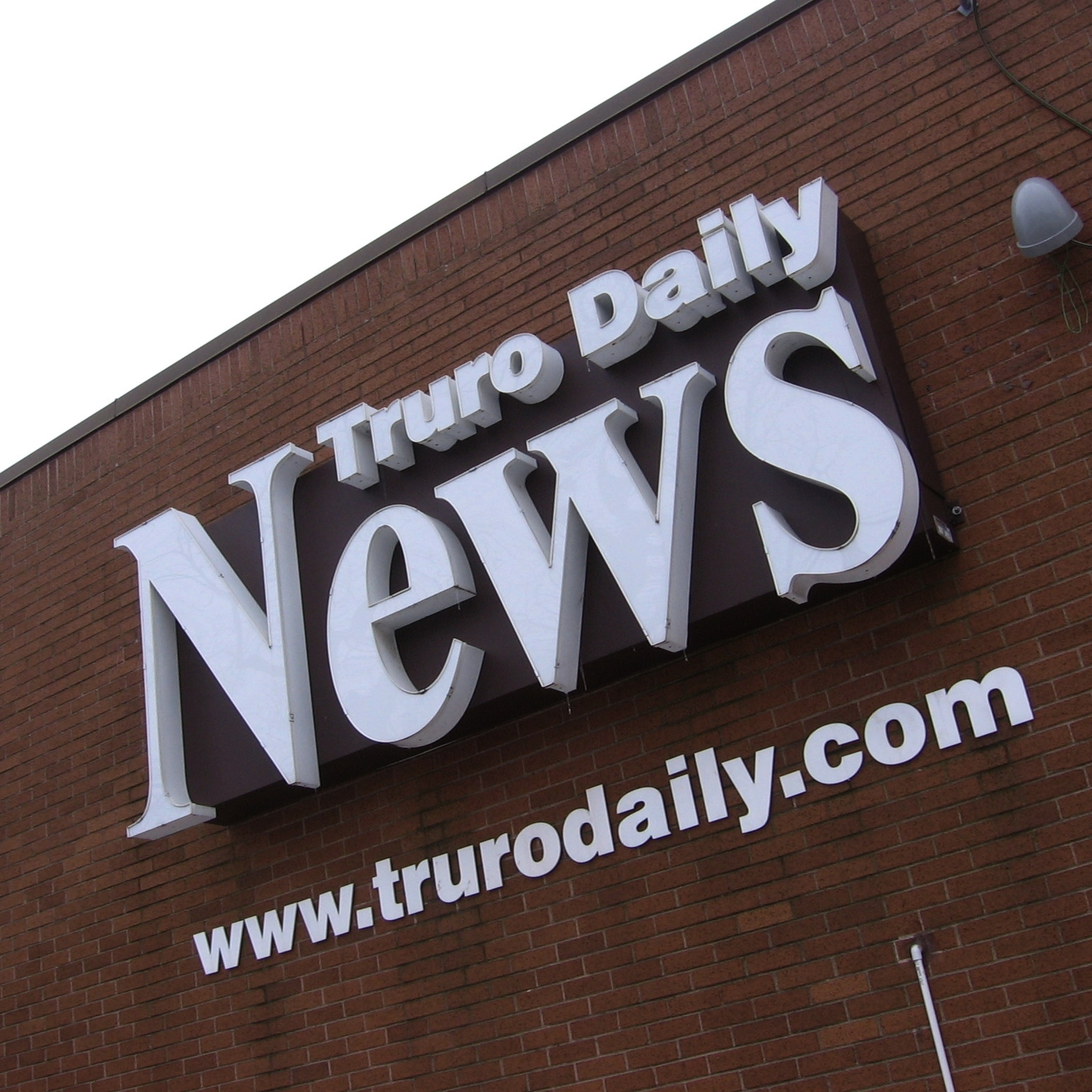
Truro Daily News (Truro, Nova Scotia)

The Truro News is a weekly newspaper in Truro, Nova Scotia, Canada, covering Colchester County.

The paper is currently owned by SaltWire Network, and is sisters with The News in New Glasgow, Nova Scotia and the Cape Breton Post.

== See also ==
- List of newspapers in Canada
