= James Robinson Johnston =

Canadian lawyer and community leader

James R. Johnston
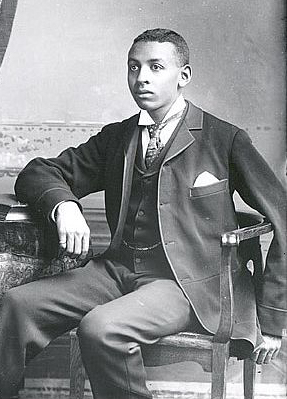
- Born: March 12, 1876; Halifax, Nova Scotia
- Died: March 3, 1915 (aged 38); Halifax, Nova Scotia
- Occupation: Lawyer

James Robinson Johnston (March 12, 1876 – March 3, 1915) was a Canadian lawyer and community leader.

== Early life and education ==
Johnston was born in Halifax on March 12, 1876. He was the eldest of the five sons of William Johnston, a shoemaker, and Elizabeth Ann Thomas. His maternal grandparents were Reverend James Thomas, a white man from Wales who headed the African Baptist Association from 1861 to 1879, and Hannah Saunders, an African Nova Scotian woman.

In the 1880s, Johnston was restricted from attending public school due to Nova Scotia's segregation laws. Under the system in place, black children attended separate schools which suffered from underfunding. At the age of six Johnston began attending school at the black Maynard School. In 1884, the segregation of schools was repealed and by 1887 he was attending the Albro Street School, making Johnston the first Black student to attend a White school. The following year he transferred to the Halifax Academy. Throughout his school years, he was recognized as a brilliant student and upon graduating in 1892 at the age of sixteen enrolled at Dalhousie College (Dalhousie University). He graduated in 1896 with a Bachelor of Letters and then entered Dalhousie Law School. Graduating in 1898, he was the first black Nova Scotian to graduate from university. After graduating law school, Johnston articled and was called to the Bar in 1900.

== The Church ==
Johnston joined the African Baptist Association in about 1886 at the young age of ten. His family had been long-standing members of the Cornwallis Street Baptist Church and he followed this well-worn path, becoming an officer of the church, President of the Baptists Young People's Union, superintendent of the Sunday School, and a member of the finance committee. In 1899 he became a field missionary thus helping to support other Black Baptist churches throughout Nova Scotia. In 1906 he became secretary of the African Baptist Association.

== Political affiliation ==
The Conservative Party had been instrumental in the repeal of the school segregation laws in Nova Scotia so it was only natural that Johnston became a member of the party. He was a young contemporary of Sir Robert Borden, who at the time of Johnston being called to the Nova Scotia Bar was President of the Nova Scotia Barristers' Society and Federal leader of the Conservative party. Borden would go on to become Prime Minister of Canada.

== Law practice ==
After law school, he worked for John Thomas Bulmer. In 1901, Bulmer died suddenly and Johnston assumed the practice. Johnston did not restrict himself from taking cases of only defending Blacks or minor cases only to be heard in the minor courts; as White society of the time expected. Johnston represented those who needed his legal services, regardless of being black or white, rich or poor, residing in Halifax or if need be traveling to other areas of the Province. He defended his clients in the police court, county court, as well as the Supreme Court of Nova Scotia.

== Community service ==
Johnston due to his family background, church upbringing, as well as education, knew he had a unique position that enabled him to positively effect change that would benefit his black community. His network of contacts and influence grew through his membership in organizations such as the Aetna Club (President), African Baptist Association (Secretary), Coloured People's Celebration Committee (for the 50th-anniversary celebrations of the African Baptist Association), Order of the Good Templars (District Chief - the higher position in Halifax), Independent Order of Oddfellows (Secretary), and joined the Freemasons' Union Lodge (Master).

In 1908, Johnston suggested creating a preparatory agricultural and industrial school, along the lines of the Tuskegee School for young blacks. He along with orders in the community continued to lobby for the school and in 1914 had the idea presented to the Halifax Board of Trade and the Nova Scotia Legislature. The advent of World War I brought this and other ideas to an end. Johnston, as part of his idea for the agricultural and industrial school, initiated the push for the creation of the Nova Scotia Home for Colored Children for orphaned and neglected black children. In 1915, one month after his death, the Nova Scotia Government passed legislation making the school a reality. Johnston is rightly recognized as one of the School's co-founders. He and co-founder James A.R. Kinney were original officials of the Colored Hockey League.

== Death ==
On the evening of March 3, 1915, after returning from work to celebrate his wife's birthday, he was shot twice in his home by his brother-in-law, Harry Allen. Johnston was wounded, but pursued his brother-in-law into the street where a struggle over the gun ensued. He was then shot three more times; this time fatally.

== Personal life ==
On February 26, 1902, he married Janie (Jennie) May Allen in Windsor Junction, Nova Scotia. In 1910 Janie gave birth to a son, he died in 1911 of meningitis.

== See also ==
- Cornwallis Street Baptist Church

== Sources ==
- Justin Marcus Johnston. James Robinson Johnston - The Life, Death and Legacy of Nova Scotia's First Black Lawyer. Nimbus Publishing, 2005.
