= Mayann Francis =

Lieutenant governor of Nova Scotia from 2006 to 2012

The Honourable Mayann Francis OC ONS

31st Lieutenant Governor of Nova Scotia
- In office September 7, 2006 – April 12, 2012
- Monarch: Elizabeth II
- Governors General: Michaëlle Jean; David Johnston
- Premier: Rodney MacDonald; Darrell Dexter
- Preceded by: Myra Freeman
- Succeeded by: John James Grant

Personal details
- Born: February 18, 1946 (age 80) Sydney, Nova Scotia, Canada
- Education: Saint Mary's University; New York University
- Profession: Civil servant

Mayann Elizabeth Francis (born February 18, 1946) is a human rights advocate and public servant who served as the 31st Lieutenant Governor of the Canadian province of Nova Scotia.

== Early life and education ==
Born in Sydney, Nova Scotia and raised in Whitney Pier, she is the daughter of George A. Francis, an Archpriest and Vicar General of the African Orthodox Church, and Thelma D. Francis. She is a graduate of Saint Mary's University and completed graduate studies at New York University.

== Career ==
She was the director and CEO of the Nova Scotia Human Rights Commission from 1999-2006. She also served as Nova Scotia's provincial ombudsman from December 2000 until December 2003, the first woman to be appointed to that post. Previously, she served in senior positions with the Government of Ontario, Dalhousie University and the District Attorney's office in Kings County, New York.

== Community involvement ==
She is a past member of United Way/Centraide, the Mascoll Foundation, the board of governors at University College of Cape Breton (now Cape Breton University), the general council of the Canadian National Institute for the Blind and she sat on Nova Scotia's Voluntary Planning Board. Francis has been recognized for her outstanding achievements with a Harry Jerome Award, an award from the Multicultural Education Council of Nova Scotia and a Golden Jubilee Medal. She is a member of the African Orthodox Church, a church formed in the late 19th century mainly for the African American community in the United States.

== As Lieutenant Governor ==
On June 20, 2006, she was appointed by Governor General Michaëlle Jean, on the advice of Prime Minister Stephen Harper, to the office of Lieutenant Governor of Nova Scotia; she assumed office on September 7, 2006. Francis is the first Black Nova Scotian and the second woman to serve as Lieutenant Governor of Nova Scotia.

In May 2008, Lieutenant Governor Francis was awarded a Doctorate of Humane Letters from Mount Saint Vincent University.

On February 16, 2012, Prime Minister Stephen Harper announced the appointment of Brigadier General (Retired) John James Grant, CMM, CD as the 32nd Lieutenant Governor of Nova Scotia. Francis was succeeded on April 12, 2012.

== After serving ==
In 2016, Francis spoke out in response to a recent case of racial profiling in a retail setting in Nova Scotia. She validated the complaint, stating that she herself was the target of racial profiling while shopping at least once a month.

In 2026, she was named as an Officer of the Order of Canada. She lives in Halifax, Nova Scotia.

== Arms ==
Coat of arms of Mayann Francis
Notes The arms of Mayann Francis consist of: Crest A ragdoll cat sejant guardant proper holding a torch Sable enflamed Or. Escutcheon Sable two sugar canes in saltire between in chief an Orthodox cross, in base a cross patonce Or and in the flanks two eagle heads erased Argent beaked Or. Supporters Two horses Argent crined and ulements
