= 106th Battalion (Nova Scotia Rifles), CEF =

Canadian Expeditionary Force unit

- Active: 1915–1917
- Country: Canada
- Branch: Canadian Army
- Type: Infantry
- Size: Battalion
- Garrison/HQ: Truro, Nova Scotia
- Motto: None So Reliable
- Engagements: World War I

Commanders
- Notable commanders: Lieutenant-Colonel Robert Innes

The 106th Battalion (Nova Scotia Rifles), CEF was a unit in the Canadian Expeditionary Force during the First World War. Based in Truro, Nova Scotia, with two additional companies in Pictou and Springhill, the unit began recruiting on 18 November 1915. The battalion was the first rifle regiment in Maritime Canada. The battalion sailed to England on 16 July 1916 and trained at Lower Dibgate, Shorncliffe. It was later broken up and most members were absorbed into the 40th Battalion (Nova Scotia), CEF.

Its first commanding officer was Walter Allen, a carriage maker in Truro who had been active in the pre-war militia and had joined the 17th Battalion as a captain in 1914. When the 17th became a reserve unit, he was promoted to major and transferred into the 15th Battalion but lasted less than a month before being wounded. He was sent home, then was appointed commanding officer of the 106th, presumably on the basis of his brief battlefield experience. His unusual wound was under investigation, however, and two months later he was court-martialled for "behaving in a scandalous manner, unbecoming the character of an officer and a gentleman." His improbable replacement was Lieutenant Colonel Robert Innes, a twenty-four-year-old Major who served with the 87th Battalion (Canadian Grenadier Guards) from Coldbrook, Nova Scotia, then living in Ottawa, who had militia experience but also, it would appear, Conservative party connections.

Private Jeremiah Jones, who enlisted with the 106th Battalion, was awarded the Canadian Forces Medallion for Distinguished Service for valour at the Battle of Vimy Ridge with The Royal Canadian Regiment.

The 106th Battalion is perpetuated by The Nova Scotia Highlanders.
