= Rocky Jones =

Canadian politician (1941–2013)

- Born: August 26, 1941; Truro, Nova Scotia
- Died: July 29, 2013 (aged 71); Halifax, Nova Scotia
- Occupations: Lawyer, Educator, Organizer
- Known for: Human Rights Activism
- Political party: New Democratic Party
- Spouse(s): Joan Jones; Sharon Jones

Burnley Allan "Rocky" Jones ONS (August 26, 1941 – July 29, 2013) was an African-Nova Scotian and an internationally known political activist in the areas of human rights, race and poverty. He came to prominence first as a member of the Student Union for Peace Action (SUPA) during the 1960s and then as a civil rights activist, community organizer, educator, and lawyer.

== Family ==
Rocky Jones was born to Elmer and Willena Jones in Truro, Nova Scotia as one of 10 children. His grandfather, Jeremiah Jones, was a hero during the Battle of Vimy Ridge in World War I. Jones was a fifth-generation African Canadian and could trace his Canadian roots back to the Black Refugees of the early 19th century. He grew up in a close-knit working-class neighborhood with white and black families. He did not face overt racism until he was old enough to attend junior high school. After leaving school, he went into the Canadian army and then spent some time "on the road and in the streets" and held a number of jobs. In Toronto he came under the influence of local leaders in the black community, including Harry Gairey and Leonard Johnston. He was also influenced by Eugene Bonner, whom he recalled as "very political, very aware of Black issues and foreign issues. He was a real nationalist, a union man too." He met Bonner through his daughter, Joan, who also encouraged Jones's political development and reading interests. Joan and Rocky married in 1961.

== Civil Rights Movement ==
In March 1965, Rocky and Joan and their daughter joined a demonstration organized by the Canadian group, Friends of the Student Nonviolent Coordinating Committee (SNCC), outside the American Consulate in Toronto, Ontario. The protest was in support of the Selma to Montgomery, Alabama march for voting rights. Almost at once, the media began to refer to Jones as "Canada's Own Stokely Carmichael." He also joined the Student Union for Peace Action (SUPA), and together with Joan, moved to Halifax, Nova Scotia to engage in a community organizing effort known as the Nova Scotia Project. They formed Kwacha House, the first inner-city self-help program for youth in the culturally diverse, lower socio-economic area of the city's North End. In 1968, Jones was responsible for inviting Carmichael and members of the Black Panther Party to visit Halifax. This attracted police and media attention but also led shortly afterwards to the formation of a coalition of activist groups, including more conservative older organizations, as the Black United Front of Nova Scotia. Jones also helped establish the Afro-Canadian Liberation Movement and was sometimes referred to in the media at this time as "Rocky the Revolutionary." As a student at Dalhousie University, in 1970 he helped establish the Transition Year Program (where he taught for 10 years). He organized the Black Historical and Educational Research Organization (HERO Project), a pioneering oral history project on Black culture. He also helped create the Dalhousie Law School Indigenous Blacks and Mi'kmaq Program.

== Prisoner rights ==
A strong advocate of prisoner rights, Jones was involved in the establishment of the Black Inmates Association and the Native Brotherhood of Dorchester Penitentiary and Springhill Institution. Jones developed programs for women in the Kingston Prison for Women, Halifax County Correctional Centre and in the community. He developed a wilderness experience program for ex-inmates and oversaw two production companies also staffed by ex-inmates. Jones was the executive director of Real Opportunities for Prisoner Employment (ROPE), a self-help organization for ex-inmates.

== Politics ==
Jones joined the New Democratic Party in Nova Scotia in 1965 and remained active as an organizer and supporter in the following decades. In 1980, he ran unsuccessfully in a Nova Scotia by-election for Halifax Needham. At that time, he was one of the few known Black Canadian politicians. In 1995, Jones was co-chair of the People's Summit, an alternative assembly that took place during the G7 meetings in Halifax. In 2009 he helped Lenore Zann win her successful campaign to be elected as NDP member of the legislative assembly for the Truro area.

== Legal career ==
Jones received his law degree from Dalhousie University in 1992 and spent several years working with Dalhousie University Legal Aid before forming his own law firm, B.A. "Rocky" Jones & Associates. While at Dalhousie, he provided legal services and taught law students. Jones' firm concentrated on human rights cases, criminal, prisoner rights and labour law. Jones was particularly interested in human rights issues involving Black people and people of colour. He worked closely with the Aboriginal community on land claims, justice and educational issues and was a Canadian expert on environmental racism. In 1997 he successfully argued the groundbreaking case of R. v. R.D.S. before the Supreme Court of Canada. This case set a precedent for race related litigation and contextualized judging. Guelph University bestowed an Honorary Doctorate of Laws to Jones in 2004.

== Death ==
Jones died of heart failure on July 29, 2013, at the age of 71.

== Legacy ==
In August 2016, Fernwood Publishing released the autobiography Burnley “Rocky” Jones Revolutionary. The book was written by James W. St. G. Walker and Rocky Jones, and includes an afterword by George Elliott Clarke.

In September 2018, a petition was started by Angel Panag, a Halifax resident, requesting Cornwallis Street in North End, Halifax be renamed to honour Rocky Jones. The petition was signed by over 1,700 people, and presented to Halifax City Council by the area's City Councillor. The same petition was again presented to Halifax Regional Council in October 2021, after having garnered 9,330 signatures.

== Awards ==
- Order of Nova Scotia
- Meritorious Award of Excellence: The *Black United Front of Nova Scotia
- Distinguished Service Award: The Canadian Association of Black Lawyers
- H.Carl Goldenberg, Q.C. Award: Dalhousie University Law School
- Hon. G.I. Smith Trust Award: Dalhousie University Law school
- Founders Award: The Transition Year Program, Dalhousie University
- Graduate Scholarship: Dalhousie University
- Community Involvement Award: The National Black Coalition of Canada
- Race Relations Committee Award: The Nova Scotia Barristers Society
- Apex Community Award: Town of Truro
- Honorary Doctorate of Laws: Guelph University
- Wall of Honour: Nova Scotia Black Cultural Centre

== See also ==
- Black Nova Scotians
