= William Pearly Oliver =

Canadian social justice leader (1912–1989)

Reverend William Pearly Oliver
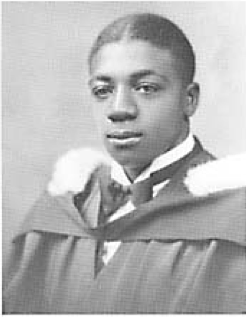
- William Pearly Oliver, 1934
- Born: February 11, 1912; Wolfville, Nova Scotia
- Died: May 26, 1989 (aged 77); Lucasville, Nova Scotia
- Education: BA (1934); BD (1936) Acadia University
- Alma mater: Acadia University
- Known for: Instrumental in developing the Nova Scotia Association for the Advancement of Colored People (1945); Nova Scotia Human Rights Commission (1967); Black United Front (1969); Black Cultural Centre for Nova Scotia (1983)
- Spouse: Pearleen Borden Oliver
- Children: William P., Philip W. B., Dr. Leslie H., Jules R., and Stephen D.
- Parents: Clifford Oliver from Wolfville (father); Dorothy Moore from Halifax (mother)
- Relatives: Grandfather, William Oliver, Wolfville
- Awards: Order of Canada (1985)

William Pearly Oliver OC CM (February 11, 1912 in Wolfville, Nova Scotia – May 26, 1989 in Lucasville) worked at the Cornwallis Street Baptist Church for twenty-five years (1937–1962) and was instrumental in developing the four leading organizations to support Black Nova Scotians in the 20th century: Nova Scotia Association for the Advancement of Colored People (1945), the Nova Scotia Human Rights Commission (1967), the Black United Front (1969) and the Black Cultural Centre for Nova Scotia (1983). He was instrumental in supporting the case of Viola Desmond. Oliver was awarded the Order of Canada in 1984.

His wife Pearleen Oliver was also a strong advocate for social justice.

== Early years ==
Oliver's great-great-grandfather was one of about 2,000 Black Loyalists who came to Nova Scotia after the War of 1812. From 1880 to 1934, his grandfather, William Oliver, served as "caretaker of the Ladies Seminary and later College Hall at Acadia University". His parents were Clifford Oliver from Wolfville and Dorothy Moore from Halifax. His father also worked as a caretaker and janitor at the university. Oliver was born in 1912 in Wolfville, Nova Scotia.

== Education ==
Oliver graduated from Wolfville High School in 1930. Oliver was captain of both the football and hockey teams which won league championships. He completed his BA in 1934 and his Bachelor of Divinity in 1936 at Acadia University. He was the third black person to graduate from university in Nova Scotia. Because of segregation in Nova Scotia he was not able undertake the travel necessary for university sports so he focused on track and field winning "most of the five-mile and ten-mile races in the Valley and in other parts" of Nova Scotia.

== Cornwallis Street Baptist Church ==
In 1937, shortly after graduating with his Divinity Degree, Oliver became a pastor at the Cornwallis Street Baptist Church in Halifax. The Cornwallis church was known as the African United Baptist Association's (AUBA) "Mother Church" as it was the first Nova Scotian church owned and operated by the Black community. Reverend Oliver was the youngest minister to serve at the Cornwallis church. Both the Reverend and Pearleen Oliver ministered to the Cornwallis Street congregation promoting racial equality in education and employment, and providing "support ministry services to other Black churches in Nova Scotia". He served there from 1937 to 1962 and was their longest serving minister since the founder of the church, Richard Preston. They were both active members of the African United Baptist Association.

== War service ==
Reverend William A. White, the previous Cornwallis Street minister who died in 1936, had served as chaplain during World War I with the No. 2 Construction Battalion Canadian Expeditionary Force (CEF); Reverend Oliver was a captain in the Canadian armed service, serving as chaplain during World War II for the high concentration of Black troops from the three Canadian army services and the Merchant Navy that was stationed in Halifax, Nova Scotia. He was the only Black chaplain and he was only allowed to minister to the Black troops in the segregated city of Halifax. Near the end of the war, in 1945, inspired by the troops who had served in desegregated units during the war, Oliver helped establish the Nova Scotia Association for the Advancement of Colored People in 1945.

== NSAACP ==
Oliver was one of the founding members of the Nova Scotia Association for the Advancement of Coloured People (NSAACP)—incorporated in 1945. In 1949, he was awarded a Carnegie Travel Bursary to "study educational programs in the United States" because of his contributions to the NSAACP.

The Olivers supported Viola Desmond's 1946 stand against segregation by refusing to leave her seat in the Roseland Theatre in New Glasgow, Nova Scotia. They helped raised funds through the NSAACP for her defense. Although Desmond lost her court cases and had to pay a $20 fine, Reverend Oliver later said that he was convinced that much of the positive action that has since taken place [in Nova Scotia] stemmed from this incident.

== Nova Scotia Department of Education ==
Oliver worked part-time for the Department of Education's Adult Education Program from 1946 to 1962. He advised the department on programs in Black Communities. It was during this period that Continuing Education and Community Development programs were undertaken. The Adult Education division of Nova Scotia's Department of Education had been established in 1945 with Guy Henson (1910–1978) as director. In 1949, Oliver visited the United States through the Carnegie grant and was introduced to new ways of "improving educational opportunities for Black communities at home."

Oliver worked full-time with the department as the Regional Representative of Continuing Education for the Halifax-Dartmouth and Halifax County from 1962 until his retirement on February 28, 1977. He "identified six goals for the Black community: improved health and schools, better homes and farms, more jobs and better use of municipal and provincial agencies." During this time he "was instrumental in the organization and initiating of many community services such as Adult Education Evening Classes, organization of community schools in Halifax County, Small Business Management Training in the Province of Nova Scotia, and as Secretary to the Education Fund for Black Students."

== Black United Front ==
Against the backdrop of the Civil Rights Movement in the United States, in November 1968, Stokely Carmichael of the American Black Panthers met with leaders of the Black community in Nova Scotia. Oliver disagreed with the Black Panthers' tactics, but shared their concerns and goals. Oliver, Burnley "Rocky" Jones and others established the Black United Front (BUF)—also known as the Black United Front of Nova Scotia as the successor to the NSAACP. The organization remained in operation until 1996. The "BUF consulted broadly and presented recommendations to provincial and federal leaders. The BUF asked for support to promote the teaching of African Canadian history and culture in schools and communities; build Black-owned businesses; and improve Black housing, education and job opportunities."

== Black Cultural Centre for Nova Scotia ==
In 1972, Oliver drew up the original proposal for the creation of a Cultural Educational Centre and the Society for Protection and Preservation of Black Culture in Nova Scotia, also known as the Black Culture Society. The Black Cultural Centre for Nova Scotia, which was established in 1983, fulfils that role by partnering with organizations such as the African Nova Scotian Music Association (ANSMA), the African United Baptist Association (AUBA), the Health Association of African Canadians (HAAC), the Nova Scotia Department of Tourism, Culture and Heritage, as well as the Black Loyalist Heritage Society (BLHS).

== Boards and committees ==
Over the years Oliver served on the boards of directors for Acadia University, the Nova Scotia Home for Coloured Children, Nova Scotia Rehabilitation Association. He has served on committees and for associations such as the African United Baptist Association of Nova Scotia, the Atlantic Regional Canadian Council of Christians and Jews, the Canadian Association on Adult Education (Nova Scotia Division), Maritime Home for Girls, Halifax-Dartmouth Welfare Council, the Mayor's Committee on Housing for the City of Halifax, the Nova Scotia Civil Liberties Association, Nova Scotia Human Rights and Civil Liberties Federation, the Education Fund for Black Students, Society for Protection and Preservation of Black Culture in Nova Scotia.

== Honours and awards ==
In 1985, Oliver was invested into the Order of Canada for his service to the advancement of African Canadian civil rights.

The Reverend Dr. W. P. Oliver Hall of Fame at the Black Cultural Centre for Nova Scotia is named in his honour.

In 1977, Acadia University bestowed upon Rev. Oliver an honorary degree of Doctor of Civil Laws.

In 2022, the Rev. Dr. William and Dr. Pearleen Oliver Chair of Community Leadership and Social Justice was created at Acadia Divinity College in honour of Oliver and his wife.

== Research on W.P. Oliver ==
In 1972, Colin Thomson submitted his PhD dissertation "W. P. Oliver, black educator" which informed his 1986 book entitled Born with a Call: A Biography of Dr. William Pearly Oliver, C.M. Yale University historian Robin Winks, author of The Blacks in Canada: A History, first published in 1971 with 12 later editions, was the external reader.

== Black cultural renaissance and disconnect from mainstream educators ==
Shortly after Oliver died, in 1989, Halifax Metro Council opened its meeting— which was held at the Black Cultural Centre—recalling" Oliver's "significant work". Three speakers from the immigrant, Black, and Mik'maq communities "spoke of the work going on in their communities, to build up educational achievement and increase participation in schooling and society". One of Oliver's former Adult Education Division colleagues questioned why there were no members of the Black community at the meeting to greet the mainstream adult educators at the centre. He asked why was there "no sharing and integration between the work of the Black community and the mainstream adult educators?"

The Halifax Metro Council realized that they had "little contact with the important adult education work taking place in the African Nova Scotian and First Nations communities in Halifax." Their outreach committee was mainly composed of "middle white class administrators from the major educational institutions". They realized that "there had been a history of involvement by adult educators", citing the example of William Oliver, who had "built up community organization in the Black community through organizations such as the church, school, and the Black United Front". By the early 1990s, "little of the link remained". In the summer of 1991, when there was a "racial riot in downtown Halifax" "there was little involvement by Metro Council agencies in the public response and protests".

During the late 1980s and early 1990s the Nova Scotia Black community had a "cultural renaissance" in which "authors, dramatists and artists promoting their cultural expression through community events such as Black History Month". The Metro Council was not involved in this.

== Personal life ==
Oliver married Pearleen Borden Oliver who also a strong advocate for social justice. They had five sons, William P., Philip W. B., Dr. Leslie H., Jules R, and Stephen D.

== See also ==
- Black Nova Scotians
