= Myra Freeman =

Lieutenant governor of Nova Scotia from 2000 to 2006

The Honourable Myra Freeman CM ONS MSM CD

29th Lieutenant Governor of Nova Scotia
- In office May 17, 2000 – September 7, 2006
- Monarch: Elizabeth II
- Governors General: Adrienne Clarkson; Michaëlle Jean
- Premier: John Hamm; Rodney MacDonald
- Preceded by: James Kinley
- Succeeded by: Mayann Francis

Personal details
- Born: Myra Ava Holtzman; May 17, 1949 (age 77) Saint John, New Brunswick, Canada
- Spouse: Larry
- Profession: Teacher

Myra Ava Freeman CM ONS MSM CD (born May 17, 1949) is a Canadian philanthropist and teacher who served as the 29th and first female Lieutenant Governor of Nova Scotia.

== Biography ==
Freeman was born Myra Ava Holtzman in Saint John, New Brunswick, the daughter of Anne Golda (Freedman), a homemaker, and Harry Holtzman, a businessman. She graduated from Dalhousie University with a Bachelor of Arts and a Bachelor of Education. In 1971, she started teaching with the Halifax Regional School Board until her appointment.

She was appointed lieutenant governor in 2000 by Governor General Adrienne Clarkson, on the advice of Jean Chrétien. She served as lieutenant governor until September 7, 2006.

Freeman and her husband, Larry, have three children: Daniel M. Freeman, Jonathan Freeman and Debra Freeman.

In her childhood, Freeman was a member of the Girl Guides of Canada, participating in Guiding youth programs.

== Honours ==

Ribbon	Description	Notes
	Order of Canada (CM)	Member; 1 July 2008.
	Order of St John (D.StJ)	2000.; Dame of Justice and Vice Prior
	Order of Nova Scotia (ONS)	2001.; First Recipient and First Chancellor
	Meritorious Service Medal (MSM)	12 September 2013.; Military Division
	Queen Elizabeth II Golden Jubilee Medal	2002.; Canadian version of this medal
	Canadian Forces' Decoration (CD)	12 years as an Honorary Captain in the Royal Canadian Navy.; 2015.

Honorary degrees

Location	Date	School	Degree
Nova Scotia	2004	Mount Saint Vincent University	Doctor of Humane Letters (DHL)
Nova Scotia	May 2005	Cape Breton University	Doctor of Laws (LL.D)
Nova Scotia	2007	Acadia University	Doctor of Civil Law (DCL)
Nova Scotia	May 2007	Saint Mary's University	Doctor of Civil Law (DCL)
Nova Scotia	2008	St. Francis Xavier University	Doctor of Laws (LL.D)
Nova Scotia	May 2011	Dalhousie University	Doctor of Laws (LL.D)

=== Honorary military appointments ===
- (Canada) 2003 – : Honorary Captain of Royal Canadian Navy Commander of Maritime Forces Atlantic.

== Arms ==
Coat of arms of Myra Freeman
Notes The arms of Myra Freeman consist of: Crest A demi lion Azure semé of ermine spots, wearing a coronet erablé, holding in its dexter paw a laurel wreath and in its sinister paw a balance, all Or. Escutcheon Azure an ancient Hebrew tent between three menorahs Or. Supporters Two lions Or each gorged with a collar of mayflowers (Epigaea repens) proper and maple leaves Vert pendent therefrom a hurt, that on the dexter charged with an open book, that on the sinister charged with a sun in splendour Or. Compartment A grassy mound set to the dexter with palm trees and to the sinister with pine trees proper, the whole above a base wavy Argent charged with a bar wavy Azure. Motto If You Will It * It Is No Dream
