= Calvin Ruck =

Canadian politician (1925–2004)

The Honourable Calvin Ruck CM

Canadian Senator for Nova Scotia
- In office 1998–2000
- Nominated by: Jean Chrétien
- Appointed by: Roméo LeBlanc

Personal details
- Born: Calvin Woodrow Ruck; September 25, 1925 Sydney, Nova Scotia, Canada
- Died: October 19, 2004 (aged 79) Ottawa, Ontario, Canada
- Party: Liberal

Calvin Woodrow Ruck CM (September 4, 1925 – October 19, 2004) was a human rights activist and a member of the Senate of Canada. He was born in Sydney, Nova Scotia; his parents were immigrants to Canada from Barbados.

Ruck's life has been documented in a book entitled Winds of Change: Life and Legacy of Calvin W. Ruck, which was penned by his granddaughter, Lindsay Ruck.

== Associations and activism ==
He held a number of positions within the Nova Scotia Association for the Advancement of Coloured People and was a member for most of his adult life. In the 1950s and 1960s, he organized campaigns against businesses in the Dartmouth area, including barber shops, which refused to serve black people. He worked with the Nova Scotia Human Rights Commission from 1981 to 1986. He campaigned tirelessly for the Canadian Government to recognize the heroics of Jeremiah Jones during the Battle of Vimy Ridge.

== Awards ==
- 1979: Received diploma from the Maritime School of Social Work at Dalhousie University. The School of Social Work now awards a Calvin W. Ruck scholarship yearly.
- 1992: Awarded the Governor General's Commemorative Medal in 1992 for his work in the community.
- 1994: Named to the Order of Canada.

== Political life ==
In 1998, he was appointed to the Senate of Canada by Prime Minister Jean Chrétien, where he served until reaching the mandatory retirement age of 75 in 2000.

He died at his home in Ottawa on October 19, 2004, at the age of 79.

== Books published ==
Ruck published two books about Canada's No. 2 Construction Battalion, the only all-black battalion to serve in World War I:

- Canada's Black Battalion: No. 2 Construction, 1916-1920 (ISBN 0-921201-00-1)
- The Black Battalion : 1916-1920 : Canada's best kept military secret (ISBN 0-920852-92-0)

== See also ==
- Black Nova Scotians
