= Black United Front =

Canadian Black nationalist organization

Black United Front, also known as The Black United Front of Nova Scotia or simply BUF, was a Black nationalist organization primarily based in Halifax, Nova Scotia, during the Civil Rights Movement in the United States. Preceded by the Nova Scotia Association for the Advancement of Coloured People (NSAACP), the BUF organization was founded by William Pearly Oliver and Burnley "Rocky" Jones among others. It was founded in 1965 and loosely based on the 10 point program of the Black Panther Party. In 1968, Stokely Carmichael, popular for coining the phrase Black Power!, visited Nova Scotia helping organize the BUF. The organization remained in operation until 1996.

The Black United Front did a lot to benefit the Black Nova Scotian community. The organization held discussions about employment, housing and educational opportunities. The group also formed its own community police force to keep hard drugs out of Halifax communities, prevent police brutality in communities of colour, and built a park for young children called the Tot-Lot. Additionally, they provided legal aid in the forms of free legal advice and discounted, even sometimes free legal service to the Black community. The Black United Front reportedly "Shook up whites in Canada".

== Notable members ==
- Burnley "Rocky" Jones
- Yvonne Atwell
- Buddy Daye
- Donald D. Skeir

== The Ten Point Program ==
The Ten Point Program was as follows:

1. We want freedom. We want to be able to control the destiny of Black and oppressed communities.
2. We want full employment for our people.
3. We want an end to the robbery by the capitalists, of our black and oppressed communities.
4. We want decent housing, fit for the shelter of human beings.
5. We want decent education for all people and an education that teaches us our true history and role in present society.
6. We want our community to be healthy and for them use to their advantage, the free health care in this nation.
7. We want an immediate end to police brutality and murder of Black people, other people of color, and all oppressed people in this nation.
8. We want an immediate end to all wars.
9. We want adequate rights for all Black and oppressed people held in federal, provincial, county, municipal prisons and jails.
10. We want land, bread, housing, education, clothing, justice and peace.

== Newspapers ==
The Black United Front published a publication called GRASP (standing for Growth, Readiness, Advancement, Self-determination, People) from 1970 until 1976. The Nova Scotia Archives has digitised all issues of this paper and published them online.

The group later published a newspaper called The Rap from 1986 until 1988. This is also available on the provincial archives website.

== See also ==
- Black Panther Party
- Poor Boy's Game
- Speak It! From the Heart of Black Nova Scotia
- Malcolm X
- Black Cultural Centre for Nova Scotia
- Black Nova Scotians
