= Lieutenant Governor of Nova Scotia =

Representative in Nova Scotia of the Canadian monarch

- Emblem of the lieutenant governor

- Flag of the lieutenant governor of Nova Scotia

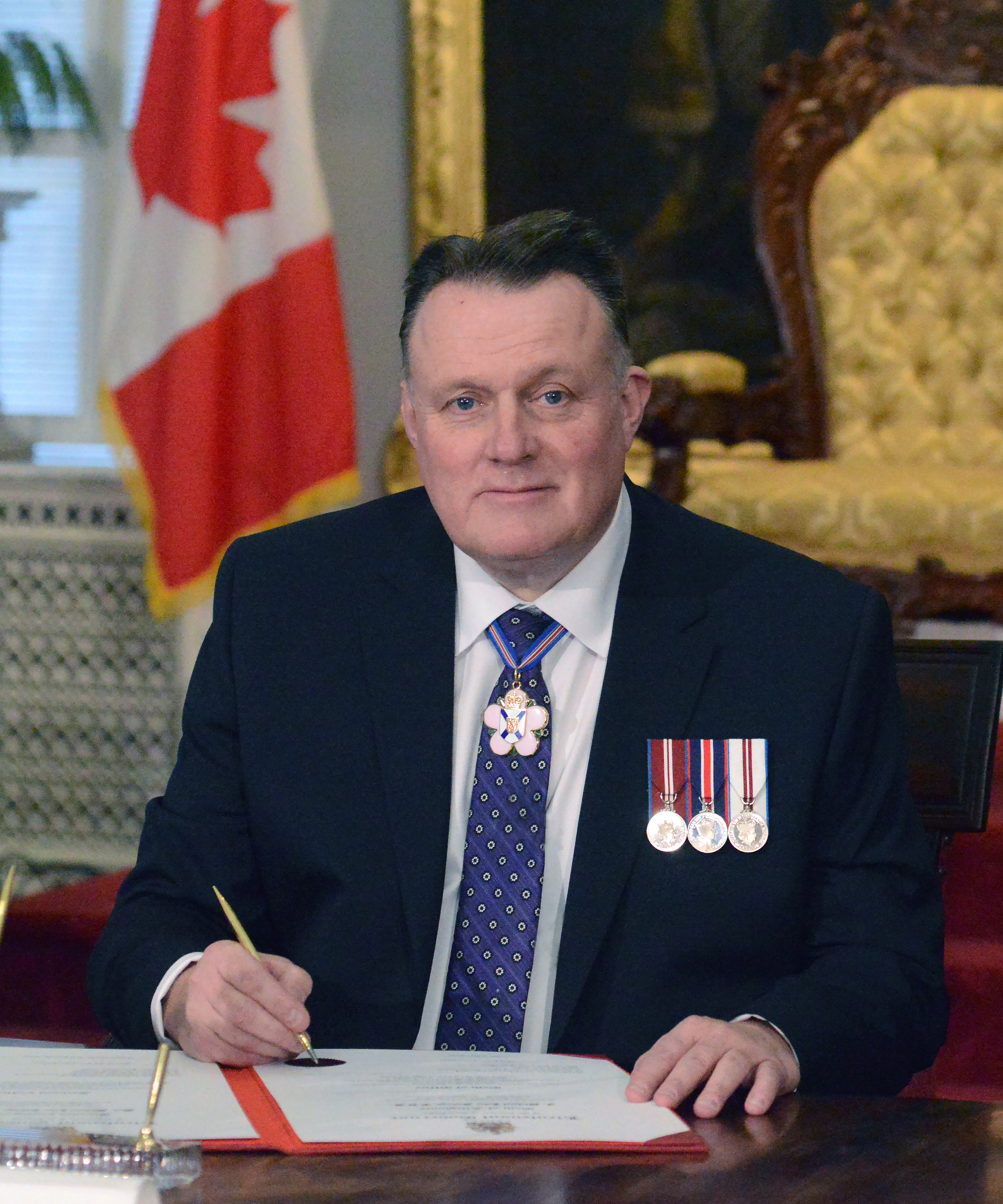
- Incumbent; Mike Savage since 13 December 2024
- Viceroy
- Style: His Honour the Honourable
- Residence: Government House, Halifax
- Appointer: The governor general on the advice of the prime minister
- Term length: At the governor general's pleasure
- Formation: 1 July 1867
- First holder: Sir Charles Hastings Doyle
- Website: lt.gov.ns.ca

The lieutenant governor of Nova Scotia (/lɛfˈtɛnənt/) is the representative in Nova Scotia of the monarch, who operates distinctly within the province but is also shared equally with the ten other jurisdictions of Canada. The lieutenant governor of Nova Scotia is appointed in the same manner as the other provincial viceroys in Canada and is similarly tasked with carrying out most of the monarch's constitutional and ceremonial duties. The 34th and current lieutenant governor of Nova Scotia is Mike Savage, who has served in the role since 13 December 2024.

== Role and presence ==
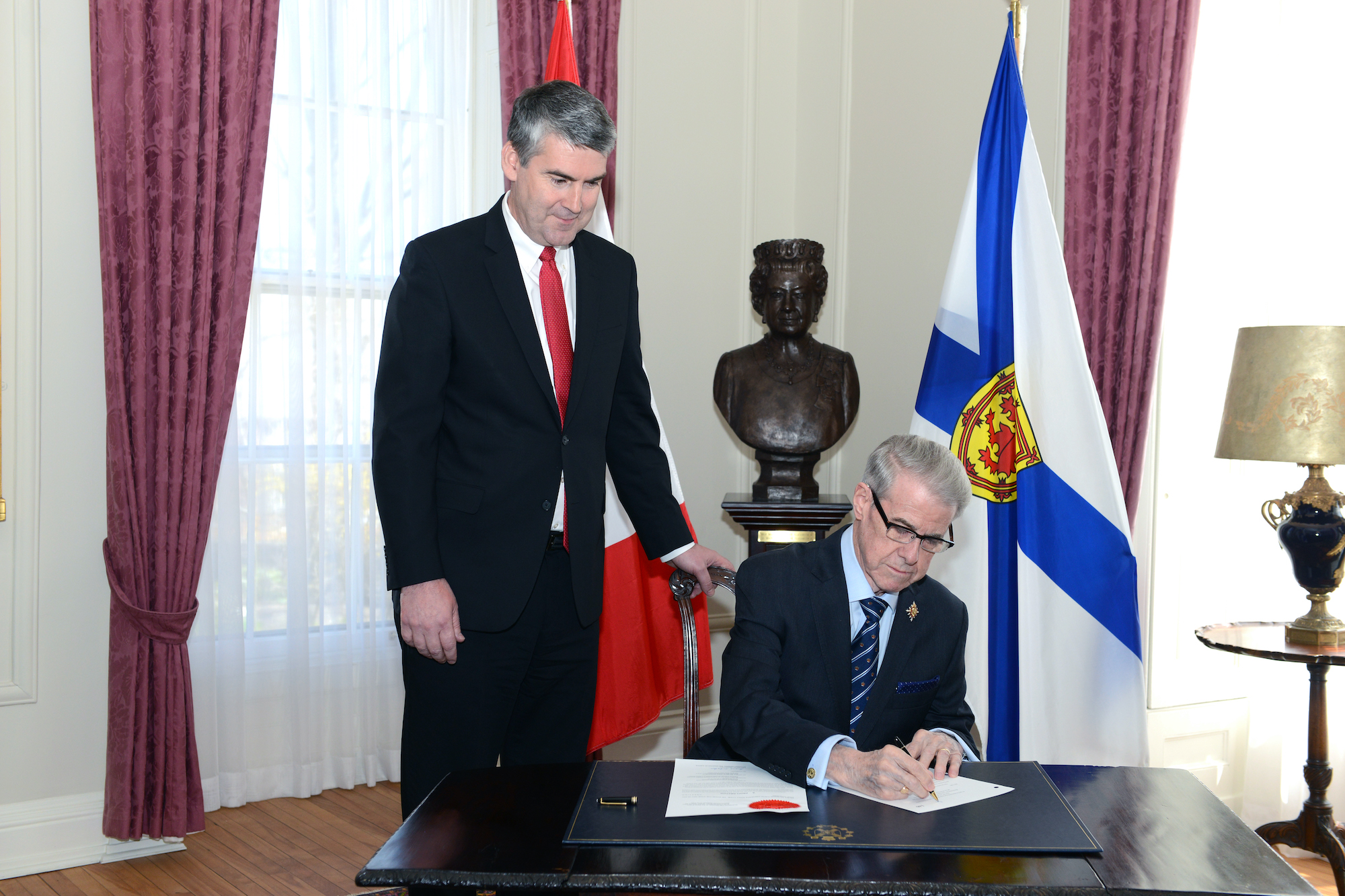
Lieutenant Governor of Nova Scotia, Brigadier-General the Honourable J.J. Grant, signing the Order in Council dissolving the Provincial House of Assembly and calling a provincial general election, 30 April 2017

The lieutenant governor of Nova Scotia is vested with a number of governmental duties and is also expected to undertake various ceremonial roles. For instance, the lieutenant governor acts as patron, honorary president, or an honorary member of certain Nova Scotia institutions, such as the Multicultural Association of Nova Scotia, the Nova Scotia Salmon Association, and the Royal Canadian Legion (Nova Scotia–Nunavut Command). Also, the viceroy, him or herself a member and Chancellor of the order, will induct deserving individuals into the Order of Nova Scotia and, upon installation, automatically becomes a Knight or Dame of Justice and the Vice-Prior in Nova Scotia of the Most Venerable Order of the Hospital of Saint John of Jerusalem. The viceroy further presents numerous other provincial honours and decorations, as well as various awards that are named for and presented by the lieutenant governor; these are generally created in partnership with another government or charitable organization and linked specifically to their cause. These honours are presented at official ceremonies, which count amongst hundreds of other engagements the lieutenant governor partakes in each year, either as host or guest of honour; the lieutenant governor in 2006 undertook 289 engagements and 384 in 2007.

At these events, the lieutenant governor's presence is marked by the lieutenant governor's standard, consisting of a blue field bearing the escutcheon of the Arms of His Majesty in Right of Nova Scotia surmounted by a crown and surrounded by ten gold maple leaves, symbolizing the ten provinces of Canada. Prior to 2024, the lieutenant governor used a flag consisting of the Royal Union Flag defaced with the escutcheon of the arms surrounded by a circle of 18 green maple leaves. This was the last of the Canadian governors' flags to retain the original design set out by Queen Victoria in 1869, though for a period in the 1950s, the lieutenant governor used a flag bearing simply the arms of the province. Within Nova Scotia, the lieutenant governor also follows only the sovereign in the province's order of precedence, preceding even other members of the Canadian Royal Family and the King's federal representative.

The aides-de-camp who serve the lieutenant governor wear on their uniforms a badge consisting of the Royal Union Flag in shield form defaced by the arms of Nova Scotia within a wreath of maple leaves, all surmounted by St Edward's Crown. The Canadian Heraldic Authority designed the badge, with the authorization on 20 May 2011 of Governor General David Johnston, as well as of Queen Elizabeth II for the use of the royal crown.

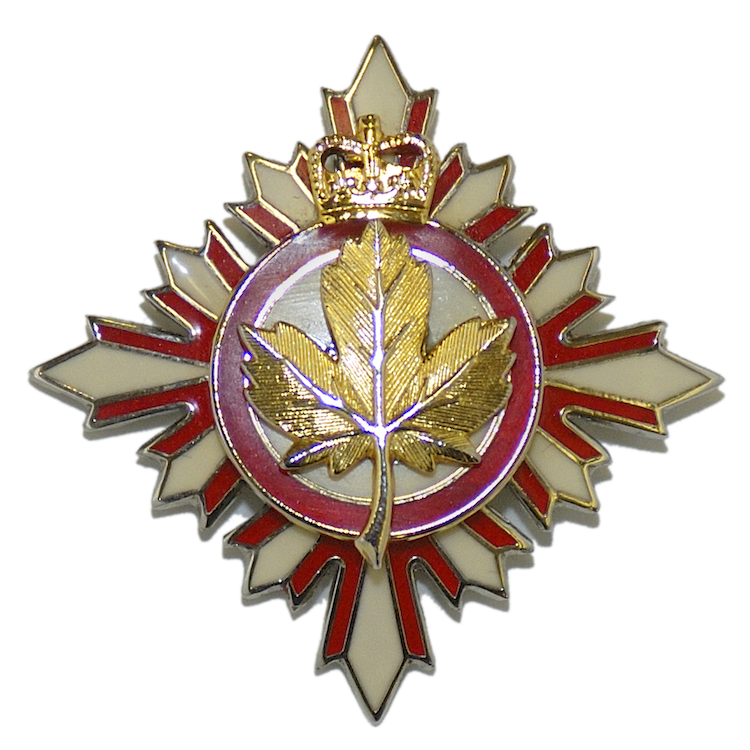
Lieutenant Governor's Recognition Badge

== History ==
Standard of the lieutenant governor of Nova Scotia from 1870 to 1929

Standard of the lieutenant governor of Nova Scotia from 1929 to 2024

The office of lieutenant governor of Nova Scotia came into being in 1786, when the government of William Pitt adopted the idea that Nova Scotia, along with New Brunswick, Quebec, and Prince Edward Island, should have as their respective governors a single individual. The earlier post of governor of Nova Scotia thus came to be occupied by the overreaching authority of the governor-in-chief, who was represented in the colony by a lieutenant. The modern incarnation of the office was established in 1867, upon Nova Scotia's entry into Confederation. Since that date, 34 lieutenant governors have served the province among whom were notable firsts, such as Myra Freeman, the first female lieutenant governor of the province, and Mayann Francis, the first lieutenant governor of Black Nova Scotian ancestry. The shortest mandate by a Lieutenant Governor of Nova Scotia was Joseph Howe, for three weeks in July 1873, and the longest was Malachy Bowes Daly, from 1890 to 1900.

== See also ==
- List of lieutenant governors of Nova Scotia
- Premier of Nova Scotia
- Christopher McCreery – Private Secretary to the Lieutenant Governor
