= Black Cultural Centre for Nova Scotia =

Canadian museum and cultural centre

Coordinates: 44.70316°N 63.47189°W

- Established: 1983
- Location: Cherry Brook, Nova Scotia, Canada
- Type: Heritage centre
- Website: www.bccns.com

The Black Cultural Centre for Nova Scotia (also known as The Society for the Protection and Preservation of Black Culture in Nova Scotia) is located in Cherry Brook, Nova Scotia, in the Halifax Regional Municipality. The centre is a museum and a library resource centre that focuses on the history and culture of African Nova Scotians. The organization of the Black Cultural Society was incorporated as a charitable organization in 1977 and the centre opened in 1983, with a goal to "educate and inspire" and to protect, preserve and promote Black culture in Nova Scotia. The centre is located on Trunk 7 at 1149 Main Street.

The centre holds many events on a weekly basis and is open to the public. The centre also has a permanent display about the former community of Africville.

== Background ==
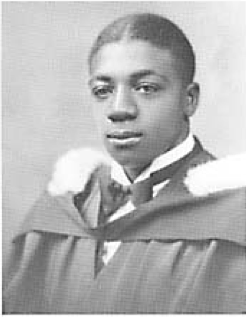

The Black Cultural Centre was the "brainchild" of William Pearly Oliver OC CM (1934 – 1989), and was put forth in 1972 in order to help meet the needs of the local Black community. Its goals include the preservation and bolstering of the culture of Nova Scotians of African descent through exhibitions and lectures about "community life, religion, military service and immigration."

By 2007, the Cultural Centre had been successful in acquiring an Order of Canada medal and thirty Victory Medals from eBay. The Victory Medals had been originally awarded to Black soldiers who had served during World War I in the No. 2 Construction Battalion—"Canada's first and only black battalion." The Centre worked with Dave Thomson of St. George, Ontario who had helped purchase medals for the Centre. In February 2007, the family of Sapper PR. P.F. Fenton learned that his medal was being auctioned on eBay. The community raised thousands of dollars towards the purchase price of over CDN$7,400 so the medal could be placed at the Centre.

== Public transit ==
There is a Halifax Transit bus stop outside the Black Cultural Centre served by routes "61 North Preston" and "68 Cherry Brook". These operate all day and connect to nearby Portland Hills Terminal.

== See also ==
- Africville Museum
- Black Loyalist Heritage Centre
