= Nova Scotia Home for Colored Children =

Orphanage in Westphal, Nova Scotia

The Nova Scotia Home for Colored Children is an orphanage in Halifax, Nova Scotia that opened on June 6, 1921. It was built, because at the time, white home care institutions would not accept black children in need. In the 1960s segregation was coming to an end, and black people were being integrated into white institutions. In the present day, the building is used as a meeting place for community groups. The home came under fire when many former residents came forward with allegations of abuse they experienced during their time at the home, which ended in a class action lawsuit, an apology from the Premier of Nova Scotia and the establishment of an official Public Inquiry into the abuses at the Home. The public inquiry, established under the Nova Scotia Public Inquiries Act was the first of its kind to take a restorative approach to its work. The Restorative Inquiry for the Nova Scotia Home for Colored Children completed its work and released it final report "Journey to Light: A Different Way Forward - Final Report of the Restorative Inquiry - Nova Scotia Home for Colored Children" (including 5 videos) in November 2019.

== History ==
The home opened in Halifax, Nova Scotia on June 6, 1921, to accept black children in need of care who, at the time, were not permitted in white institutions. A crowd of 3000 spectators, the largest gathering of black Nova Scotians since 1783, celebrated the opening of the home. During the end of segregation and into the 1970s the home became an institution for children of all races and ethnic backgrounds. The home came under fire when many former residents reported physical and sexual abuse they suffered during their time at the home. On October 10, 2014, the premier of Nova Scotia, Stephen McNeil, gave an apology to those who suffered due to the Nova Scotia Home for Colored Children. A class action lawsuit with the province of Nova Scotia was settled in July 2014, which awarded approximately 300 former residents $29 million on top of $5 million settled in the summer of 2013 with the Nova Scotia Home for Colored Children. The former schoolhouse is now used as a meeting place for local community groups.

The Restorative Inquiry Report provided the first accurate history of the Home contained in Chapter 3 of the Final Report. It collected relevant evidence and documentation that is now available at the Nova Scotia Provincial Archives.

In 2006, author, teacher, artist and community activist Delvina Bernard, whose father had grown up in the home, contributed a piece of wood from the building to the Six String Nation project. Parts of that material are used as a finger brace and a reinforcing strip on the interior of Voyageur, the guitar at the heart of the project.

== Apology ==
An official apology was made in the provincial legislature to the former residents and community leaders of the Nova Scotia Home for Colored Children. Premier Stephen McNeill apologised for the mistreatment, mental, psychological and sexual abuse inflicted on the orphans by staff members for almost a 50-year period. This abuse was discontinued in the 1980s. McNeil noted that this was one of the most horrific events that took place in the province and the cries of the people fell on deaf ears for so long. McNeil also noted that he is thankful to the former residents for their courage and ability to share their stories and bring awareness and inspiration to other African Nova Scotia communities, and all Nova Scotians.
