= Order of Nova Scotia =

Civilian honour for merit in Canada

- Insignia of the Order of Nova Scotia

Awarded by the lieutenant governor of Nova Scotia
- Type: Order of merit (provincial)
- Founded: 1 June 2001
- Status: Currently constituted
- Founder: Myra Freeman
- Chancellor: Mike Savage
- Grades: Member
- Post-nominals: ONS

Statistics
- Total inductees: 132

Precedence
- Next (higher): Order of New Brunswick
- Next (lower): Order of Newfoundland and Labrador
- Ribbon bar of the order

The Order of Nova Scotia (Note: French: Ordre de la Nouvelle-Écosse) is a civilian honour for merit in the Canadian province of Nova Scotia. The order was instituted through the Order of Nova Scotia Act on 1 June 2001, with the first appointments beginning in 2002. The order is intended to honour current or former Nova Scotia residents who have demonstrated a high level of individual excellence and achievement, thus being described as the highest honour amongst all those conferred by the Nova Scotia Crown. The lieutenant governor is Chancellor of the order, and is responsible for inducting new members.

== History ==
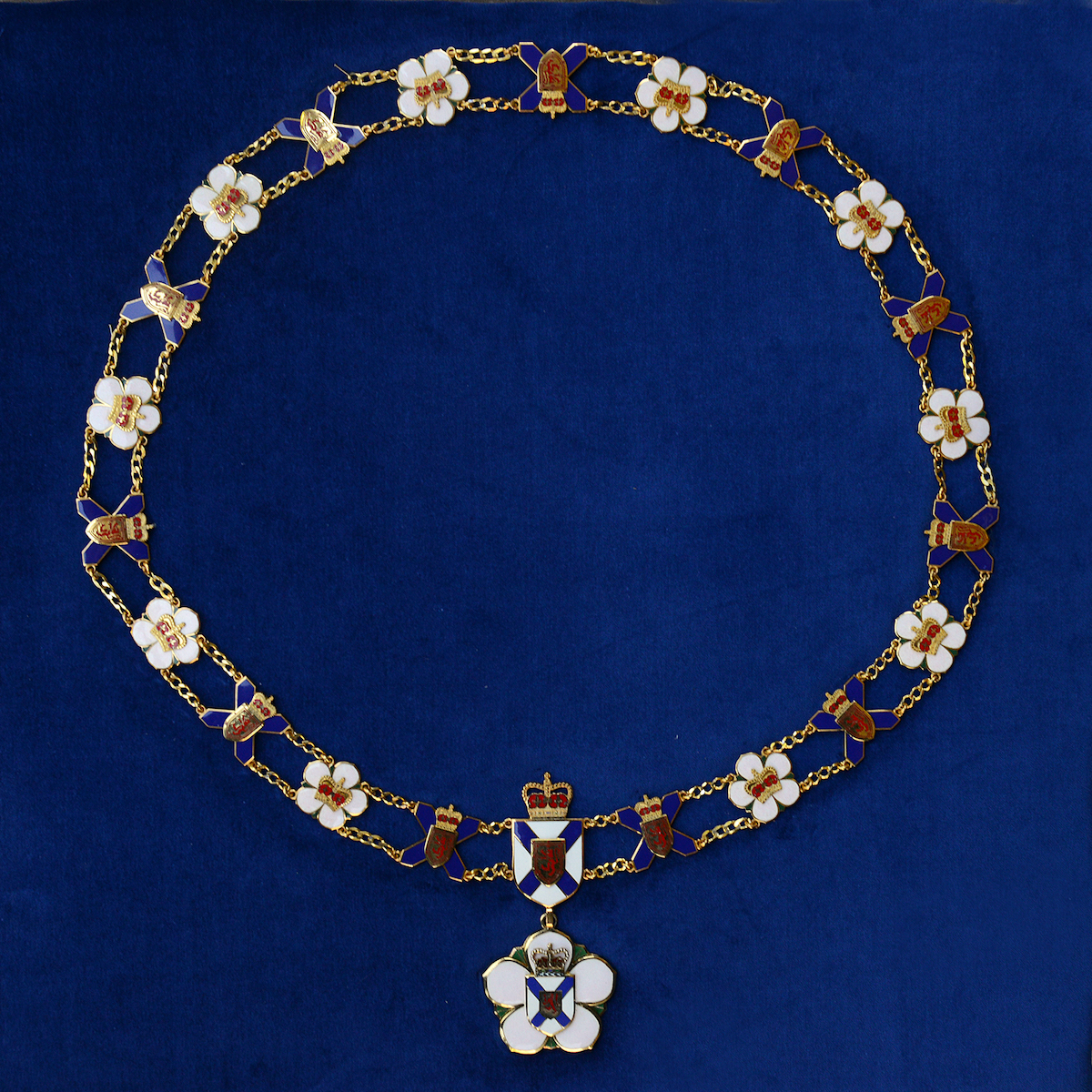
Chancellor's Chain of the Order of Nova Scotia

Provincial orders began to be implemented following the establishment of the Canadian honours system in 1967. Quebec was the first province to seek formal recognition of its order, requesting its inclusion in the order of precedence in 1984. On 9 May 1991, all provincial orders that had been created thus far were recognized by the federal government via Order-in-Council 1991-841. Every province and territory would thereafter come to create their own order.

The Order of Nova Scotia was implemented through the Order of Nova Scotia Act, which was granted royal assent on 1 June 2001. The province first called for nominations on 21 November 2001, but only two nominations had been received by early January 2002. In spite of the initial lacklustre response, the province remained optimistic and expected to receive more nominations before the deadline of 21 March 2002. A total of 10 civilian appointments were made to the order in 2002, ultimately chosen from a pool of 200 nominations. The three surviving prior lieutenant governors: Alan Abraham, Lloyd Crouse, and James Kinley, were also appointed to the order in accordance with the Order of Nova Scotia Act. Lieutenant Governor Myra Freeman was appointed to the order ex officio.

== Eligibility and appointment ==
The Order of Nova Scotia is intended to honour any current or former long-term resident of Nova Scotia who has demonstrated a high level of individual excellence and achievement, having "distinguished themselves by an outstanding contribution to the cultural life or to the social or economic well-being of the Province". The order is thus described as the highest honour amongst all those conferred by the Nova Scotia Crown. There are no limits on how many people can belong to the order, though inductions are limited to six per year. (Note: The Order of Nova Scotia was initially limited to five inductions per year, and allowed for 10 inductions in its first year. In 2007, the Order of Nova Scotia Act was amended to include a youth category, in which a sixth candidate may be appointed provided they are at least 16 years old and under the age of 25.) Canadian citizenship is a requirement, and individuals currently serving as elected or appointed members of a governmental body are ineligible.

The process of finding qualified individuals begins with submissions from the public to the Order of Nova Scotia Advisory Council. The council consists of the chair, appointed by the premier; the Chief Justice of the Nova Scotia Court of Appeal; the clerk of the executive council; three people appointed by the premier, including the president of a university in the province, and a member of the Order of Nova Scotia; one person appointed by the leader of the opposition; and one person appointed by each of the leaders of the political parties in the House of Assembly, all of whom must reside in Nova Scotia. Under the Order of Nova Scotia Act, the committee is required to meet at least annually to make its recommendations to executive council, narrowing down potential appointees to a list submitted to the lieutenant governor. (Note: The Lieutenant Governor of Nova Scotia is ex officio a member and Chancellor of the Order of Nova Scotia. This applies to all other provincial orders except the National Order of Quebec, which has no Chancellor.) Posthumous nominations are accepted up to one year following the nominee's death. The lieutenant governor then makes all appointments into the order's single grade of membership. New members are thereafter entitled to use the post-nominal letters ONS.

== Insignia ==
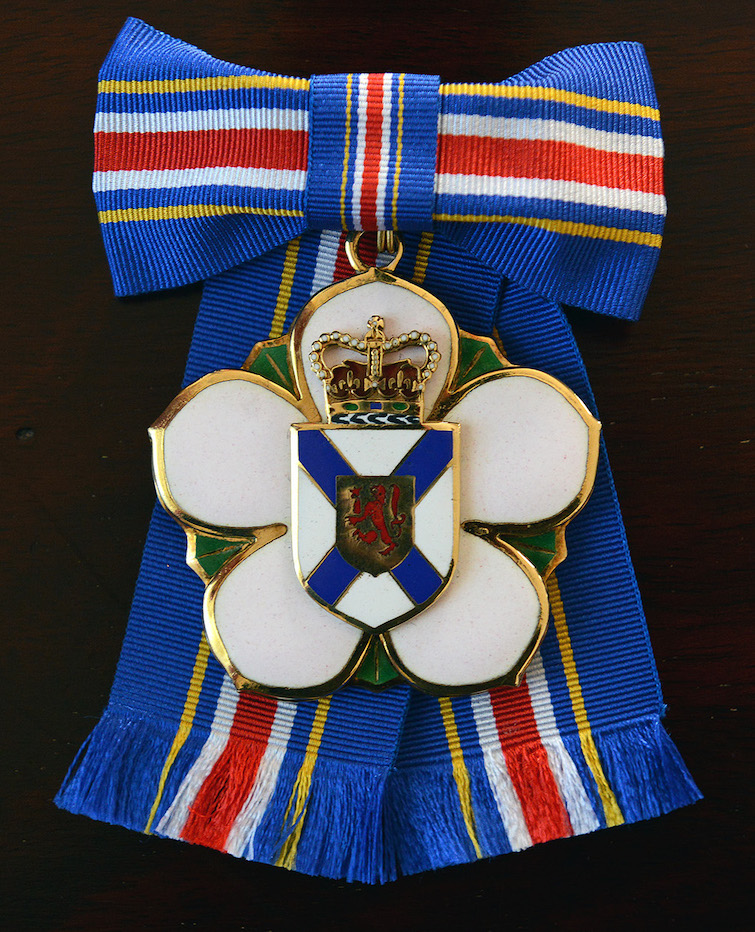
Insignia of the Order of Nova Scotia on a bow

Upon admission into the Order of Nova Scotia, the lieutenant governor presents the order's insignia to the recipient in a formal ceremony, in the name of the Crown. The insignia, designed by Christopher Cairns, consists of a 61 mm (2.4 in) badge in the shape of a mayflower, the provincial flower. The obverse of the badge is enamelled in white, and bears the escutcheon of the arms of Nova Scotia, all surmounted by St Edward's Crown. The reverse of the badge features a three-digit number. The 32 mm (1.3 in) ribbon is patterned with vertical stripes in red, blue, gold, and white; the badge is attached to the ribbon via a 21 mm (0.83 in) gold loop. Members of the order also receive a lapel pin featuring a miniature version of the insignia. The insignia of the order is worn around the neck, or may be worn on a bow by women.

== See also ==
- Canadian honours order of wearing
- Orders, decorations, and medals of the Canadian provinces
- Symbols of Nova Scotia
