= Black Nova Scotians =

Black Canadians in Nova Scotia

- Flag of Black Nova Scotians, designed by Wendie Wilson and first unveiled in 2021

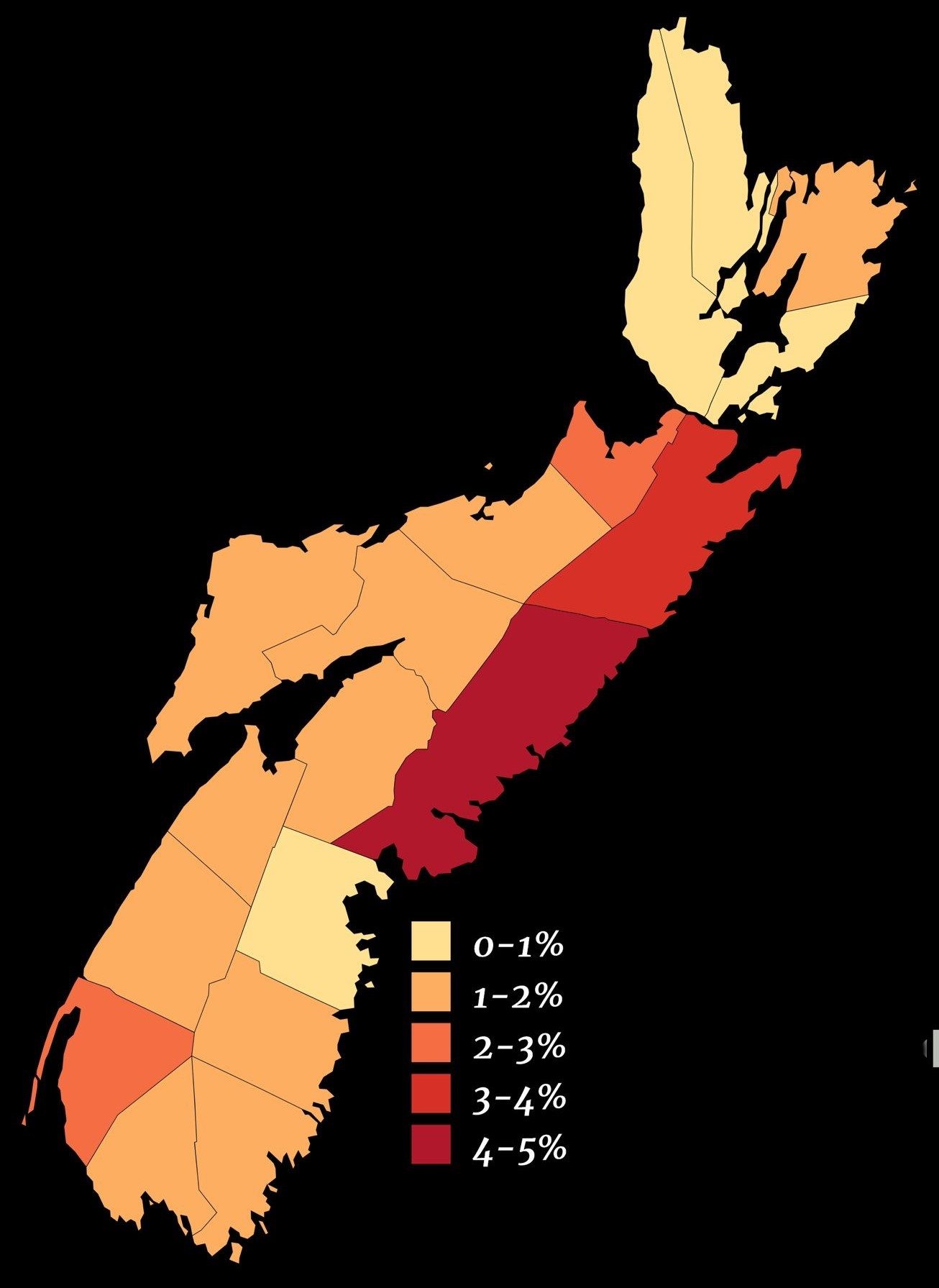
- Population distribution of Black Canadians in Nova Scotia by census division, 2021 census

Total population
- 28,220; 3% of Nova Scotia population (2021)

Languages
- African Nova Scotian English, Canadian English, Canadian French

Religion
- Christianity (Baptist), Irreligion and others

Related ethnic groups
- African Americans, Black Canadians, Merikins, Sierra Leone Creoles, Afro-Caribbeans, Americo-Liberians

Black Nova Scotians (also known as African Nova Scotians, Afro-Nova Scotians, and Africadians) are Black Canadians whose ancestors primarily date back to the Colonial United States as slaves or freemen, later arriving in Nova Scotia, Canada, during the 18th and early 19th centuries. As of the 2021 Census of Canada, 28,220 Black people live in Nova Scotia, most in Halifax. Since the 1950s, numerous Black Nova Scotians have migrated to Toronto for its larger range of opportunities. The first recorded free African person in Nova Scotia, Mathieu da Costa, a Mikmaq interpreter, was recorded among the founders of Port Royal in 1604. West Africans escaped slavery by coming to Nova Scotia in early British and French colonies in the 17th and 18th centuries. Many came as enslaved people, primarily from the French West Indies to Nova Scotia during the founding of Louisbourg. The second major migration of people to Nova Scotia happened following the American Revolution, when the British evacuated thousands of slaves who had fled to their lines during the war. They were given freedom by the Crown if they joined British lines, and some 3,000 African Americans were resettled in Nova Scotia after the war, where they were known as Black Loyalists. There was also the forced migration of the Jamaican Maroons in 1796, although the British supported the desire of a third of the Loyalists and nearly all of the Maroons to establish Freetown in Sierra Leone four years later, where they formed the Sierra Leone Creole ethnic identity.

In this period, British missionaries began to develop educational opportunities for Black Nova Scotians through the Society for the Propagation of the Gospel in Foreign Parts (Bray Schools). The decline of slavery in Nova Scotia happened in large part by local judicial decisions in keeping with those by the British courts of the late 18th century.

The next major migration happened during the War of 1812, with the Black refugees—African Americans from the Chesapeake escaping slavery in the United States. Many came after having gained passage and freedom on British ships. A 1948 documentary study prepared for the Public Archives of Nova Scotia stated that the Black refugees brought into the province during and immediately after the War of 1812 were destined to become the progenitors of the majority of Black people in Nova Scotia. The British issued a proclamation in the South promising freedom and land to those who wanted to join them. Nova Scotia Archives notes that Africville was settled in about the 1840s by people from the Black refugee communities of Hammonds Plains and Preston, and that William Brown Sr. and William Arnold purchased the land in 1848; later provincial correspondence (1962) stated that officials did not find William Brown to be a grantee and did not know of any records of land being granted in Africville. This has been cited as an example of early Black landownership and community formation in the Halifax area through purchase rather than government land grants. Founded in 1848, Africville has been described as the first and only community in Nova Scotia formed by Black land purchase.

Creation of institutions such as the Royal Acadian School and the African Baptist Church in Halifax, founded in 1832, opened opportunities for Black Canadians. During the years before the American Civil War, an estimated ten to thirty thousand African Americans migrated to Canada, mostly as individual or small family groups; many settled in Ontario. A number of Black Nova Scotians also have some Indigenous heritage, due to historical intermarriage between Black and First Nations communities.

In the 20th century, Black Nova Scotians organized for civil rights, establishing such groups as the Nova Scotia Association for the Advancement of Coloured People, the Nova Scotia Human Rights Commission, the Black United Front, and the Black Cultural Centre for Nova Scotia. In the 21st century, the government and grassroots groups have initiated actions in Nova Scotia to address past harm done to Black Nova Scotians, such as the Africville Apology, the Viola Desmond Pardon, the restorative justice initiative for the Nova Scotia Home for Colored Children, and most recently the official apology to the No. 2 Construction Battalion.

== Demographics ==
Main denominations of African Nova Scotians Christians
1. Baptist (40.2%)
2. Catholic (18.4%)
3. Anglican (6.90%)
4. Christian (not stated) (19.3%)
5. Pentecostal (3.50%)
6. United Church (3.26%)
7. Other (8.44%)

According to the 2021 Census, 59.1% of African Nova Scotians are Christian, especially Baptist, and 38.1% are irreligious. 86.4% of African Nova Scotians are born to Canadian-born parents and 12% of them are born to at-least one immigrant parent.

=== Settlements ===
Black Nova Scotians were initially established in rural settings, which usually functioned independently until the 1960s. Black Nova Scotians in urban areas today still trace their roots to these rural settlements. Some of the settlements include: Gibson Woods, Greenville, Weymouth Falls, Birchtown, East Preston, Cherry Brook, Lincolnville, Upper Big Tracadie, Five Mile Plains, North Preston, Tracadie, Shelburne, Lucasville, Beechville, and Hammonds Plains among others. Some have roots in other Black settlements located in New Brunswick and Prince Edward Island including Elm Hill, New Brunswick, Willow Grove (Saint John, NB) and The Bog (Charlottetown, PEI).

Prominent Black neighbourhoods exist in most towns and cities in Nova Scotia including Halifax, Truro, New Glasgow, Sydney, Digby, Shelburne and Yarmouth. Black neighbourhoods in Halifax include Uniacke Square and Mulgrave Park. The ethnically diverse Whitney Pier neighbourhood of Sydney has a significant Black population, first drawn there by the opening of the Dominion Iron and Steel Company steel mill in the early 20th century.

==== List of areas with Black populations higher than provincial average ====
Over 100,000
- Halifax (central part of the Halifax Regional Municipality) (3.8%)

Over 10,000

- Dartmouth North (9.7%)
- Whitney Pier (7.7%)
- Clayton Park (7.5%)
- Spryfield (7.2%)
- Cole Harbour (7%)
- Dartmouth (6.5%)
- Rockingham (5%)
- Truro (3.9%)
- West Hants County (2.4%)

Over 5,000

- Preston (23%) including Cherry Brook & Lake Loon
- North End Halifax (21%)
- West End Halifax (8.3%)
- Yarmouth (7.8%)
- Lake Echo (6.1%)
- Digby (municipal district) (4.5%)
- Amherst (3.9%)
- New Glasgow (3.9%)
- New Minas (3.8%)

Over 1,000

- North Preston (99%)
- East Preston (80%)
- Upper Hammonds Plains (17.9%)
- South End (New Glasgow) (17%)
- Three Mile Plains & Five Mile Plains (15.5%)
- Shelburne (town) (13.8%)
- Acaciaville, Jordantown & Marshalltown (11.1%)
- Weymouth & Weymouth Falls area (9.2%)
- Beechville (9.5%)
- Digby (town) (8.4%)
- Lucasville (7.8%)
- Guysborough (7.6%)
- Lower Truro (6.3%)
- Liverpool (3%)

== History ==
Black Nova Scotians by share of overall Black Canadian population:

Year	Number of Black Canadians	Number of Black Nova Scotians	Percent of all Black Canadians living in Nova Scotia
1881	21,394	7,062	33%
1951	18,020	8,141	45%
2016	1,198,545	21,910	2%

=== 17th century ===
==== Port Royal ====
The first recorded Black person in Canada was Mathieu da Costa. He arrived in Nova Scotia sometime between 1605 and 1608 as a translator for the French explorer Pierre Dugua, Sieur de Monts. The first known Black person to live in Canada was an enslaved person from Madagascar named Olivier Le Jeune (who may have been of partial Malay ancestry).

=== 18th century ===
==== Louisbourg ====
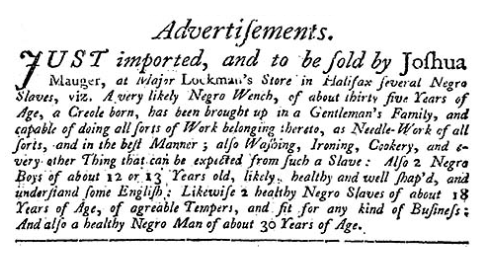
Advertisement for Slaves, Halifax Gazette, May 30, 1752, p. 2

Of the 10,000 French living at Louisbourg (1713–1760) and on the rest of Ile Royale, 216 were African-descended slaves. According to historian Kenneth Donovan, slaves on Ile Royal worked as "servants, gardeners, bakers, tavern keepers, stone masons, musicians, laundry workers, soldiers, sailors, fishermen, hospital workers, ferry men, executioners and nursemaids." More than 90 per cent of the enslaved people were from the French West Indies, which included Saint-Domingue, the chief sugar colony, and Guadeloupe.

==== Halifax ====
Among the founders recorded for Halifax, were 17 free Black people. By 1767, there were 54 Black people living in Halifax. When Halifax, Nova Scotia, was established (1749), some British people brought slaves to the city. For example, shipowner and trader Joshua Mauger sold enslaved people at auction there. A few newspaper advertisements were published for runaway slaves.

The first Black community in Halifax was on Albemarle Street, which later became the site of the first school for Black students in Nova Scotia (1786). The school for Black students was the only charitable school in Halifax for the next 26 years. Whites were not allowed to attend.

Prior to 1799, 29 recorded Black people were buried in the Old Burying Ground; 12 of them were listed with both first and last names, seven of the graves are from the New England Planter migration (1763–1775), and 22 graves are from immediately following the arrival of the Black Loyalists in 1776. Rev. John Breynton reported that in 1783, he baptized 40 Black people and buried many because of disease.

According to a 1783 report, 73 Black people arrived in Halifax from New York. Of the 4007 Black people who came to Nova Scotia in 1783 as part of promised resettlement by the Crown, 69% (2775) were free, 35% (1423) were former British soldiers, and 31% (1232) were slaves of white Loyalists. While 41 former slaves were sent to Dartmouth, none were sent to Halifax. 550 Jamaican Maroons lived in Halifax for four years (1796–1800); they were resettled in Freetown (now Sierra Leone). A return in December 1816 indicates there were 155 Black people who migrated to Halifax during the War of 1812.

==== American Revolution ====
The British had promised enslaved people of rebels freedom if they joined their forces (See Dunmore's Proclamation and Philipsburg Proclamation). Approximately three thousand Black Loyalists were evacuated by ship to Nova Scotia between April and November 1783, traveling on Navy vessels or British chartered private transports. This group was made up largely of tradespeople and labourers. Many of these African Americans had roots in the American states of Virginia, South Carolina, Georgia and Maryland. Some came from Massachusetts, New Jersey and New York as well. Many of these African-American settlers were recorded in the Book of Negroes.

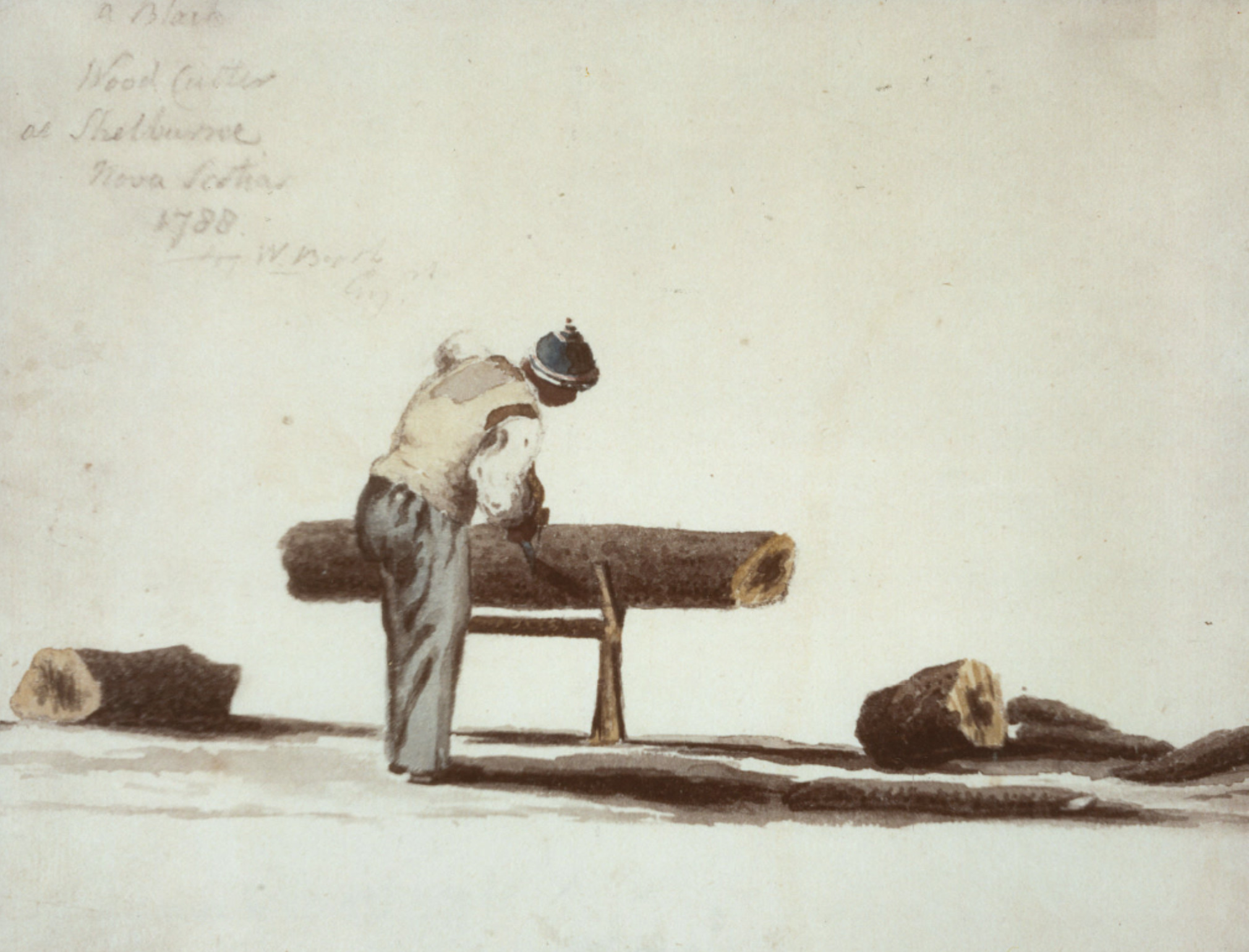
1788 illustration of a Black woodcutter in Shelburne, Nova Scotia

In 1785 in Halifax, educational opportunities began to develop with the establishment of Society for the Propagation of the Gospel in Foreign Parts (Bray Schools). In Halifax, for example, the first teacher was a "capable and serious Negroe woman". Initially, the school was in the Orphan House and had 36 Black children, six of whom were enslaved. She was followed by Reverend William Furmage (d. 1793), Huntingdonian Missionary who was buried in the Old Burying Ground (Halifax, Nova Scotia). After a year he was followed by Isaac Limerick. Limerick moved the school and went into debt to maintain it. The next teacher was a white woman, Mrs. Deborah Clarke (1793–1809), followed by Mary Fitzgerald. The school was dissolved in 1814 (when the Royal Acadian School was established for Black and white people). The next teacher was Daniel Gallagher, who held the position of schoolmaster for a long period. The school was in the Black community on Albemarle Street, where it served the people for decades under the son of Rev. Charles Inglis.

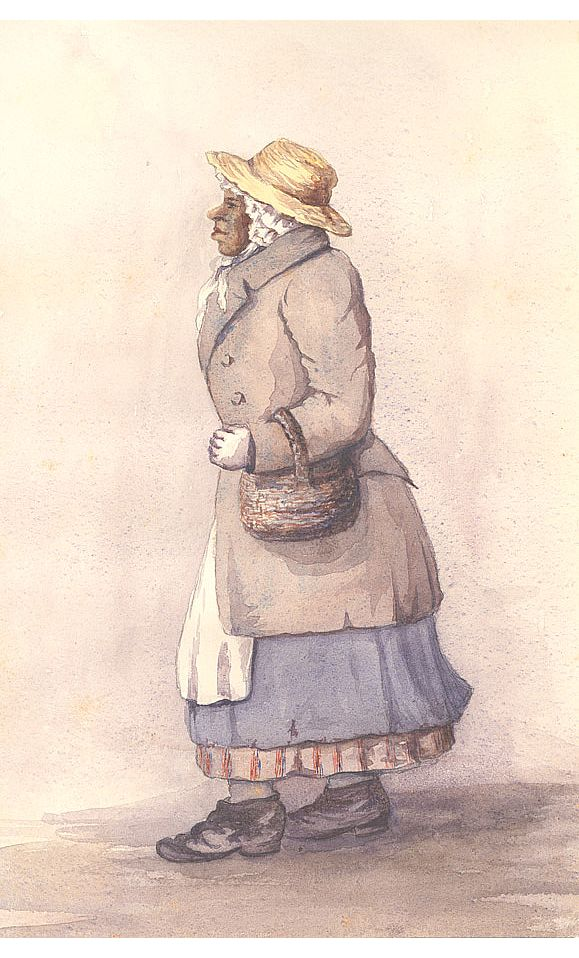
Rose Fortune, Black Loyalist – Annapolis Royal c. 1830

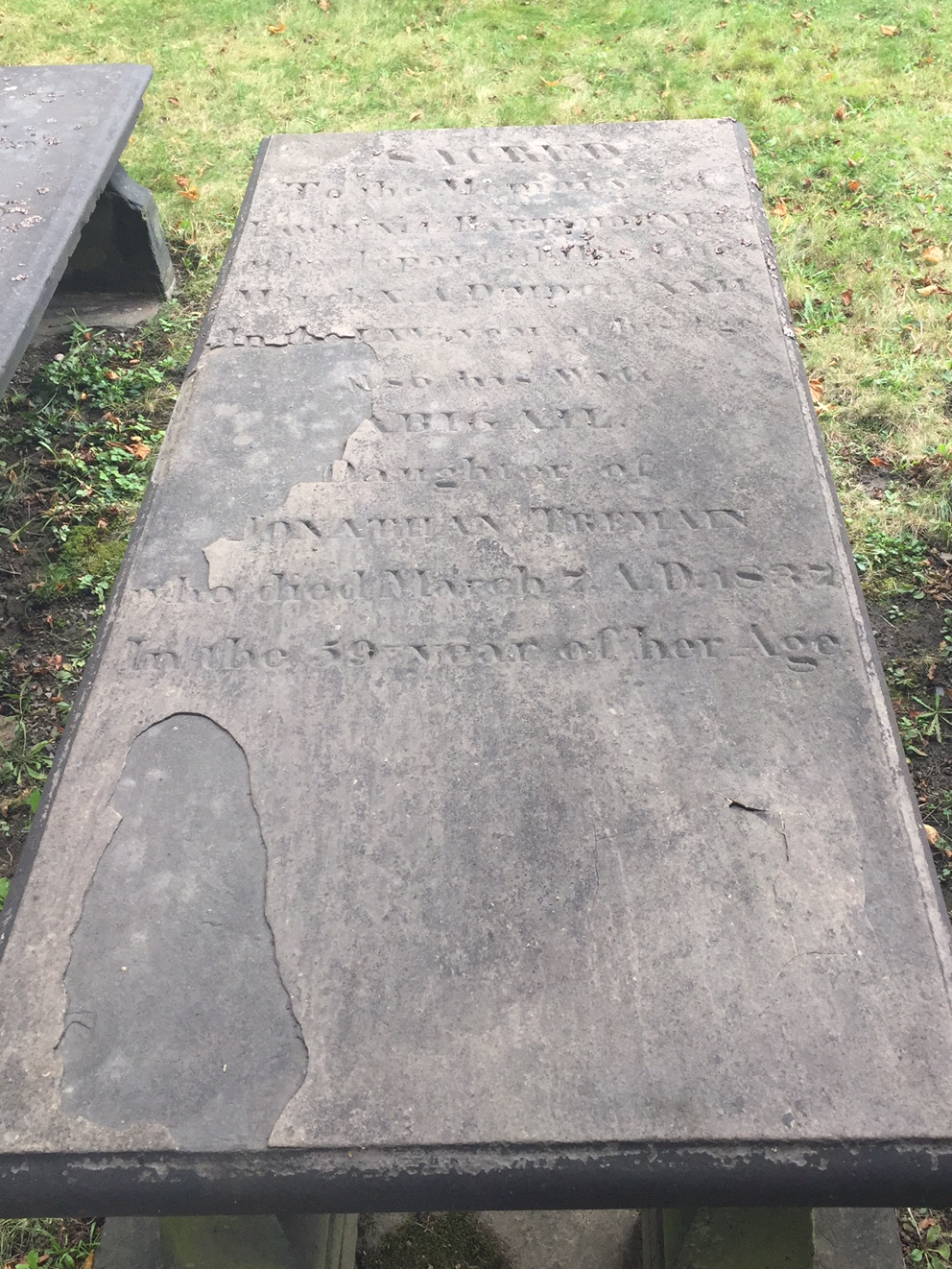
Lawrence Hartshorne, d. 1822, a Quaker who was the chief assistant of John Clarkson in helping the Black Nova Scotian Settlers emigrate to Sierra Leone (1792) – Old Burying Ground (Halifax, Nova Scotia)

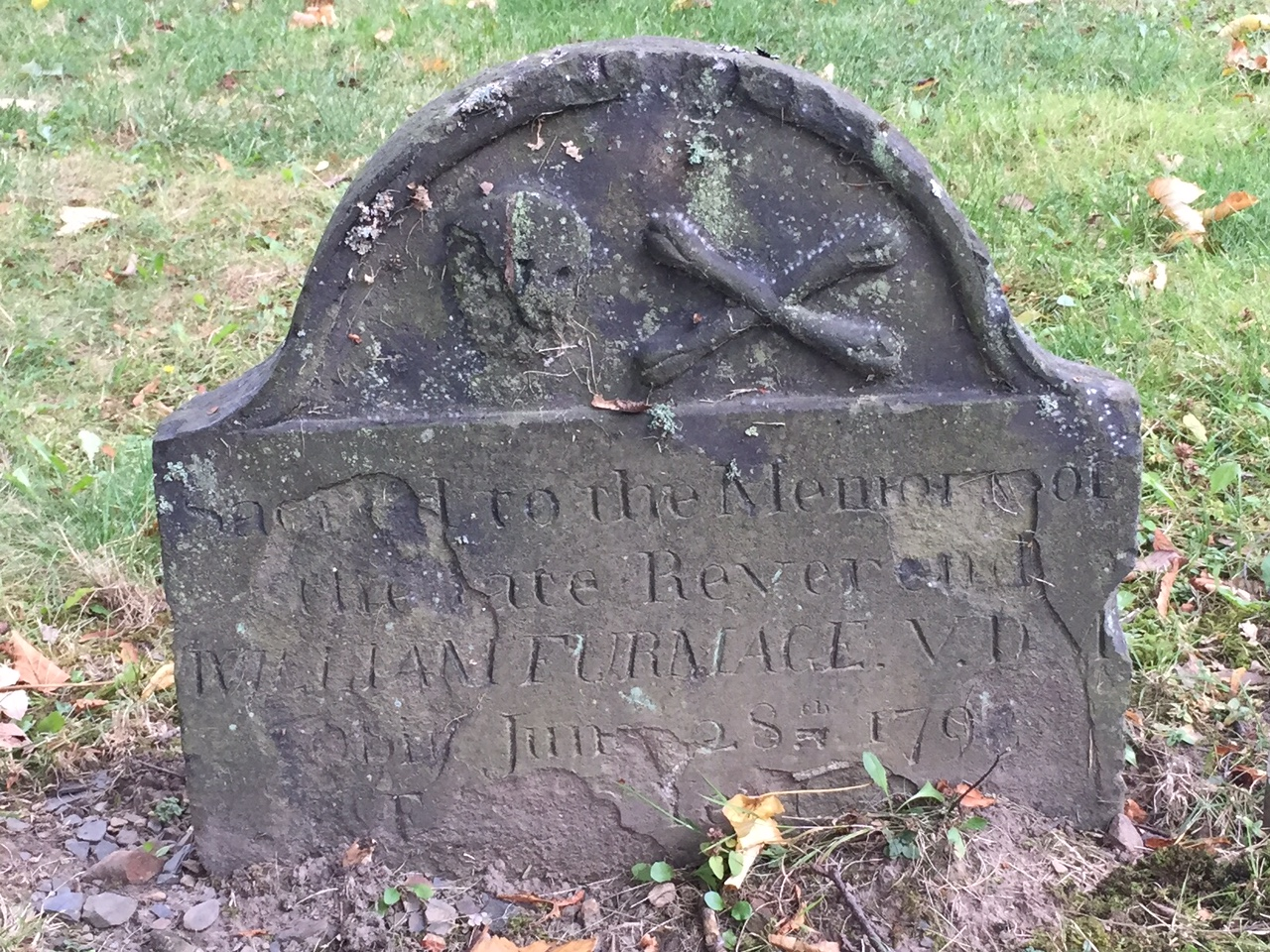
Reverend William Furmage, Huntingdonian Missionary to the Black Loyalists, established black school in Halifax

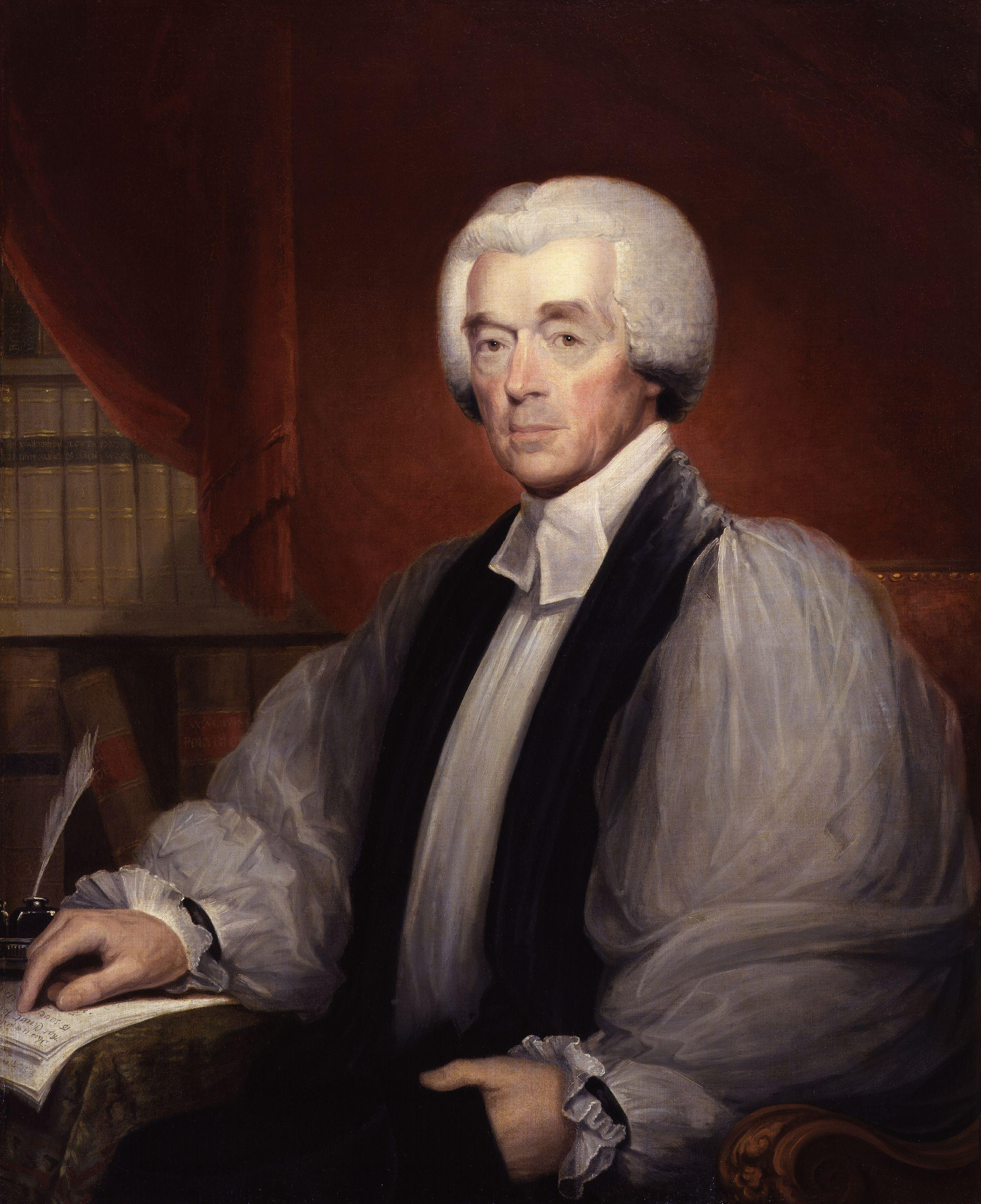
Charles Inglis, supported education for Black Nova Scotians

===== Black Pioneers =====
Many of the black Loyalists performed military service in the British Army, particularly as part of the only black regiment of the war, the Black Pioneers, while others served non-military roles. The soldiers of the Black Pioneers settled in Digby and were given small compensation in comparison to the white Loyalist soldiers. Many of the Black settled under the leadership of Stephen Blucke, a prominent black leader of the Black Pioneers. Historian Barry Moody has referred to Blucke as "the true founder of the Afro-Nova Scotian community."

===== Birchtown =====
Blucke led the founding of Birchtown, Nova Scotia, in 1783. The community was the largest settlement of Black Loyalists and was the largest free settlement of Africans in North America in the 18th century. One of these Loyalists was a woman named Mary Postell, whose status as a free woman was contested. This eventually led to a court trial. The community was named after British Brigadier General Samuel Birch, an official who assisted in the evacuation of Black Loyalists from New York. (Also named after the general was a much smaller settlement of Black Loyalists in Guysborough County, Nova Scotia, called Birchtown.) The two other significant Black Loyalist communities established in Nova Scotia were Brindley town (present-day Jordantown) and Tracadie. Birchtown was located near the larger town of Shelburne, with a majority white population. Racial tensions in Shelburne erupted into the 1784 Shelburne riots, when white Loyalist residents drove Black residents out of Shelburne and into Birchtown. In the years after the riot, Shelbourne county lost population due to economic factors, and at least half of the families in Birchtown abandoned the settlement and emigrated to Sierra Leone in 1792. To accommodate these British subjects, the British government approved 16,000 pounds for the emigration, three times the total annual budget for Nova Scotia. They were led to Sierra Leone by John Clarkson and became known as the Nova Scotian Settlers.

===== Tracadie =====
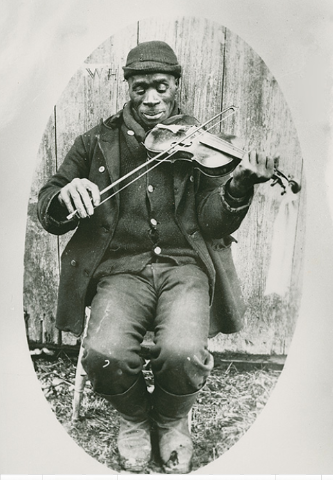
Joe Izard, descendant of former enslaved man named Andrew Izard, Guysborough, c. 1900

The other significant Black Loyalist settlement is Tracadie. Led by Thomas Brownspriggs, Black Nova Scotians who had settled at Chedabucto Bay behind the present-day village of Guysborough migrated to Tracadie (1787). None of the Black people in eastern Nova Scotia migrated to Sierra Leone.

One of the Black Loyalists was Andrew Izard (c. 1755 – ?). He was formerly enslaved by Ralph Izard in St. George, South Carolina. He worked on a rice plantation and grew up on Combahee. When he was young he was valued at 100 pounds. In 1778 Izard made his escape. During the American Revolution he worked for the British army in the wagonmaster-general's department. He was on one of the final ships to leave New York in 1783. He traveled on the Nisbett in November, which sailed to Port Mouton. The village burned to the ground in the spring of 1784 and he was transported to Guysborough. There he raised a family and still has descendants that live in the community.

Education in the Black community was initially advocated by Charles Inglis who sponsored the Protestant Society for the Propagation of the Gospel. Some of the schoolmasters were: Thomas Brownspriggs (c.1788–1790) and Dempsey Jordan (1818–?). There were 23 Black families at Tracadie in 1808; by 1827 this number had increased to 30 or more.

==== Abolition of slavery, 1787–1812 ====
While most Black people who arrived in Nova Scotia during the American Revolution were free, others were not. Enslaved Black peoples also arrived in Nova Scotia as the property of White American Loyalists. In 1772, prior to the American Revolution, Britain outlawed the slave trade in the British Isles followed by the Knight v. Wedderburn decision in Scotland in 1778. This decision, in turn, influenced the colony of Nova Scotia. In 1788, abolitionist James Drummond MacGregor from Pictou published the first anti-slavery literature in Canada and began purchasing slaves' freedom and chastising his colleagues in the Presbyterian church who enslaved people. Historian Alan Wilson describes the document as "a landmark on the road to personal freedom in province and country." Historian Robin Winks writes "[it is] the sharpest attack to come from a Canadian pen even into the 1840s; he had also brought about a public debate which soon reached the courts." In 1790 John Burbidge freed the people he had enslaved.

Led by Richard John Uniacke, in 1787, 1789 and again on January 11, 1808, the Nova Scotian legislature refused to legalize slavery. Two chief justices, Thomas Andrew Lumisden Strange (1790–1796) and Sampson Salter Blowers (1797–1832) waged "judicial war" in their efforts to free enslaved people from their owners in Nova Scotia. They were held in high regard in the colony. Justice Alexander Croke (1801–1815) also impounded American slave ships during this time period (the most famous being the Liverpool Packet). The last slave sale in Nova Scotia occurred in 1804. During the war, Nova Scotian Sir William Winniett served as a crew on board HMS Tonnant in the effort to free enslaved people from America. (As the Governor of the Gold Coast, Winniett would later also work to end the slave trade in Western Africa.) By the end of the War of 1812 and the arrival of the Black Refugees, there were few people left enslaved in Nova Scotia. (The Slave Trade Act 1807 outlawed the slave trade in the British Empire and the Slavery Abolition Act 1833 outlawed slavery all together.)

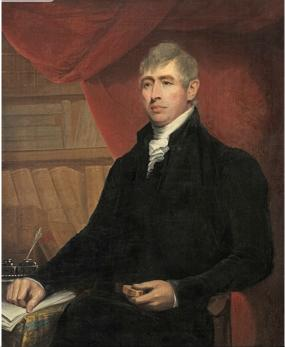
Abolitionist Richard John Uniacke, helped free Black Nova Scotian slaves

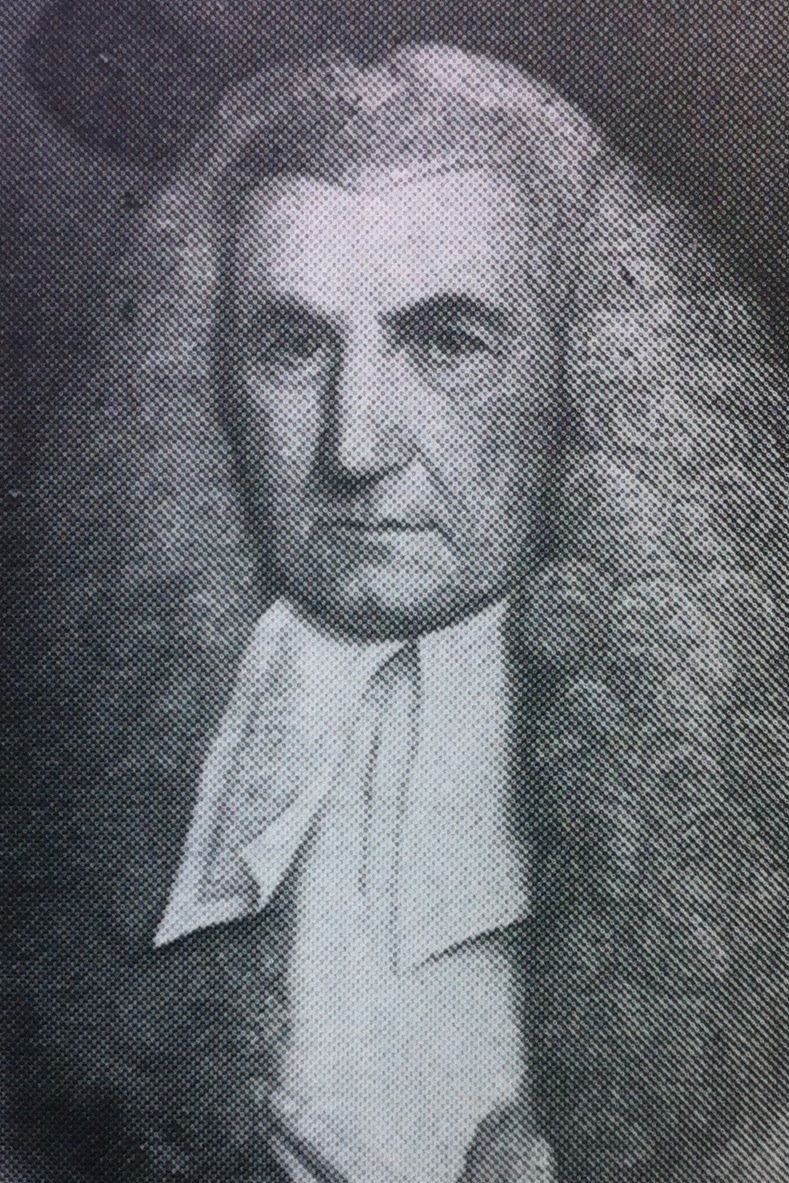
Chief Justice Sampson Salter Blowers, freed Black Nova Scotian slaves

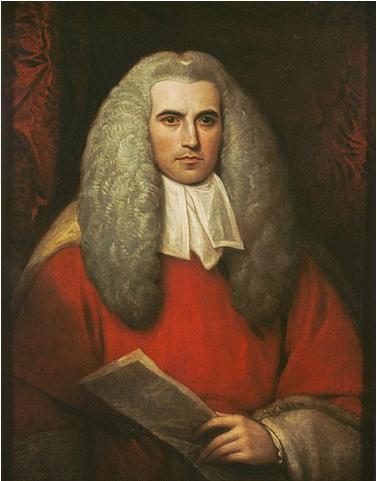
Chief Justice Thomas Andrew Lumisden Strange, freed Black Nova Scotian slaves

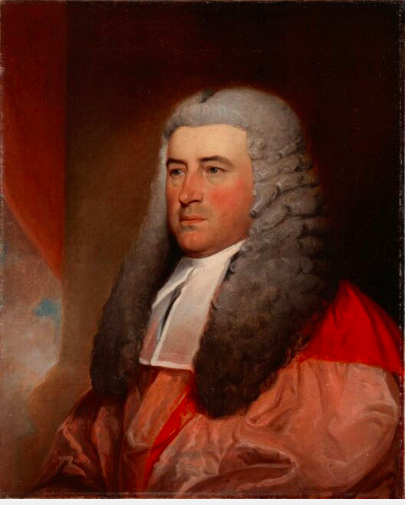
Sir Alexander Croke

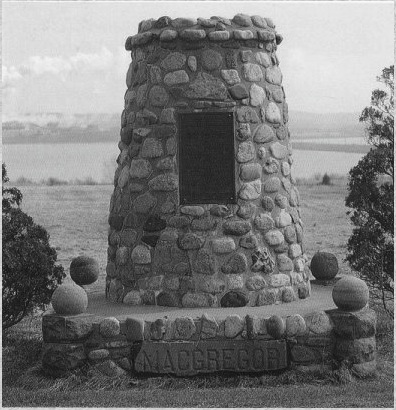
James Drummond MacGregor Monument, Pictou, Nova Scotia

==== Jamaican Maroons ====
According to historian Richard Cannon, on June 26, 1796, 543 men, women and children, Jamaican Maroons, were deported on board the ships Dover, Mary and Anne, from Jamaica after being defeated in an uprising against the British colonial government. However, many historians disagree on the number who were transported from Jamaica to Nova Scotia, with one saying that 568 Maroons of Cudjoe's Town (Trelawny Town) made the trip in 1796. It seems that just under 600 left Jamaica, with 17 dying on the ship, and 19 in their first winter in Nova Scotia. A Canadian surgeon counted 571 Maroons in Nova Scotia in 1797. Their initial destination was Lower Canada but on July 21 and 23, the ships arrived in Nova Scotia. At this time Halifax was experiencing a major construction boom initiated by Prince Edward, Duke of Kent and Strathearn's efforts to modernize the city's defenses. The many building projects had created a labour shortage. Edward was impressed by the Maroons and immediately put them to work at the Citadel in Halifax, Government House, and other defense works throughout the city.

The British Lieutenant Governor Sir John Wentworth, from the monies provided by the Jamaican Government, procured an annual stipend of £240 for the support of a school and religious education. The Maroons complained about the bitterly cold winters, their segregated conditions, unfamiliar farming methods, and less than adequate accommodation. The Maroon leader, Montague James, petitioned the British government for the right to passage to Sierra Leone, and they were eventually granted that opportunity in the face of opposition from Wentworth. On August 6, 1800, the Maroons departed Halifax, arriving on October 1 at Freetown, Sierra Leone. In their new home, the Maroons established a new community at Maroon Town, Sierra Leone.

=== 19th century ===
In 1808, George Prevost authorized a Black regiment to be formed in the colony under captain Silas Hardy and Col. Christopher Benson.

==== War of 1812 ====
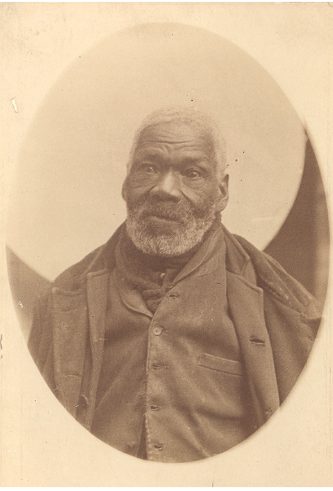
Gabriel Hall, in the only known image of a black refugee from the War of 1812.

The next major migration of Black people into Nova Scotia occurred between 1813 and 1815. Black Refugees from the United States settled in many parts of Nova Scotia including Hammonds Plains, Preston, Beechville, Lucasville and Africville.

Canada was not suited to the large-scale plantation agriculture practiced in the southern United States, and slavery became increasingly rare. In 1793, in one of the first acts of the new Upper Canadian colonial parliament, slavery was abolished. It was all but abolished throughout the other British North American colonies by 1800, and was illegal throughout the British Empire after 1834. This made Canada an attractive destination for those fleeing slavery in the United States, such as American minister Boston King.

==== Royal Acadian School ====
In 1814, Walter Bromley opened the Royal Acadian School which included many Black students – children and adults – whom he taught on the weekends because they were employed during the week. Some of the Black students entered into business in Halifax while others were hired as servants.

In 1836, the African School was established in Halifax from the Protestant Gospel School (Bray School) and was soon followed by similar schools at Preston, Hammond's Plains and Beech Hill.

==== New Horizons Baptist Church ====
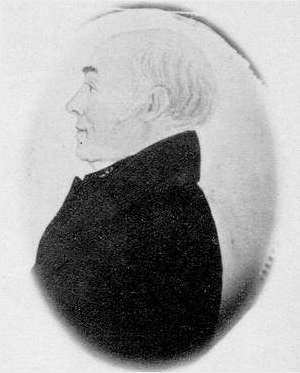
John Burton – founder of one of the first integrated black and white congregations in Nova Scotia (c. 1811)

Following Black Loyalist preacher David George, Baptist minister John Burton was one of the first ministers to integrate Black and white Nova Scotians into the same congregation. In 1811 Burton's church had 33 members, the majority of whom were free Black people from Halifax and the neighbouring settlements of Preston and Hammonds Plains. According to historian Stephen Davidson, they were "shunned, or merely tolerated, by the rest of Christian Halifax, they were first warmly received in the Baptist Church." Burton became known as "an apostle to the coloured people" and would often be sent out by the Baptist association on missionary visits to the black communities surrounding Halifax. He was the mentor of Richard Preston.

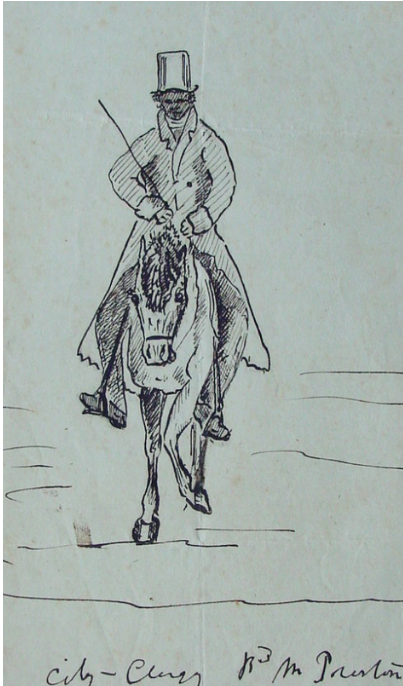
Richard Preston – founder of the first black church in Nova Scotia (1832)

New Horizons Baptist Church (formerly known as Cornwallis Street Baptist Church, the African Chapel, and the African Baptist Church) is a baptist church in Halifax, Nova Scotia that was established by Black Refugees in 1832. When the chapel was completed, Black citizens of Halifax were reported to be proud of this accomplishment because it was evidence that former enslaved people could establish their own institutions in Nova Scotia. Under the direction of Richard Preston, the church laid the foundation for social action to address the plight of Black Nova Scotians.

Preston and others went on to establish a network of socially active Black baptist churches throughout Nova Scotia, with the Halifax church being referred to as the "Mother Church." Five of these churches were established in Halifax: Preston (1842), Beechville (1844), Hammonds Plains (1845), and another in Africville (1849) and Dartmouth. From meetings held at the church, they also established the African Friendly Society, the African Abolition Society, and the African United Baptist Association.

The church remained the centre of social activism throughout the 20th century. Reverends at the church included William A. White (1919–1936) and William Pearly Oliver (1937–1962).

==== American Civil War ====
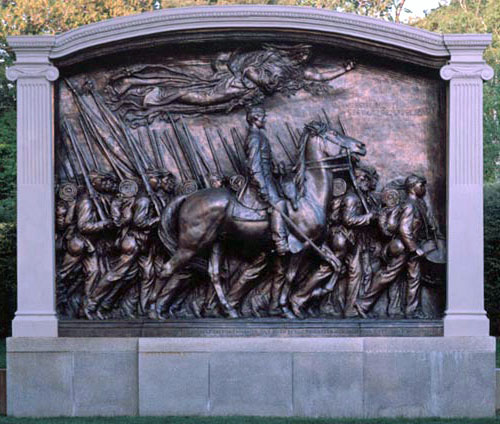
Memorial to the 54th Regiment Massachusetts Volunteer Infantry, Boston

Numerous Black Nova Scotians fought in the American Civil War in the effort to end slavery. Perhaps the most well known Nova Scotians to fight in the war effort are Joseph B. Noil and Benjamin Jackson. Three Black Nova Scotians served in the famous 54th Regiment Massachusetts Volunteer Infantry: Hammel Gilyer, Samuel Hazzard, and Thomas Page.

=== 20th century ===
==== Coloured Hockey League ====
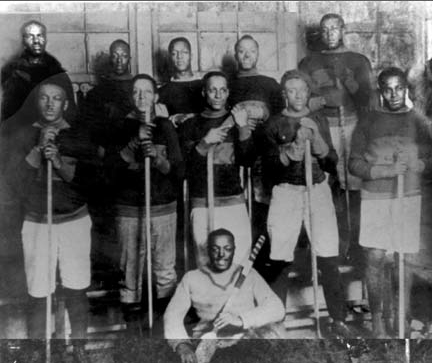
Coloured Hockey League, 1910

In 1894, an all-Black ice hockey league, known as the Coloured Hockey League, was founded in Nova Scotia. Black players from Canada's Maritime provinces (Nova Scotia, New Brunswick, Prince Edward Island) participated in competition. The league began to play 23 years before the National Hockey League was founded, and as such, it has been credited with some innovations which exist in the NHL today. Most notably, it is claimed that the first player to use the slapshot was Eddie Martin of the Halifax Eurekas, more than 100 years ago. The league remained in operation until 1930.

==== World War One ====
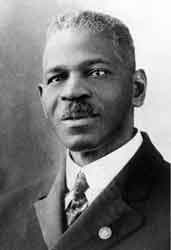
Reverend William A. White – first black officer in the British Empire

The No. 2 Construction Battalion, Canadian Expeditionary Force (CEF), was the only predominantly Black battalion in Canadian military history and also the only Canadian Battalion composed of Black soldiers to serve in World War I. The battalion was raised in Nova Scotia and 56% of battalion members (500 soldiers) came from the province. Reverend William A. White of the Battalion became the first Black officer in the British Empire.

An earlier black military unit in Nova Scotia was the Victoria Rifles.

==== Nova Scotia Association for the Advancement of Coloured People ====
Founded by Pearleen Oliver and led by minister William Pearly Oliver, the Nova Scotia Association for the Advancement of Coloured People was formed in 1945 out of the Cornwallis Street Baptist Church. The organization was intent of improving the standard of living for Black Nova Scotians. The organization also attempted to improve Black-white relations in co-operation with private and governmental agencies. The organization was joined by 500 Black Nova Scotians. By 1956, the NSAACP had branches in Halifax, Cobequid Road, Digby, Weymouth Falls, Beechville, Inglewooe, Hammonds Plains and Yarmouth. Preston and Africville branches were added in 1962, the same year New Road, Cherry Brook, and Preston East requested branches. In 1947, the Association successfully took the case of Viola Desmond to the Supreme Court of Canada. It also pressured the Children's Hospital in Halifax to allow for Black women to become nurses; it advocated for inclusion and challenged racist curriculum in the Department of Education. The Association also developed an Adult Education program with the government department.

By 1970, over one-third of the 270 members were white.

==== Nova Scotia Human Rights Commission ====
Along with Oliver and the direct involvement of the premier of Nova Scotia Robert Stanfield, many Black activists were responsible for the establishment of the Nova Scotia Human Rights Commission (1967). Originally the mandate of the commission was primarily to address the plight of Black Nova Scotians. The first employee and administrative officer of the commission was Gordon Earle.

==== Black United Front ====
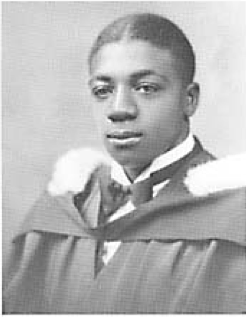
William Pearly Oliver (1934) – founder of the four leading organizations to support Black Nova Scotians in the 20th century

In keeping with the times, Reverend William Oliver began the Black United Front in 1969, which explicitly adopted a Black separatist agenda. The Black separatist movement of the United States had a significant influence on the mobilization of the Black community in 20th Century Nova Scotia. This Black separatist approach to address racism and black empowerment was introduced to Nova Scotia by Marcus Garvey in the 1920s. Garvey argued that Black people would never get a fair deal in white society, so they ought to form separate republics or return to Africa. White people are considered a homogenous group who are essentially racist and, in that sense, are considered unredeemable in efforts to address racism.

Garvey visited Nova Scotia twice, first in the 1920s, which led to a Universal Negro Improvement Association and African Communities League (UNIA) office in Cape Breton, and then the famous 1937 visit. He was initially drawn by the founding of an African Orthodox Church in Sydney in 1921 and maintained contact with the ex-pat West Indian community. The UNIA invited him to visit in 1937. (Garvey presided over UNIA regional conferences and conventions in Toronto, in 1936, 1937, and 1938. At the 1937 meeting he inaugurated his School of African Philosophy.)

Despite objections from Martin Luther King Jr., this separatist politics was reinforced again in the 1960s by the Black Power Movement and especially its militant subgroup the Black Panther Party. Francis Beaufils (a.k.a. Ronald Hill) was a fugitive Black Panther facing charges in the U.S. who had found refuge in rural Nova Scotia. The separatist movement influenced the development of the Halifax-based Black United Front (BUF). Black United Front was a Black nationalist organization that included Burnley "Rocky" Jones and was loosely based on the 10 point program of the Black Panther Party. In 1968, Stokely Carmichael, who coined the phrase Black Power!, visited Nova Scotia helping organize the BUF.

==== Black Cultural Centre for Nova Scotia ====
Reverend William Oliver eventually left the BUF and became instrumental in establishing the Black Cultural Centre for Nova Scotia, which opened in 1983. The organization houses a museum, library and archival area. Oliver designed the Black Cultural Centre to help all Nova Scotians become aware of how Black culture is woven into the heritage of the province. The centre also helps Nova Scotians trace their history of championing human rights and overcoming racism in the province. For his efforts in establishing the four leading organizations in the 20th century to support Black Nova Scotians and, ultimately, all Nova Scotians, William Oliver was awarded the Order of Canada in 1984.

==== Migration out of Nova Scotia ====
Beginning in the 1920s and 1930s, African Nova Scotians began leaving their settlements in order to find work in larger cities and towns such as Halifax, Sydney, Truro and New Glasgow. Many left Nova Scotia for cities such as Toronto and Montreal, while others left Canada altogether for the United States.

Bangor, Maine's lumber industry attracted Black people from Nova Scotia and New Brunswick for decades. They formed a sizeable community on the town's west end throughout the early 1900s. A small African Nova Scotian community had also developed in Sudbury in the late 1940s due to aggressive recruitment efforts in Black Nova Scotian settlements by Vale Inco.

Beginning in the early and mid‑20th century, Black Nova Scotians were part of a broader pattern of migration from Atlantic Canada to Montreal. Academic studies note that Black mobility has long been a feature of Atlantic Canadian history, with migrations occurring throughout the 19th and 20th centuries for economic and social reasons. Many Black workers from Nova Scotia and other Atlantic provinces moved to Montreal to work as railway porters, contributing to the growth of the Black community in Little Burgundy and later in neighbourhoods such as Côte‑des‑Neiges, Verdun, Ville‑Émard, and Côte‑Saint‑Paul. Oral histories document that these families formed part of Montreal's early Black population decades before the more widely recognized migration of Black Nova Scotians to Toronto in the late 20th century.

Some Black Nova Scotians have Afro‑Indigenous ancestry, reflecting long‑standing relationships between African‑descended and Indigenous communities in Atlantic Canada. These connections continued into later migrations, including those who settled in Montreal during the 20th century.

In Montreal, institutions such as the Negro Community Centre in Little Burgundy played a central role in supporting Black anglophone migrants. The centre was led for many years by executive director Stanley Clyke (of Truro, Nova Scotia), whose work emphasized cultural education and community empowerment.

By the 1960s, a Black Nova Scotian neighbourhood had developed in Toronto, around the Kensington Market-Alexandra Park area. First Baptist Church, the oldest Black institution in Toronto, became the spiritual centre of this community. In 1972, Alexandra Park is said to have had a Black Nova Scotian population of over 2,000 – making it more populous than any of the Black settlements in Nova Scotia at the time. Escaping rural communities with little education or skills, young Black Nova Scotians in Toronto faced high poverty and unemployment rates.

In 1977, between 1,200 and 2,400 Black Nova Scotians lived in Montreal. Though dispersed throughout the city, many settled among African-Americans and English-speaking West Indians in Little Burgundy.

Dwayne Johnson, Arlene Duncan, Beverly Mascoll, Tommy Kane, and Wayne Simmonds are examples of prominent individuals who have at least one Black Nova Scotian parent that settled outside the province.

=== 21st century ===
==== Organizations ====
Several organizations have been created by Black Nova Scotians to serve the community. Some of these include the Black Educators Association of Nova Scotia, African Nova Scotian Music Association, Health Association of African Canadians and the Black Business Initiative. Individuals involved in these and other organizations worked together with various officials to orchestrate the government apologies and pardons for past incidents of racial discrimination.

==== Africville Apology ====
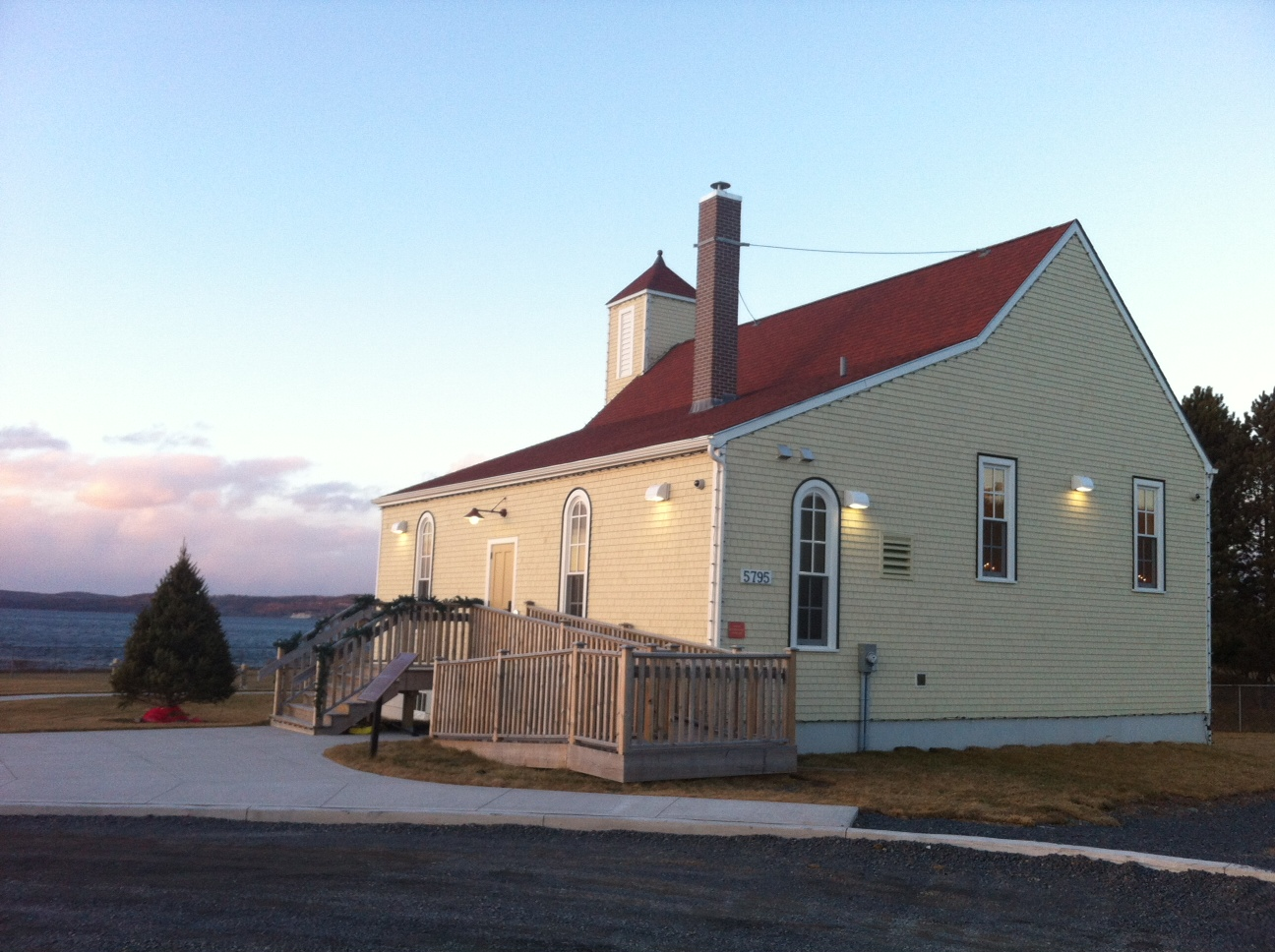
Africville Church (est. 1849) – rebuilt as part of the Africville Apology

The Africville Apology was delivered on February 24, 2010, by Halifax, Nova Scotia, for the eviction and eventual destruction of Africville, a Black Nova Scotian community.

==== Viola Desmond pardon ====
On April 14, 2010, the Lieutenant Governor of Nova Scotia, Mayann Francis, on the advice of her premier, invoked the Royal Prerogative and granted Viola Desmond a posthumous free pardon, the first such to be granted in Canada. The free pardon, an extraordinary remedy granted under the Royal Prerogative of Mercy only in the rarest of circumstances and the first one granted posthumously, differs from a simple pardon in that it is based on innocence and recognizes that a conviction was in error. The government of Nova Scotia also apologised. This initiative happened through Desmond's younger sister Wanda Robson, and a professor of Cape Breton University, Graham Reynolds, working with the Government of Nova Scotia to ensure that Desmond's name was cleared and the government admitted its error.

In honour of Desmond, the provincial government has named the first Nova Scotia Heritage Day after her.

==== Nova Scotia Home for Colored Children apology ====
Children in an orphanage that opened in 1921, the Nova Scotia Home for Colored Children, suffered physical, psychological and sexual abuse by staff over a 50-year period. Ray Wagner is the lead counsel for the former residents who successfully made a case against the orphanage. In 2014, the Premier of Nova Scotia Stephen McNeil wrote a letter of apology and about 300 claimants are to receive monetary compensation for their damages.

==== Immigration ====
Since the immigration reforms of the 1970s, a growing number of people of African descent have moved to Nova Scotia. Members of these groups are not considered a part of the distinct Black Nova Scotian community, although they are Black Canadian. The last group to be accepted as members of the Black Nova Scotian ethnic group are Bajans who came to Cape Breton in the early 1900s, referred to as the "later arrivals".

Top 5 immigrant ethnic origins for people of African descent in Nova Scotia:

Country of origin	Population 2016
Jamaica	480
Nigeria	350
Bahamas	230
Ethiopia	185
Ghana	185

== See also ==
- Indigenous Black Canadians
- Black Canadians in New Brunswick
- The Book of Negroes (2007), novel based on the historic document of the same name, and its 2015 TV miniseries
- Black Loyalist Heritage Centre, museum in Birchtown, Nova Scotia
- Upper Hammonds Plains Volunteer Fire Department, first all-Black volunteer fire department in Canada
