= New Horizons Baptist Church =

Baptist church in Halifax, Canada

Coordinates: 44°39′9.7″N 63°35′1.2″W

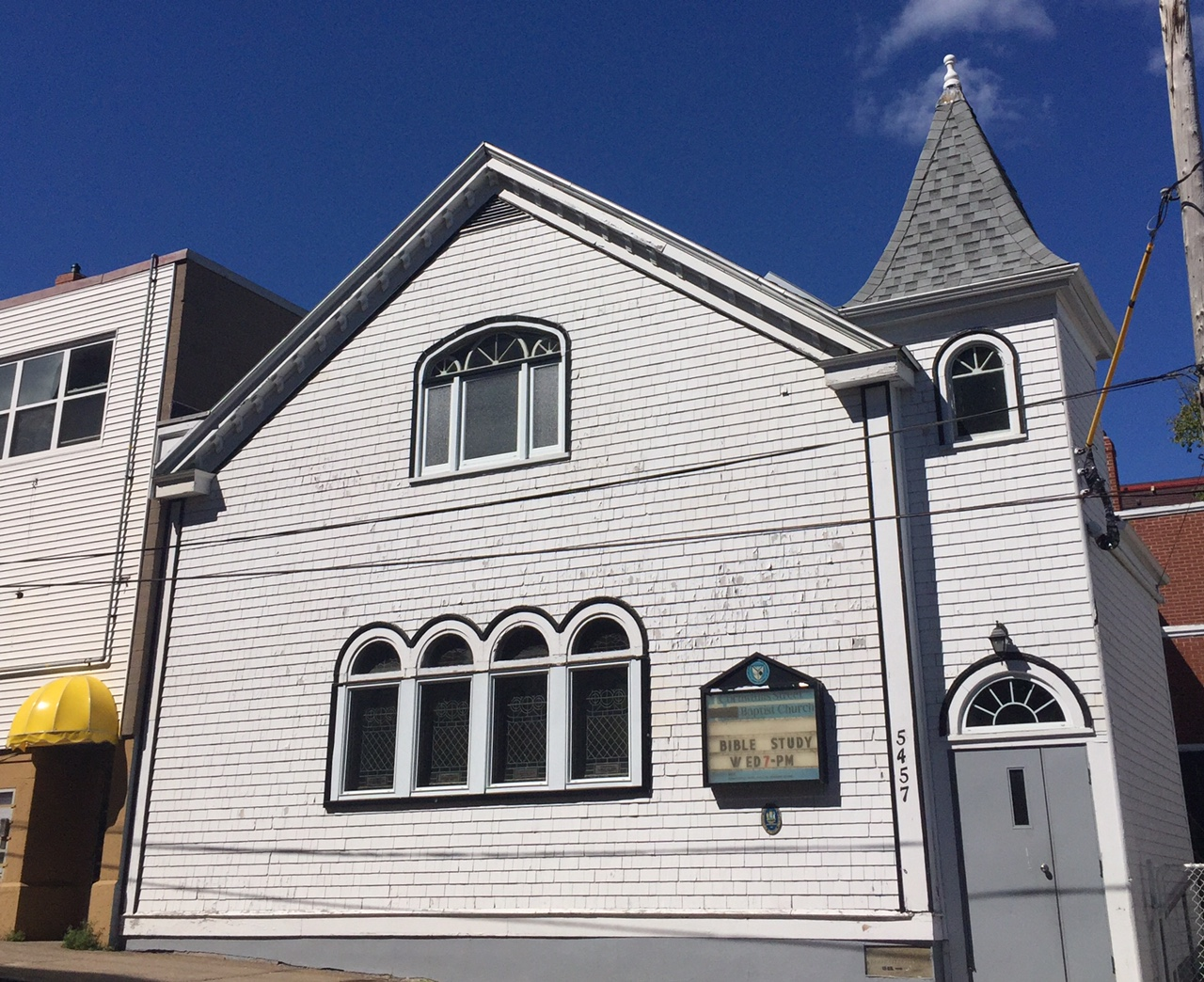
New Horizons Baptist Church, Halifax, Nova Scotia

New Horizons Baptist Church (named Cornwallis Street Baptist Church until 2018) is a Baptist church in Halifax, Nova Scotia that was established by Black Refugees in 1832. When the chapel was completed, black citizens of Halifax were reported to be proud because it was evidence that former slaves could establish their own institutions in Nova Scotia. Under the direction of Richard Preston, the church laid the foundation for social action to address the plight of Black Nova Scotians. It is affiliated with the Canadian Baptists of Atlantic Canada (Canadian Baptist Ministries).

== History ==
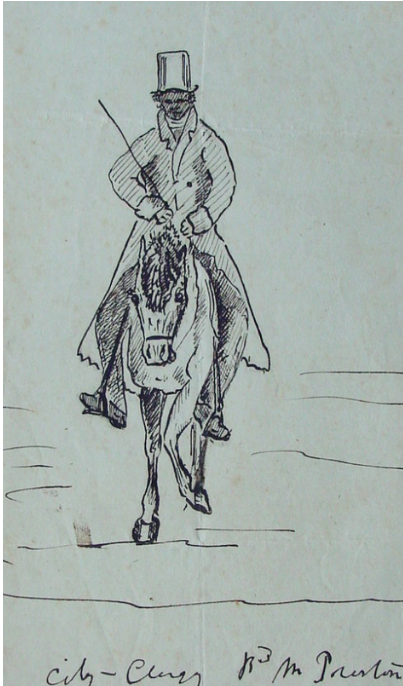
Richard Preston

Preston and others established a network of socially active Black baptist churches throughout Nova Scotia, with the Halifax church being referred to as the "Mother Church." Five of these churches were established in Halifax: Preston (1842), Beechville (1844), Hammonds Plains (1845), and another in Africville (1849) and Dartmouth. From meetings held at the church, they also established the African Friendly Society, the African Abolition Society, and the African United Baptist Association of Nova Scotia (AUBA). In the fight to end slavery in America, Preston stated:

The time will come when slavery will be just one of our many travails. Our children and their children's children will mature to become indifferent toward climate and indifferent toward race. Then we will desire . . . Nay!, we will demand and we will be able to obtain our fair share of wealth, status and prestige, including political power. Our time will have come, and we will be ready . . . we must be.

The church was eventually renamed the Cornwallis Street Baptist Church in 1892, after the street it is situated on.

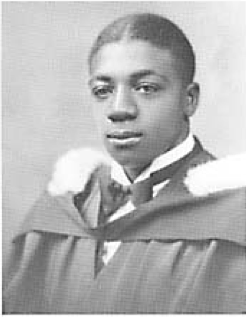
William Pearly Oliver, 1934

The Church survived the Halifax Explosion of 1917 and served as a temporary shelter for survivors for the rest of the winter. Soon after the explosion, Rev. William A. White worked at the church for 17 years until he died in 1936. In 1937, William Pearly Oliver became the minister and by 1945 he and the church developed the Nova Scotia Association for the Advancement of Colored People. The Church was instrumental in supporting the case of Viola Desmond through the courts in the first year Oliver was the minister. Oliver worked at the church for twenty-five years, until 1962.

Renamed the New Horizons Baptist Church in 2017, the church has continued its history of social action through the years. The church has been led by visionary pastors committed to community uplift. For over 30 years the church ran a Hot Lunch Program to feed local school children. The children dubbed the church "The Dinner Church".

In 2005 the church was the subject of a three-episode television documentary. The design project renovated the church's lower hall as a dedicated space for Sunday School.

In 2007, the church called its first female pastor in the person of Rev. Rhonda Y. Britton, an American who was serving another AUBA church in New Glasgow, NS. Rev. Britton completed her Doctor of Ministry degree from Acadia University in 2012 and continues to serve the congregation. Under Dr. Britton's leadership, the church began a Rites of Passage Program for youth 8–18 in an effort to address the growing violence plaguing the black community.

In 2009 Rev. Richard Preston was designated a person of national significance by Parks Canada. The commemorative plaque is mounted outside the church.

In September 2017, the church announced it would give itself a new name that better reflects its values and identity as disciples of Jesus Christ. The leadership launched an initiative inviting members of its congregation to submit entries from which a new name would be chosen. In May 2018, the congregation approved a renaming to "New Horizons Baptist Church."

== Notable members ==
- Richard Preston
- William A. White
- James Robinson Johnston
- Portia White
- Viola Desmond
- John Burton (minister)
- William Pearly Oliver
- Robert Downey (boxer)

== See also ==
- Black Nova Scotians
