= Tracadie =

There are several places with this name. They are all located in Maritime Canada. The name is thought to be derived from the Míkmaq term akatiek 'place', which is pronounced "agadiek".

New Brunswick

- Tracadie, New Brunswick, a regional municipality
- Tracadie-Sheila, the former town at the core of the regional municipality
- Tracadie-Sheila (electoral district)
- Big Tracadie River, the river draining into Tracadie Bay to the south of Tracadie-Sheila
- Little Tracadie River, the river draining into Tracadie Bay through Tracadie-Sheila

Nova Scotia

- Tracadie, Nova Scotia
  - Upper Big Tracadie, Nova Scotia
- Little Tracadie River
- Tracadie River

Prince Edward Island

- Tracadie, Prince Edward Island
- Grand Tracadie
- Tracadie-Fort Augustus Prince Edward Island electoral district

Quebec

- Tracadie lake, located in Montpellier, Papineau Regional County Municipality, in administrative region of Outaouais.
