= Lincolnville, Nova Scotia =

Community in Nova Scotia, Canada

Coordinates: 45°30′12.89″N 61°32′37.3″W

Lincolnville in Nova Scotia

Lincolnville is a small community in the Canadian province of Nova Scotia, located in the Municipality of the District of Guysborough in Guysborough County. Lincolnville is a predominantly African-Canadian community situated next to Upper Big Tracadie. The community is served by the Lincolnville Community Center and the Tracadie United Baptist Church. One of the last segregated schools in Nova Scotia, the Lincolnville School closed in 1983.
