= Acaciaville, Nova Scotia =

Acaciaville
- Community
- Location of Acaciaville, Nova Scotia
- Coordinates: 44°34′45.19″N 65°45′48.5″W
- Country: Canada
- Province: Nova Scotia
- County: Digby
- Municipal District: Digby

Acaciaville is a community in the Canadian province of Nova Scotia, located in the Municipality of the District of Digby in Digby County. The area was first settled by Loyalists in the late 1700s.

The community will be home to the Jordantown-Acaciaville-Conway Centre of Excellence, an under-construction community center run by the Jordantown-Acaciaville-Conway Betterment Association, a non-profit focused on addressing the inequalities of the Black Communities in the realms of employment, housing, education, and lack of social activities. The facility will a feature a 250-seat community room, gymnasium, stage, fitness room, library, meeting room, a seniors’ area, and a rental space.
