= Benjamin Jackson (sailor) =

Canadian veteran of the American Civil War (1835–1915)

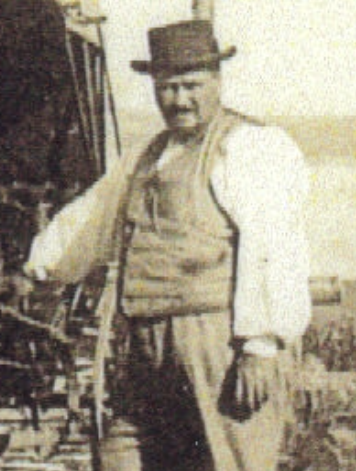
- Jackson in c. 1903
- Born: January 2, 1835; Horton Township, Colony of Nova Scotia, British North America
- Died: August 20, 1915 (aged 80); Lockhartville, Nova Scotia, Canada
- Resting place: Stoney Hill Cemetery, Lockhartville
- Occupations: Sailor, farmer, peddler
- Military service
- Allegiance: United States
- Branch: Union navy
- Service years: 1864–1865
- Role: Gun captain
- Unit: West Gulf Blockading Squadron
- Commands: Gun No. 10, USS Richmond
- Conflict: American Civil War; Union blockade; Battle of Mobile Bay
- Awards: Civil War Campaign Medal

Benjamin Jackson (January 2, 1835 – August 20, 1915) was a Canadian sailor and farmer who was a decorated veteran of the American Civil War. Raised in a small community of Black Nova Scotians, Jackson began his career as a commercial seaman at 16 years old and started a farm in his twenties.

During the American Civil War, Jackson served for one year in the Union navy in the place of a drafted US citizen. For most of that year, he was deployed in the Union blockade of the Confederate coastline. As a gun captain aboard the USS Richmond, Jackson served in the Battle of Mobile Bay. He disarmed multiple naval mines and once picked up a live shell and threw it from the deck of the Richmond. Jackson likely earned an enlistment bounty, as well as prize money, by capturing multiple blockade runners. He developed bronchitis, suffered a serious hand injury, and eventually received a Civil War Campaign Medal for serving during that conflict.

After the war, he lived the rest of his life in Lockhartville, Nova Scotia. He retired from commercial sailing in 1875 but continued managing his farm of 11 hectares (27 acres) and selling fish, vegetables, and other goods. Jackson received a Civil War pension for more than 50 years, though he had to navigate the intricacies of the US Pension Office system to maintain and increase payments as he became eligible.

Jackson's funeral was described as "the largest seen in Lockhartville for many years". His grave remained unmarked until 2010, when a headstone was unveiled at an event attended by his great-great-granddaughter, Government of Nova Scotia officials, and American Civil War reenactors. As of 1999, one of the eight history markers on the Mathieu da Costa African Heritage Trail is dedicated to his story. Ben Jackson Road in Hantsport, Nova Scotia, is also named in his honour.

== Early life ==
Benjamin Jackson was born on January 2, 1835, (Note: There is some uncertainty about the exact date of Jackson's birth.) in a log house in Horton Township in the British colony of Nova Scotia. His parents were freedom seekers who escaped slavery in the United States to British North America as refugees of the War of 1812, settling in Lower Horton (later renamed Lockhartville). Jackson was one of 39 children in that community's ten Black Nova Scotian families; in 1850, those families petitioned local authorities to build a school. At 16 years old in 1851, he took his first commission as a mariner, shipping out of Horton on the brig Chalerodonia. He served on several voyages with its Horton-based captain, George King, who was also a shipowner. He also sailed under Captains John Toy and Benjamin Nason.

In January 1859, Jackson married Rachel Carter of nearby Windsor Plains, an area that was later divided into Three Mile Plains and Five Mile Plains. The couple established a farm together in Lower Horton and Jackson stopped sailing for a few years. They had two daughters together: Louisa in 1863 and Georgina in 1864.

== American Civil War ==
=== Enlistment ===
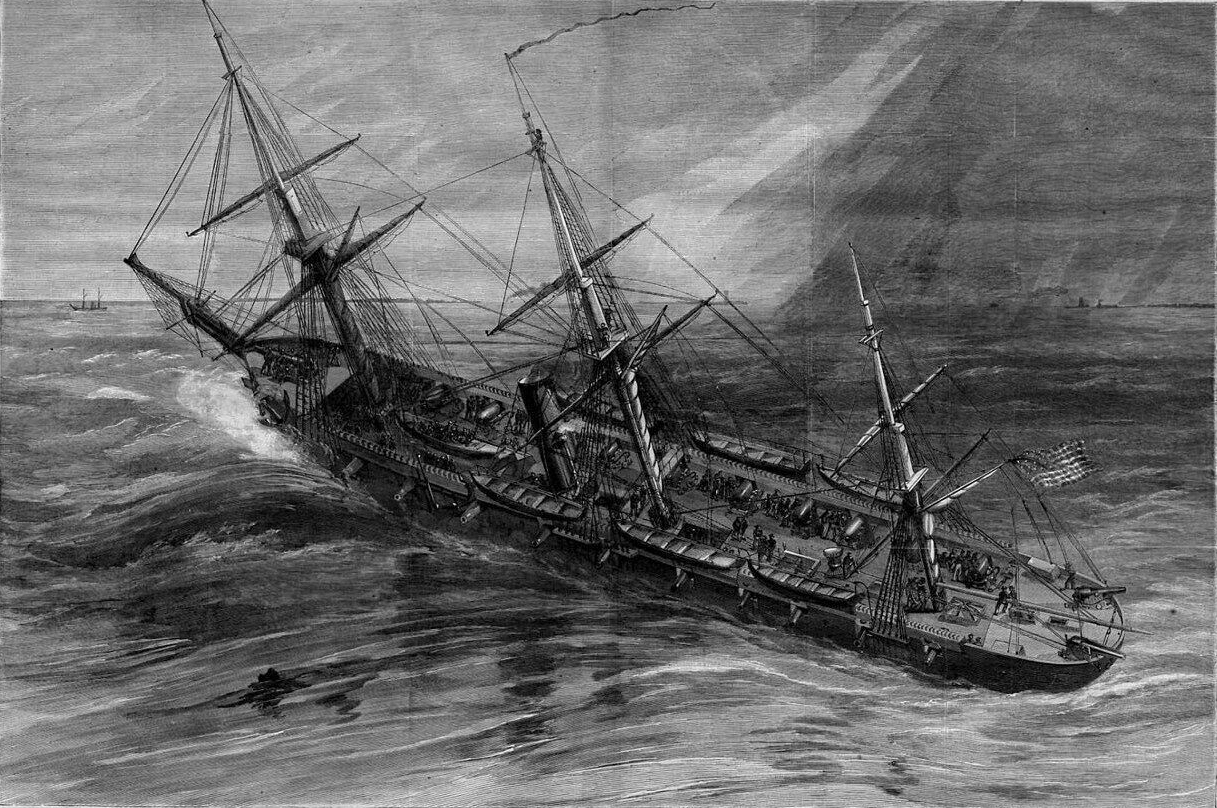
USS Richmond pursuing blockade runners in 1864

In December 1863, Jackson left his farm to accept a position as ship's cook on the Saint John, New Brunswick–based Marlborough sailing to Liverpool, then to New York City. On May 21, 1864, while in New York, he signed up for a three-year enlistment in the Union navy during the American Civil War. Jackson was assigned to the USS North Carolina, a 74-gun receiving ship stationed at the New York Navy Yard. Having enlisted as a substitute for a drafted American citizen named Lewis Saunders, Jackson likely received a bounty of at least US$300 (equivalent to $7,845 in 2025). (Note: Jackson's obituary claims that he was pressed into service aboard a Union navy warship while on shore in New York. Historian Richard M. Reid dismisses the claim, citing Jackson's own account from his pension form and other post-war documentation with the US Pension Office.) For the duration of his enlistment, he served under Saunders's name. Jackson sent his enlistment money to his wife via a justice of the peace in Kings County, Nova Scotia.

At the time of Jackson's enlistment, the Union was imposing a naval blockade on the Confederate States of America to cut off those states' maritime trade. The West Gulf Blockading Squadron was assigned over 1,600 kilometres (990 mi) of the Gulf of Mexico coastline between St. Andrews Bay, Florida, and the Texas–Mexico border. Commanded by Rear Admiral David Farragut, it was the most active of the four Union blockade squadrons. In addition to their blockading assignments further from the coastline, the squadron engaged the Confederate military in bays, rivers, and straits. To correct consistent staffing shortages, the squadron began actively recruiting Black sailors. Jackson soon left New York, advancing to a new post on the USS Potomac, an 88-gun frigate stationed as a receiving ship at Pensacola, Florida.

=== Union Blockade and Battle of Mobile Bay ===
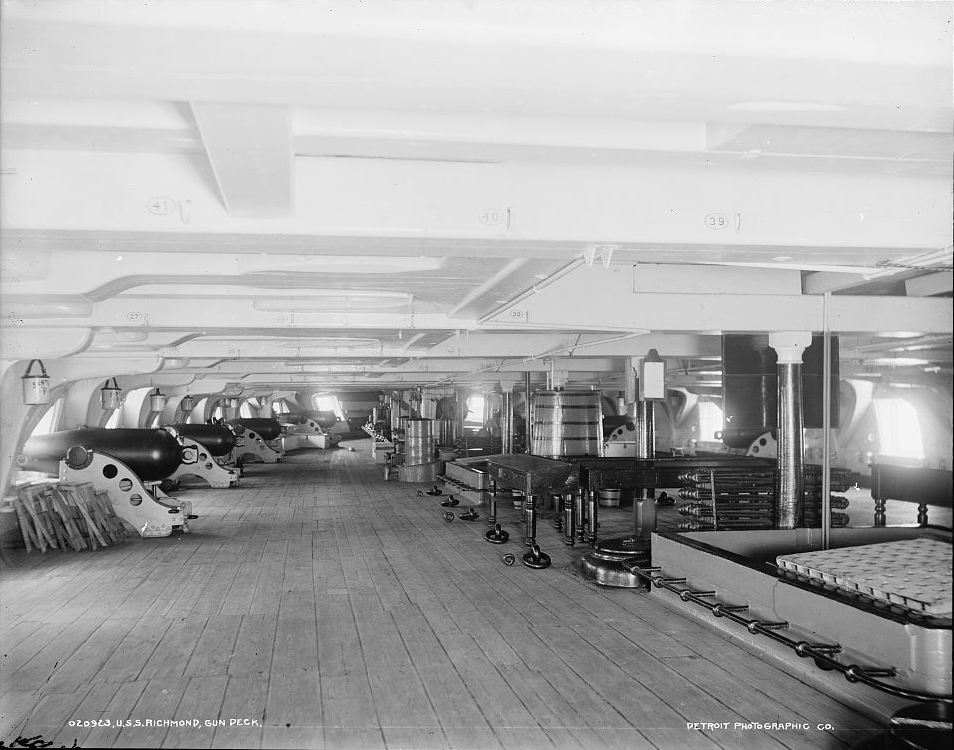
Gun deck of the USS Richmond c. 1890

Jackson was soon promoted, transferring to the USS Richmond, a steam-powered, wooden sloop-of-war stationed off the heavily-fortified and Confederate-controlled Mobile Bay. Jackson's position on the Richmond was captain of gun No. 10, a role in which he continued to serve during the Battle of Mobile Bay. On August 5, 1864, Farragut ordered his fleet into the bay, with the Richmond lashed to the starboard side of the wooden steamship Port Royal. With the fleet under fire from Fort Morgan, the monitor Tecumseh struck a naval mine and sank in under one minute. To avoid the same fate, the sloop-of-war Brooklyn changed course and nearly struck the bow of the Richmond. Confusion cascaded to the rest of the fleet until Farragut ordered the ships forward through the field of mines, which were called "torpedoes" at the time. Following the command popularly remembered as "Damn the torpedoes ... full speed ahead", the Richmond proceeded into the bay and fired upon four Confederate steamships, three of which were captured by the US fleet. At the end of the day, the Richmond reported no casualties and little damage.

Following the main day of battle, Richmond and other ships began the siege of Fort Morgan by maintaining a continuous 24-hour bombardment of the fort as the Union army attacked on land. After the fort surrendered on August 23, 1864, the Richmond continued operating in Mobile Bay and Pensacola Bay. That September, Jackson served several days on a salvage crew working under difficult conditions on the wreck of a blockade runner. He developed bronchitis shortly thereafter and was admitted to a hospital for treatment. (Note: Bronchitis was more common among sailors than soldiers during the American Civil War.) A month after his hospitalization ended, Jackson sustained an injury to his right hand, which was likely serious. He was sent to a navy hospital in Pensacola, then transferred to another in New York. Documentation relating to the injury varies in its descriptions of both the cause and severity. One report linked it to the Battle of Mobile Bay. Two reports claimed Jackson was injured while removing a mine from the Mississippi River, one of them stating that the injury was caused by a mine explosion. Jackson disarmed multiple mines while serving in the navy.

=== Summary and discharge ===
During his navy service, Jackson picked up a live shell from the deck of his ship and threw it overboard, likely saving the vessel and multiple lives. Jackson is credited with saving several lives during multiple engagements with Confederate forces. Although Jackson had agreed to a three-year enlistment with the navy, he was honourably discharged after one year and twelve days on June 2, 1865, for "chronic bronchitis of uncertain duration", according to his discharge form. He returned home to Nova Scotia with US$900 (equivalent to about $19,000 in 2025) prize money from blockade runners he and his fellow sailors seized in the Gulf of Mexico. He was eventually awarded a Civil War Campaign Medal.

== Later life ==
=== Employment and family ===
Like most Black veterans of the Union navy from British North America, (Note: Unlike those who served in the Navy, about half of the Black veterans of the Union army from British North America stayed in the US.) Jackson returned to his home country. Jackson came home to Lockhartville, resuming work as a mariner on multiple Nova Scotia–based vessels on trips out of nearby Hantsport to the UK and the Mediterranean Sea. Most of those ships were owned by either Shubael Dimock or Ezra Churchill. Jackson wore a glove while in public to conceal his hand injury. He developed and maintained relationships with many people throughout Hants and Kings Counties, including William Hall, a Royal Navy veteran who was also raised in Horton by Black refugee parents. In 1867, Nova Scotia joined New Brunswick and the Province of Canada via Canadian Confederation to form one state; Jackson and his family became Canadian.

Jackson and his wife had three more children: Benjamin B. Jackson in 1868, Margaret M. Jackson in 1871, and James William Jackson in 1872. Both Benjamin and James died in childhood. Jackson retired from commercial sailing in 1875 when he was about 40 years old. He continued working his farm of 11 hectares (27 acres) and started selling fish, vegetables, and other goods as a peddler, transporting them on a black horse named Jack. He was still working as a peddler in 1907.

=== Pension issues ===
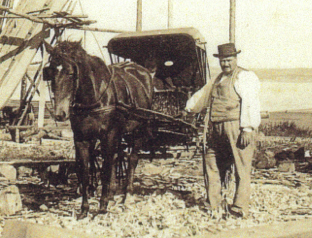
Benjamin Jackson with his horse, Jack c. 1903

To supplement his income, Jackson received a military pension of US$4 (equivalent to about $80 in 2025) a month upon discharge from the navy. This amount was calculated to compensate for losing half the function of one hand. Because he served under the name Lewis Saunders, the payments came to him under that name. On January 25, 1879, he applied for an additional pension for disability, as he was eligible for a lump sum of more than US$600 (equivalent to about $21,000 in 2025). In order to prove to the US Pension Office that he was the same person who served under the Saunders name, in May he submitted a deposition from childhood friend and fellow sailor Daniel Crowell, who had visited Jackson aboard the USS Richmond and noted everyone on board knew him as Saunders. Jackson also paid US$10 to hire a pension agent in Washington, D.C., to submit his application. The issue was not settled until 1887 when the Pension Office received corroborating letters from the US consul in Halifax that added Jackson was "a worthy man instead of a nuisance whenever he comes to town".

Jackson kept track of legislation at the United States Congress and applied for increases when eligible, though the Pension Office raised the Saunders name issue almost every time. The pension increased to US$8 a month in 1888, $10 in 1890, and $14 in 1892. It later increased to $17 a month, then $20 c. 1910, by which time he was partially blind. Historian Richard M. Reid points out that Jackson's successive and successful applications indicate not only that Jackson was determined, but also that the war left him with real disabilities. Reid also generalized Jackson's experience as illustrative of the risk and reward associated with Civil War military service. Jackson received more than US$5,000 over 50 years, but had risked injury and death to be eligible. In his case, he was partially disabled for more than half his life.

=== Second marriage and death ===
Rachel died in May 1913 after 55 years of marriage. Jackson remarried in July 1914 to 49-year-old sailor's widow Mary Eliza Martin. It is possible that this marriage was like those of other aging American Civil War veterans, many of whom married younger women who promised domestic care in exchange for the possibility of a Civil War widow's pension upon the veteran's death. Benjamin Jackson died in Lockhartville on August 20, 1915, and was buried according to his wishes beside Rachel Jackson in Stoney Hill Cemetery. His obituary claimed that the funeral "was the largest seen in Lockhartville for many years". The grave was left unmarked, as was common for American Civil War veterans from Nova Scotia. Mary's pension application was rejected on the grounds that they were not married prior to June 27, 1890, per the Dependent and Disability Pension Act.

== Legacy ==
On June 12, 2010, a headstone at Jackson's grave was unveiled by one of his great-great-granddaughters at a funeral service designed to replicate elements common for Civil War veterans. Also present were members of the Royal Canadian Legion, Lieutenant Governor of Nova Scotia Mayann Francis, Premier Darrell Dexter, and Minister of African Nova Scotian Affairs and Minister of Tourism, Culture and Heritage Percy Paris. The headstone was procured by the five-member Committee to Honour Ben Jackson, who felt that Jackson had long deserved one. The service was performed in period costume by the 20th Maine Reenactment Infantry Regiment, a group of American Civil War reenactors. At funerals they attend, the group fires volleys with replica muskets and adorns graves with Grand Army of the Republic plaques; a chaplain also speaks.

In 1999, Parks Canada and the Department of Canadian Heritage recognized the Mathieu da Costa African Heritage Trail in western Nova Scotia as a point of historical significance, making it Canada's first Black history trail. One of its eight history markers is dedicated to Jackson's story. It is located at the Hantsport School in Hantsport. Ben Jackson Road in that community is named in Jackson's honour.

== See also ==
- Canada and the American Civil War
- Military history of Nova Scotia
- Military history of African Americans in the American Civil War
