= Alexander Croke =

Canadian politician

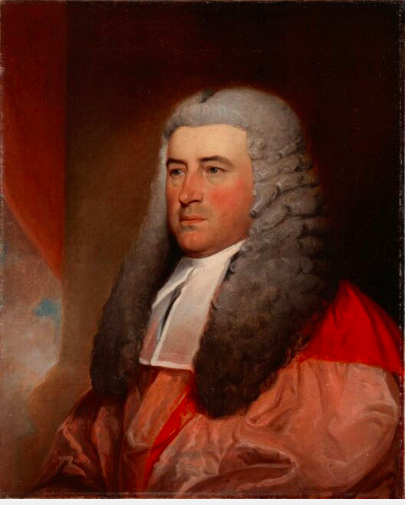
Sir Alexander Croke by Robert Field, National Gallery of Canada

Sir Alexander Croke (July 22, 1758 – December 27, 1842) was a British judge, colonial administrator and author influential in Nova Scotia of the early nineteenth century.

== Life ==
Croke was born in Aylesbury, England, to a wealthy family and attended Oriel College, Oxford, where he earned the degree of Doctor of Civil Law. He was called to the bar in 1786. Practicing maritime law, he earned a strong enough reputation for his work that in 1801 he was offered his choice of appointments to the newly established vice-admiralty courts in Nova Scotia or the West Indies.

He married Alice Blake in 1796.

== Career ==
Croke's bench in Nova Scotia had considerable jurisdiction: it covered all maritime cases in a colony based largely on fishing and where smuggling was commonplace. Since the population and the Assembly was highly sympathetic to smuggling, the court, which denied jury trials to the accused was unpopular. During the War of 1812, the ever-conservative Croke even found guilty merchants who had been granted licences by colonial authorities to engage in the slave trade with New England, on the grounds that he could not support an illegal policy.

His appointment to the Nova Scotia Council in 1802 gave him seniority over the other councilors, contrary to the established order. As the senior councilor, Croke administered the colony while the lieutenant governor was away, from December 6, 1808, to April 15, 1809, and again from August 25 to October 16, 1811. His administration was marked with conflict with the Assembly, whose budget he vetoed.

Croke influenced the development of educational institutions in Nova Scotia. He was on the first board of King's College and was primarily responsible for drafting its statutes, which required students to subscribe to the Anglican faith (as only a quarter of Nova Scotians did). When a strong movement to establish inter-denominational education appeared a few years later, Croke was among its most vocal opponents.

Croke published works of satirical poetry (which exacerbated his unpopularity in certain circles), a book on the genealogy of his family, and many letters.

He left Nova Scotia in 1815 and was knighted on July 5, 1816. He died in 1842 at his family home Studley Priory, Oxfordshire.

== See also ==
- List of lieutenant governors of Nova Scotia
- Decline of slavery in Nova Scotia
