= Black refugee (War of 1812) =

Black refugees during the war of 1812

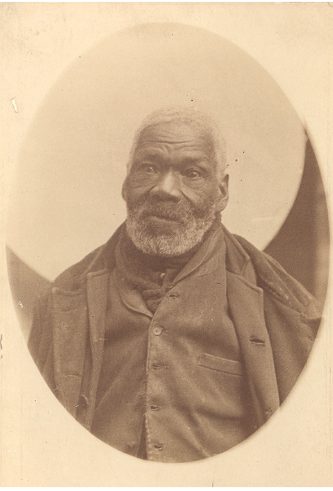
A picture of Gabriel Hall, the only known image of a Black Nova Scotian who migrated to the colony during the War of 1812

The Black refugees were Black American slaves who escaped slavery in the United States during the War of 1812 and settled in Nova Scotia, New Brunswick and Trinidad and Tobago. The Black Refugees were chiefly from Maryland, Virginia, North Carolina, Louisiana, and Georgia. Most of them were evacuated to Halifax, Nova Scotia, New Brunswick, as well as Trinidad & Tobago on British ships from the East Coast of the United States. These individuals were formerly enslaved African Americans who had escaped the slave plantations during the War of 1812 and joined the British forces. Over 2,000 Black Refugees reached Nova Scotia, they were chiefly settled in depopulated sterile lands in The Prestons, Hammonds Plains, Beechville, and by 1848 became the Founders of Africville. The Black Refugees are the progenitors of the majority of the black community in present-day Nova Scotia. They were the most numerous of the African Americans who sought freedom during the War of 1812. In The Nova Scotia Archives many of the arrivals are recorded as "Blacks From The Chesapeake".

Many among the refugees were recruited into the British military as part of the Second Corps of Colonial Marines. In 1816, approximately 700 were settled in southern Trinidad, where they and their descendants came to be known as the Merikins (also spelled Merikens). Black Refugees is the term used in Canada for those who settled in Nova Scotia and New Brunswick. The Black Refugees were the 2nd group of American Blacks after the Black Loyalists, to flee American enslavement in wartime and settle in Canada. The 2nd group, "Black Refugees" from the War of 1812, make up the most significant single immigration source for today's African Nova Scotian communities. During the antebellum period, however, an estimated 10,000 to 30,000 Black refugees reached freedom in Canada, often traveling alone or in small family groups.

== Background ==
During 1813 and the War of 1812 with the United States, Vice Admiral Warren was ordered to receive aboard his ships any blacks who might petition him for assistance. These he was to receive as free men, not as slaves, and send them to any of several of His Majesty's colonies. Captain Robert Barrie of HMS Dragon reported to Admiral Warren "there is no doubt but the blacks of Virginia and Maryland would cheerfully take up arms and join us against the Americans." By the time that the Admiralty received the report, they had already decided to order Warren's successor, Vice-Admiral Sir Alexander Cochrane, to encourage emigration of African-American slaves.

As with the precedents of Lord Dunmore’s Proclamation of November 7, 1775, and the Philipsburg Proclamation, Cochrane issued a Proclamation in partial implementation of instructions from his superiors. He made no explicit mention of slaves, although he presumed it would be read as encouraging them to join the British:

'A Proclamation

Whereas it has been represented to me that many persons now resident in the United States have expressed a desire to withdraw therefrom with a view to entering into His Majesty's service, or of being received as free settlers into some of His Majesty's colonies.

This is therefore to give notice that all persons who may be disposed to migrate from the United States, will with their families, be received on board of His Majesty's ships or vessels of War, or at the military posts that may be established upon or near the coast of the United States, when they will have their choice of either entering into His Majesty's sea or land forces, or of being sent as free settlers to the British possessions in North America or the West Indies where they will meet with due encouragement.

Given under my hand at Bermuda this second day of April, 1814, by command of Vice Admiral.

Alex Cochrane'

Cochrane's proclamation made no mention of slaves, and it was widely misinterpreted by some American slaveholders as an incitement to violent revolt by their slaves.

The flow of African-American refugees to the British had already been considerable. Cochrane's action did no more than confirm what had been happening for over a year. Some years after the arrival in Nova Scotia of the Black refugees, a plan was proposed for them to be sent to the Colony of Freetown, Sierra Leone. Nearly 2,000 of their African-American brethren had relocated there in the late 18th century, but the plan was only partly fulfilled. For the most part the Black refugees remained in Nova Scotia and New Brunswick. A group responded to a related invitation to move to Trinidad and Tobago.

To a limited extent like the Black Loyalists, some of the Black refugees' names were recorded in a document called the Halifax List: Return of American Refugee Negroes who have been received into the Province of Nova Scotia from the United States of America between 27 April 1815 and 24 October 1818. This list was compiled and used to take account for American "property" from the War of 1812. By International Arbitration, Britain was found to owe The Americans 1,204,960 for Black Refugees carried away from Maryland, Virginia, North Carolina, Louisiana, and Georgia. The majority of these came from the first two states, and the bulk of them sent to Nova Scotia.

== Outcome ==
In total, about 4,000 Africans escaped to the British by way of the Royal Navy, the largest group emancipation of African Americans prior to the American Civil War. About 2,000 settled in Nova Scotia, 700 in Trinidad, and about 400 settled in New Brunswick. Together they were the largest single source of African-American immigrants, whose descendants formed the core of African Canadians. Many contemporary white Americans, most prominently slaveholding white Southerners, claimed that fugitive slaves who escaped to the British were forced to do so; they also alleged that such slaves were resold into slavery in the British West Indies. Such claims were occasionally echoed by British critics of the War of 1812. In response British authorities investigated such claims in 1815 and found them to be false. The American historian Alan Taylor notes that such false claims stemmed from delusions of the American planter class, who for the most part genuinely believed that their slaves were content with enslavement and were shocked to see even well-treated slaves escape to the British.

Black refugees in Nova Scotia were first housed in the former prisoner-of-war camp on Melville Island. After the War of 1812, it was adapted as an immigration facility. From Melville Island, they moved to settlements around Halifax and in the Annapolis Valley. These settlements were given as licensed property for the refugees entering Nova Scotia. While it was not land they owned completely, it gave the refugees the chance to start communities of their own. The passengers on the shipwrecked HMS Atalante (1808) included twenty American refugee slaves from the James River in Virginia. They were among the first of the Black refugees of the War of 1812 to reach Canada. Other Black refugees were settled in Trinidad, most having served in the Corps of Colonial Marines. They included around 200 refugees from Louisiana and East and West Florida and 500 from Maryland, Virginia, and Georgia. The community in Trinidad became known as the Merikins and their villages, established by members of different companies, still exist.

== Descendants ==
The Black refugees make up the largest single source of ancestors for Black Nova Scotians and formed the core of African Nova Scotian communities and churches that still exist today. In 1848 William Brown Sr. and William Arnold established and founded the boundaries of Africville. Edith MacDonald Brown has become the first recorded black female painter in Canada. Numbers of Black Refugees settled in Hammonds Plains, North and East Preston, Nova Scotia, where their descendants still live. Many other Black refugees settled in other communities, such as Hammonds Plains, Beechville, Windsor and communities throughout the Nova Scotia's Annapolis Valley. Africville was the solution to the hardships encountered by the sterile lands at Preston & Hammonds Plains.

The migration included the religious leader and abolitionist Richard Preston, who established the first African Baptist church in Halifax; the parents of William Hall, one of Canada's first winners of a Victoria Cross; and Benjamin Jackson, a decorated veteran of the American Civil War. The Black refugees in Nova Scotia were largely from Virginia and Maryland, and they brought basket-making skills from the Chesapeake Region. These are still practiced by their descendants. These baskets are very distinct in style from the existing Mi'kmaw and Acadian basket-making styles by other ethnic groups in the region.

== See also ==
- Black Nova Scotians
- Runaway slaves in Spanish Florida

== Sources ==
- Crawford, Michael J.; Hughes, Christine F., eds. (2002). The Naval War of 1812: A Documentary History, Vol. 3. Washington: Naval Historical Center (GPO). ISBN 978-0-16-051224-7.
- Grant, John N. (1990). Immigration and Settlement of the Black Refugees of the War of 1812 in Nova Scotia and New Brunswick (PDF). Hantsport, N.S.: Lancelot Press. ISBN 0-88999-437-4.
- Heidler, David Stephen; Heidler, Jeanne T., eds. (2004) [1997]. Encyclopedia of the War of 1812. Annapolis, Maryland: Naval Institute Press. ISBN 1-59114-362-4.
- Malcomson, Thomas (October 2012). "Freedom by Reaching the Wooden World: American Slaves and the British Navy during the War of 1812" (PDF). Northern Mariner. 22 (4). The Canadian Nautical Research Society: 361–392. doi:10.25071/2561-5467.294.
- Taylor, Alan (2014). The Internal Enemy: Slavery and War in Virginia, 1772–1832. W. W. Norton & Company. ISBN 978-0-3933-4973-3 – via archive.org.
- Taylor, Matthew (2026). Black Redcoats: The Corps of Colonial Marines (second ed.). Barnsley, Yorkshire: Pen and Sword Books. ISBN 978-1-39-903402-9.
- Whitfield, Harvey Amani (September 2005). "The Development of Black Refugee Identity in Nova Scotia: 1813-1850". Left History. 10 (2). doi:10.25071/1913-9632.5679.
- Whitfield, Harvey Amani (2006). Blacks on the Border: The Black Refugees in British North America, 1815-1860. University of Vermont Press.
- "Africville; Canada's Most Famous Black Community". Archived from the original on 1 October 2011 – via DaCosta 400.
- "Black Refugees" – via Nova Scotia Archives and Records Management.
