= Studley Priory, Oxfordshire =

16th Century Benedictine nunnery

Coordinates: 51°48′20″N 1°08′05″W

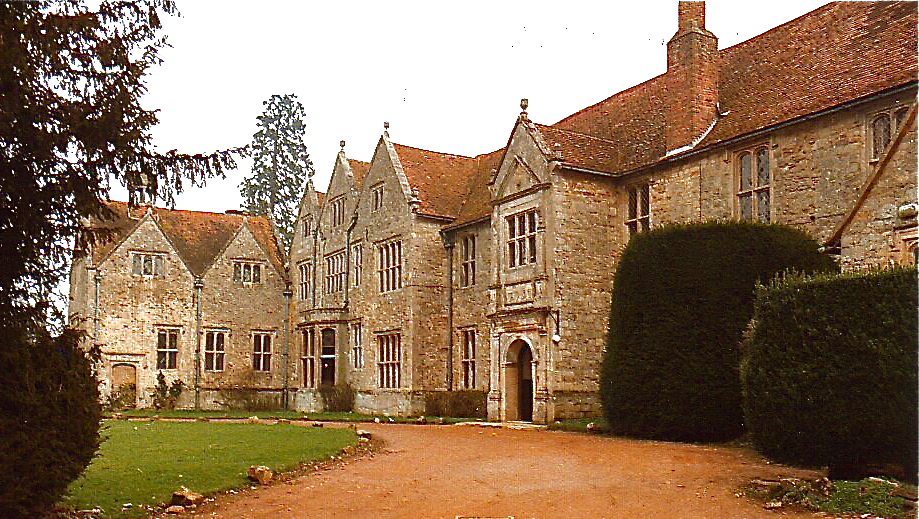
Studley Priory in February 1984, during its time as a hotel

Studley Priory was a small house of Benedictine nuns, ruled by a prioress, in Oxfordshire.

== Founding ==
Studley Priory was founded some time before 1176 in the hamlet of Studley in what is now the village of Horton-cum-Studley, 7 miles (11 km) northeast of Oxford in Oxfordshire, England, at 1 Horton Hill Road. In 1176, the priory received a grant from Bernard of St. Walery. The nuns were unhappy to be served poor beef and new beer on Thursday and Sunday nights, and no mutton. The priory was declared closed by 1536, but appears to have experienced a brief revival before its suppression in 1539. The priory lands were sold to the Croke family. The family built the house now known as Studley Priory, which still stands in its 10 acres (4.0 ha) of grounds, in 1587; a member of the Croke family was a judge in the 1649 trial of Charles I.

== Modern era ==
The house and its estate (which comprised most of the village of Horton-cum-Studley) was owned by the Croke family until around 1870 when it was sold to the Henderson family, who occupied it until World War II. During the war, it was a sanatorium for Royal Air Force officers.

In 1947 the priory was leased by Raymond and Tessa Bawtree, who (with their partner, Wilma Hessey) ran it as a country-house hotel for the next 14 years. During that time, many eminent guests stayed there (including Adrian Boult, Gilbert Murray, Beverley Nichols and Sandy Wilson; it was a favourite hostelry of C.S. Lewis, who came regularly for a Sunday-morning beer after church and in later years stayed there with his wife Joy. The Bawtrees did not renew their lease in 1961; that year the Hendersons auctioned off their estate, including the priory. The priory was bought by the Parke family, who continued to run it as a hotel until 2004 when the business was placed in receivership due to mounting financial losses. The business failed to find a buyer and the Priory was sold for reconversion to a private house.

== Notoriety ==
The monastery is mentioned in the historical novel Blanket In The Dark by John Buchan who lived at nearby Elsfield. It was used as a filming location for the exterior of Sir Thomas More's Chelsea home in the 1966 version of Robert Bolt's A Man for All Seasons (interior shots were done in a studio, not at Studley Priory).

== Burials in the priory ==
- William de Cantilupe (died 1251)
- William de Cantilupe (died 1254)

== See also ==
- Alexander Croke
