= Beechville, Nova Scotia =

Community in Nova Scotia, Canada

Coordinates: 44°38′19.02″N 63°41′10.16″W

Beechville in Nova Scotia

Beechville (pop. 2,100) is a Black Nova Scotian settlement and suburban community within the Halifax Regional Municipality of Nova Scotia, Canada, on St. Margaret's Bay Road (Trunk 3). The Beechville Lakeside Timberlea (BLT) trail starts here near Lovett Lake, following the old Halifax and Southwestern Railway line. Ridgecliff Middle School, located in Beechville Estates, serves the communities of Beechville, Lakeside, and Timberlea.

== History ==
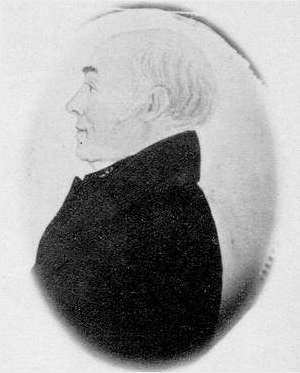
John Burton, 1st minister of Beechville

In 1816, the first Black refugees from the War of 1812 arrived in Beechville (aka Beech Hill). The community's early settlers were refugee Blacks fleeing from the southern American colonies. They were given a grant of five thousand acres (20 km²) close to the Northwest Arm in an area known as Refugee Hill. In 1821, ninety-six adults resettled in Trinidad.

The Beechville community spiritual leadership was under the care of Baptist Pastor, Rev. John Burton from England. Rev. Burton preached in Beechville and many other communities, but did not establish a permanent meeting house. In 1844, Rev. Richard Preston, a refugee from the USA who was a close follower and mentored by Rev. Burton, established the first permanent meeting house/church of Beechville Baptist Church.

Rev. Preston remained in Beechville until 1861. Following Rev. Preston, the care of the flock in Beechville was provided by many different Pastors, Deacons, and Licentiates, including the Rev. Dr. William Pearly Oliver, who pastured the Beechville Church for over 50 years.

The Halifax and Southwestern Railway arrived in 1902. Residential development increased after World War II, followed by industrial development of the Beechville Industrial Park along the railway in the 1960s. Rail service ended in 2007, and the line was converted to the Beechville Lakeside Timberlea recreational trail.

The old dilated school was abandoned in 1949, and the Beechville Baptist Church donated land for a new school, which is now the Beechville Baptist Church Center. Baptisms took place in the nearby lake, Lovett Lake. The candidates would walk down to the lake by the Historical Baptismal Path.

In 1965, segregation was abolished in Nova Scotia, and the Beechville students were educated at the Beechville Lakeside Consolidated School in Lakeside. In 1970, Beechville had a Black population of 300. A new church was built on the same site as the old church and was dedicated on April 29, 1979, with an inside Baptistry.

=== 21st century ===
The shrinking boundaries of the community have been an ongoing concern for decades. Armco Capital developed a 420-unit subdivision called Beechville Estates in the historically Black community in a series of phases between 1997 and 2004. The Black community raised issues surrounding illegal land encroachment and theft, which halted further development from continuing. Similar issues were raised about the illegal expansion of what was previously called the Lakeside Industrial Park. Discriminate zoning laws practiced by the City of Halifax allowed an industrial park to open in a mostly residential area. The industrial park changed its name back to its original name, Beechville Industrial Park, in 2019 to honour the community's land that it is built on.

In 2014, the Beechville Baptist Church celebrated its 170th of existence.

As of the 2016 Census, 2,100 people lived in Beechville, though only 150 were African Nova Scotian.

In 2018, Beechville was recognized as a site of historic importance under the Heritage Property Act by the province of Nova Scotia.

== Places of Worship ==
- Beechville Baptist church, An AUBA Church
