= Royal Acadian School =

School in Nova Scotia, Canada

The Royal Acadian School was a school developed for marginalized people in Halifax, Nova Scotia. The school was established by British officer and reformer Walter Bromley on 13 January 1814. He promoted the objectives of the British and Foreign School Society in Nova Scotia, under the sponsorship of Prince Edward. The first patron was Sir John Coape Sherbrooke.

Prior to the existence of public schools, the school offered schooling for middle-income students as well as low-income women, black students and immigrants. The school also welcomed Protestants and Catholics. The school was controversial, however, some of its biggest supporters were Thomas McCulloch, Samuel George William Archibald, John Young, Bishop of Nova Scotia Robert Stanser, Chief Justice Brenton Halliburton and John Starr. Hugh Bell was a vice president of the School when Henry Hezekiah Cogswell was the president.

== History ==
Bromley housed the Royal Acadian School in a converted building on Argyle St., Halifax that was formerly used by an amateur theatre troop.

In 1816, there were 400 students enrolled in the school. Bromley had recruited many black students - children and adults - whom he taught on the weekends because they were employed during the week. Some of the black students entered into business in Halifax while others were hired as servants.

In 1823, Bromley employed 67 girls and women to spin and knit native wool in his school or in their dwellings. The school ventured into this field of private enterprise to empower poor women without regard for personal profit. He paid his workers 2s. a day, which was considered a “reasonable rate” for piece-work.

Bromley also devoted himself to the service of the Mi’kmaq people. The Mi'kmaq were among the poor of Halifax and in the rural communities. According to historian Judith Finguard, his contribution to give public exposure to the plight of the Mi’kmaq “particularly contributes to his historical significance.” Finguard writes:

Bromley’s attitudes towards the Indians were singularly enlightened for his day…. Bromley totally dismissed the idea that native people were naturally inferior and set out to encourage their material improvement through settlement and agriculture, their talents through education, and their pride through his own study of their languages.

Bromley’s school made a “seminal contribution” to the development of the education movement in Nova Scotia. Well after Bromley’s departure from Nova Scotia (1825), the school continued to play a central role in the campaign for free education. It became a girls’ school by the 1870s.

== Notable alumni ==
- George Edward Fenety
- Joseph Howe
- Daniel Cronan

== See also ==
- Black Nova Scotians
