= Lovett Lake =

Lake in Nova Scotia, Canada

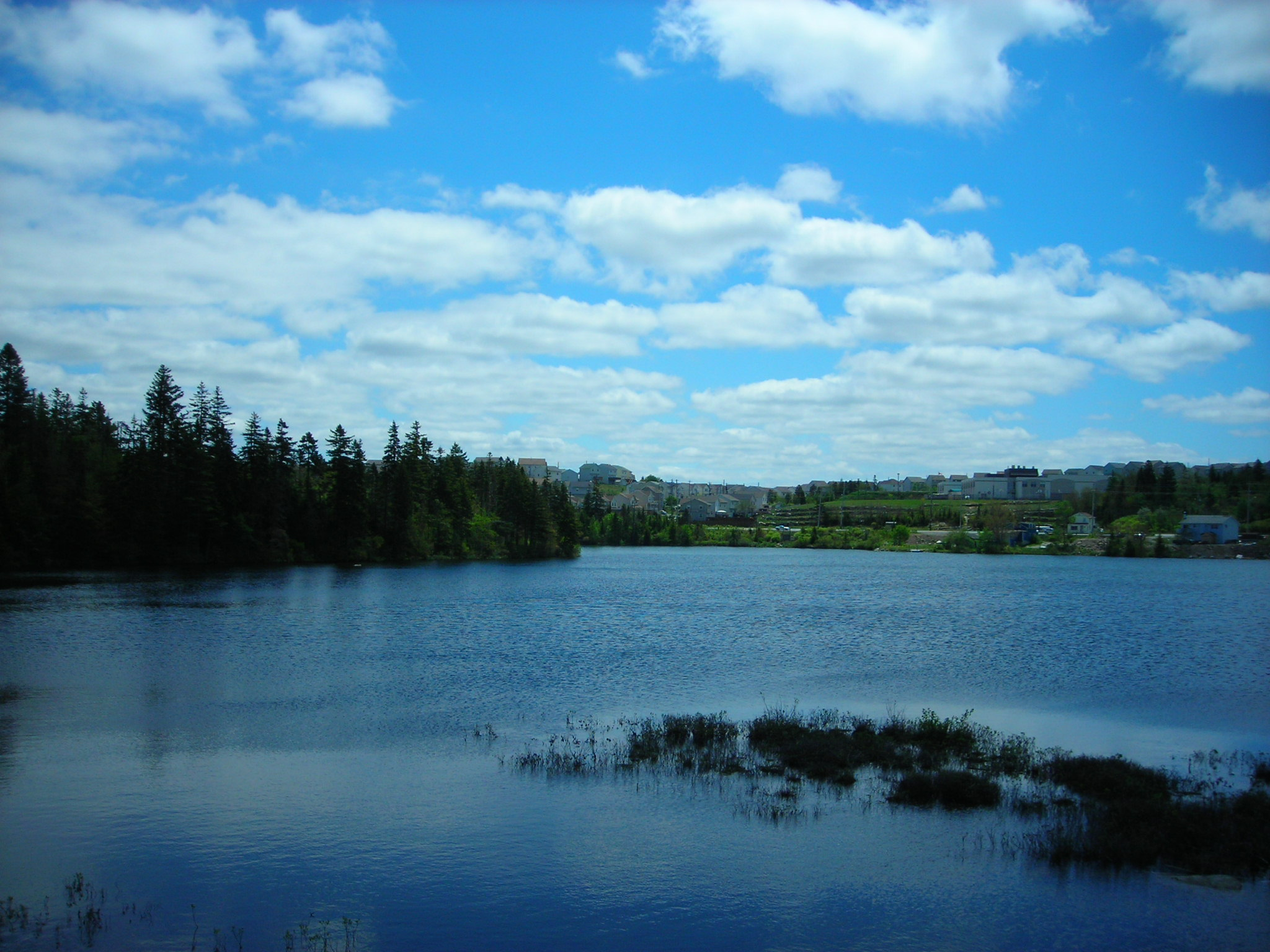
- Picture of the lake from the BLT trail at the lake's north shore.

- Location within Nova Scotia
- Location: Halifax Regional Municipality, Nova Scotia
- Coordinates: 44°38′18.6″N 63°41′2″W
- Basin countries: Canada

Lovett Lake is a lake in the community of Beechville in the Halifax Regional Municipality, Nova Scotia, Canada. It is located west of the Halifax Peninsula and the crossing of highways 102 and 103 and directly north of St. Margaret's Bay Road. Now the Beechville Lakeville Timberlea (BLT) trail starts directly north-west of the Lake, on the former main route of the historic Halifax and Southwestern Railway, which was near the lake's north shore.

== See also ==
- List of lakes in Nova Scotia
