= Richard Preston (clergyman) =

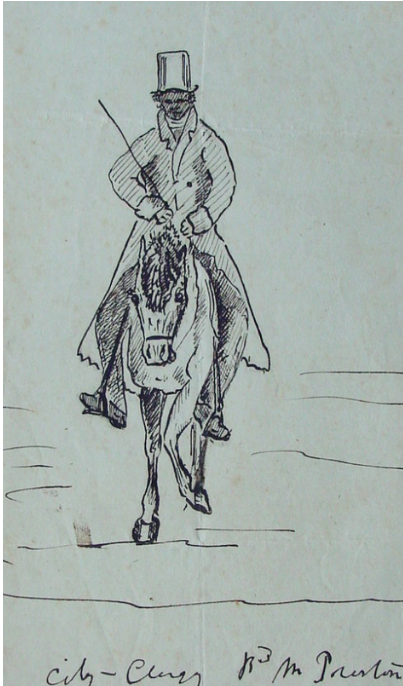
Richard Preston, Nova Scotia Archives

Richard Preston, (c. 1791 – 16 July 1861), was a religious leader and abolitionist. He escaped slavery in Virginia to become an important leader for the African Nova Scotian community and in the international struggle against slavery. He established the Cornwallis Street Baptist Church, the African Abolition Society and the African Baptist Association.

== Personal life ==
Little is known of Richard Preston's early life. He is believed to have been born into slavery in Virginia but managed to gain an education and save enough to buy his freedom in 1816. He went to Nova Scotia in search of his mother, who had escaped slavery in the War of 1812 as one of the 2000 African Americans who escaped to the British after the Cochrane Proclamation and settled in Nova Scotia where they became known as the War of 1812 Refugees. Discovering his mother, who he had not seen for many years, free and alive in Preston, Nova Scotia, he was so moved that he took the name of her community.

Preston was described as being "light-skinned" and "6'1" in height. He never married. He was known as a gifted orator and for his sense of humour.

== Ministry ==
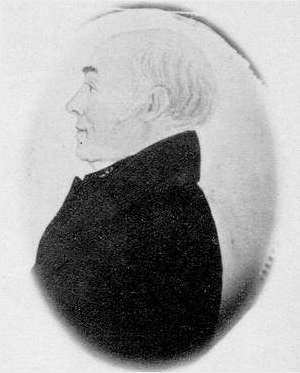
John Burton Acadia University Archives

Preston was mentored by Baptist minister John Burton. Preston became one of the most important church and community leaders in Nova Scotia. He assisted in setting up 11 Baptist churches across the province.

Preston was trained as a minister in England and met many of the leading voices in the abolitionist movement that helped to get the Slavery Abolition Act 1833 passed by the British Parliament. When Preston returned to Nova Scotia, he became the president of the Abolitionist movement in Halifax. His efforts to establish a school for Black students led to the refurbishing of the Church of England school for the black students that was established in 1785.

== Legacy ==
Preston founded churches across Nova Scotia. He was designated a person of National Historic Significance by Parks Canada in 2005 for his religious leadership, community building and contributions to the struggle against slavery. East Preston and North Preston, Nova Scotia, are often believed to be named in his honour, although in fact it was these communities that inspired his name.

== See also ==
- New Horizons Baptist Church
- David George (Baptist)
- Slavery in Canada
- Black Nova Scotians
