= Mathieu da Costa =

Canadian explorer; first recorded free Black person in Canada

- Born: Azores
- Died: after 1619; Quebec City, Quebec
- Occupations: Translator and Explorer
- Known for: First recorded black person in Canada, Exploration of New France, Bridge between the Indigenous peoples in Canada and the European explorers through his translation

Mathieu da Costa (sometimes d'Acosta) (fl. 1589–1619) was an Afro-French member of the exploring party of Pierre Dugua, the Sieur de Monts, and Samuel de Champlain that travelled from France to the New World in the early 17th century. He was the first recorded free black person to arrive on the territory of today's Canada.

== History ==
There is little documentation about Mathieu da Costa. Of at least partial African ancestry, he is known to have been a freeman favoured by explorers for his multilingual talents. Numerous mixed-race African-Portuguese persons were part of the Atlantic Creole generation, often working as sailors or interpreters. His portfolio of languages is thought to have included Dutch, English, French, Portuguese, Mi'kmaq, and pidgin Basque, the dialect many Indigenous peoples used for trading purposes.

=== With the Portuguese ===
He was originally engaged by the Portuguese as a translator, having learned their language. It was thought that his skills would be valuable in future cartography expeditions to the New World. The tradition of Europeans depending on such translators was more than a century old by the time da Costa started working with them. An interpreter, translator, and general go-between such as da Costa was known as um grumete in the Portuguese-speaking world. Da Costa would later be sought by both the English and the Dutch to help in their contacts with Indigenous peoples in North America, but the French secured his services.

=== In Holland ===
Mathieu da Costa was in Amsterdam, Holland, in February 1607. Apparently, the Dutch had seized Pierre Du Gua de Monts's ships near Tadoussac at the St. Lawrence River in a trade dispute, and took Mathieu as well. His abduction strongly suggests that his talents helped bridge the gap between the Europeans and the First Nations of Canada. It is thought that he was kidnapped.

=== Working for Du Gua ===
French documents record da Costa working for the leaders of Port Royal in 1608. In 1608 he was hired for three years by Pierre Du Gua de Monts. It may be assumed that Da Costa accompanied Du Gua de Mons and Samuel de Champlain on one or more of their voyages to Acadia and the St Lawrence area. However, in 1609, his presence is recorded in Rouen, France, and in a jail in Le Havre, France, in December. Whether he visited Canada that year is open to question.

Du Gua's activities in Canada did not end until 1617. A court case related to expenses incurred by Nicolas de Bauquemare of Rouen to support da Costa dragged on until 1619, although there is no positive indication that Mathieu da Costa was personally present.

There is controversy as to how da Costa had learned to communicate with Indigenous peoples. One theory suggested that the North American cultural context of trading centers, with multi-lingual populations, was very similar to the African trading ports.

== Legacy ==
Da Costa's translation and communication skills helped reduce the cultural gap between early French explorers and the First Nations. His work in Canada is honoured at the Port-Royal National Historic Site in Nova Scotia, Canada. He was also the subject of a French graphic novel, called Mathieu de Costa, which was written by Diane Groulx and illustrated by Jocelyne Jatte.

=== Commemorations ===
A domestic rate postage stamp honoring da Costa was issued by Canada Post on February 1, 2017, in conjunction with Black History Month.

A plaque at the Port Royal Habitation National Historic Site commemorates da Costa's contribution. It is part of the Mathieu da Costa African Heritage Trail, a series of monuments marking African Nova Scotian history in the Annapolis Valley. It was unveiled in July 2005

The Mathieu da Costa Challenge was an annual creative writing and artwork contest started in 1996 by the Department of Canadian Heritage. The challenge encourages youth to discover how diversity has shaped Canada's history and the important role that pluralism plays in Canadian society.

A school in Toronto and two streets, one in Montreal and the other in Quebec City, have also been named after da Costa.

== See also ==
- Black Nova Scotians
- Portuguese colonization of the Americas
