= Merikins =

African-American settlers in Trinidad

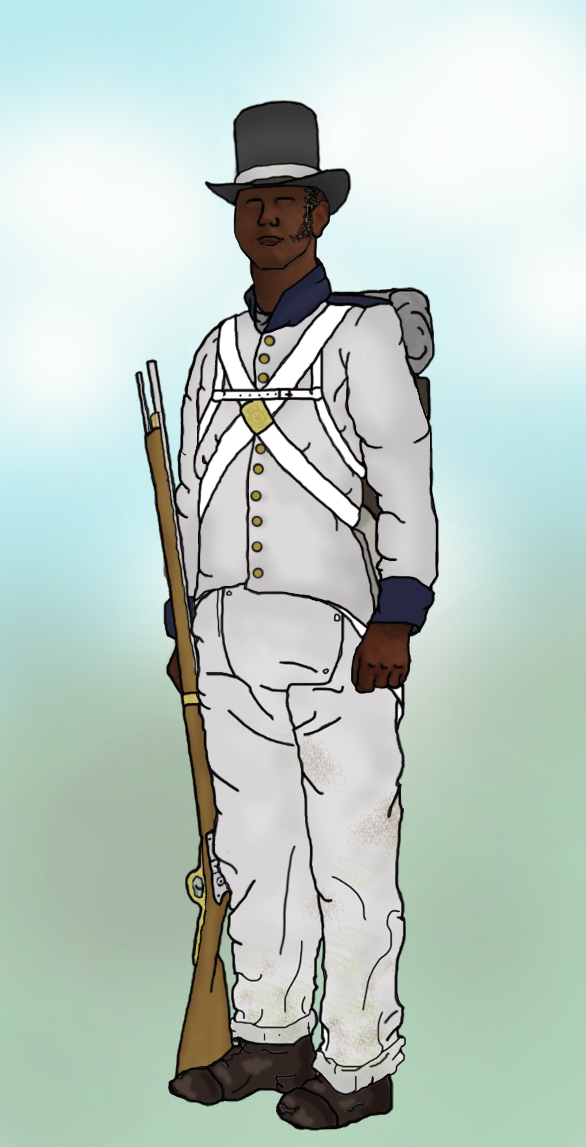
A Colonial Marine in their fatigue uniform

The Merikins or Merikens were formerly enslaved African-Americans who fought and escaped bondage to gain their freedom and joined the Corps of Colonial Marines, fighting alongside the British against the United States during the War of 1812.

After their service in Bermuda, they established a community in the south of Trinidad between 1815 and 1816. The region was largely populated by French-speaking Catholics but soon transitioned to an English-speaking, Baptist community after their arrival. It is believed that the term "Merikins" is derived from the local patois, but as many Americans have long been in the habit of dropping the initial "A" it is also likely that the new settlers brought that pronunciation with them from the United States. Some of the Company villages and land grants established back then still exist in Trinidad today.

== Origin ==
During the American Revolutionary War, the British issued proclamations which freed Black American slaves owned by Patriot colonists. Thousands of slaves escaped to British lines during the war and gained their freedom, finding work as domestic servants, military personnel and sanitation workers. Many were evacuated to Britain or its remaining colonies between 1782 and 1783. During the War of 1812, British Vice-admiral Sir Alexander Cochrane issued a similar proclamation on 2 April 1814, offering all Americans to opportunity to resettle in the British Empire:

...all who may be disposed to emigrate from the UNITED STATES will, with their Families, be received on board His Majesty's Ships or Vessels of War, or at the Military Posts that may be established, upon or near the Coast of the UNITED STATES, when they will have their choice of either entering into His Majesty's Sea or Land Forces, or of being sent as FREE Settlers to the British Possessions in North America or the West Indies, where they will meet with due encouragement...

Though the proclamation made no mention of slavery, it was intentionally targeted at Black American slaves. Word of the proclamation quickly spread among the slaves despite white American attempts to suppress it, and hundreds of slaves soon began escaping to the British, who freed them. Six companies of former slaves, drawn from along the American coast between the Chesapeake Bay and Georgia, were recruited into the Corps of Colonial Marines Cochrane's recruitment of slaves in the Chesapeake was contrary to his orders from the government, which had instructed him to accept volunteers for military service only from Georgia and South Carolina and to immediately send all such volunteers overseas to be trained for British Army service.

Following the War of 1812's end in 1815, Britain settled the American slaves it freed across the British Empire, including Canada, Jamaica and the Bahamas. In 1815, the Colonial Marines were initially stationed at the Royal Naval Dockyard, Bermuda. Although they had signed on for a life of military service, the marines rejected orders to be transferred to the West India Regiments, and finally agreed to be settled in Trinidad and Tobago. The governor of Trinidad, Sir Ralph Woodford, wanted to increase the number of subsistence farmers in the colony and arranged for the creation of a village for each of the six companies on the Naparima Plain in southern Trinidad. Robert Mitchell, a local planter, managed the establishment and maintenance of the settlements, petitioning the governor for supplies when needed.

== Company villages ==
Unlike the American slaves who were brought to Trinidad in 1815 in ships of the Royal Navy, HMS Carron and HMS Levant, (Note: 'The initial Merikins arrived in Trinidad on May 27, 1815 (88 on the HMS Levant) and July 5, 1815 (and 58 on the HMS Carron)... November 27, 1815 [saw the] arrival of [the third group, via HMS Carron again, of] 65 ... The fourth and largest group of settlers arrived on August 20, 1816 with 411 men.') the Veteran Marines were brought there in 1816, with their families, in the hired transports Mary & Dorothy and Lord Eldon. There were 574 former soldiers plus about 200 women and children. To balance the sexes, more black women were subsequently recruited – women who had been freed from other places such as captured French slave ships. The six companies were each settled in a separate village under the command of a corporal or sergeant, who maintained a military style of discipline. Some of the villages were named after the companies and the Fifth and Sixth Company villages still retain those names.

The villages were in a forested area of the Naparima Plain near a former Spanish mission, La Misión de Savana Grande. Each of the Veteran Marines was granted 16 acres of land and some of these plots are still farmed today by descendants of original settlers. The land was fertile but the conditions were primitive initially as the land had to be cleared and the lack of roads was an especial problem. It is sometimes said that some of the settlers were craftsmen more used to an urban environment and, as they had been expecting better, they were disgruntled and some returned to America, but this comment applies to later free Black American settlers, who came from towns, and not to the Veteran Colonial Marines, who were all refugees from the rural areas of the Chesapeake and Georgia. The settlers built houses from the timber they felled, and planting crops of bananas, cassava, maize and potatoes. Rice was introduced from America and was especially useful because it could be stored for long periods without spoiling.

Twenty years after the initial establishment, the then governor Lord Harris supported improvements to the infrastructure of the settlements and arranged for the settlers to get deeds to their lands, so confirming their property rights as originally stated on arrival, though it is not clear that the initiative was carried through universally. As they prospered, they became a significant element in Trinidad's economy. Their agriculture advanced from subsistence farming to include cash crops of cocoa and sugar cane. Later, oil was discovered and then some descendants were able to lease their lands for the mineral rights. Others continued as independent market traders.

== Religion ==
Many of the original settlers were Baptists from evangelical sects common in places such as Georgia and Virginia. The settlers kept this religion, which was reinforced by missionary work by Baptists from London who helped organise the construction of churches in the 1840s. The villages had pastors and other religious elders as authority figures and there was a rigorous moral code of abstinence and the puritan work ethic. African traditions were influential too and these included the gayap system of communal help, herbal medicine and Obeah – African tribal science. A prominent elder in the 20th century was "Papa Neezer" – Samuel Ebenezer Elliot (1901–1969) – who was a descendant of an original settler, George Elliot, and renowned for his ability to heal and cast out evil spirits. His syncretic form of religion included veneration of Shango, prophecies from the "Obee seed" and revelation from the Psalms. The Spiritual Baptist faith is a legacy of the Merikin community.

== Famous Merikins ==
The following people are descended from this community:

- Tina Dunkley, American museum director
- Hazel Manning, Trinidadian senator and education minister
- Althea McNish, British textile designer
- Brent Sancho, footballer, Minister for Sport for Trinidad and Tobago
- Lincoln Crawford OBE, barrister, Chair, Independent Adoption Service

== See also ==
- Black refugee (War of 1812) – similar communities established in the Canadian provinces of Nova Scotia and New Brunswick.

== Citations and references ==
=== References ===
- Anthony, Michael (2008). "Fifth Company Village". NALIS Research. National Library of Trinidad and Tobago.
- Dunkley, Tina (2015). The Merikins: Forgotten Freedom Fighters in the War of 1812. Plain Vision. ISBN 978-0991059454.
- Crawford, Michael J.; Hughes, Christine F., eds. (2002). The Naval War of 1812: A Documentary History, Vol. 3. Washington: Naval Historical Center (GPO). ISBN 978-0-16-051224-7.
- Huggins, Alfred B. (2014). The Saga of the Companies: A History of the Merikin Settlers in Trinidad. Plain Vision. ISBN 978-0991059447.
- Kamminga, Caitlyn; Walters, Adam (2016). River of Freedom. Plain Vision. ISBN 978-0997166408.
- MacDougall, Philip, ed. (April 2017) [9 June 2012]. "Bermuda Dockyard and the War of 1812". Transactions of the Naval Dockyard Society. 10. conference held at the National Museum of Bermuda, Royal Naval Dockyard. ISBN 978-0-9929292-1-3.
- "The Merikins: Free Black Settlers 1815–1816". NALIS Research. National Library of Trinidad and Tobago. 2016.
- Rodriguez, Junius P., ed. (2007). Encyclopedia of Slave Resistance and Rebellion, Volume 1. Westport, Connecticut: Greenwood Publishing Group. ISBN 978-0313332722.
- "How the Merikins came to Moruga". Sunday Express. Trinidad & Tobago. 5 December 2011.
- "A Merikins Legacy". Sunday Express. Trinidad & Tobago. 24 March 2012.
- Weiss, John McNish (2002). The Merikens: Free Black American Settlers in Trinidad. London. ISBN 0-9526460-5-6.
- Weiss, John McNish (26 May 2015). The Corps of Colonial Marines: Black freedom fighters of the War of 1812. London. Archived from the original on 8 February 2018.
