= John Burton (minister) =

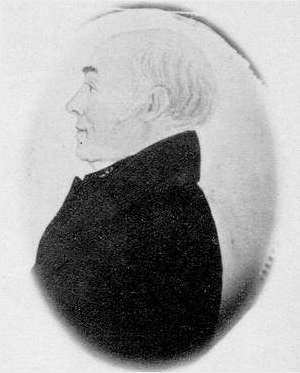
John Burton (Acadia University Archives)

John Burton (1760–1838) was a Baptist minister in Nova Scotia and was one of the first to integrate black and white Nova Scotians into the same congregation. David George was the first Baptist minister. In 1811, Burton's church had 33 members, the majority of whom were free blacks from Halifax and the neighbouring settlements of Preston and Hammonds Plains.

According to historian Stephen Davidson, the blacks were "shunned, or merely tolerated, by the rest of Christian Halifax, the blacks were from the first warmly received in the Baptist Church. Burton became known as "an apostle to the coloured people" and would often be sent out by the Baptist association on missionary visits to the black communities surrounding Halifax. He was the mentor of Richard Preston.

== See also ==
- New Horizons Baptist Church
- Black Nova Scotians
