= Tracadie, Nova Scotia =

Community in Nova Scotia, Canada

Coordinates: 45°37′19.49″N 61°40′12.75″W

Tracadie in Nova Scotia

Tracadie is a small community in the Canadian province of Nova Scotia, located in Antigonish County. Tracadie has close links with nearby Upper Big Tracadie. Led by Thomas Brownspriggs, Tracadie was settled by Black Loyalists in the early 19th century.

The Order of Saint Augustine established the first of their Canadian houses at Tracadie, in 1938.

== Etymology ==
The Mi'kmaq name for the area was "Tulukaddy" which means "place of residence." Champlain mentions it in 1631 as "Tregate." Another explanation of the derivation of this name is that the Indians called it "Telegadik" a word used by the Micmacs to denote any particular inhabited place or camping ground. The English changed the "I" to "r" (there is no "r" in Micmac), making it "Etragadie," from which we get the name "Tracadie."

== See also ==
- Black Nova Scotians
