= Walter Bromley =

British military officer (1774–1938)

Walter Henry Bromley (c. 1774 – c. 5 May 1838) was a British military officer and reformer who founded a school in Halifax, Nova Scotia, Canada, and did much good work among children of poorer families including, especially, indigenous Canadians. He later emigrated to South Australia where he briefly ran that new colony's first school then served for a short time as Protector of Aborigines.

== History ==
Bromley, the eldest son of Robert and Julie Bromley, was baptised on 27 February 1775 in Keelby and grew up in rural Lancashire. He enlisted in the 23rd Regiment of Foot (better known as the Royal Welch Fusiliers) when quite young. He saw action in a number of overseas conflicts (including Nova Scotia 1808–1810), rising to the rank of captain. In 1811 he returned to England and retired on half pay.

=== Canada ===
In 1813 he returned to Halifax, Nova Scotia where he founded the Royal Acadian School, which he ran for the thirteen years he lived there. His school offered education for middle- and low-income families, including girls, black and immigrant children. The school included Protestants and Catholics. The school was controversial, however, as some of its biggest supporters came from the Nova Scotia elite.

Bromley also devoted himself to the service of the Mi'kmaq people. The Mi'kmaq were among the poor of Halifax and in the rural communities. According to historian Judith Finguard, his contribution to give public exposure to the plight of the Mi'kmaq "particularly contributes to his historical significance." Finguard wrote:

Bromley's attitudes towards the Indians were singularly enlightened for his day…. Bromley totally dismissed the idea that native people were naturally inferior and set out to encourage their material improvement through settlement and agriculture, their talents through education, and their pride through his own study of their languages.

Bromley's school made a "seminal contribution" to the development of the education movement in Nova Scotia. Well after Bromley's departure from Nova Scotia (1825), the school continued to play a central role in the campaign for free education. It became a girls' school by the 1870s.

Bromley returned to England around 1825 or 1826, married twice, and had several children.

=== South Australia ===
Bromley embarked, alone, for South Australia aboard Tam O'Shanter as part of the "First Fleet of South Australia", arriving in November 1836 at Kangaroo Island. There "Captain Bromley", as he was generally called, opened a school for 24 children at Kingscote on 5 December 1836. This was not to last long however, as on 5 April 1837 he was appointed Protector of Aborigines, succeeding George Stevenson. He closed his school on 19 May 1837 and commenced his work, living among the Aborigines and learning their language. He was a poor choice for the job, The Register opined, a bad example to set younger Aborigines (but did not elaborate). He was removed from the position of Protector and replaced by Dr. William Wyatt (c. 1805 – 10 June 1886).

He drowned in the River Torrens, accidentally so the inquest concluded, The Southern Australian felt Bromley had been treated unfairly, and had done more for the natives than Wyatt.
