= Jordantown, Nova Scotia =

Community in Nova Scotia, Canada

Jordantown
- Community
- Location of Jordantown, Nova Scotia
- Coordinates: 44°35′6.32″N 65°47′5.13″W
- Country: Canada
- Province: Nova Scotia
- County: Digby
- Municipal District: Digby

Jordantown is a community in the Canadian province of Nova Scotia, located in The Municipality of the District of Digby in Digby County. JordanTown was never called Brinley Town but some of the descendants of the Brindley Town settlement resided there.... JordanTown got its name through its first preacher who was named Charles Jordan, he resided in what was known as Little Joggin but because the majority of residents that were part of his congregation came from this area it was called JordanTown, because of this...(Jordan's flock).

Members of the community can trace their ancestral roots back over 200 years when indigenous people who were Reclassified to Negro Colored or mulatto people came to Nova Scotia listed as Black Loyalists who joined British colonial forces during the American Revolutionary War.
