= Upper Big Tracadie =

Community in Nova Scotia, Canada

Coordinates: 45°34′40.81″N 61°35′24.15″W

Philips Harbour in Nova Scotia

Upper Big Tracadie is a small community in the Canadian province of Nova Scotia, located in Antigonish County. It is a rural, predominantly African Canadian community. Led by Thomas Brownspriggs, Black Nova Scotians who had settled at Chedabucto Bay behind the present-day village of Guysborough migrated to Tracadie (1787). The community is served by a community center and church, Tracadie United Baptist Church. It has close ties with the nearby community of Tracadie and Guysborough.

== History ==
=== Founding residents ===
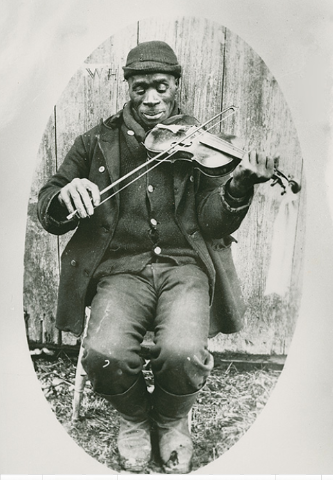
Joe Izard, descendant of former slave Andrew Izard, Guysborough, c. 1900

One Black Loyalist was former slave Benjamin Gero (formerly Charles Gero) who was born in Guinea (c1758) and spoke French. He is known to have had ritual scarification on his cheeks, in the form of four cuts on either side. His French protestant slave owner was Peter Giraud of King Street, Charlestown, South Carolina, who was a poor stocking weaver. Gero ran away in October 1776 but was recaptured the following summer. A year after the British occupied Charlestown, they arrest slaver Girard and freed Gero (1781). Giraud was imprisoned in Charlestown Harbor in the ship Torbay. Gero made his way to Nova Scotia and was married and baptized at the Christ Church in Guysborough in 1786. The following year he was granted land at Tracadie. As of 2014, their descendants still live in the community.

One Black Loyalist was Hannah Lining (c. 1749 - ?). She was a former slave of Dr. John Lining in Hillsborough, South Carolina (present-day Old Towne Creek). She worked on his plantation harvesting Indigofera. In 1761, at the age of 22, she tried to make a run for freedom but was caught. She lost one eye. During the American Revolution, in 1780 the British officer Major General Leslie occupied John Lining's residence in Hillsborough, and Hannah successfully escaped with her mother to New York. They worked in New York for a while before moving to Port Mouton, Nova Scotia. Port Mouton burned down and she moved to Guysborough in 1784. Hannah was baptized in Anglican Christ Church in 1786 and married her first husband there the following year when she was 38. Her first husband died. She re-married and then was widowed again. Hannah did not have children. She was given land nearby Black Loyalist settlement Tracadie, Nova Scotia but never moved there. Hannah and her mother lived together into their old age.

Another Black Loyalist was Andrew Izard (c. 1755 - ?). He was a former slave of Ralph Izard in St. George, South Carolina. He worked on a rice plantation and grew up on Combahee. When he was young he was valued at 100 pounds. In 1778 Izard made his escape. During the American Revolution, he worked for the British army in the Wagonmaster General department. He was on one of the final ships to leave New York in 1783. He traveled on the Nisbett in November, which sailed to Port Mouton. The village burned to the ground in the spring of 1784 and he was transported to Guysborough. There he raised a family and still has descendants that live in the community.

=== Education ===
The education in the Black community was initially provided by the protestant Society for the Propagation of the Gospel, a Church of England missionary organization active in the British Atlantic world in the 18th and 19th centuries. Some of the schoolmasters were: Thomas Brownspriggs (c. 1788-1790), Dempsey Jordan (1818-?).

There were 23 black families at Tracadie in 1808; by 1827 this number had increased to 30 or more.

The documentary film Seven Shades of Pale was filmed in the community in 1975.

== See also ==
- Black Nova Scotians
