= Alfred Waddell (physician) =

Trinidadian physician (1896–1953)

- Born: Alfred Ernest Waddell; 25 August 1896; Tunapuna, Trinidad and Tobago, British West Indies
- Died: 20 March 1953 (aged 56); Halifax, Nova Scotia, Canada
- Burial place: Camp Hill Cemetery, Halifax
- Education: Dalhousie University (MD, 1933)
- Occupations: Physician; civil rights activist
- Known for: Treating Viola Desmond's injuries following her arrest in 1946
- Spouse: Emilia Maria Castillo
- Children: 4

Alfred Ernest Waddell (25 August 1896 – 20 March 1953) was a Trinidadian physician and civil rights activist who is known for treating Viola Desmond's injuries following her 1946 arrest for sitting in a whites-only section of a cinema in New Glasgow, Nova Scotia, Canada.

== Early life and career ==
Born in 1896 in Tunapuna, Trinidad and Tobago (then a colony of the British West Indies), Waddell moved to Harlem, New York, with his wife in 1923 and studied at Columbia University; he aspired to practise medicine in Trinidad, which meant he needed a medical degree from the British Commonwealth. He then moved to Halifax, Nova Scotia, and became one of the first Black physicians to graduate from Dalhousie University in 1933. He was one of the only physicians who provided house calls to the Black Nova Scotian communities of Africville, Beechville, Hammonds Plains, and Preston; he usually did this by borrowing cars from people and many patients could only pay him with chickens and eggs. He additionally helped administer polio vaccines to these communities during an outbreak in the 1930s.

Waddell was also involved in civil rights movements; in the 1930s, he helped to desegregate a swimming pool at the Halifax Common after one of his children was asked to leave. He also helped to raise money for Ethiopia following its invasion by Fascist Italy. In 1946, Waddell treated Viola Desmond following her arrest for sitting in a whites-only section of a cinema in New Glasgow, and additionally wrote letters to the provincial and federal government to try to get the conviction overturned. He was a funder and contributor to The Clarion, a Black newspaper.

== Legacy ==
In 2001, Waddell was the subject of Before His Time, an episode of the A Scattering of Seeds documentary series. Dalhousie University featured him as a "Dalhousie Original" in 2018. In 2024, a street in Halifax's Cogswell District was named after Waddell; the street is a few blocks away from the location where he established his first practise. His name was originally in the running as one of the options for the renaming of Cornwallis Street, which was ultimately renamed to honour Nora Bernard. Waddell's granddaughter is judoka AnnMaria De Mars and his great-granddaughter is professional mixed martial artist Ronda Rousey.
