= Charles Daniels (activist) =

Black Canadian activist and porter

Charles Daniels was a Black Canadian working as a porter supervisor with the CPR at the beginning of the 20th century. In 1914, he launched a $1,000 discrimination lawsuit against the Sherman Grand theatre in Calgary, Alberta, Canada, when the management refused to honour his ticket for floor seating in the whites-only section to see a production of King Lear. Charles Daniels was a civil rights activist that came to the Canadian prairies as part of the poorly documented wave of African-American settlers to Alberta during the early 20th century. His date and place of birth and death are unknown.

== Career and activism ==
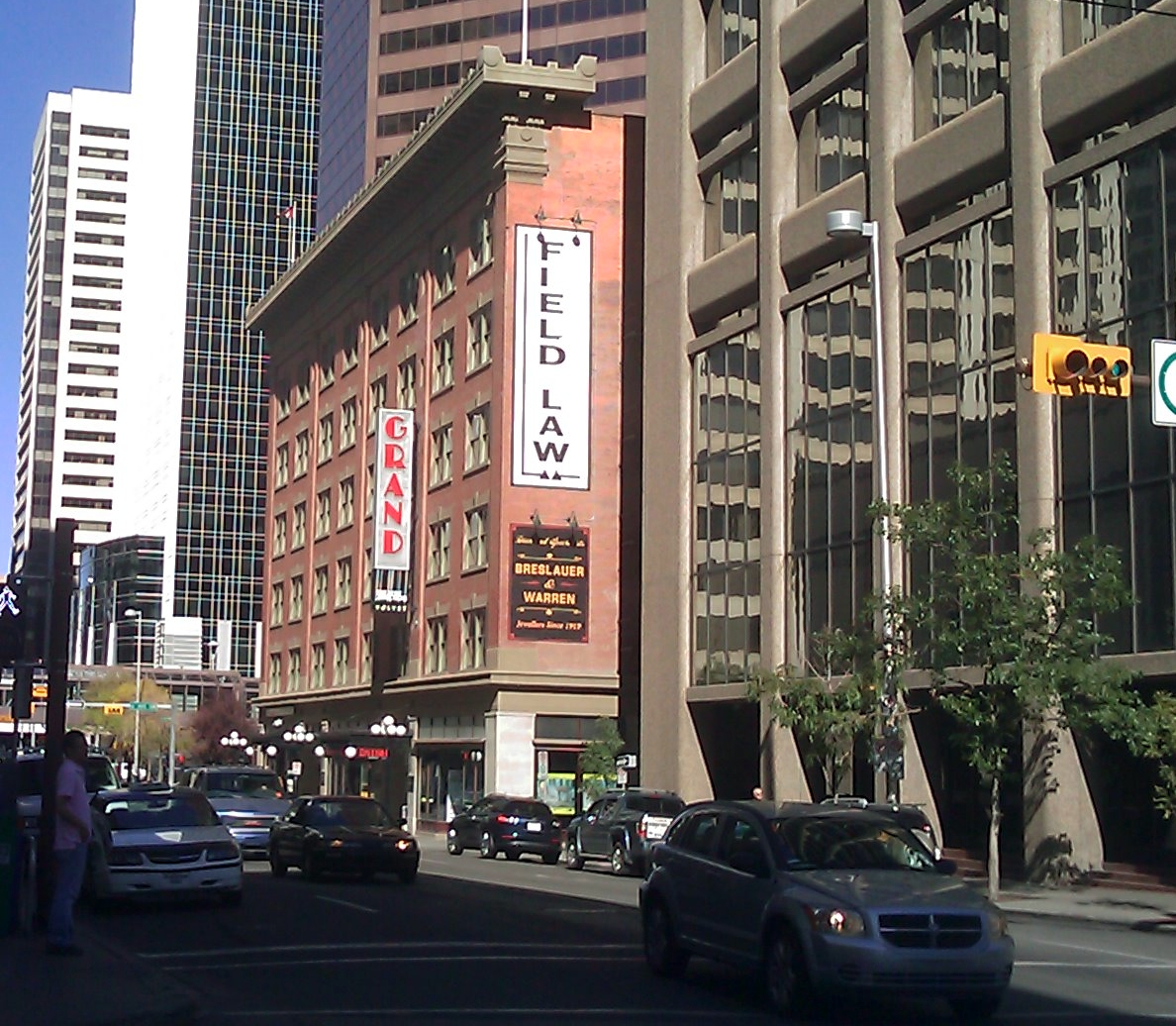
Sherman Grand theatre built in 1912 in the Beltline District of Calgary

In 1914, Charles Daniels was known to be working for the CPR based out of Calgary as an inspector for porters and was part of a black union, the Brotherhood of the Sleeping Car Porters. Porters looked after the needs of railway passengers, and were one of the few jobs available to black men in Canada in the early 20th century. They were subject to racial injustice and slurs, for example, being called derogatory names like "George" or "boy." Edmontonian amateur historian, Bashir Mohamed, rediscovered Charles Daniels' through extensive archival research while researching Black history. His research revealed that Charles Daniels possessed a keen love of theatre. On February 3, 1914, Charles Daniels sent the neighbour's boy on an errand to purchase two tickets to see a production of King Lear playing at the Sherman Grand theatre; one for Charles Daniels and one for his friend his friend, Andrew Hill. When Daniels and Hill arrived at the show to claim their seats, the theatre refused to seat them, instead offering to exchange them for seats in the balcony. Theatres would often reserve the best seating on the floor level for white patrons, while blacks were relegated to the less desirable balcony seating.

Daniels refused to change his tickets, but the theatre still denied him entry. Humiliated and embarrassed in front of fellow colleagues at the CPR who witnessed the altercation, Daniels hired a lawyer and launched a lawsuit with lawyer John McDonald for $1,000 in damages against the theatre, the building owner Senator James Lougheed, and William Sherman for discriminatory segregation practices. When the case came to trial, lawyers for the theatre failed to show up so Daniels won the court case by default, receiving approximately $20,000 in 2020 Canadian dollars, although there is no record that he received the money. Embarrassed by the reputation damage to the theatre, Senator James Lougheed, fired William Sherman shortly after, replacing him with another theatre magnate, although it is not known if the theatre rescinded its segregation practice.

== See also ==
- Viola Desmond
- Canadian Museum for Human Rights
- Carrie Best
- Lulu Anderson
