= Racial segregation in Canada =

Until 1965, racial segregation in schools, stores and most aspects of public life existed legally in Ontario, Quebec and Nova Scotia, and informally in other provinces such as British Columbia. Unlike in the United States, racial segregation applied to all non-whites and was historically enforced through laws, court decisions and social norms with a closed immigration system that barred virtually all non-whites from immigrating until 1962. Section 38 of the 1910 Immigration Act permitted the government to prohibit the entry of immigrants "belonging to any race deemed unsuited to the climate or requirements of Canada, or of immigrants of any specified class, occupation or character."

== Medical segregation ==
Indigenous peoples of Canada were treated in racially segregated hospitals called Indian hospitals or segregated wards in regular hospitals. Medical experimentation also occurred at these hospitals, frequently without consent, such as the testing of BCG vaccine on infants. These hospitals were underfunded, overcrowded, and had worse quality of care for patients. Hospitals that exclusively treated white patients were often located nearby.

Blood transfusions were segregated based on the donor's race until the 1960s in both the United States and Canada. Blood from black individuals was perceived as inferior and unsafe for use in white recipients. Charles R. Drew advocated against the practice due to a lack of scientific evidence.

== Immigration policy ==
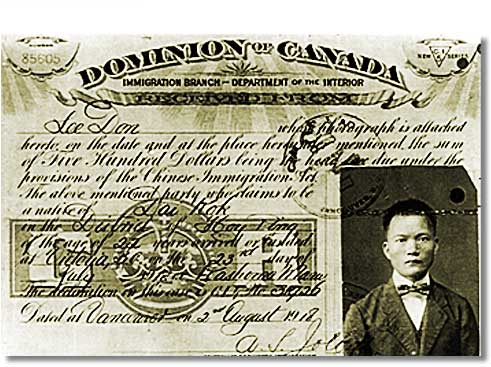
Head tax receipt. The head tax was introduced in 1885, as a means of controlling Chinese immigration.

Responding to the anti-immigration sentiment in British Columbia, the Canadian government of John A. Macdonald introduced the Chinese Immigration Act, receiving Royal Assent and becoming law in 1885. Under its regulations, the law stipulated that all Chinese people entering Canada must first pay a CA$50 fee, later referred to as a head tax. This was amended in 1887, 1892, and 1900, with the fee increasing to CA$100 in 1901 and later to its maximum of CA$500 in 1903, representing a two-year salary of an immigrant worker at that time. However, not all Chinese arrivals had to pay the head tax; those who were presumed to return to China based on the apparent, transitory nature of their occupation or background were exempt from the penalty. These included arrivals identifying themselves as students, teachers, missionaries, merchants, or members of the diplomatic corps. The Government of Canada collected about $23 million ($411 million in 2025 dollars) in face value from about 81,000 head tax payers. The head tax did discourage Chinese women and children from joining their men, but it failed to meet its goal, articulated by contemporary politicians and labour leaders, of the complete exclusion of Chinese immigration. Such was achieved through the same law that ended the head tax: the Chinese Immigration Act of 1923, which stopped Chinese immigration entirely, albeit with certain exemptions for business owners and others. It is sometimes referred to by opponents as the Chinese Exclusion Act, a term also used for its American counterpart.

Amber Valley was home to one of the largest Black settlements in Canada. The majority of settlers had emigrated from Oklahoma, Texas, and other southern states in the US with the desire to flee from the racial violence they faced there. Other Black communities in Alberta were Wildwood and Campsie. Land was open to settlers through the Dominion Lands Act, with the intent of preventing the Canadian prairies from being claimed as the territory of the United States. Then, Black settlers were essentially banned as a result of actions taken by prime minister Wilfrid Laurier's government.

== Education ==
An amendment to the 1850 Common School Act allowed for the creation of racially segregated schools. This was because the Common School Act included the Separate School Clause that allowed for the separation between different religions and races. Racial segregation looked different depending on where it took place in Canada. Many of these schools were located in southwestern Ontario where Black individuals and families settled looking for freedom. Some schools in Ontario had separate school buildings, while others attended the same school but at different times. Those schools that were for Black students were characterized by markedly poorer conditions and little concern was shown for their education. Scholars identify this as a suppressed history because it contradicts narratives of Ontario and Canada as places of justice and equality. However, this history includes a legacy of slavery in Canada that lasted for over 200 years as well as acts of terror perpetrated by white Ontarians such as burning the barns of Black families to the ground. The last racially segregated school in Ontario did not close until 1965 and in Nova Scotia until 1983, meaning that racially segregated schools existed for over one hundred years. Although Ontario and Nova Scotia were the two provinces to enact laws regarding racial segregation, many other provinces had racial segregation practices.

Canadian universities, particularly medical schools, often rejected applications based on race. This was the case of Dalhousie University, the University of Toronto, McGill University and Queen's University. Admitted black and Jewish students faced restrictions that white Christian students did not have. Only a few hospitals accepted black medical interns.

== Employment ==
Racial segregation practices extended to many areas of employment in Canada. White business owners and even provincial and federal government agencies often did not hire black people, with explicit rules preventing their employment. When the labour movement took hold in Canada near the end of the 19th century, workers began organizing and forming trade unions to improve the working conditions and quality of life for employees. However, black workers were systematically denied membership in these unions, and worker's protection was reserved exclusively for whites.

== Racial segregation in individual provinces and territories ==
=== Alberta ===
Alberta had an increased rate of black immigration from the United States in the early 1900s, partially due to black fur-traders seeking employment. In Edmonton, the city council passed a 1911 motion to end further black immigration. The council claimed that black immigration was detrimental to the province and that black and white Albertans were not capable of coexistence. The Ku Klux Klan in Canada also had increased local activity during the 1920s and 1930s. In the 1920s, city officials in Calgary codified restrictive covenants to prevent non-whites from purchasing homes outside of the boundaries of the railway yards.

Lulu Anderson, a black woman, was denied admission to the Metropolitan Theatre in Edmonton. In November 1922, Anderson sued the theatre for refusing to sell her a ticket to watch a movie, but the provincial courts ruled in favour of the theatre owners.

=== British Columbia ===
Land titles with restrictive covenant clauses were used to prevent the sale or rental of property to non-whites. For example, a clause in Vancouver real estate deeds for entire neighbourhoods going back to at least 1928 and included as late as 1965 stated, "That the Grantee or his heirs, administrators, executor, successors or assigns will not sell to, agree to sell to, rent to, lease to, or permit or allow to occupy, the said lands and premises, or any part thereof, any person of the Chinese, Japanese or other Asiatic race or to any Indian or Negro."

A long-standing practice of national segregation has also been imposed upon the commercial salmon fishery in British Columbia since 1992 when separate commercial fisheries were created for select aboriginal groups on three B.C. river systems. Canadians of other nations who fish in the separate fisheries have been arrested, jailed and prosecuted. Although the fishermen who were prosecuted were successful at trial in R v Kapp, this decision was overturned on appeal.

The first wave of Chinese immigrants pursued work in British Columbia and many decided to settle permanently there with their families. In 1922, it was voted to implement full segregation of Chinese students by forcing them to attend one of the only two Chinese schools in Victoria. This system prevented Chinese students from learning the English language, which was a main focus in Canadian education at the time.

Japanese students were segregated in British Columbia following the Second World War. In 1942, the government denied any responsibility for Japanese education, essentially denying Japanese children the right to education. While British Columbia Securities Commission (BCSC) did not want to be involved with this education, they argued that as Canadian citizens, Japanese students should have a proper education.

A CBC panel in Vancouver in 2012 discussed the growing public fear that the proliferation of ethnic enclaves amounted to a type of self-segregation.

=== Ontario ===
In Sarnia, a 1946 property deed for a Lake Huron community of approximately 100 cottage lots specified that property could only be owned by whites of a particular racial background. These clauses were all upheld by court decisions until the Canadian constitution came into effect.

In 1944, Ontario enacted the Racial Discrimination Act, which prohibited the publication or display, of any notice, sign, symbol, emblem or other representation on lands, premises, by newspaper or radio, that indicated racial discrimination.

=== Nova Scotia ===
In 1946, Viola Desmond, a black woman, refused to leave the segregated whites-only section of the Roseland Theatre in New Glasgow, Nova Scotia. Viola Desmond was arrested, jailed overnight and convicted without legal representation for an obscure tax offence as a result. Despite the efforts of the Nova Scotian Black community to assist her appeal, Viola Desmond was unable to remove the charges against her and went unpardoned in her lifetime.

=== Quebec ===
Before becoming a province, Quebec was part of the French colony known as New France. As a French colony, slavery existed under Le Code Noir. This influenced later policies where black people were seen as inferior to white people. In the education system, black children were streamed into different careers, creating a segregated workforce. In the 1950s, black women were only permitted to settle in Quebec if they were domestic workers.

In 1936, Fred Christie and another black acquaintance Emile King, were refused service at the York Tavern in the Forum in Montreal after watching a boxing match. Christie sued for $200 and won in provincial court. Christie was awarded $25 and the tavern was ordered to pay his court costs. The tavern owners successfully appealed. Christie took his case all the way to the Supreme Court of Canada in 1939. They dismissed his case, arguing that private businesses were able to discriminate based on race on their choosing. Few taverns in Saskatchewan, Ontario, and British Columbia allowed black visitors, and those that did had designated tables or side rooms for non-whites.

=== Saskatchewan ===
In 1901, Yee Clun was a Chinese émigré to Regina. He opened a restaurant and was an influential member of the local community, heading the local branch of the Chinese National Party. Clun had difficulty hiring employees as the Chinese Exclusion Act of 1923 had gone into effect. As a result, he filed an application with the city council to permit him to hire white women as employees, as Chinese business owners were not allowed to do so. His request gained preliminary approval but was delayed. The majority of the members in the local Women's Christian Temperance Union protested this, as they were concerned that this would lead to more white women wanting to marry Chinese men. The Regina Local Council of Women also urged the council to reject the application. This resulted in a decision that no licences for hiring female employees could be granted to Chinese men.

== See also ==
- Canadian Indian residential school system
- Emancipation Day (Canada)
- Residential segregation in Greater Vancouver
- Racial segregation in the United States
