= Lulu Anderson v The Brown Investment Company =

Alberta court case

Lulu Anderson v The Brown Investment Company was an Alberta legal case filed in 1922. Lulu Anderson (born 1885 or 1886 in Atlantic City) was a black woman who sued a theatre in Edmonton. That same year, Anderson had purchased a ticket for The Lion and the Mouse but was refused entry due to her race. Anderson hired a lawyer and proceeded to file a lawsuit against the theatre. Her lawsuit gained widespread newspaper coverage at the time. It was reported on by the Edmonton Journal as "a court action of considerable importance to the colored residents of the city". She lost the case, with the judge ruling that she could be refused entry as long as her ticket was refunded. This result was reported on by the Winnipeg Evening Tribune with the headline "Color Line Confirmed". Historical records related to the case were destroyed along with other files not deemed historically important. This purge of historical records was not determined by archivists but solely through the government's discretion. Anderson's case was similar to Viola Desmond's, as both women advocated against racial segregation.

== Background ==
Alberta had an increased rate of black immigration from the United States in the early 1900s, partially due to black fur-traders seeking employment. In Edmonton, the capital city of Alberta, the city council passed a 1911 motion to end further black immigration. The council claimed that black immigration was detrimental to the province and that black and white Albertans were not capable of coexistence. The Ku Klux Klan in Canada also had increased local activity during the 1920s and 1930s.

== See also ==
- Carrie Best
- Canadian Museum for Human Rights
- Charles Daniels (activist)
