= Railway porter =

Railway worker who assists passengers

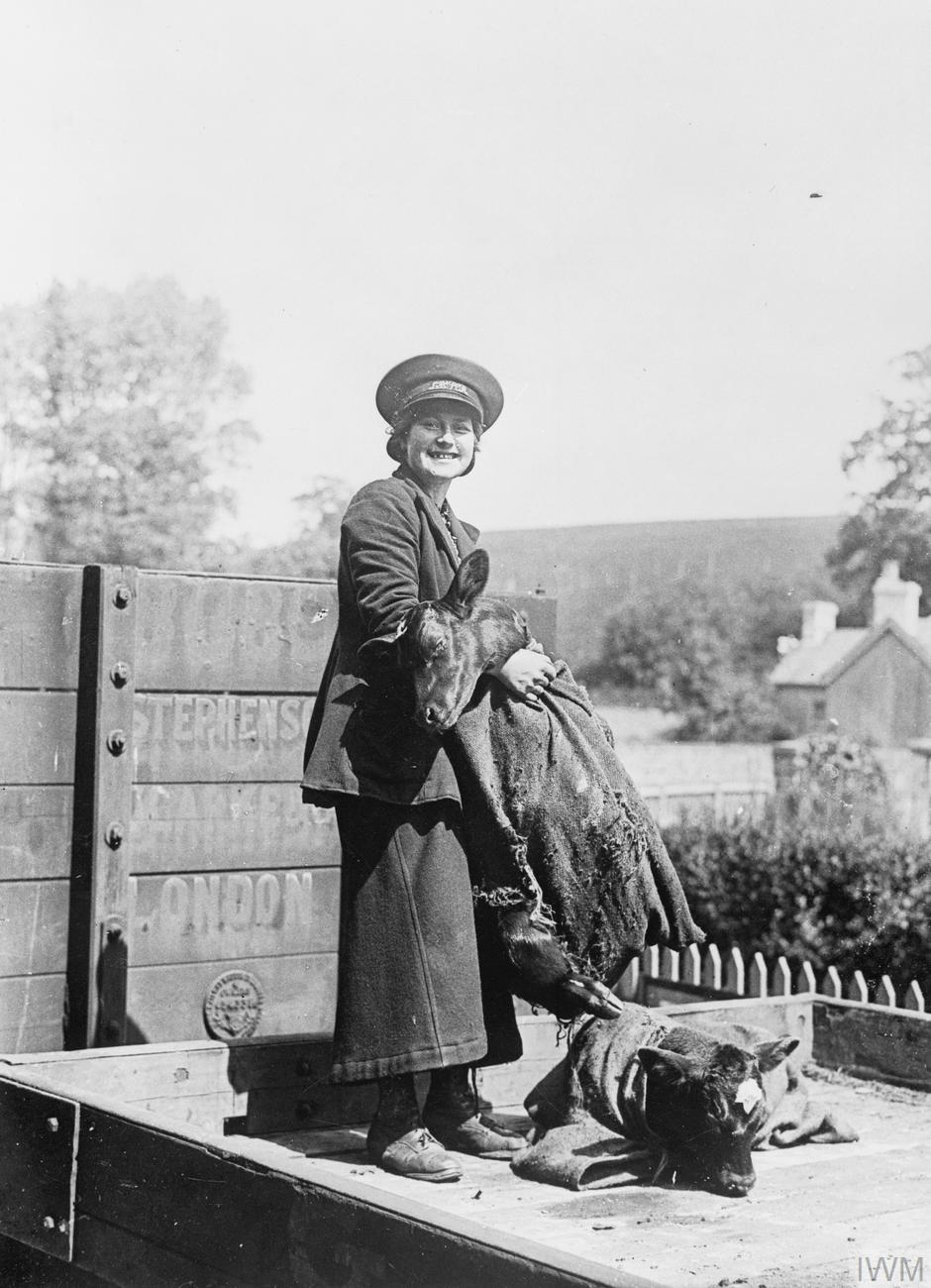
A female railway porter on the South Eastern and Chatham Railway.

A porter is a railway employee. The role of a porter is to assist passengers at railway stations, and to handle the loading, unloading, and distribution of luggage and parcels. In the United States the term was formerly used for employees who attended to passengers aboard sleeping cars, a usage unknown to British or Commonwealth English where such staff are known as attendants or stewards, terms which are also common in translation in non-English speaking European train travel.

The word derives from the Latin portare, meaning "to carry." Hence, in railroad use, the application to someone who carries baggage and parcels of passengers, among other duties.

== History ==
=== United Kingdom ===
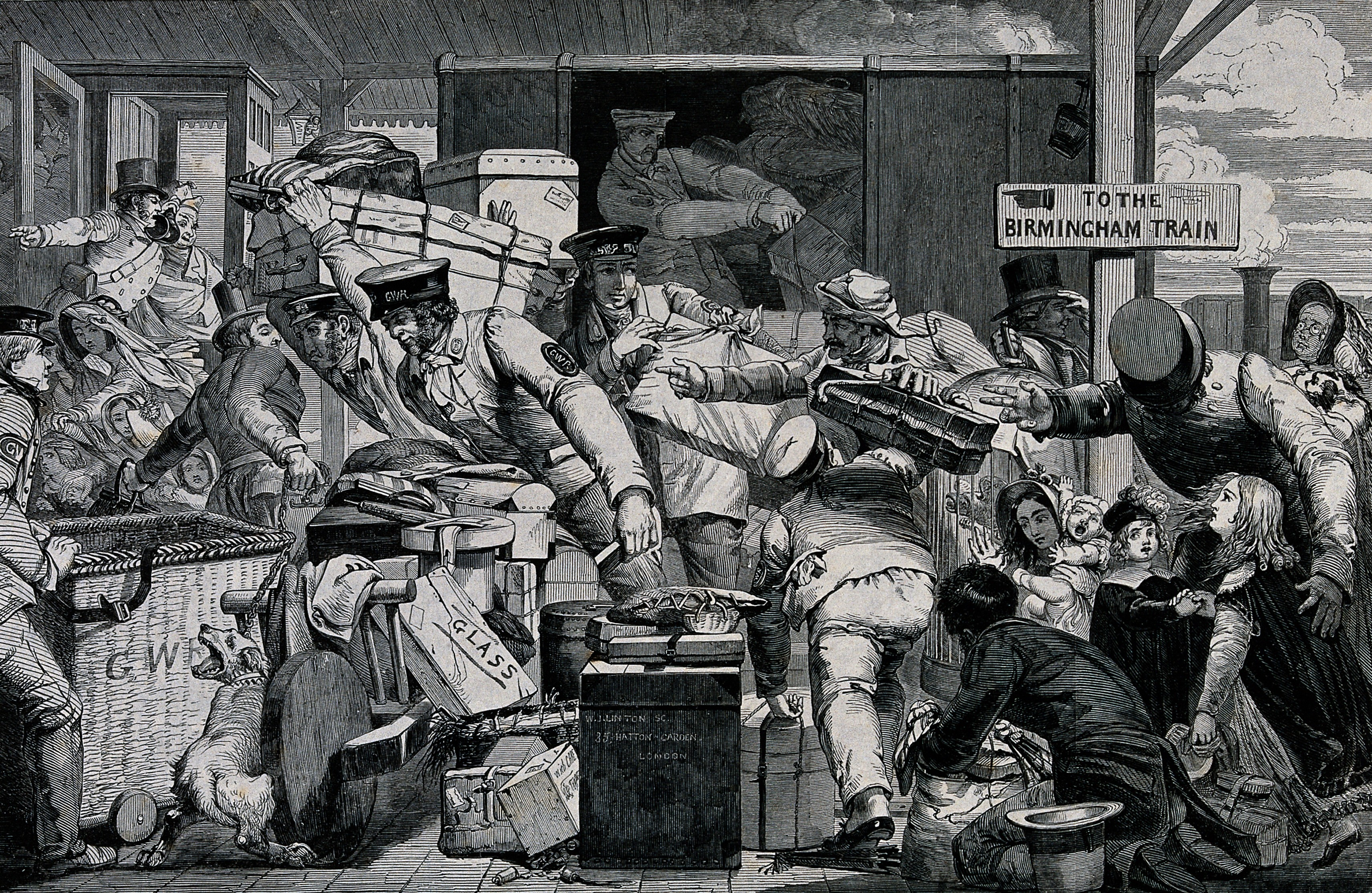
19th century drawing of railway porters moving luggage and giving directions to some children

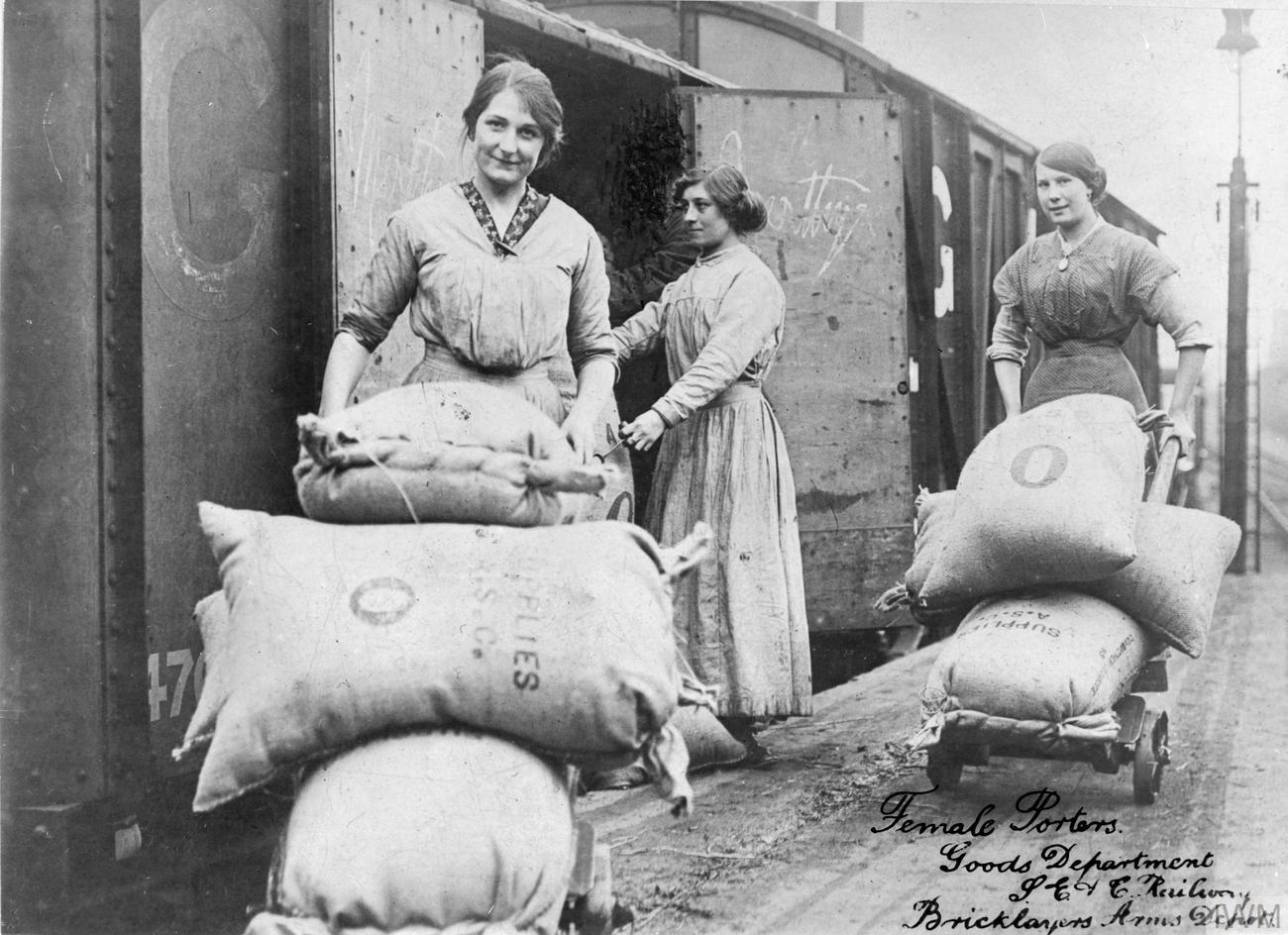
Railway porters hauling freight in London during World War I

Porters arose in the Traffic Department of early railway companies, as junior staff grades in most of the independent railway companies. Station porters handled passengers' luggage, assisted passengers to and from trains, carried out general cleaning duties in the station and on its platforms, and often assisted on ticket barriers and in booking offices as they advanced towards higher grades. Goods porters (also known as parcels porters) worked in the handling of parcels and packaged goods, especially in left luggage offices and in relation to parcels vans on trains.

Porters were, in most railway companies, the most junior grade of station staff, although some companies had the more junior position of station lad, usually held by a young unskilled and unqualified teenager, who would aspire to the role of porter after training.

A typical career progression would see a porter advance to become a head porter, then a ticket collector or booking clerk, which could in turn lead to the senior roles of assistant station master or station master. Other career progressions were also common on some railways. Research at the London School of Economics has shown (with particular reference to the Great Eastern Railway) how advances in rail signalling in the late Victorian era led to a shortage of skilled labour, with many unskilled porters advancing to porter signalman, and ultimately qualifying as signalmen.

Although porters are traditionally associated with railway stations, the role of travelling porter also existed on the British railways of the pre-grouping and Big Four era. Travelling porters travelled in the parcels cars of passenger trains organising luggage and parcels so that those required at any given station were always closest to the door upon arrival at that station. It was heavy manual labour, but was one of the roles taken over by female workers during the Second World War.

=== Australia ===
In Australia, a railway porter had various roles, similar to those described above. A baggage porter assisted with luggage; an operating porter assisted with safeworking duties; a station porter assisted with general station duties; and as in British usage a lad porter was a junior station porter.

=== North America ===
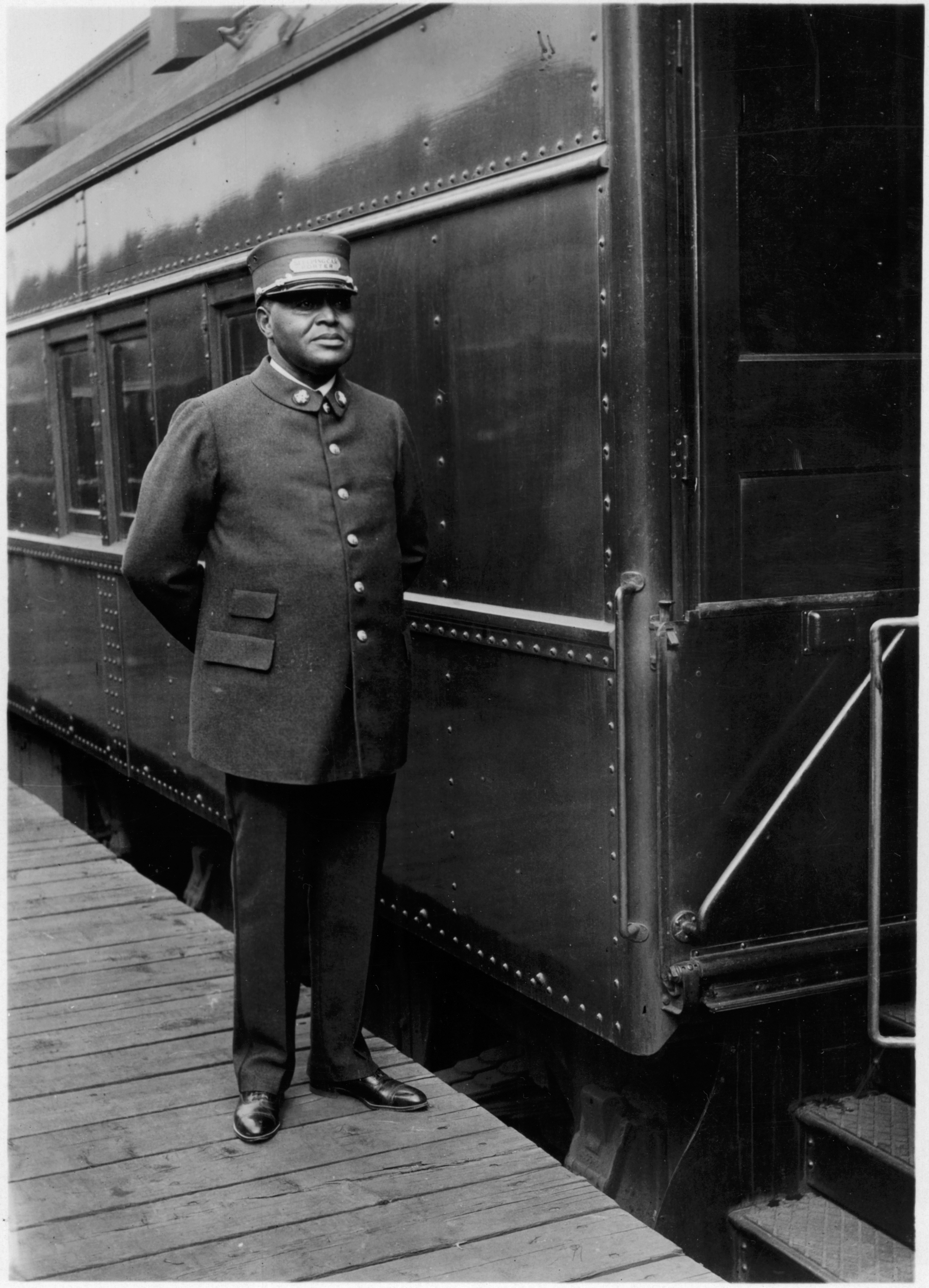
Railway porter, Canadian Pacific Railway (CPR), [ca. 1925]

In the United States and Canada, the term "porter" has a somewhat different history and contemporary usage, than the rest of the world. Until desegregation had its effect in the United States in the 1960s, the occupation of porter was almost the exclusive province of African American and Black Canadian men. It was the Civil War policy of George Pullman, head of the Pullman Company, who wished to tap into a huge potential work force that was also non-unionized. This eventually changed with the organization of the Brotherhood of Sleeping Car Porters under the leadership of A. Philip Randolph. In addition to carrying passengers' baggage to their berth or room, porters also provided personal services, such as clothes pressing and shoe shining.

In 2019, writer Cecil Foster published the book They Called Me George: The Untold Story of Black Train Porters and the Birth of Modern Canada, a study of the history of Black Canadian train porters.

Early Black Canadian civil rights activist, Charles Daniels, worked as a porter supervisor for the CPR in the early 20th century. He launched a discrimination lawsuit for $1000 in 1914 when the Sherman Grand Theatre in Calgary, Alberta, Canada refused to honor his floor ticket on account of his skin color.

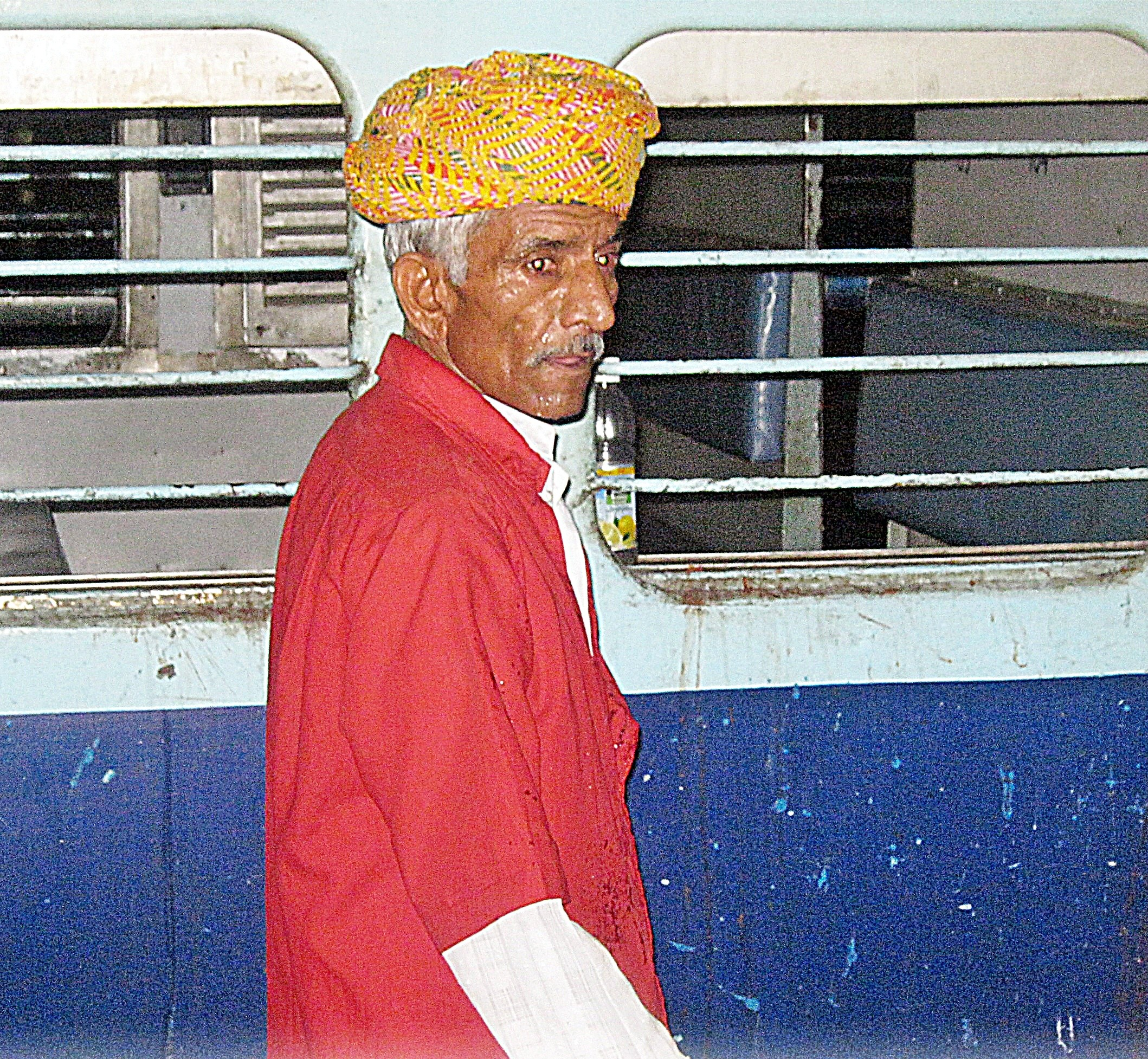
A porter at an Indian railway station wearing a turban, 17 September 2010

== Contemporary use ==
=== United Kingdom ===
Although the role of porter originated in the United Kingdom, and continued after railway nationalisation, it went into decline by the 1970s, with the general station duties role taken by station attendants, and the role of carrying luggage largely abolished. In more recent times however, following the privatisation of British Rail, the role of porter has made a limited comeback, particularly at busy city stations and stations with high numbers of tourists and holidaymakers in transit.

=== India ===
In India red-jacketed station porters are common at almost all stations across the network. Although Indian railway porters are not employed directly by Indian Railways they are centrally trained and licensed, holding a licence issued in the name of the President of India, and their role is carefully regulated, with local services (such as porters' offices, lavatories, and canteens) provided by the railway company. Their role is the traditional luggage-carrying job at railway stations.

=== United States ===
In the United States the term porter had the somewhat different meaning of a member of staff attending to passengers on board trains, particularly in sleeping cars, a role known as steward in most other countries. The American term is now obsolete, "attendant" being preferred.

== See also ==
- Pullman porter
- Society for the Prevention of Calling Sleeping Car Porters "George"
