= Roseland Theatre (Nova Scotia) =

Former cinema in New Glasgow, Nova Scotia, Canada

Coordinates: 45°35′11.4″N 62°38′42.6″W

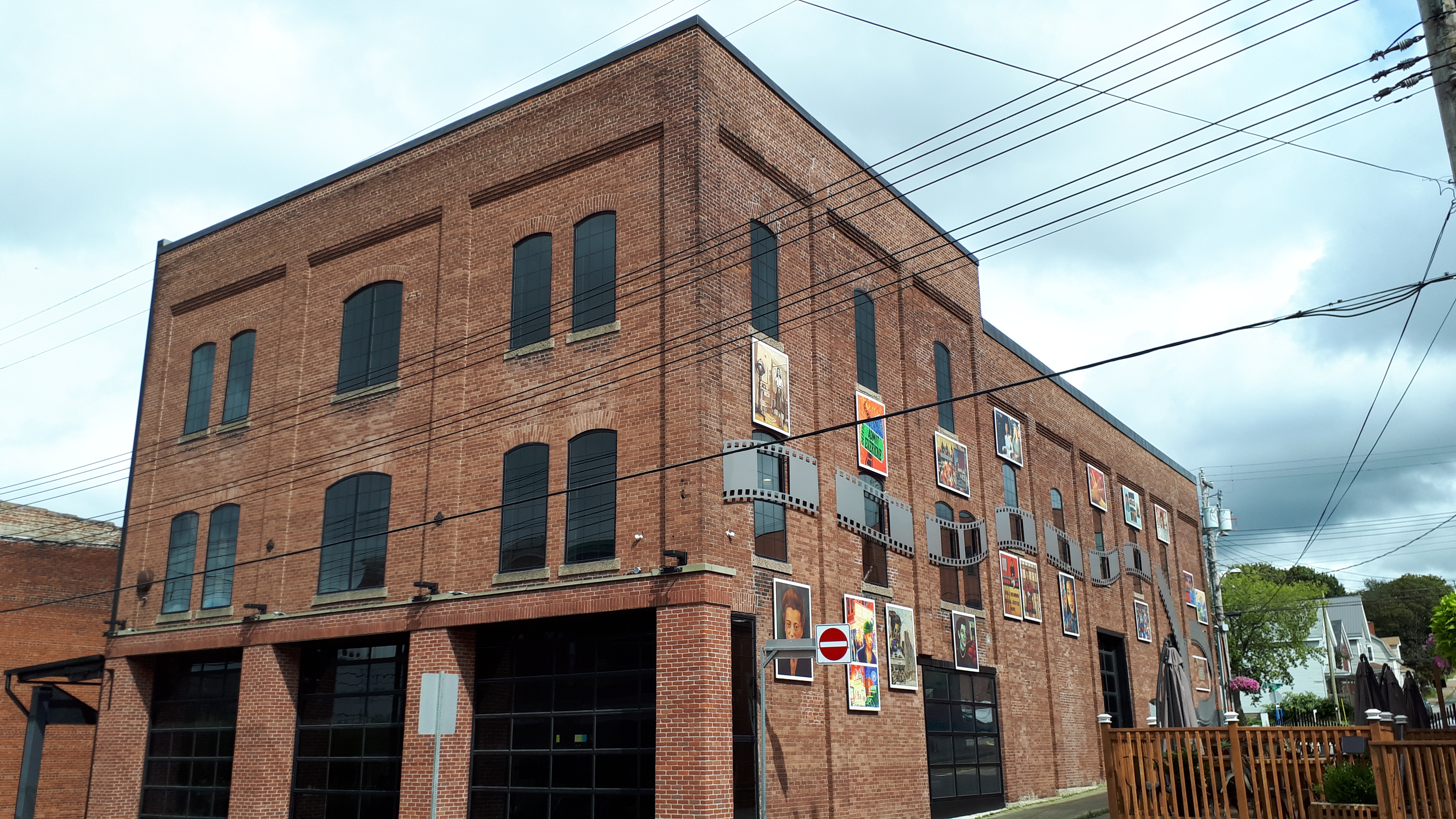
- The Roseland Theatre building as it appears in 2021 converted to retail space.
- Interactive map of Roseland Theatre
- Address: 188 Provost Street; New Glasgow, Nova Scotia; Canada
- Type: Movie theater and nightclub
- Current use: Office and retail space named Bespoke motor company

Construction
- Opened: 1913
- Closed: 2015
- Years active: 1913–1990 cinema, 2001–2015 nightclub

The Roseland Theatre is a landmark theatre in New Glasgow, Nova Scotia. Originally built for silent films, it is one of the oldest movie theatre buildings in Nova Scotia but it is best known as the location of a human rights case involving Viola Desmond, who challenged racial segregation in 1946. It was converted from a movie theatre to the "Roseland Cabaret" nightclub in the 1990s and to office and retail space in 2015.

== Origins ==
The Roseland Theatre was built in 1913 at the corner of Forbes and Provost Streets after a fire destroyed a hardware store and Oddfellows Lodge which had previously occupied the prominent location in downtown New Glasgow. The new theatre was built by John D. Grant, a local builder who later became the mayor of New Glasgow. Constructed of brick with three stories, the theatre included a marquee and two large display windows promoting current and coming attractions. The first owner was Henry (Harry) MacNeil. The theatre was renovated and updated for sound in 1929. The theatre marquee was topped with a large neon rose, which became a landmark in New Glasgow as the pre-eminent theatre in the town. It was also one of the two main film theatres for the Pictou County area – and the only one with a balcony.

== Segregation ==
Nova Scotia did not have racial equality laws for businesses such as theatres like all other Canadian provinces, so it allowed business owners to enforce racial segregation if they wished. In 1941, in response to complaints from white customers, the Roseland segregated its theatre, forcing African Nova Scotians to sit in the balcony. In 1943 a school class was ejected from the downstairs seats because the class included African Nova Scotian students. In response, Carrie Best, an African Nova Scotian writer and New Glasgow resident, decided to challenge the segregation. She arranged to purchase two tickets for the downstairs seating of the theatre and attempted to watch a film with her son James Calbert Best. Both were arrested and fought the charges in an attempt to challenge the legal justification of the theatre's segregation. Their case was unsuccessful and they had to pay damages to Roseland's owners. The experience helped motivate Carrie Best to found The Clarion, a newspaper aimed at African Nova Scotians which became an important voice in exposing racism.

== Viola Desmond case ==
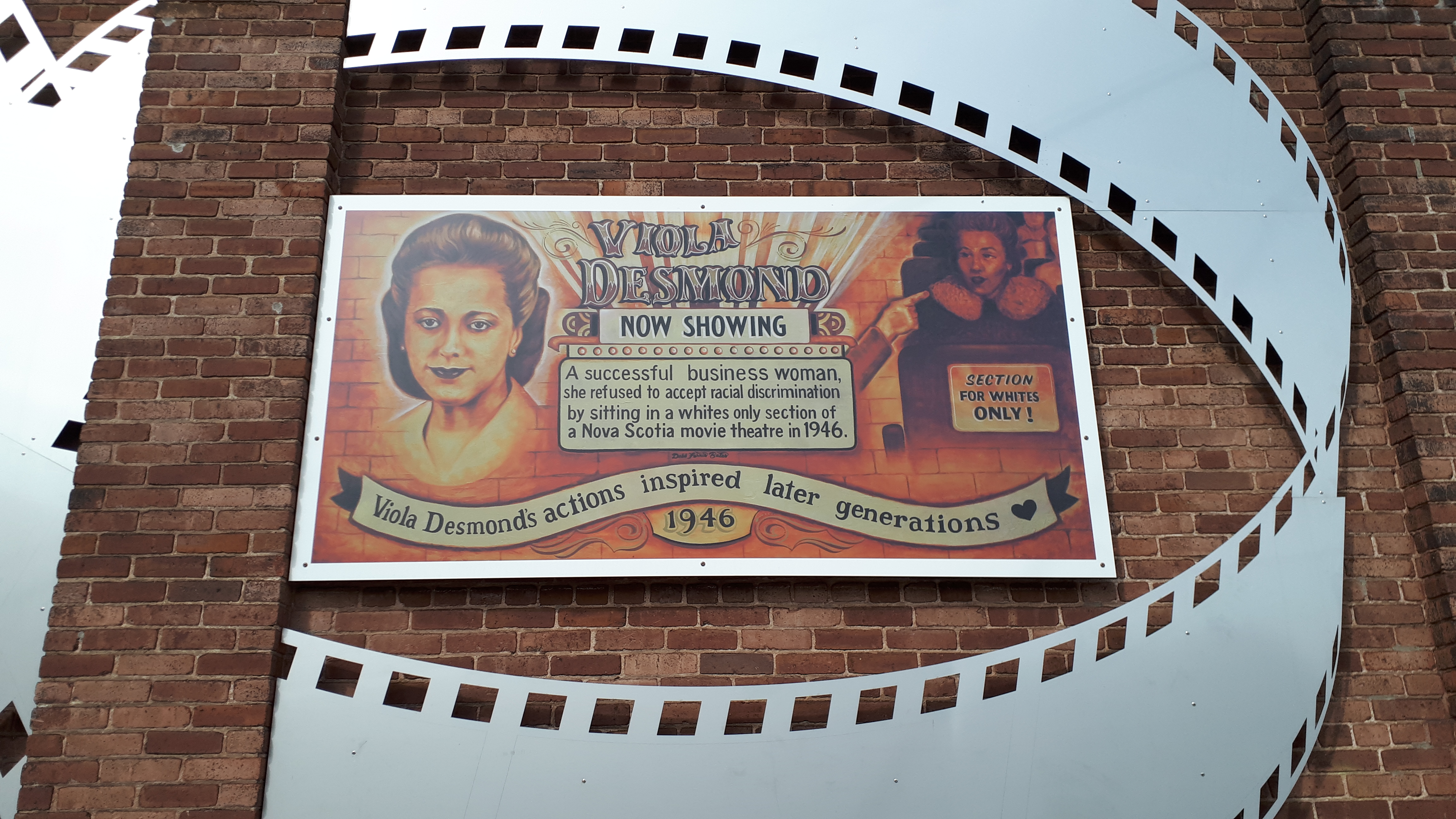
Artwork on the side of the theatre, commemorating the Viola Desmond case.

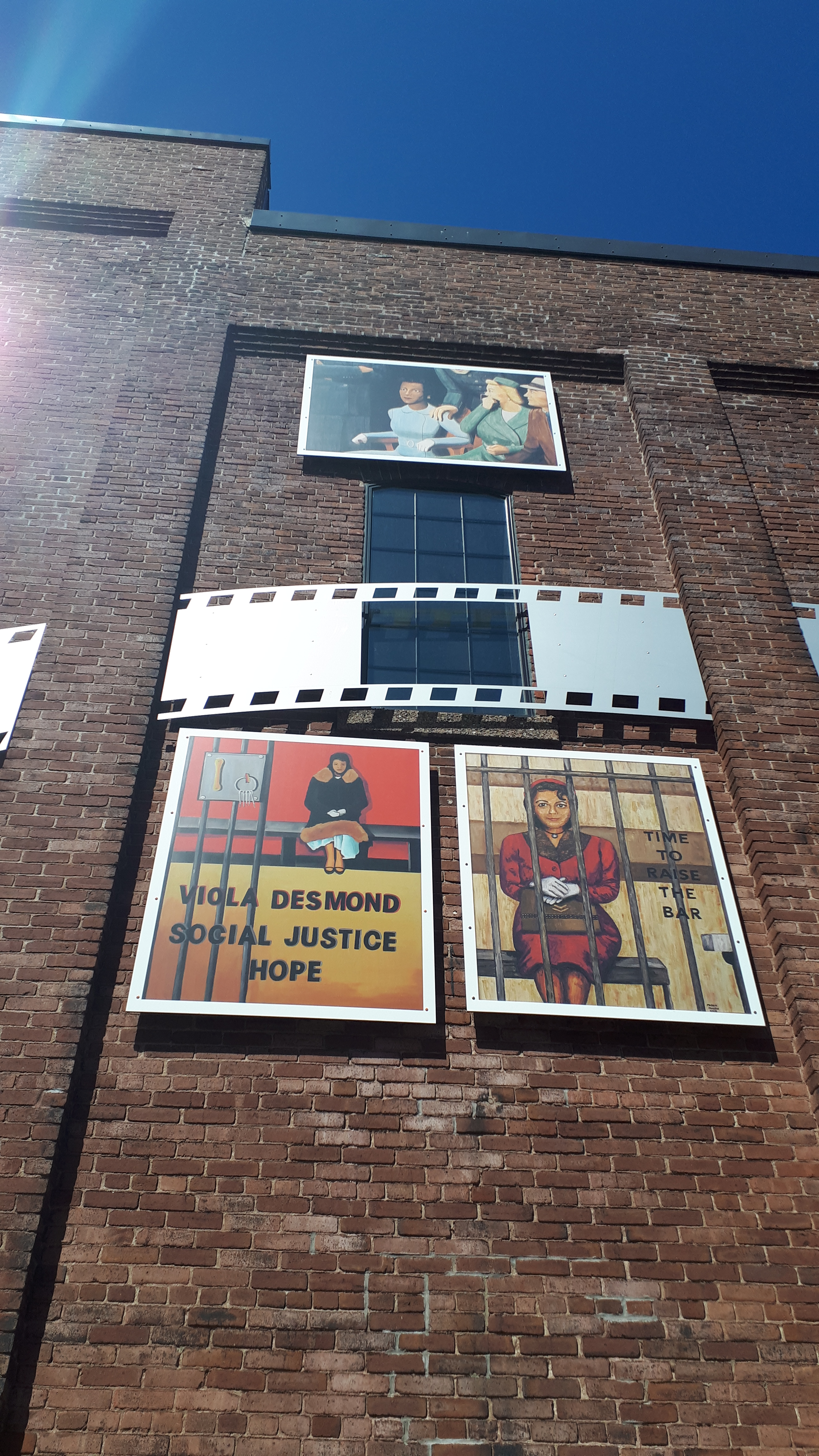
Artwork on the external walls of the theatre marking the Viola Desmond case.

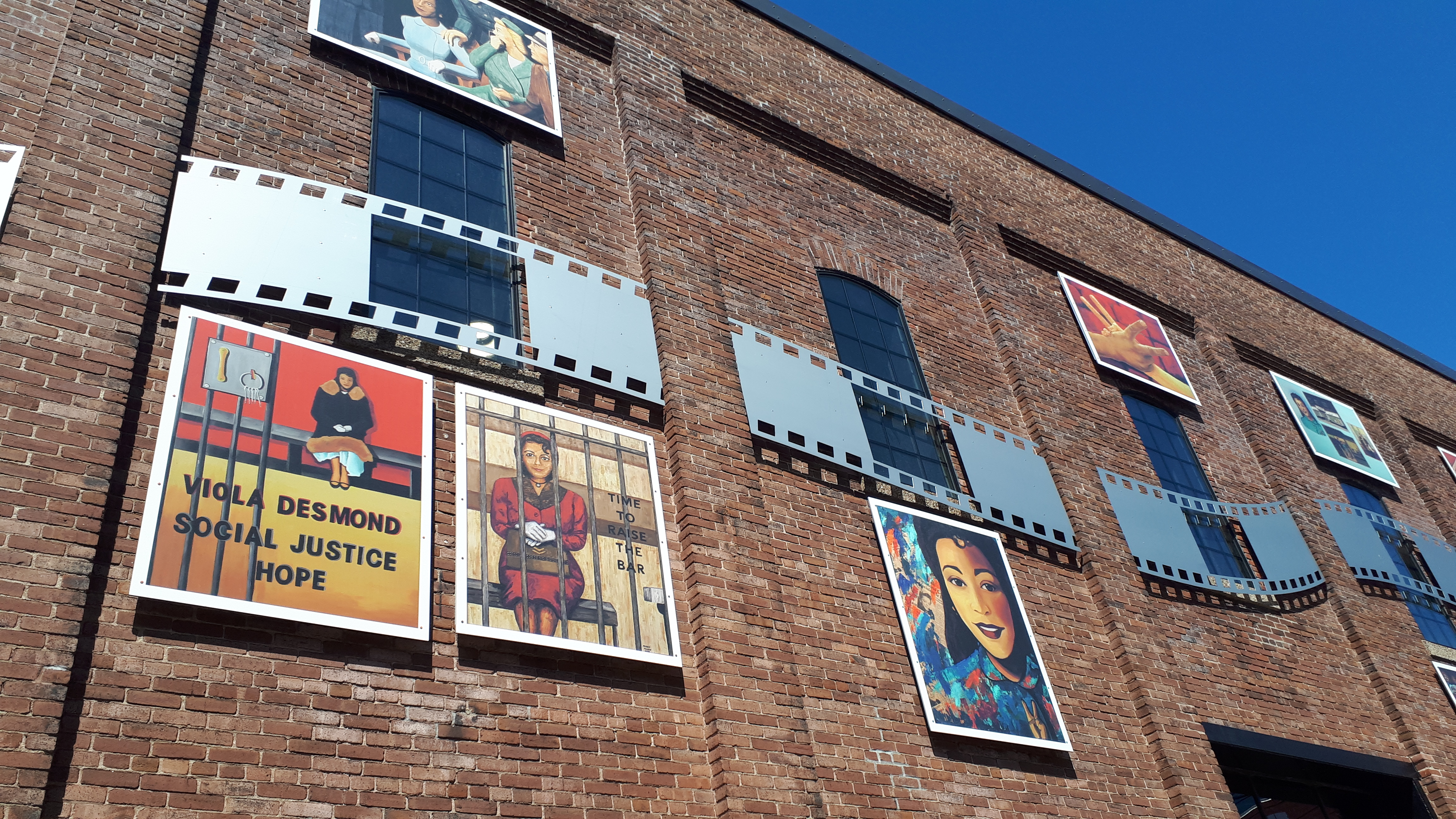
Artwork on the side of the theatre marking the Viola Desmond case.

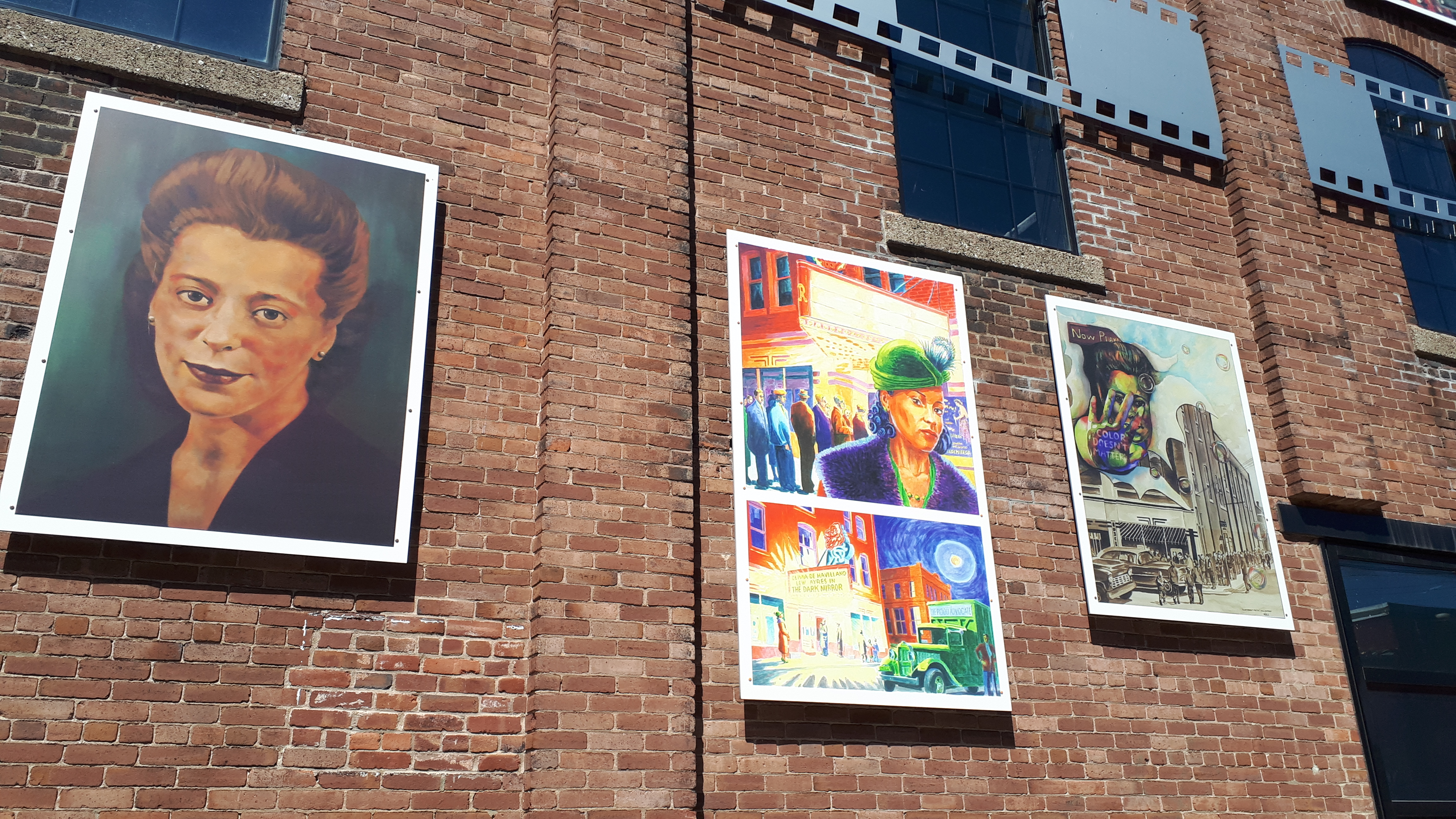
Art work from an art competition commemorating the Viola Desmond case.

Viola Desmond was a successful and respected businesswoman who ran a Halifax-based beauty parlour and beautician school. She was driving through New Glasgow on November 8, 1946, on business trip when her car broke down. While her car was being repaired, she went to the Roseland to pass the time seeing a movie. The Roseland was showing the film The Dark Mirror, a psychological thriller starring Olivia de Havilland about good and evil twins. Desmond bought a ticket for the 7:00 pm show and – not knowing that the Roseland was racially segregated – asked for a downstairs seat as vision problems made it hard for her to see the screen from a distance. Desmond was sold an upstairs seat for 30 cents (equivalent to $5.24 in 2025), which included the two-cent provincial tax. A downstairs ticket was 40 cents (equivalent to $6.99 in 2025) and the tax was a penny more. Desmond was told by usher Prima Davis that she did not have a downstairs ticket but when she returned to upgrade to an upstairs ticket the ticket seller Peggy Melanson told her, "I am sorry but I am not permitted to sell downstairs tickets to you people". Desmond decided to take her seat anyway and quietly found a seat near the front of the half-empty downstairs. The usher followed her and said "I told you to go upstairs". Desmond refused to move. The usher returned with the theatre manager, Henry MacNeil, son of the theatre's original owner who demanded that she leave. Desmond politely and repeatedly asked the manager to take her money to pay the extra for a downstairs ticket because of her eyesight. She refused to leave her seat and said she had a right to quietly enjoy the film like any other customer. MacNeil grew angry and left, returning with a police officer who ordered Desmond to leave. MacNeil and the policeman dragged the stoic Desmond up the aisle of the theatre and into the lobby inflicting numerous bruises. Her purse and shoe were ripped away in the process but returned to her by onlookers.

Desmond was taken to jail in a taxi where she was imprisoned for the night. The next day she was convicted of not paying the extra cent in provincial tax and paid a $20 fine as well as $6 to the Roseland Theatre's manager for legal costs. Desmond appealed the conviction but the Supreme Court of Nova Scotia dismissed the appeal over a legal technicality. The conviction was left on her record and she later moved to the United States, where she died in 1965. Her appeal of the Roseland Theatre conviction, while unsuccessful, drew attention to segregation in Nova Scotia and helped start a process among Black Nova Scotians that successfully ended the legal basis for segregation in theatres and other businesses in 1954. The case is now regarded as a pioneering challenge of racial segregation in Canada and Viola Desmond is often called Canada's Rosa Parks. The province of Nova Scotia issued a posthumous pardon and apology in 2010 to recognize Desmond. Her stand against racism and injustice at the theatre led the Bank of Canada to choose Desmond for the new Canadian ten-dollar bill in 2016.

== Later history ==
The Roseland Theatre later became part of the Odeon Cinemas chain. It was closed in the early 1990s as filmgoers switched to the multi-screen theatre at the Aberdeen mall. The marquee and namesake neon rose were removed, but the Roseland name has remained and the building exterior has otherwise changed little over several renovations. The theatre operated as the Roseland Cabaret nightclub. Complaints over assaults and vandalism by bar patrons led the mayor to call for a restriction of the cabaret's hours in 2015. The Roseland theatre marquee has been depicted prominently in several artworks associated with the Desmond case including a first-day cover by Canada Post and a replica set in a Heritage Minute by the Historica Canada Foundation.

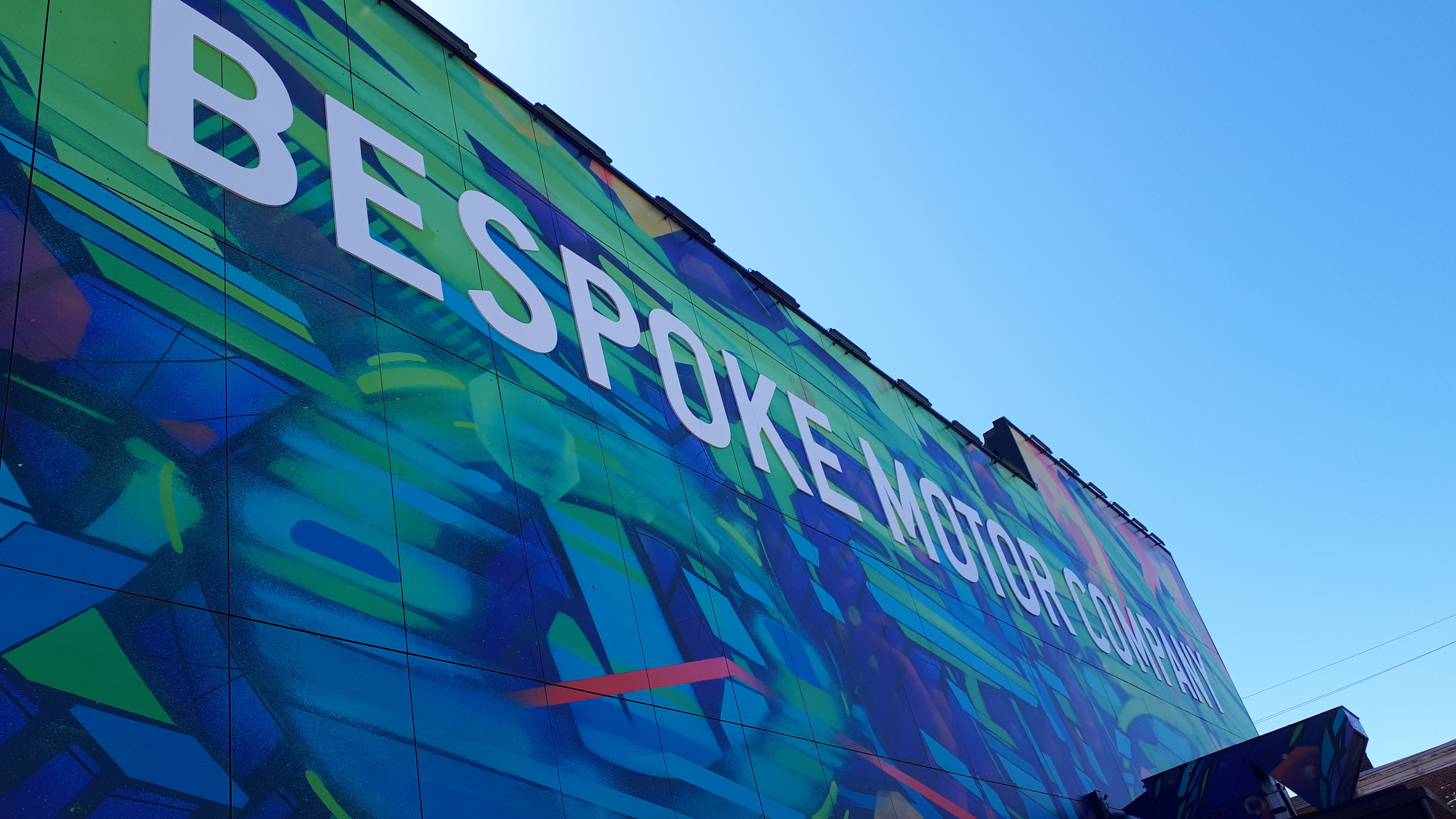
The theatre building currently houses the Bespoke Motor Company.

Despite the historical significance of the building, it received no heritage recognition until 2015 when Raymond Pentz, a new owner of the nightclub, made a plaque to display on the front of the theatre honouring Viola Desmond's stand against racism. However, in late October 2015, significant roof problems led the building's owner to close the nightclub and sell the building to MacGillivray Properties, a law firm and real estate development company. MacGillivray demolished the interior floors and restored the exterior of the theatre to convert it into office and retail space. The renovations uncovered vintage film projection equipment. Some original seats from the Roseland theatre were salvaged and have been preserved and used in displays by the Nova Scotia Museum, the Canadian Museum of History and the Bank of Canada Museum. In 2016, teachers and students of the New Glasgow Academy began to use the historic theatre as a destination for educational marches on Martin Luther King Day. Following class study of the history of the civil rights they marched to the Viola Desmond plaque on the theatre building. The Roseland's owners sponsored an art competition in 2018 for murals to depict the human rights history of the theatre. A custom motorsports company, Bespoke Motor Company, opened in the former theatre in 2021.
