= Guelph Black Heritage Society =

The Guelph Black Heritage Society was established in 2011 in Guelph, Ontario. It is incorporated through the Ontario Historical Society.

The impetus for the founding of the Society was when the historic Guelph BME (British Methodist Episcopal) Church was listed for sale in November, 2011. Part of the Society's mission is to restore and maintain the Church.

In 2017, the Society launched the Viola Desmond BIPOC Business Directory, to highlight and support BIPOC-owned businesses in Wellington County and the Waterloo Region.
