= Wanda Robson =

Canadian civil rights activist (1926–2022)

Wanda Robson ONS
- Born: Wanda Davis; December 16, 1926; Halifax, Nova Scotia, Canada
- Died: February 6, 2022 (aged 95); Cape Breton, Nova Scotia, Canada
- Spouse: Joseph Robson
- Relatives: Viola Desmond (sister)

Wanda Robson ONS (née Davis; December 16, 1926, in Halifax – February 6, 2022) was a Canadian civil rights activist.

== Activism ==
Wanda Robson's activism was deeply influenced by her sister, civil rights activist Viola Desmond. Robson has discussed how her sister's arrest made her more aware of the systemic racism in Canada and influenced her teaching and activism later in life. She played a pivotal role in obtaining a posthumous pardon for Viola in 2010, with the government of Canada acknowledging the injustice of her 1946 arrest for challenging racial segregation at the Roseland Theatre in New Glasgow, Nova Scotia.

Robson advocated for social justice and human rights in Canada. It is noteworthy that partially as a result of Robson's advocacy, her sister Viola Desmond was memorialized on the Canadian $10 bank note, the first Canadian woman ever to be featured on a regular bank note. Robson believed that education was extremely important. She spoke at many educational events, where she discussed the importance of a future free of racial discrimination.

Robson served three terms on the Nova Scotia Advisory Council for the Status of Women.

In 2022, Robson received the Order of Nova Scotia.

== Writing ==
Robson wrote two books. The first, co-written with Cape Breton Professor Graham Reynolds, was Viola Desmond, Her Life and Times, a biography for her sister. Robson’s second book, Sister of Courage (2010), recounts her own life.

== Personal life ==
=== Early life and personal background ===
Wanda Robson was the youngest of 15 children born to James Davis and Gwendolyn (Johnson) Davis, though only 11 of her siblings survived beyond childhood. Her parents, James and Gwendolyn Davis, were prominent members of the Black Nova Scotian community. Among her siblings was Viola Desmond, a pioneering Black Canadian businesswoman and civil rights activist. Wanda described her upbringing as busy but filled with love and support, with parents who were supportive of their children.

As a young woman, Robson worked at the Fisheries Research Board of Canada Halifax Laboratory. Recognizing her potential, the laboratory sent her for further training in chemistry at Acadia University in the early 1940s. She left Canada in 1948 after marrying her first husband.

While in the U.S., Robson worked as a nurse’s aide. After nine years, she returned to Canada as a single mother of three children, having left her marriage. During this period, she faced challenges as a Black woman and single parent, particularly in securing housing and employment. She later spoke about the racism she encountered during this time.

Robson secured a position at the Atlantic Fisheries Department, a government job that provided stability and a sense of accomplishment.

In her later reflections, Robson discussed the impact of systemic and internalized racism on her family. In her book Sister to Courage, she shared a story of when her sister converted to Catholicism and her father spoke about the benefits of joining a predominantly white congregation, believing that membership in a predominantly white congregation would provide better opportunities. At the time, Black students were largely excluded from nursing schools, and her father hoped that white Catholic parishioners could help Helen gain admission to a nursing program.

Robson met her husband, Joseph Robson, in the 1960s and the couple were parents to five children together.

Robson completed her lifelong dream of having a University education in 2004 at the age of 77, graduating from Cape Breton University with a Bachelor of Arts degree.

Robson died on February 6, 2022, at the age of 95. At the time of her death, she and her husband lived in North Sydney, Nova Scotia. She was buried alongside her sister in Camp Hill Cemetery in Halifax.
