= The Clarion (Canadian newspaper) =

Canadian newspaper

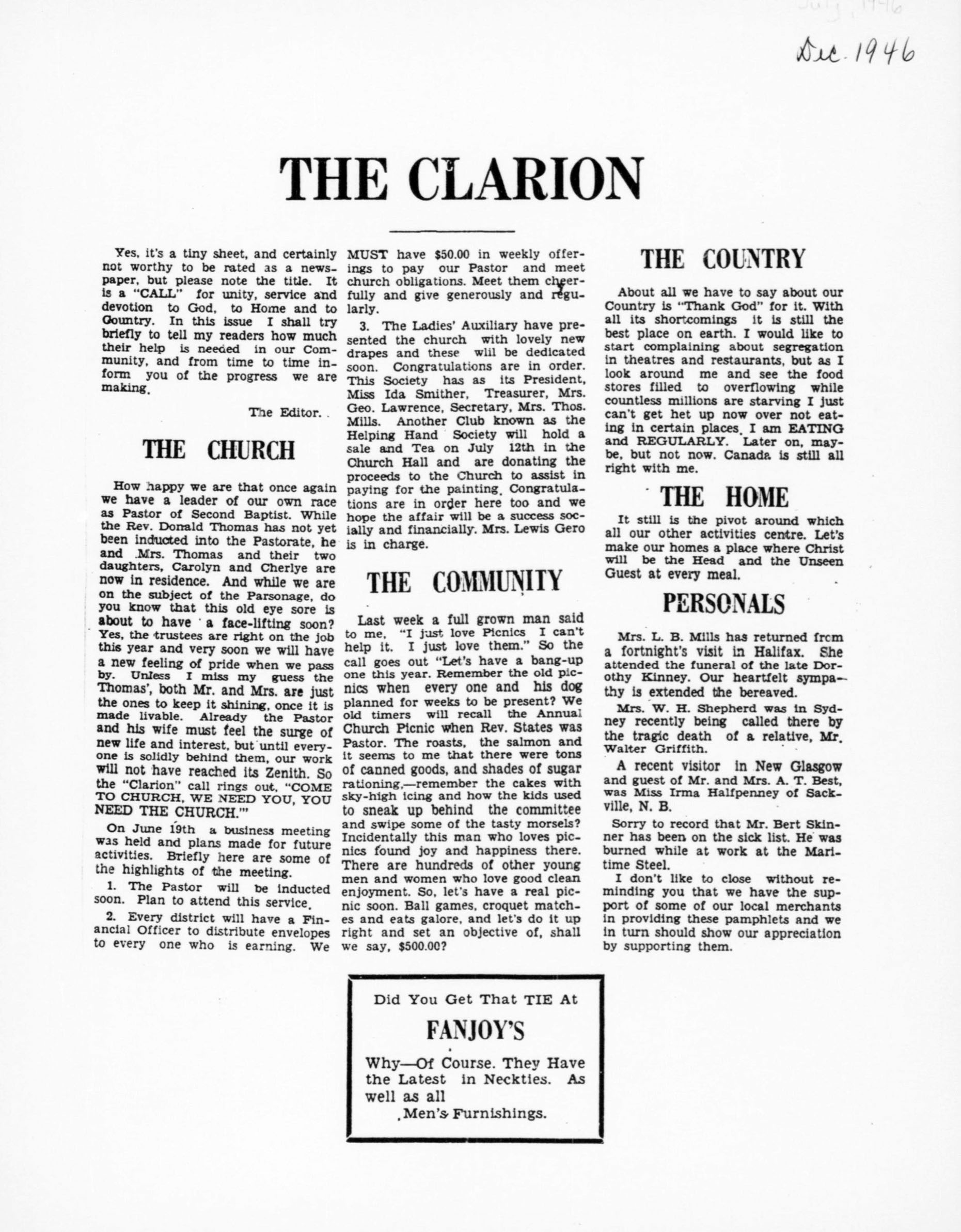
- Founder: Carrie Best
- Founded: December 1946
- Ceased publication: 1956
- City: New Glasgow, Nova Scotia
- Country: Canada
- ISSN: 1194-1634

The Clarion was a newspaper established in New Glasgow, Nova Scotia, by Carrie Best in 1946. It was the third publication in the province owned and published by a Black Canadian, after The Atlantic Advocate established in 1915 and The Nova Scotia Gleaner established in 1929. On the masthead below the newspaper's name was the text "Published in the Interest of Colored Nova Scotians".

== Background ==
In late 1941, two black girls attended the Roseland Theatre to watch a film. They were told to leave, and recounted this story to Carrie Best, who wrote to the owner to protest the action. Unable to resolve the issue, she and her 15-year-old son Calbert went to the theatre in December 1941, refusing to leave their seats in the whites only section of the theatre. They were later ejected and charged with disturbing the peace, for which they were convicted and fined. Best filed a lawsuit (Best v. Mason and Roseland Theatre) on the basis of racial discrimination against the theatre. She lost the lawsuit, with the judge stating that racial discrimination was superseded by an owner's right to exclude anyone from their property.

In November 1946, Viola Desmond was travelling to Sydney on a business trip to sell beauty products. Her car broke down in New Glasgow, and she had to wait a day for a part to be delivered. That night, she attended a screening of The Dark Mirror at the Roseland Theatre. The myopic Desmond tried to purchase a ticket for a floor seat, the whites only section of the theatre, instead of the further balcony seats, but the theatre sold her a ticket for the balcony seat. She nonetheless sat in a floor seat, and after refusing to leave, was eventually removed by police. She was later charged for a minor offence of tax evasion, because the ticket she was sold was 1 cent cheaper than the ticket for the seat she occupied.

== Founding ==
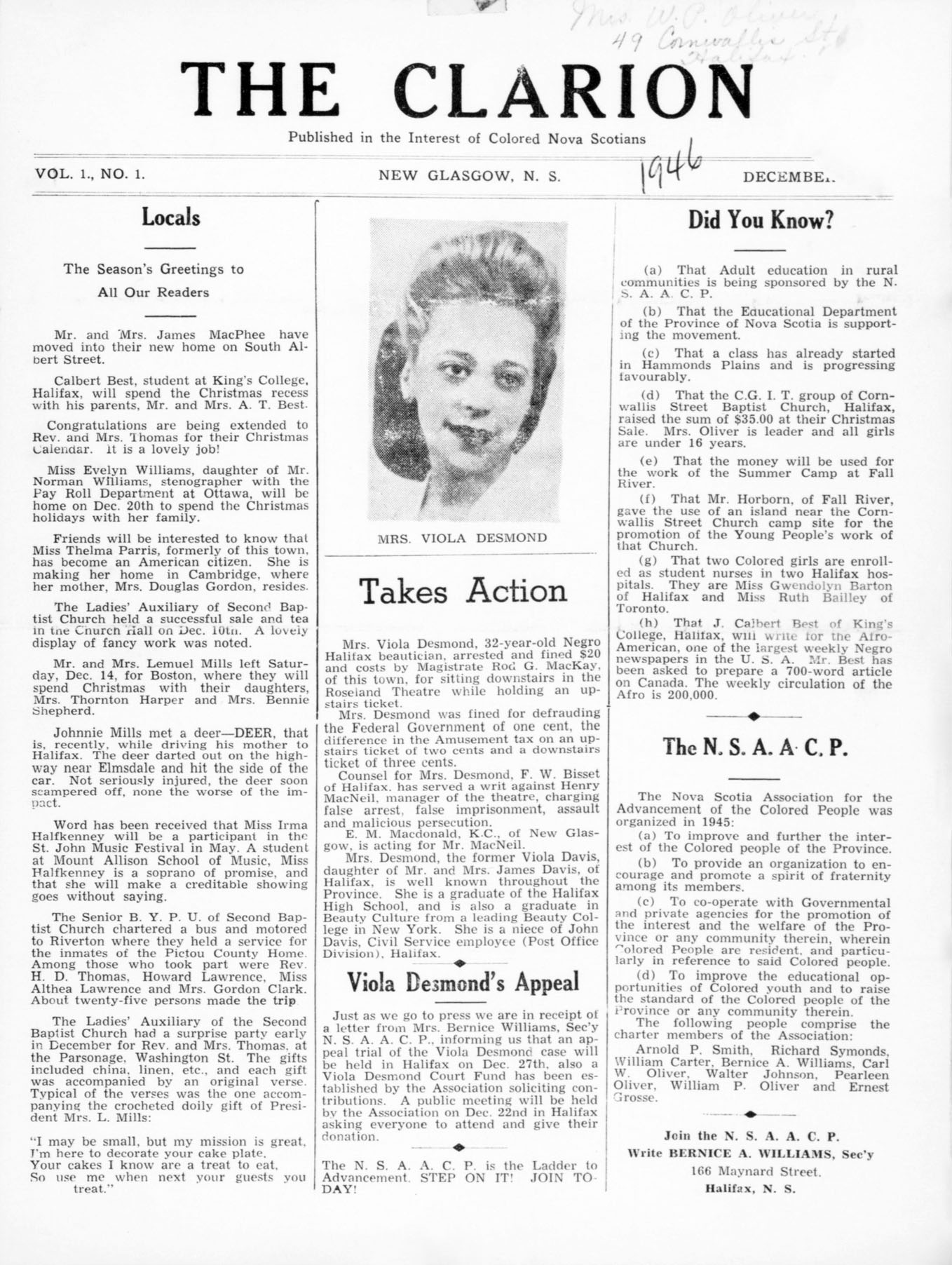
The front page of the relaunch tabloid format version of The Clarion, December 1946

The Clarion was established as an 8-by-10-inch (200 by 250 mm) single-sheet church bulletin focussed on the Second Baptist Church in New Glasgow. It was relaunched in tabloid format in December 1946, with the first issue devoted to Desmond's protest at the Roseland Theatre. The issue marked a shift for the newspaper from covering local issues to covering issues that advocated for racial equality throughout the province.

Best travelled to Halifax to seek advertisers. There, she met a Jewish merchant named Manuel Zive, to whom she said she "wanted to have something to say about racial understanding, because things were not good", and he replied that "You are just a small voice crying in the wilderness – but keep on crying", then gave her a cheque. The Clarion was incorporated in 1947 from donations she received, with Best becoming editor with assistance from her son Calbert.

In August 1949, by which time the newspaper was published in broadsheet format, it was renamed The Negro Citizen and distributed throughout Canada. The name was reverted to The Clarion in 1950. It ceased publication in 1956, at which time she began writing as a human rights columnist for the Pictou Advocate.
