= List of A Scattering of Seeds episodes =

The following is a list of episodes for the Canadian documentary television series A Scattering of Seeds, also known as A Scattering of Seeds: The Creation of Canada.

The series explored the contributions of immigrants to Canada. It was produced by White Pine Pictures. A total of 52 episodes originally aired on the History channel from 1998 to 2001, with repeats on various Canadian Television Networks, such as CBC Television, Société Radio-Canada (in French), TVOntario, Vision TV and The Discovery Channel.

== Series overview ==
| Season | Episodes | Originally released | |
| Season | Episodes | First released | Last released |
|---|---|---|---|
| 1 | 13 | 1998 | 1998 |
| 2 | 13 | 1999 | 1999 |
| 3 | 13 | 2000 | 2000 |
| 4 | 13 | 2001 | 2001 |

== Episodes ==
=== Season 1 (1998) ===
| No. overall | No. in season | Title | Directed by | Original release date |
|---|---|---|---|---|
| 1 | 1 | "Something From Nothing: The Shumiatcher Saga" | David Paperny | 1998 |
| 2 | 2 | "The Force of Hope: The Legacy of Father McGauran" | Lindalee Tracey | 1998 |
| 3 | 3 | "The Road Chosen: The Story of Lem Wong" | Keith Lock | 1998 |
| 4 | 4 | "For the Love of God: The Mennonites & Benjamin Eby" | Ann Kennard | 1998 |
| 5 | 5 | "Breaking the Ice: The Mary Ann Shadd Story" | Sylvia Sweeney | 1998 |
| 6 | 6 | "Acadian Spirit: The Legacy of Philippe d'Entremont" | Peter d'Entremont | 1998 |
| 7 | 7 | "Sons and Daughters: The Italians of Schreiber" | Patricia Fogliato and David Mortin | 1998 |
| 8 | 8 | "Watari Dori: A Bird of Passage" | Linda Ohama | 1998 |
| 9 | 9 | "The Impossible Home: Robert Kroetsch and his German Roots" | Carl Bessai | 1998 |
| 10 | 10 | "Passage from India" | Ali Kazimi | 1998 |
| 11 | 11 | "The Fullness of Time: Ukrainian Stories from Alberta" | Halya Kuchmij | 1998 |
| 12 | 12 | "The First Seeding" | Richard Boutet | 1998 |
| 13 | 13 | "A Land as Green as the Sea" | Tom Radford | 1998 |

=== Season 2 (1999) ===
| No. overall | No. in season | Title | Directed by | Original release date |
|---|---|---|---|---|
| 14 | 1 | "First Lady of the Yukon" | David Adkin | 1999 |
| 15 | 2 | "An English Sense of Justice" | Lindalee Tracey | 1999 |
| 16 | 3 | "Brothers from Vietnam" | Carl Bessai | 1999 |
| 17 | 4 | "New Norway: The Immigrant Trail" | Tom Radford | 1999 |
| 18 | 5 | "Straight Arrow" | Anna and George Prodanou | 1999 |
| 19 | 6 | "The Magnificent Abersons" | Laurence Green | 1999 |
| 20 | 7 | "Voice of Freedom" | Jacques Holender | 1999 |
| 21 | 8 | "Saga of Hope" | Juliann Blackmore and Ásthildur Kjartansdottir | 1999 |
| 22 | 9 | "The Stowaway" | Patricia Fogliato and David Mortin | 1999 |
| 23 | 10 | "Opening Night" | Marie-Claude Harvey | 1999 |
| 24 | 11 | "The Wanderer" | Sun-Kyung Yi | 1999 |
| 25 | 12 | "The Boatswain" | Janko Virant | 1999 |
| 26 | 13 | "The Haitian Heart of Love" | Carlos Ferrand | 1999 |

=== Season 3 (2000) ===
| No. overall | No. in season | Title | Directed by | Original release date |
|---|---|---|---|---|
| 27 | 1 | "Má Vlast (My Homeland): The Jiraneks In Canada" | Tom Radford | 2000 |
| 28 | 2 | "René Richard: Painter of the North" | Jean-François Monette | 2000 |
| 29 | 3 | "Sleight of Hand" | Laurence Green | 2000 |
| 30 | 4 | "Copyright: Leonard Frank" | Eli Gorn | 2000 |
| 31 | 5 | "Century Man: The Father Salamis Story" | Stavros Stavrides | 2000 |
| 32 | 6 | "Captain of Souls: Rev. William White" | Fern Levitt | 2000 |
| 33 | 7 | "A Glowing Dream: The Story of Jacob & Rose Penner" | Cathy Gulkin | 2000 |
| 34 | 8 | "An Act of Grace" | Sylvia Sweeney | 2000 |
| 35 | 9 | "The Reluctant Politician: The Story of Irene Parlby" | David Adkin | 2000 |
| 36 | 10 | "A Sephardic Journey: Solly Lévy… From Morocco to Montréal" | Donald Winkler | 2000 |
| 37 | 11 | "Kaposvar: The Faith of Lajos Nagy" | Stephen Onda | 2000 |
| 38 | 12 | "King of Hearts: Dreams of a Shepherd Boy" | Lindalee Tracey | 2000 |
| 39 | 13 | "Peaceable Kingdom: Nicholas Austin, Quaker Pioneer" | Martin Duckworth | 2000 |

=== Season 4 (2001) ===
| No. overall | No. in season | Title | Directed by | Original release date |
|---|---|---|---|---|
| 40 | 1 | "Pioneer Priest: Monseigneur Bourdel" | Donna Caruso | 2001 |
| 41 | 2 | "The Yellow Pear: The Story of Gu Xiong" | Audrey Mehler | 2001 |
| 42 | 3 | "An Irish Woman's Kingdom: Kit Coleman" | Lindalee Tracey | 2001 |
| 43 | 4 | "The Great Lone Land: The Life of R.B. Nevitt" | Tom Radford | 2001 |
| 44 | 5 | "The Other Side of the Curtain" | Patrick Reed and Laurence Green | 2001 |
| 45 | 6 | "A Farmer from Amber Valley: J.D. Edwards" | David Adkin | 2001 |
| 46 | 7 | "The Music Teacher" | Patricia Fogliato | 2001 |
| 47 | 8 | "Henry de Puyjalon: Lone Wolf of the North Shore" | Jean-François Monette | 2001 |
| 48 | 9 | "Wrestling with the Spirit: A Doukhobor Story" | Dorothy Dickie | 2001 |
| 49 | 10 | "Before His Time: Dr. Alfred E. Waddell" | Lalita Krishna | 2001 |
| 50 | 11 | "The Travelling Reverend" | Linda Ohama | 2001 |
| 51 | 12 | "The Furthest Possible Place: The Journey of Anna Maria Seifert" | Martin Duckworth | 2001 |
| 52 | 13 | "Servant of God: Berthold Imhoff" | Laura Turek and Hunt Hoe | 2001 |
