= James Calbert Best =

Canadian diplomat

- Born: James Calbert Best; July 12, 1926; New Glasgow, Nova Scotia, Canada
- Died: July 30, 2007 (aged 81); Ottawa, Ontario, Canada
- Education: University of King's College
- Parents: Albert T. Best (father); Carrie Best (mother)

James Calbert Best (July 12, 1926 – July 30, 2007) was a Canadian diplomat. He was High Commissioner to Trinidad and Tobago. He was Canada's first Black assistant deputy minister and first Black high commissioner.

A native of New Glasgow, Nova Scotia, Best earned a bachelor's degree in political science and a diploma in journalism from the University of King's College in Halifax and also did post-graduate work in public administration before moving to Ottawa. He was co-founder of the Civil Service Association of Canada, which evolved into the Public Service Alliance of Canada, and served as CSAC's first president, from 1957 to 1966. He served as director, personnel and administration, Office of the Comptroller of Treasury (1966–69); director-general administration, Department of Supply & Services (1969–70), and Assistant Deputy, Department of Manpower and Immigration, from 1970 to 1975. He was seconded to the Commonwealth Secretariat in 1975 and spent two years in London. He travelled widely, sharing his expertise with many Commonwealth governments. After the Ben Johnson steroid scandal, Best was appointed to a three-member panel to examine the future of sport in Canada. Their final report was entitled Sport - the Way Ahead.

Best was awarded an honorary LLB from King's College, Dalhousie University, where he also served on the board of governors. He received the Centennial Medal in 1967.

Best retired in 1990 after his term as High Commissioner to Trinidad and Tobago] He died in Ottawa at the age of 81.

Best arrived in Ottawa in 1949 to launch a 49-year career as a union activist, senior public servant and, eventually, high commissioner to Trinidad and Tobago. While Assistant Deputy Minister at the then Department of Employment and Immigration, he worked closely with the Deputy Minister and Minister to relax immigration laws to bring 604 Vietnamese boat people from aboard the Hai Hong to Canada in late 1978.

Best retired in 1990 after his term in Trinidad and Tobago, but continued to work as a consultant. In addition to chairing the taskforce on sport, he was commissioner of the Core Sport Study in 1993-94. In 1999, he was a member of the Treasury Board President's task force on the participation of visible minorities in the federal public service.

== Personal life ==
He was the son of Dr. Carrie Best and Albert T. Best of New Glasgow, Nova Scotia. Best was married to Doreen (Phills) until her death in 1992 and they had four children: Christene, Jamie, Stephen and Kevin. His youngest grand daughter, Avery Claire Mary Best, was born in March 2003, four years before his passing.

As a young man, Best and his mother Carrie founded the first African-Canadian owned newspaper, The Clarion, in New Glasgow.

According to his son Jamie Best, his father could have played professional baseball, hockey or basketball, but when he was young, there were no coloured people in sports.

Diplomatic posts
| Preceded by James Byron Bissett | High Commissioner to Trinidad and Tobago; 1985–1988 | Succeeded by Rodney Irwin |
