= Carrie Best =

Canadian journalist, social activist (1903–2001)

Carrie Best Prevoe OC ONS
- Born: Carrie Mae Prevoe; March 4, 1903; New Glasgow, Nova Scotia, Canada
- Died: July 24, 2001 (aged 98); New Glasgow, Nova Scotia, Canada
- Occupations: Journalist; social activist
- Known for: First black owner and publisher of a Nova Scotia newspaper
- Spouse: Albert T. Best (m. 1925)
- Children: James Calbert Best
- Awards: Order of Canada; Order of Nova Scotia

Carrie Mae Best OC ONS (nee Prevoe; March 4, 1903 – July 24, 2001) was a Canadian journalist and social activist.

== Biography ==
Carrie was born in New Glasgow, Nova Scotia. She was the daughter of James Prevoe and Georgina Prevoe. In 1925, she married Albert T. Best. They had one son, named James Calbert Best in 1926. They later adopted four foster children: Berma, Emily, Sharon and Aubery Marshall .

In 1943, she confronted the racial segregation of the Roseland Theatre in New Glasgow. She purchased two tickets for the downstairs seating of the theatre and attempted to watch a film with her son James Calbert Best] Both were arrested and fought the charges in an attempt to challenge the legal justification of the theatre's segregation. Their case was unsuccessful and they had to pay damages to Roseland's owners. However, the experience helped motivate Carrie Best to found The Clarion in 1946, the first black-owned and published Nova Scotia newspaper. It became an important voice in exposing racism and exploring the lives of Black Nova Scotians. In the first edition of The Clarion, she broke the story of Viola Desmond who also challenged racial segregation at the Roseland Theatre and whose story became a milestone human rights case in Canada. In 1952, Carrie Best started a radio show, The Quiet Corner, which was aired for 12 years. From 1968 to 1975, she was a columnist for The Pictou Advocate, a newspaper based in Pictou, Nova Scotia.

Her son James Calbert Best, who helped found The Clarion, became a union activist, senior public servant and high commissioner to Trinidad and Tobago.

In 1977, she published the autobiography That Lonesome Road.

In 1974, she was made a Member of the Order of Canada, "in recognition of her zealous work as writer and broadcaster." She was then promoted to Officer on December 18, 1979. She posthumously was awarded the Order of Nova Scotia in 2002. She is commemorated on a postage stamp issued by Canada Post on February 1, 2011. Best died at the age of 98 of natural causes in New Glasgow. She was featured in a Google Doodle on December 17, 2021.

== See also ==
- Nova Scotia Heritage Day
- Black Nova Scotians
