= A Scattering of Seeds =

Canadian documentary television series

A Scattering of Seeds, also known as A Scattering of Seeds: The Creation of Canada, is a Canadian documentary television series.

The series explored the contributions of immigrants to Canada. It was produced by White Pine Pictures. A total of 52 episodes originally aired on the History channel from 1998 to 2001, with repeats on various Canadian Television Networks, such as CBC Television, Société Radio-Canada (in French), TVOntario, Vision TV and The Discovery Channel.
