= The Grand (Calgary) =

Theatre in Calgary, Canada

The GRAND
- Sherman Grand Theatre Showcase Grand; Theatre Junction GRAND The Grand Theatre
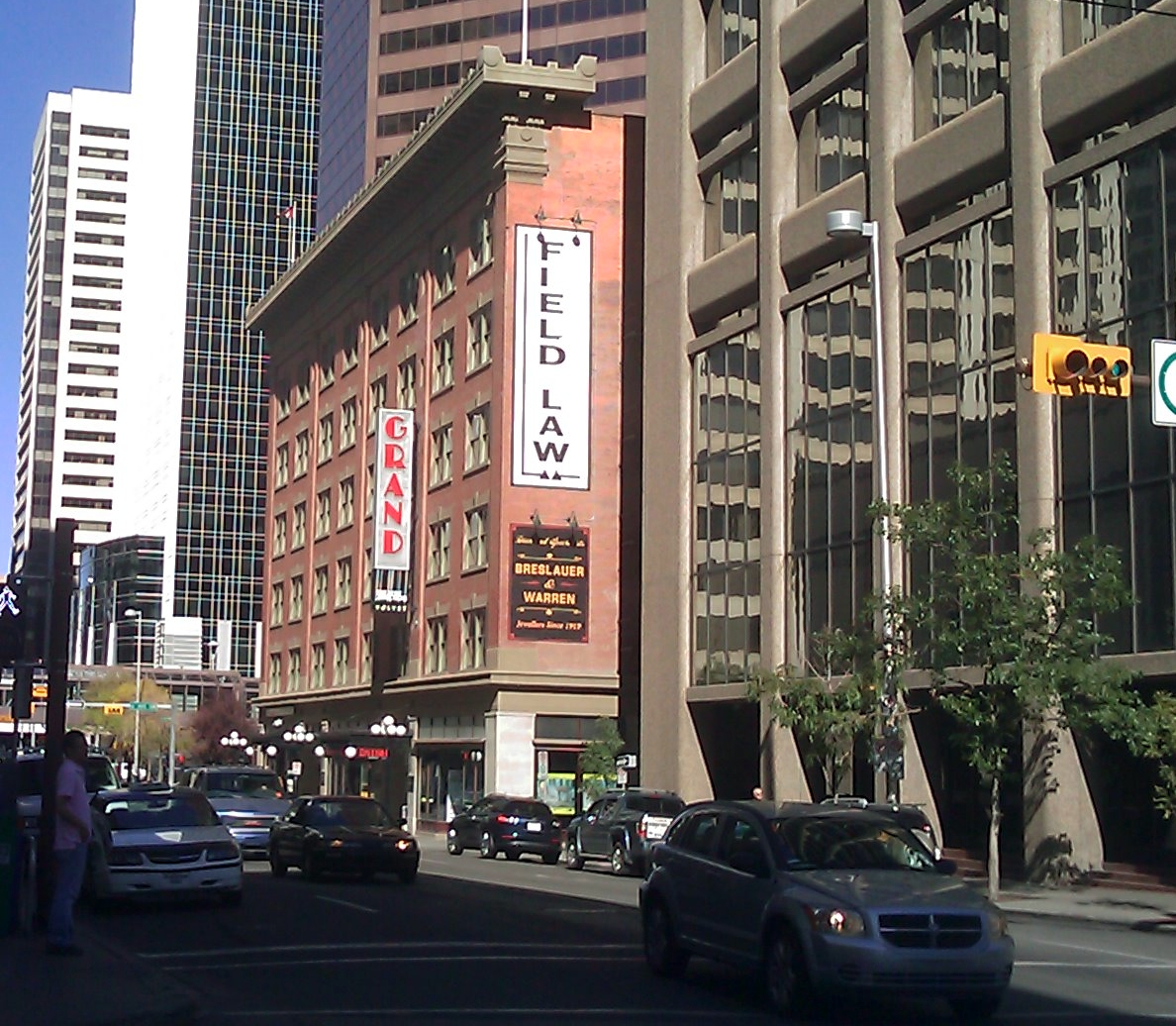
- Interactive map of The GRAND
- Address: 608 1 Street SW; Calgary, Alberta; T2P 1M6
- Coordinates: 51°02′49″N 114°03′55″W
- Owner: 2021: Allied Properties REIT 2018: The Calgary GRAND Theatre Society; 2004: Theatre Junction GRAND; 2003: Neil Richardson; 1979: Hanover Management; 1977: Dynacorp Group of Calgary; 1973: Louis Desrochers; 1969: Odeon; 1936: J.B. Barron 1912: Lougheed Family
- Operator: The Calgary GRAND Theatre Society
- Capacity: 2006: 436 1984: 1,200; 1972: 1,150 1912: 1,350
- Current use: Theatre

Construction
- Opened: 1912; reopened 2006
- Architects: L.R. Wardrop (original); Sturgess Architecture (2006)

Website
- www.thegrandyyc.ca

The Grand, stylized as The GRAND (formerly Sherman Grand, Showcase Grand, The Grand Theatre, and Theatre Junction GRAND), is the oldest theatre in the downtown core of Calgary, Alberta, Canada. In its current incarnation, it houses and operates the 436-seat Flanagan Theatre and a rehearsal space, the Studio.

== History ==
The Grand Theatre is housed in the historic Lougheed Block, which was built in 1912 by Sir James Alexander Lougheed when Calgary had a population of only 50,000 people. The building was designed by L.R. Wardrop and owned by Lougheed and Taylor, a firm established by Sir Lougheed. The Lougheed Block was built as a multi-purpose commercial building, accommodating retail stores, offices, living quarters, and The Grand Theatre on the ground floor and was the biggest theatre in western Canada at the time. The theatre was leased to Bill Sherman to manage and Lougheed named the theatre the "Sherman Grand" after him.

The theatre opened on February 5, 1912 with "The Passing of the Third Floor Back" starring Johnston Forbes-Robertson and attracted other well-known performers such as Sarah Bernhardt, Fred Astaire, Ethel Barrymore, the Marx Brothers, George Burns, Arthur Rubinstein, and Paul Robeson, among others. The Grand Theatre was also the centre of Calgary's social and political life and served as a venue for political rallies, debates, and speaking engagements. Both the Liberal and Conservative Parties held rallies at the theatre as did Nellie McClung of the "Famous Five," Prime Minister Robert Borden, and Premier William Aberhart.

The original Grand Theatre was fashioned with 1,350 seats (810 on the main floor and 540 in the upper gallery) and boasted the largest stage in Canada when it first opened. The Grand was considered modern for its time as all 15 of the dressing rooms below the stage had hot and cold running water as well as electric lighting. The theatre was also equipped with an automatic sprinkler system. In 1957, with the opening of The Southern Alberta Jubilee Auditorium, The Grand Theatre became primarily a movie house, an incarnation that lasted for almost 50 years. In 1969, Odeon took over management of the theatre and renovated the theatre in 1972 to accommodate twin theatres that sat 625 each. In 1984, the building owner, Hanover, worked with Odeon (Cineplex Odeon as of 1983) to modernize the theatre, converting it into an up-and-down twin theatre with a total capacity of 1,200 - 750 on the main level and 450 on the upper level. They rebranded the Grand the following December as the Showcase Grand. However, despite the renovation, this was not a success for Odeon and they chose not to renew their lease when it ended in 1999 and the theatre officially closed in late November 1999.

In 1998, columnist Peter Stockland wrote an article in the Calgary Herald stating that the Grand was threatened with demolition. In response the Alberta Historical Preservation and Rebuilding Society formed a group, the Save the Grand Lougheed Committee, to save the theatre and included members of the general public, including University of Calgary student Cara Fast (acting chair) and nurse Alison Robertson (permanent chair). They collected 4,000 signatures to petition the Alberta Government to have the theatre (and the Lougheed Building as a whole) as a provincially protected historic site under the Historical Resources Act of Alberta. An August 1998 report called the Historical Resource Impact Assessment of the Lougheed Building for Prairie Fund Management (Forseth Report, in short) identified major electrical, mechanical, architectural, and structural issues but despite this report and the work required to attend to these issues, the report concluded that the Lougheed Building and the Grand were worthy of preservation and protection. However, in November 1999, the then Minister of Alberta Community Development, Stan Woloshyn, declined to designate the building as a provincial historic site.

However, despite these efforts, in November 2000, the Calgary Planning Commission gave the green light for the building to be demolished and a twenty-two-story office tower to be built on the site. In 2001, the owners of the theatre were looking to have a short-term tenant as a stop-gap measure to stall the demolition of the theatre and development of the site. They leased it to Terry Carter who operated the Players Grand Golf Centre. However, there was a turning point in 2003 when Neil Richardson bought the Lougheed and the Grand and announced his intention to restore and rehabilitate the Lougheed Building and the Grand.

On March 22, 2004, Calgary City Council recommended that the efforts be made to ensure that the Grand Theatre continue to provide performance space. On March 30, 2004, Theatre Junction (General Manager Carol Armes and Artistic Director Mark Lawes) signed a deal to purchase the theatre which went through on September 2, 2004. They received a significant donation from philanthropist Jackie Flanagan and raised an additional CAD$11 million to purchase and renovate the theatre into a "culture house" that would support "contemporary performance in theatre, dance, music, and film." Theatre Junction transformed the old theatre into the Theatre Junction GRAND, which opened in 2006. In December 2018, the theatre rebranded itself to The Grand (new legal name the Calgary GRAND Theatre Society) and Theatre Junction was no longer associated with the Grand after a period of mounting deficits and alleged toxic workplace culture. As a result of the mounting deficit incurred, the Calgary GRAND Theatre Society sold the Grand Theatre to Allied Properties REIT in early 2021 with the Grand now being a tenant.
