= Viola Desmond =

Black Canadian business woman and activist (1914–1965)

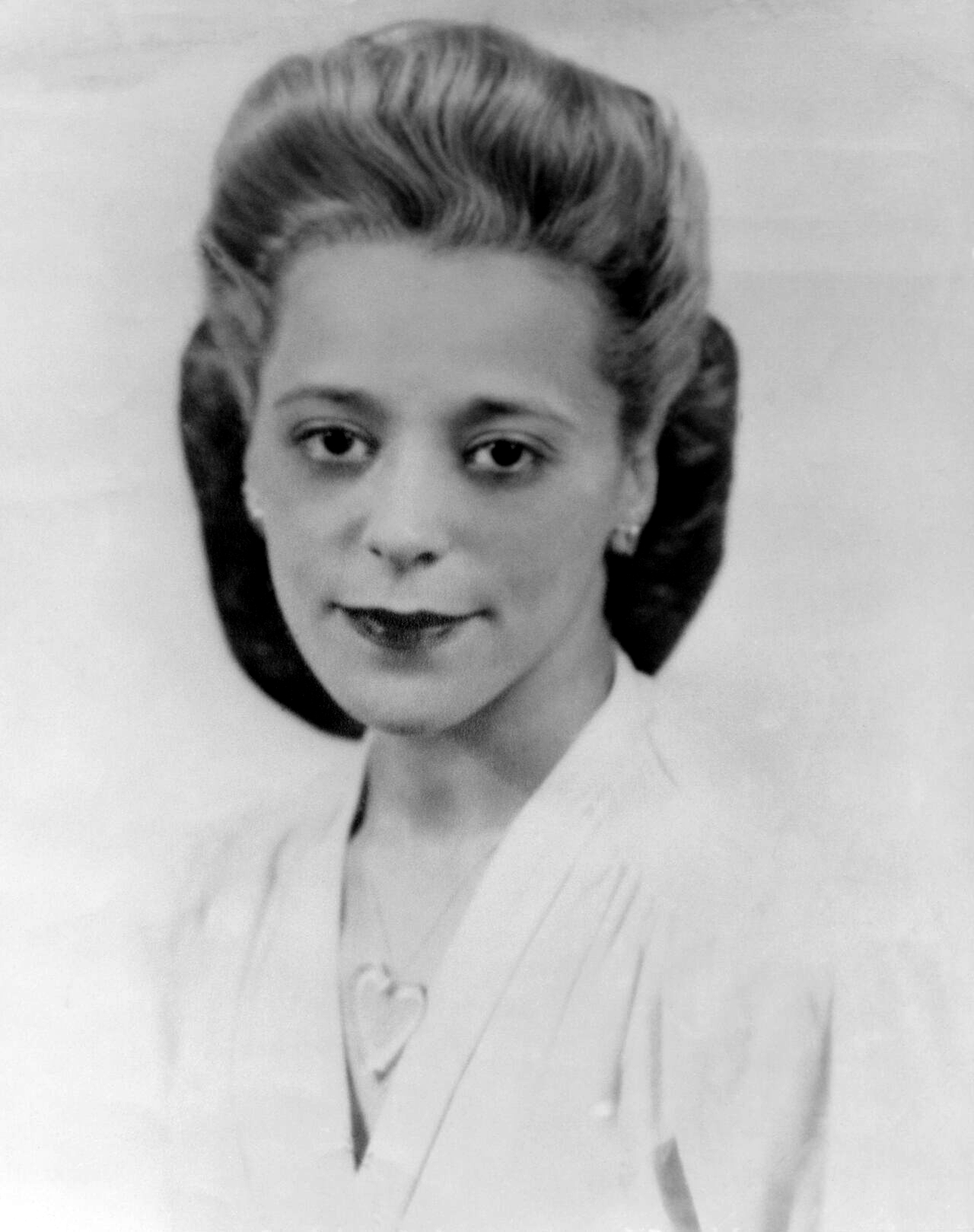
- Desmond c. 1940
- Born: July 6, 1914; Halifax, Nova Scotia, Canada
- Died: February 7, 1965 (aged 50); New York City, U.S.
- Resting place: Camp Hill Cemetery, Halifax
- Occupations: Business owner and beautician
- Known for: Challenging racial segregation in Canada after refusing to leave a whites-only cinema seat in 1946
- Spouse: Jack Desmond

Viola Irene Desmond (July 6, 1914 – February 7, 1965) was a Canadian civil and women's rights activist and businesswoman of Black Nova Scotian descent. In 1946, she challenged racial segregation at a cinema in New Glasgow, Nova Scotia, by refusing to leave a whites-only area of the Roseland Theatre. For this, she was convicted of a minor tax violation for the one-cent tax difference between the seat that she had paid for and the seat that she used, which was more expensive. Desmond's case is one of the most publicized incidents of racial discrimination in Canadian history and helped start the modern civil rights movement in Canada.

In 2010, Viola Desmond was granted a posthumous free pardon, the first to be granted in Canada. A free pardon deems the person granted the pardon to have never committed the offence and cancels any consequence resulting from the conviction, such as fines, prohibitions or forfeitures. However, it was not until 2021 that the government repaid the $26 (worth $368 CAD as of 2021) fine to her estate in the form of a $1,000 scholarship that adjusted the amount to reflect the time value of money. The Crown-in-Right-of-Nova Scotia also apologized for prosecuting her for tax evasion and acknowledged she was rightfully resisting racial discrimination.

In late 2018, Desmond became the first Canadian-born woman to appear alone on a Canadian bank note—a $10 bill—which was unveiled by Finance Minister Bill Morneau and Bank of Canada Governor Stephen Poloz during a ceremony at the Halifax Central Library on March 8, 2018. Desmond was also named a National Historic Person in 2018.

== Biography ==
Viola Desmond was born on July 6, 1914, one of ten children of James Albert Davis, a black Canadian stevedore and barber, and Gwendolin Irene Johnson, a white American whose family had moved from New Haven, Connecticut. She was raised by her father and mother in Halifax. In 1917, Viola, then three years old, was one of many to be injured in the Halifax Explosion, which she survived along with her entire family. Viola's father worked as a stevedore for a number of years before he became a barber.

Growing up, Desmond noted the absence of professional hair and skin-care products for black women and set her sights on addressing this need. Being of African descent, she was not allowed to train to become a beautician in Halifax, so she left and received beautician training in Montreal, Atlantic City, and one of Madam C. J. Walker's beauty schools in New York. Upon finishing her training, Desmond returned to Halifax to start her own hair salon called Vi's Studio of Beauty Culture. Her clients included Portia White and Gwen Jenkins, later the first black nurse in Nova Scotia.

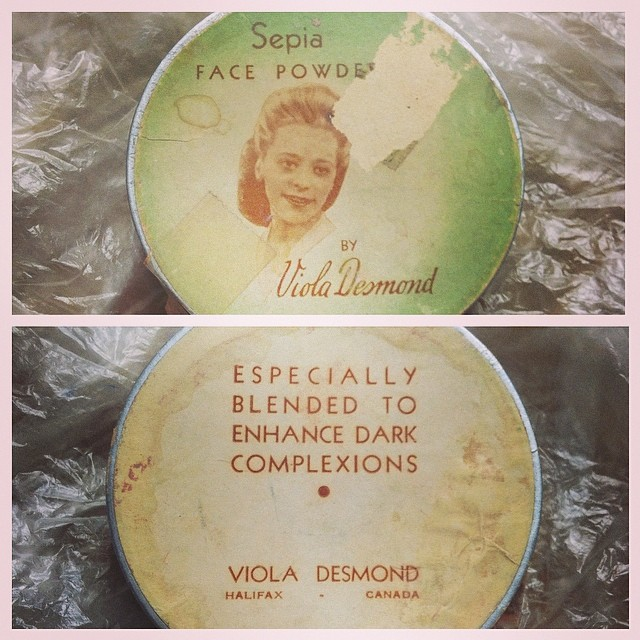
A tin of sepia face powder sold by Viola Desmond

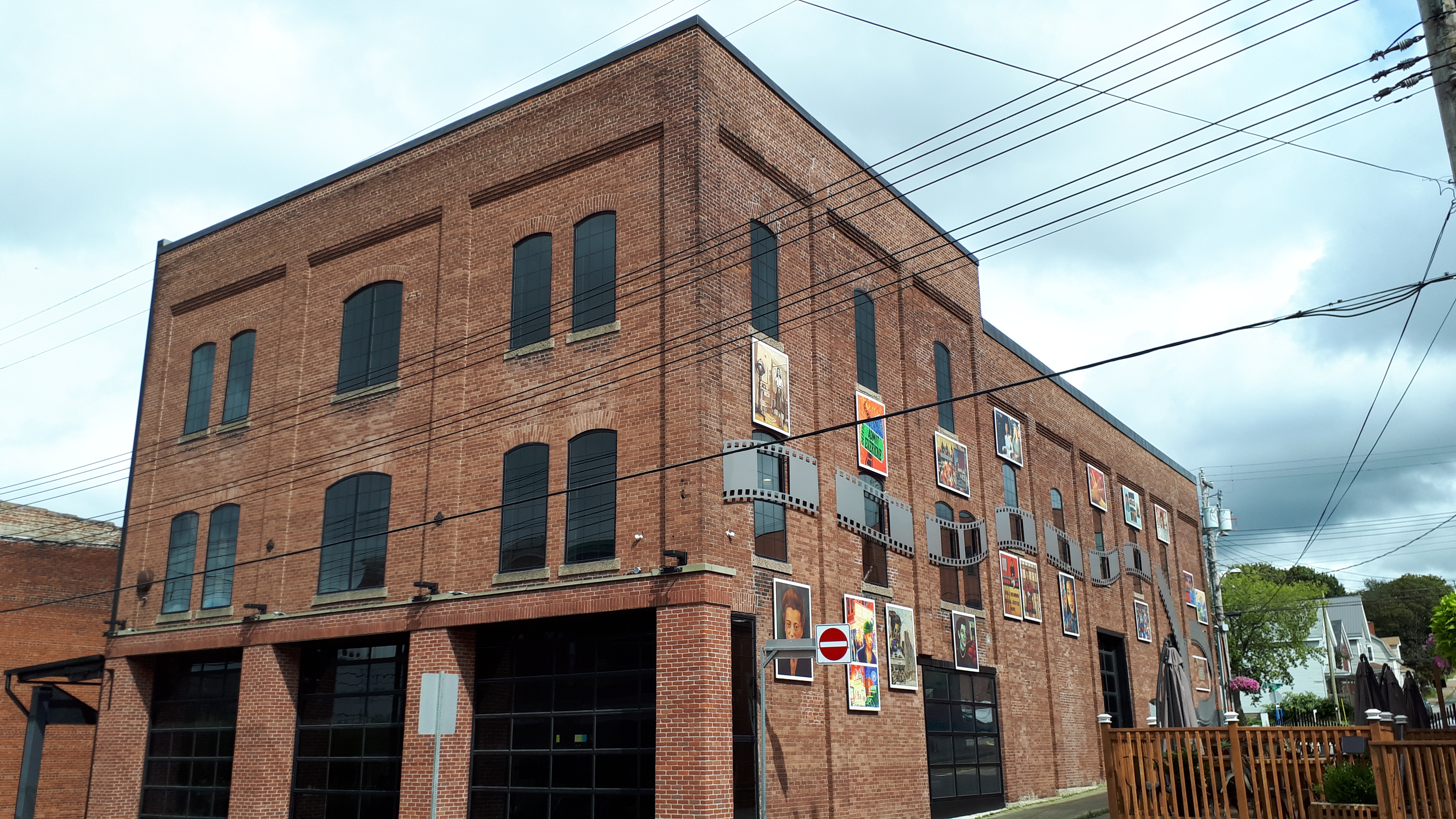
The Roseland Theatre building in New Glasgow

In addition to the salon, Desmond opened The Desmond School of Beauty Culture so that black women would not have to travel as far as they had to receive proper training. Catering to women from Nova Scotia, New Brunswick and Quebec, the school operated using a vertical integration framework. Students were provided with the skills required to open their own businesses and provide jobs for other black women within their communities. Each year as many as fifteen women graduated from the school, all of whom had been denied admission to whites-only training schools. Desmond also started her own product line, Vi's Beauty Products, which she marketed and sold herself.

=== Arrest ===
On November 8, 1946, Desmond was travelling to Sydney to market her beauty products when her car broke down in New Glasgow. While waiting for repairs, she went to see a showing of The Dark Mirror at the Roseland Film Theatre. Although Nova Scotian cinemas had no formal segregation laws, the Roseland reserved main‑floor seats for white patrons. Desmond was sold a ticket to the balcony. Unaware of the segregation, the nearsighted Desmond went to sit in the floor section, as it was close to the screen. When asked to move, she realized what was happening, and refused to move because she had a better view from the main floor. When she requested to exchange her balcony ticket to the main floor for an additional cost, she was refused and forcefully removed from the theatre, injuring her hip.

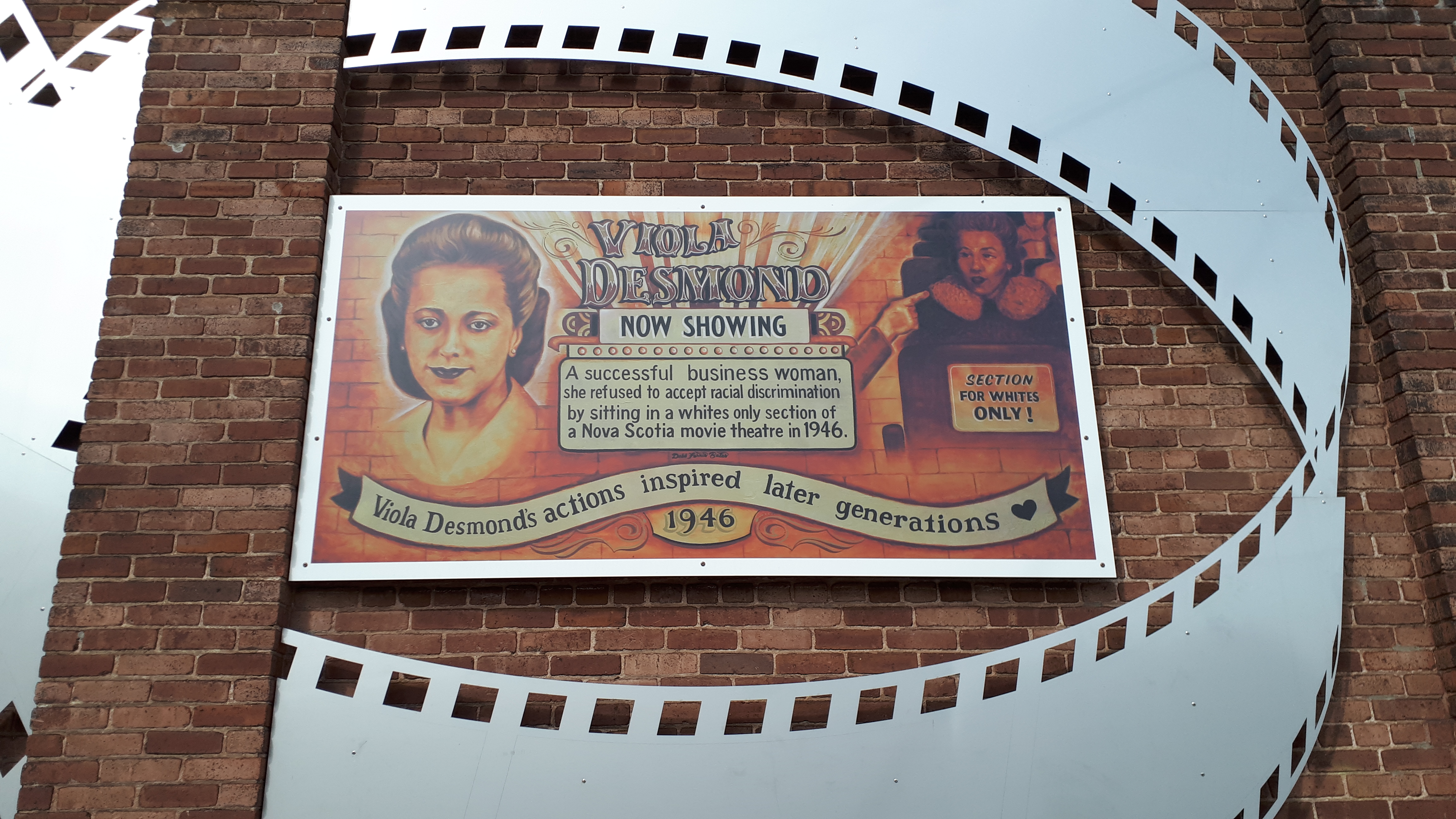
Roseland film theatre

Desmond was arrested and charged with a $26 fine for tax evasion. The balcony ticket cost 30¢ with a two‑cent tax; the floor ticket cost 40¢ with a three‑cent tax. She was convicted of depriving the government of one cent in tax. Desmond was jailed for twelve hours and was never informed about her right to legal advice, a lawyer, or bail. Upon returning to Halifax, Desmond discussed the matter with her husband, and his advice was to let it go. However, she then sought advice from the leaders of her church, the Cornwallis Street Baptist Church, where the Minister William Pearly Oliver and his wife Pearleen encouraged her to take action. With their support, Desmond decided to fight the charge in court.

=== Legal proceedings ===
Following the decision to fight the charge, Carrie Best broke the story of Desmond in the first edition of The Clarion, the first black-owned and published Nova Scotia newspaper. Best closely covered the story of Desmond on front page as she herself had previously confronted the racial segregation of the Roseland Theatre.

With the help of her church and the Nova Scotia Association for the Advancement of Coloured People (NSAACP), Desmond hired a lawyer, Frederick William Bissett, who represented her in the provincial offence trial and attempted, unsuccessfully, to file a lawsuit against the Roseland Theatre.

During subsequent proceedings, the government argued that this was a case of tax evasion. A provincial act regulating cinemas and movie theatres required the payment of an amusement tax based on the price of the theatre ticket. Since the theatre would only agree to sell Desmond a cheaper balcony ticket, but she had insisted upon sitting in the much more expensive main floor seat, she was only one cent short on tax. The statute used to convict Desmond contained no explicitly racist or discriminatory language.

Bissett's appeal rested on two grounds, both of which fell flat. First, he argued that Desmond had been denied natural justice. At the time, the scope of due process was not as clear as it has subsequently become, and Bissett's use of this concept was not accepted by the court. Second, he argued that the evidence of tax evasion was insufficient. This argument failed and was seen in hindsight as a poor approach. Several months later, a Canadian Bar Review article pointed out that Bissett could have instead argued that the courts had no right to enforce racial segregation, which would have forced a decision on the legitimacy of such an argument. When dismissing the case, Justice William Lorimer Hall said:

Had the matter reached the court by some other method than certiorari there might have been an opportunity to right the wrong done this unfortunate woman.

One wonders if the manager of the theatre who laid the complaint was so zealous because of a bona fide belief that there had been an attempt to defraud the province of Nova Scotia of the sum of one cent, or was it a surreptitious endeavour to enforce a Jim Crow rule by misuse of a public statute.

— Justice William Lorimer Hall, when dismissing Desmond's application (1947)

Her lawyer, Bissett, refused to bill Desmond, and the money was used to support William Pearly Oliver's newly established Nova Scotia Association for the Advancement of Coloured People (NSAACP).

== Later life ==
After the court cases and encounter with the legal system of Nova Scotia, her marriage ended. Desmond closed her business and moved to Montreal where she could enroll in a business college. She eventually settled in New York City, where she died from gastrointestinal bleeding on February 7, 1965, at the age of 50. She is buried at Camp Hill Cemetery in Halifax, Nova Scotia.

== Legacy ==
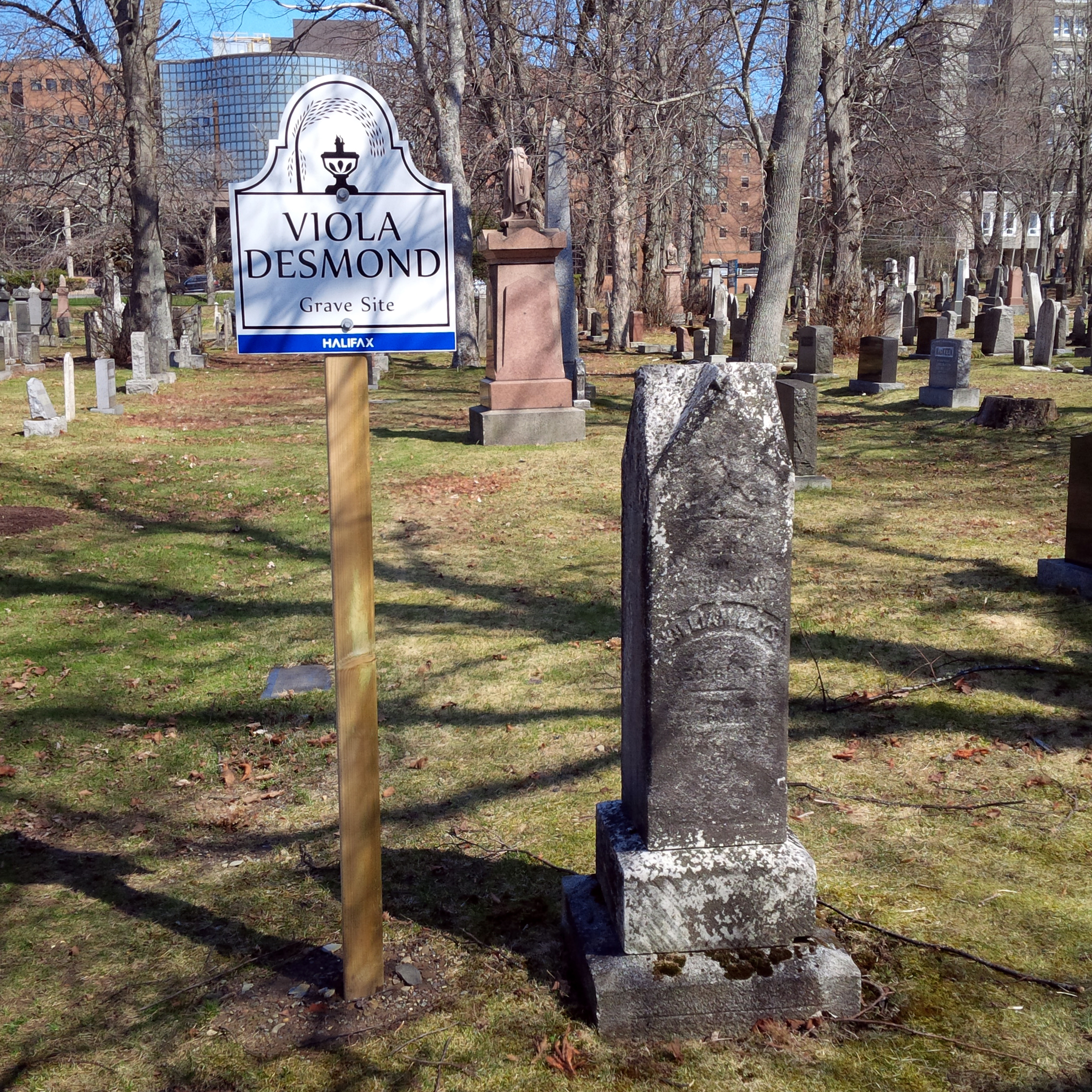
The gravesite of Viola Desmond at Camp Hill Cemetery, Halifax

William Pearly Oliver later reflected on Desmond's legacy:

... this meant something to our people. Neither before or since has there been such an aggressive effort to obtain rights. The people arose as one and with one voice. This positive stand enhanced the prestige of the Negro community throughout the Province. It is my conviction that much of the positive action that has since taken place stemmed from this ...

— William Pearly Oliver, reflecting on the case 15 years later.

Desmond is often compared to Rosa Parks, given they both challenged racism by refusing to vacate their seats in sections restricted to or prioritized for whites. Both contributed to the rise of the Civil Rights Movement, despite there having been no law specifically enforcing segregation in theatres.

== Commemorations ==
Since the early 2000s, Viola Desmond’s legacy has expanded from local memorials in Nova Scotia to national symbols such as currency and federal historic designation. Her name now appears across Canada in public spaces, educational institutions, and official state honours.

=== National recognition ===
Desmond was designated a National Historic Person of Canada on 12 January 2018.

In 2016, she was selected from more than 25,000 public nominations to appear on the Canadian ten-dollar bill, becoming the first Canadian-born woman and the first Black Canadian to appear on a regularly circulating banknote. The redesigned note was unveiled in November 2018 and features her portrait alongside imagery referencing Halifax's historic North End and the Canadian Museum for Human Rights. In 2019, the note received the Bank Note of the Year award from the International Bank Note Society.

Canada Post issued a commemorative stamp featuring Desmond in 2012. In 2019, she was featured on the Royal Canadian Mint's first Black History Month commemorative silver coin.

=== Provincial recognition ===
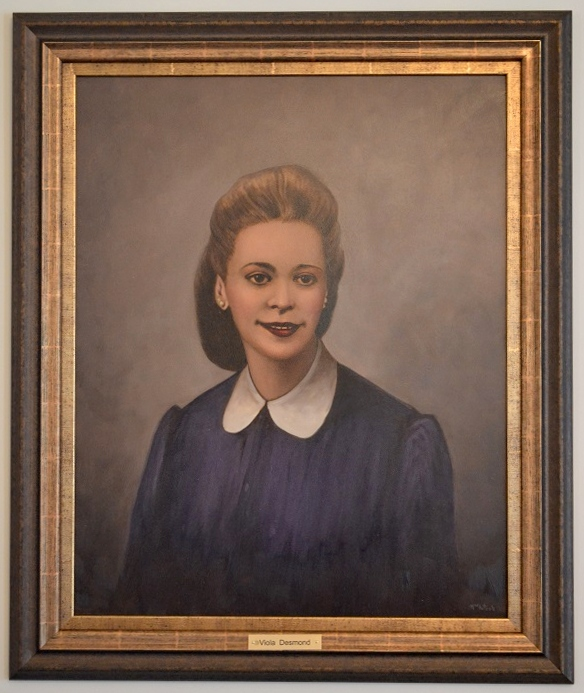
Portrait of Viola Desmond on permanent display at Government House, Halifax.

On April 15, 2010, the Government of Nova Scotia granted Desmond a posthumous free pardon and issued an official apology, acknowledging that her 1946 conviction was wrongful. This was the first posthumous free pardon granted in Canada.

In 2015, Nova Scotia established Nova Scotia Heritage Day, designating Desmond as the inaugural honouree.

Desmond's portrait is permanently displayed at Government House in Halifax.

Cape Breton University established the Viola Desmond Chair in Social Justice. The chair has been held by historian Graham Reynolds, who, alongside Wanda Robson, Desmond's younger sister, co-authored Viola Desmond: Her Life and Times and Viola Desmond's Canada: A History of Blacks and Racial Segregation in the Promised Land.

In 2009, Toronto Metropolitan University created the annual Viola Desmond Award and Bursary to recognize Black women and Black gender-diverse people who have made significant contributions to the university community.

In April 2021, the Hamilton-Wentworth District School Board announced the naming of Viola Desmond Elementary School. The school opened in September 2021 and serves students from kindergarten through Grade 8.

=== Municipal recognition ===
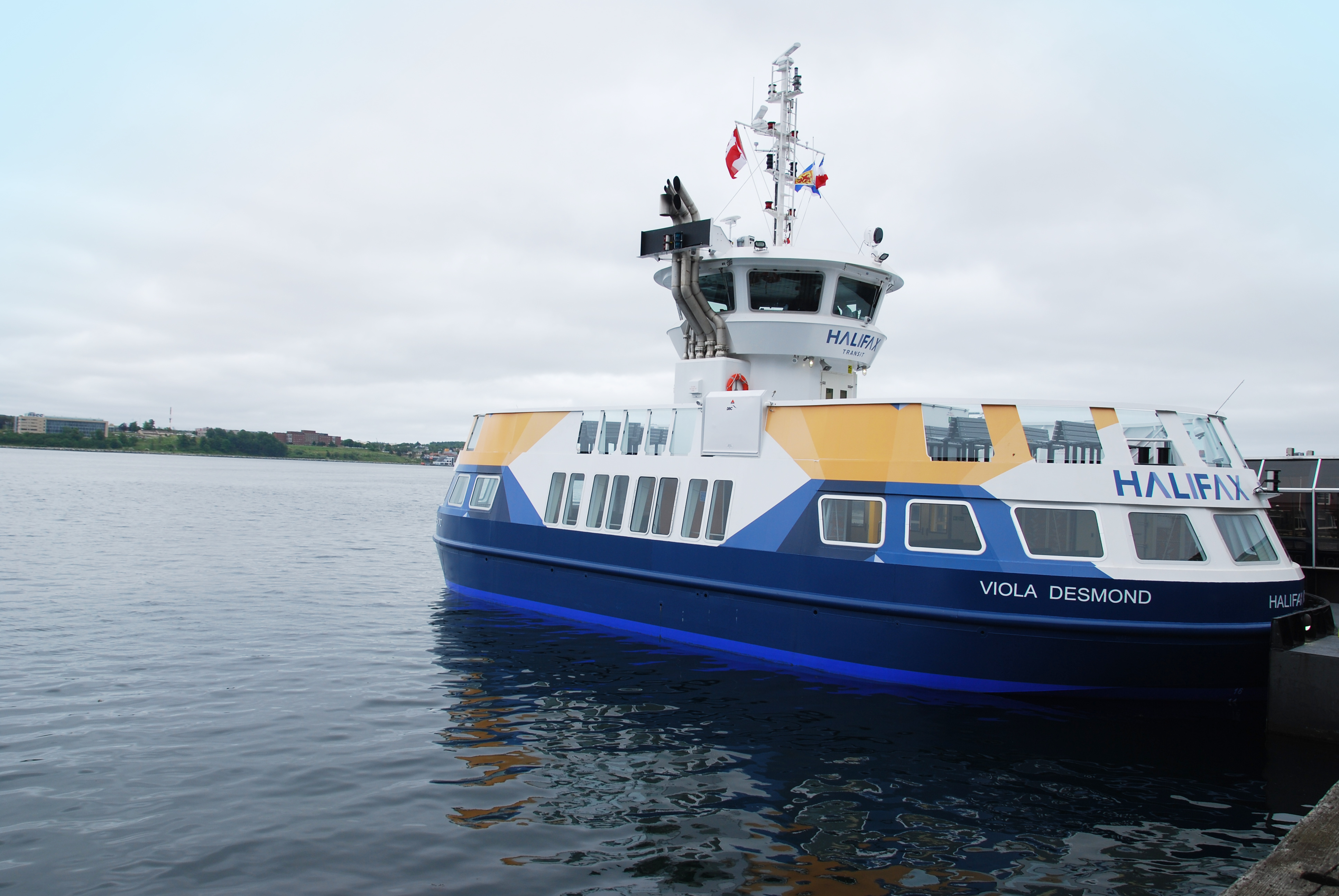
Launch of the Viola Desmond, a ferry operating in Halifax harbour

In July 2016, Halifax launched a harbour ferry named Viola Desmond, honouring her in the city where she made her stand against racial segregation.

In 2018, Canada's Walk of Fame unveiled a star in her honour at the Halifax Ferry Terminal.

That same year, the City of Toronto renamed Hupfield Park in Scarborough as Viola Desmond Park.

The Town of New Glasgow, Nova Scotia renamed a stretch of Forbes Street outside the former Roseland Theatre as Viola's Way.

In 2017, the Guelph Black Heritage Society launched the Viola Desmond Black Indigenous and People of Colour Business (BIPOC) Directory, to commemorate her achievements and support BIPOC-owned businesses in Wellington County and the Waterloo Region.

=== Cultural recognition ===
In February 2016, Desmond's story was featured as a Heritage Minute produced by Historica Canada.

In November 2022, the Toronto International Film Festival announced that the largest screening room at the TIFF Bell Lightbox would be renamed the Viola Desmond Theatre, opening in 2023.

On January 28, 2019, Temma Frecker, a teacher at The Booker School in Nova Scotia, received the Governor General's History Award for Excellence in Teaching for guiding students in a proposal to place a Cornwallis Park memorial grouping that included a statue of Desmond in dialogue with statues of Acadian Noel Doiron, Mi'kmaw Chief John Denny Jr, and Edward Cornwallis, encouraging broader public discussion about contested histories and commemoration.

== Apology and pardon ==
On April 14, 2010, the Lieutenant Governor of Nova Scotia, Mayann Francis, on the advice of Premier Darrell Dexter, invoked the royal prerogative and granted Desmond a posthumous free pardon, the first to be granted in Canada. The free pardon, an extraordinary remedy granted under the royal prerogative of mercy only in the rarest of circumstances and the first one granted posthumously, differs from a simple pardon in that it is based on innocence and recognizes that a conviction was in error. Francis, herself a Black Canadian, remarked, "here I am, 64 years later—a black woman giving freedom to another black woman".

The Premier also made an apology. Wanda Robson and Dr. Graham Reynolds, a professor of Cape Breton University, worked with Cabinet to ensure that Desmond's name was cleared; there was a public acknowledgement of the injustice and the Crown-in-Council reaffirmed its commitment to human rights. The provincial government declared in February 2015 the first Nova Scotia Heritage Day in Desmond's honour. Desmond's portrait also hangs in Government House, in Halifax.

Prompted by a request from Ontario high school student Varishini Deochand in 2021, the government of Nova Scotia offered a symbolic repayment of Desmond's original court fees to her only surviving family member, Robson. When Robson said she would use the money to make a one-time donation for a scholarship at Cape Breton University, the Crown-in-Council increased the repayment from the current valuation of $368.29 to $1,000. The provincial Crown also issued a commemorative cheque to display in the legislature. Original court costs were $26.

== See also ==
- Black Nova Scotians
- Canadian Museum for Human Rights
- Charles Daniels (activist)
- Cornwallis Street Baptist Church
- Joan Jones
- Racial segregation in Canada

== Bibliography ==
- Backhouse, Constance (1999). Colour-coded: A Legal History of Racism in Canada, 1900–1950. University of Toronto Press. ISBN 978-0-8020-8286-2.
- Walker, Barrington (2012). The African Canadian Legal Odyssey: Historical Essays. University of Toronto Press. ISBN 978-1-4426-4689-6.
