= Environmental racism in Nova Scotia =

Environmental Racism in Nova Scotia are the environmental injustices in the province that have an unequal effect on racial minorities.

Environmental racism is a term used in the environmental justice movement to describe environmental injustices that disproportionately affect racialized communities. For many decades, environmental activists have drawn attention to various examples of environmental racism in the Canadian province of Nova Scotia, especially those injustices faced by Black and Indigenous communities. A frequent example of environmental racism in Nova Scotia is the disproportionate siting of toxic facilities such as landfills, thermal generating stations, and paper mills in marginalized communities. Accordingly, a 2002 study found that over 30% of Black residents in Nova Scotia live within a 5 km (3.1 mi) radius of a landfill. Environmental racism in Nova Scotia is a source of multigenerational trauma—there is scientific evidence linking the presence of toxic facilities to water insecurity, higher rates of various illnesses (especially cancers), and other harms to physical and mental health wellbeing.

== Notable cases ==
=== Africville ===
Africville, a predominantly Black community founded in the 1800s, is the most historic example of environmental racism in Nova Scotia. Even though residents paid taxes, the City of Halifax discriminated against the community by refusing to provide basic amenities including sewage, waste disposal, and clean water. An infectious disease hospital and landfill were built near Africville, increasing residents' exposure to environmental harms. After multiple requests for municipal services, the City relocated and razed the community without thorough consultation. The relocation was poorly coordinated and left many residents without adequate housing or support structures. The City of Halifax apologized for the razing of the community in 2010.

=== Lincolnville ===
Residents in the primarily African Canadian town of Lincolnville protested the 2006 opening of a second-generation landfill, part of the Nova Scotian government's budgetary plan to amalgamate landfill sites. The site previously hosted a first-generation landfill for over 30 years, which had also been a source of frustration for the community as it lacked the necessary liners to prevent toxic runoff. Residents cite the indifference of the local government, a lack of employment opportunities, and allegedly high rates of cancer in the town as examples of environmental racism against the Lincolnville community. A local community group opposed to the new landfill was often ignored or denied the opportunity to share their concerns with city councillors after the landfill became operational

=== Shelburne ===
In Shelburne, African Nova Scotian residents are concentrated near a landfill that was used for industrial, medical, and residential waste for over 75 years. Although the landfill has been closed for nearly 30 years, toxic waste has gradually leaked into the community's primary water sources over time. Additionally, the site was used as a transfer station for oil barrels and other industrial waste up until 2016. This environmental hazard has resulted in long-lasting damage to the physical and mental health of the Black community in Shelburne.

=== Stewiacke ===
The Alton Gas Storage Project at Stewiacke, first proposed in 2007, aimed to use water from the Shubenacadie River to flush salt deposits in order to store natural gas. The placement of the natural gas deposits would violate Indigenous treaty rights as the river is the center of Mi'kmaq territory and culture. Further, the project posed significant environmental risks by restricting access to clean water and culling wildlife populations. The project was cancelled in October 2021 after years of protests led by grassroots Indigenous movements and environmental activists.

== Responses ==
=== Ingrid Waldron ===
Canadian sociologist Ingrid Waldron researches the impact of environmental racism on the physical and mental health and social wellbeing of Black and Mi'kmaq communities, including her work through the ENRICH Project and her 2018 book There's Something in the Water and its accompanying film. Waldron also worked with former Nova Scotian MP Lenore Zann to attempt to introduce a National Strategy to Redress Environmental Racism Act combating environmental racism.

Bill C-230

On June 22, 2021, Canada's Parliament passed Bill C-230. The purpose of the bill is to establish a framework for the federal government to address issues related to environmental racism and environmental justice. In the preamble, the bill outlines several recurring themes associated with these issues, including the disproportionate exposure of marginalized communities to environmental hazards and the siting of hazardous facilities in areas primarily inhabited by these communities. The legislation encourages public engagement in the development of policies aimed at reducing environmental racism. It mandates that the Minister of the Environment develop a strategy to prevent, mitigate, and evaluate environmental racism and promote environmental justice. The bill also requires collaboration with local organizations, Indigenous communities, and other relevant governmental representatives. Additionally, any actions undertaken must be consistent with the United Nations Declaration on the Rights of Indigenous Peoples. The bill represents a legislative approach to addressing concerns related to environmental equity in Canada.
