= Shelburne, Nova Scotia =

Shelburne
- Town
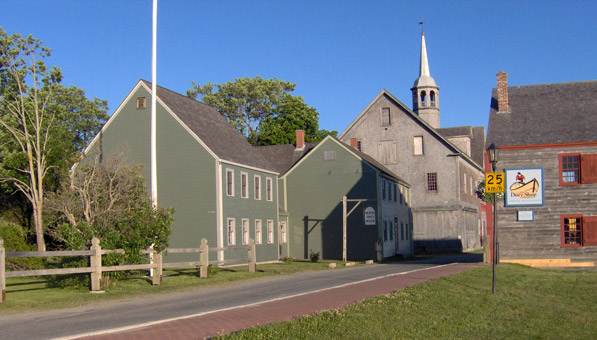
- The Shelburne County Museum

- Seal
- Motto: Where Canada's history comes alive
- Location of Shelburne in Nova Scotia
- Coordinates: 43.763333°N 65.323611°W
- Country: Canada
- Province: Nova Scotia
- County: Shelburne
- Founded: 1783
- Incorporated: April 4, 1907

Government
  - Type: Town of Shelburne Council
  - Mayor: Stanley (Tanny) Jacklin
  - MLA: Nolan Young (PC)
  - MP: Jessica Fancy (L)

Area (2021)
  - Land: 8.75 km^{2} (3.38 sq mi)
- Highest elevation: 6 m (20 ft)
- Lowest elevation: 0 m (0 ft)

Population (2021)
  - Total: 1,644
  - Density: 187.9/km^{2} (487/sq mi)
  - Change (2016-21): ▼5.7%
  - Dwellings: 917
- Time zone: UTC-4 (AST)
  - Summer (DST): UTC-3 (ADT)
- Postal code(s): B0T 1W0
- Area code(s): 902 & 782
- Access Routes: Trunk 3
- Website: www.shelburnens.ca

Shelburne is a town located in southwestern Nova Scotia, Canada.

== History ==
Shelburne lies at the southwest corner of Nova Scotia, at roughly the same latitude as Portland, Maine, in the United States. The Mi'kmaq call the large and well-sheltered harbour Logumkeegan or Sogumkeagum.

The first settlers arrived in the Shelburne region around 13,000 years ago. The Mi'kmaq First Nations travelled by canoe along the Roseway River, setting up encampments along the shores in summer. Mi'kmaq residents referred to Shelburne's sheltered harbour as Logumkeegan or Sogumkeagum. Prior to the arrival of Europeans in the 1500s, the territory of Mi'kma'ki was divided into seven districts, each led by a District Chief.

The displacement of the Nova Scotia's Mi'kmaq communities consists of a long and painful history including the introduction of European diseases in the 1500s, the occupation of unceded land, as well as removal of Indigenous children from their homes in the 20th century through the Sixties Scoop and Residential School program. Nova Scotia eventually set aside 26,000 acres as reserve land owned by the Canadian Government.

Indigenous communities continue to inhabit Shelburne and surrounding communities, and the Acadia First Nation has opened a sub-office office in Shelburne to serve off-reserve members in this region.

When European settlers arrived in Shelburne, they followed Indigenous Mi'kmaq routes to fish, hunt and trap. Initial foreign explorers included fishermen from Spain, Portugal, and France. Following the arrival of Samuel de Champlain, French settlers began to arrive in Nova Scotia between 1632 and 1653, with some forming the fishing settlement of Port Razoir in Shelburne. Ownership of these Acadian colonies moved between French and English rule until the War of Spanish Succession ended in 1713, turning Nova Scotian Acadians over to the British.

Following the Acadians' repeated refusal to fight the French, the British Governor and Nova Scotia council began to deport the Acadians of Grand Pre and Port Royal in 1755. Some families took refuge in the Cape Sable region (comprising Yarmouth and Shelburne) until this community, too, was sent into exile between 1756 and 1759.

During this period, homes and communities were destroyed and burned, and Acadian families were separated and forcibly moved throughout the American colonies or into Europe. Many of Shelburne County's Acadian residents landed in Massachusetts, and throughout the Grand Derangement some were imprisoned, some died at sea, others fled to Quebec, New Brunswick, Prince Edward Island, or sought shelter with Nova Scotia's Mi'kmaq communities. By 1764, small groups of Acadians were allowed to return-and most reside today within the Maritimes.

In 1783, 10,000 enslaved persons (a fifth of the United States' black population) fought alongside British soldiers in the American Revolution-promised freedom in return. Departing from New York, many Loyalists relocated to Nova Scotia at the end of the war, with 5,000 arriving in Shelburne Harbour in the first wave. About 1,500 Black Loyalists settled in Shelburne County and Birchtown, to the west, became the largest community of free black people anywhere in North America. Upon arrival, Black Loyalists waited for land grants from the British authorities that were delayed, smaller, and in worse locations than their white counterparts. Many Black Loyalists were forced into indentured servitude, little different from the conditions they had escaped; some were kidnapped and sold back into slavery further south.

By 1784, the population of Port Roseway (now the Town of Shelburne) reached 10,000-larger than Halifax or Montreal, and housing some of New York's wealthiest families. With this growth, industries began to develop including cod and whale fishing, and lumber and timber trades. But tensions were soon on the upswing, with Nova Scotian slave owners feeling threatened by the presence of these freed Black Loyalists, and white refugees frustrated at trying to compete for work, unwilling to accept such low compensations.

On July 26, 1784, a mob of white Loyalists settlers stormed the home of a black preacher in Shelburne armed with hooks and chains stolen from harboured ships, inciting North America's first race riot. Only one person was ever charged in connection with these riots, and the event is considered reflective of the broader racist prejudices encountered by Black Loyalists throughout Nova Scotia for the years to come.

In 1786 the first ship was built on Shelburne's harbour. Commissary Island (once holding rations dispensed to Loyalists) and Black's Brook became shipyards, leading the way for many other builders. In the 19th century, the river was repurposed for log driving, with temporary dams constructed along the stream. This wealth didn't last long though, and the Shelburne economy quickly began to decline.

Many Black Loyalists settled elsewhere across the province, and in 1791, at least half of Birchtown's residents agreed to depart for a new colony in Sierra Leone. The agricultural prospects in Shelburne were weak, and transportation links to the rest of the province were limited, leading to an eventual decline. By the 1820s, the population of Shelburne declined to 300.

Another period of immigration began in 1818 when a mass of Welsh immigrants founded the first Welsh settlement in Canada, along the west side of the river in what is now Welshtown.

Shelburne was incorporated as a town in 1907. Shelburne's historic waterfront has attracted film productions, with many remaining buildings dating back to the 18th and 19th centuries, including the Shelburne County Museum, Christ Church, and Ross-Thomson House. Fishing is still a primary industry in the Town of Shelburne, and other local industries include lumber, fish processing, barrel manufacturing, granite monuments, and marine supplies. While ship building is no longer a major employer, visitors can visit the J. C. Williams Dory Shop to witness construction methods of the late 19th century.

=== Port Razoir, Cape/Port Roseway, Shelburne ===
The first Europeans to make a settlement on these shores were the French Acadians. They set up a small fishing settlement known as Port Razoir in the late 17th century, named after the harbour's resemblance to an open razor. Early European settlers had small subsistence farms, but most of the inhabitants' income from that time to the present has been derived from the sea. The Acadian fishing settlement was abandoned after repeated raids from New England colonists during Queen Anne's War in 1705, in which five Acadians were taken prisoner, and again in 1708.

On May 14, 1715, New England naval commander Cyprian Southack attempted to create a permanent fishing station at a place he named "Cape Roseway" (now known as Shelburne). Shortly after he set up a base, in July 1715 the Mi'kmaq raided the station and burned it to the ground. In response, Southack led a raid on Canso, Nova Scotia (1718) and encouraged Governor Phillips to fortify Canso.

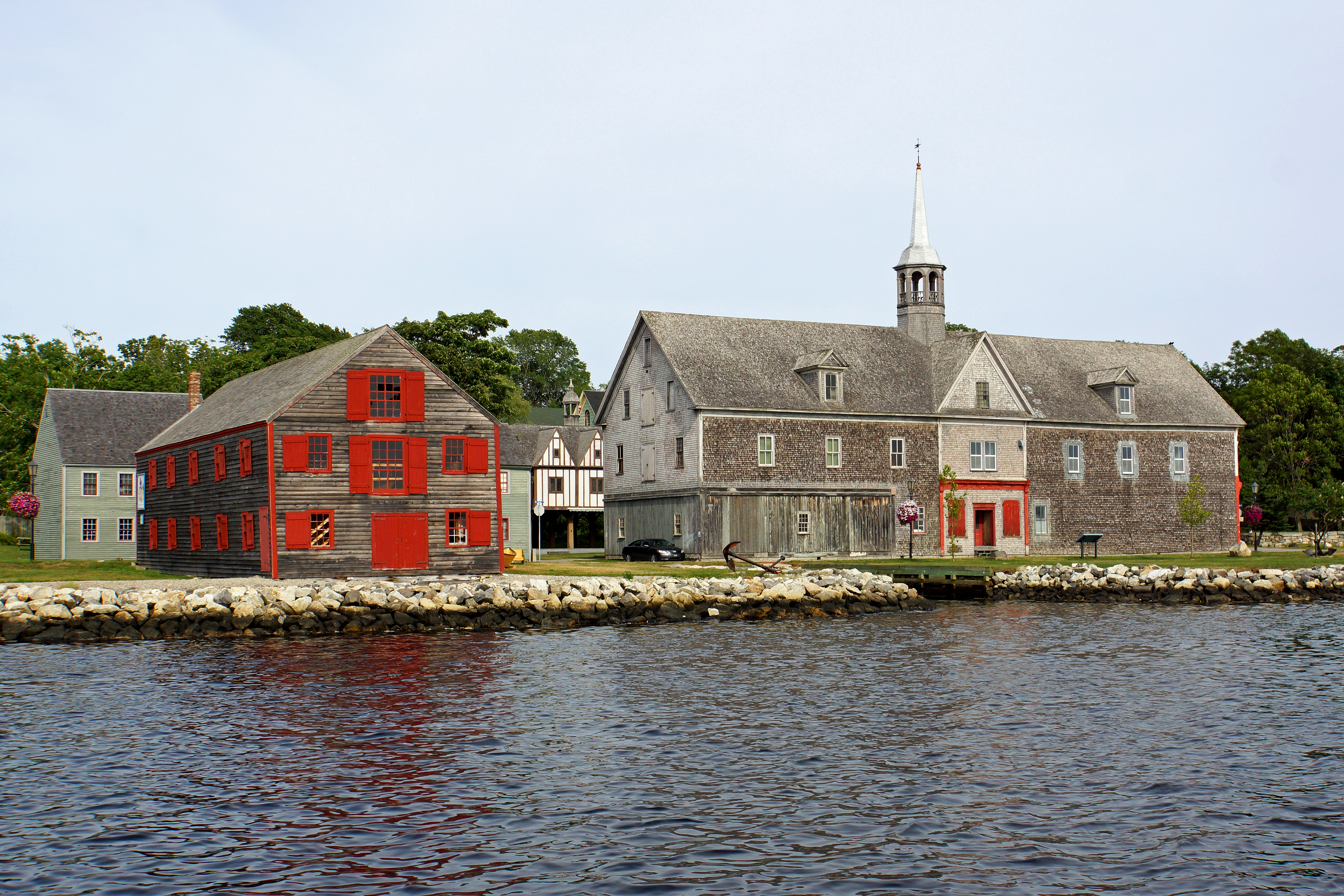
The Cox Warehouse on Dock Street, Shelburne, Nova Scotia.

New England fishermen knew Shelburne as "Port Roseway" and frequently used the outer harbour for seasonal shelter and repairs. Pirate Ned Low raided the New England fishing fleet at Shelburne Harbour in 1723, capturing 13 ships and taking Philip Ashton captive. After the forced expulsion of the Acadians in 1755, there were no European settlers for several decades. Alexander McNutt attempted to start a settlement in 1765 but was not successful.

=== American Revolution ===
In the spring of 1783, more than 5,000 settlers arrived on the shores of Shelburne Harbour from New York and the Middle Colonies of the Thirteen Colonies. These settlers were Loyalists (referred to later in Canada as United Empire Loyalists), Anglo-American colonists who had opposed the Revolution and remained loyal to Britain. The Crown offered them free land, tools, and provisions as compensation to lure them to settle in this relatively undeveloped area. Four hundred families associated to form a town at Port Roseway, which Governor John Parr renamed Shelburne later that year, after Lord Shelburne, the British prime minister. This group was led by the Port Roseway Associates, who had formed while still in New York and petitioned Governor Parr for the land.

The Black Loyalists, a large group of enslaved African Americans who escaped their masters to British lines and were promised freedom, were evacuated and transported by British forces to Shelburne Harbour at the same time. They founded Birchtown to the west of Shelburne. It became North America's largest free black settlement. But the Black Loyalists had to endure long waits before receiving land, were granted less than the whites, and faced discrimination from other colonists, including some who had even taken enslaved people with them to Canada. In July 1784 some of the white Loyalists conducted the Shelburne Riots against the African Americans.

In the fall of 1783, a second wave of settlers arrived in Shelburne. The community was settled by Loyalists soldiers of the Duke of Cumberland's Regiment. By 1784, the population of this new community is estimated to have been 17,000, making it the fourth-largest city in North America. But, initial hopes were short-lived; the settlement suffered from a lack of viable agricultural land, poor inland transportation links, and too few pioneers who knew how to develop frontier property. These problems curtailed its economic growth. The population fell sharply by the 1790s, leaving many abandoned buildings. However, the remaining residents gradually developed the harbour potential as a fishing and shipbuilding centre.

In 1792 more than 1,000 Black Loyalists from across Nova Scotia accepted a British offer to resettle in Freetown (current Sierra Leone), a newly founded British colony in West Africa. They became the core of an ethnic group that became known as Krios (for Creoles), which included numerous black poor of London (many of them also African Americans resettled after the American Revolution), formerly enslaved persons resettled from Jamaica, and persons liberated from illegal trading ships after Britain and the United States prohibited the Atlantic slave trade.

== Shipbuilding ==
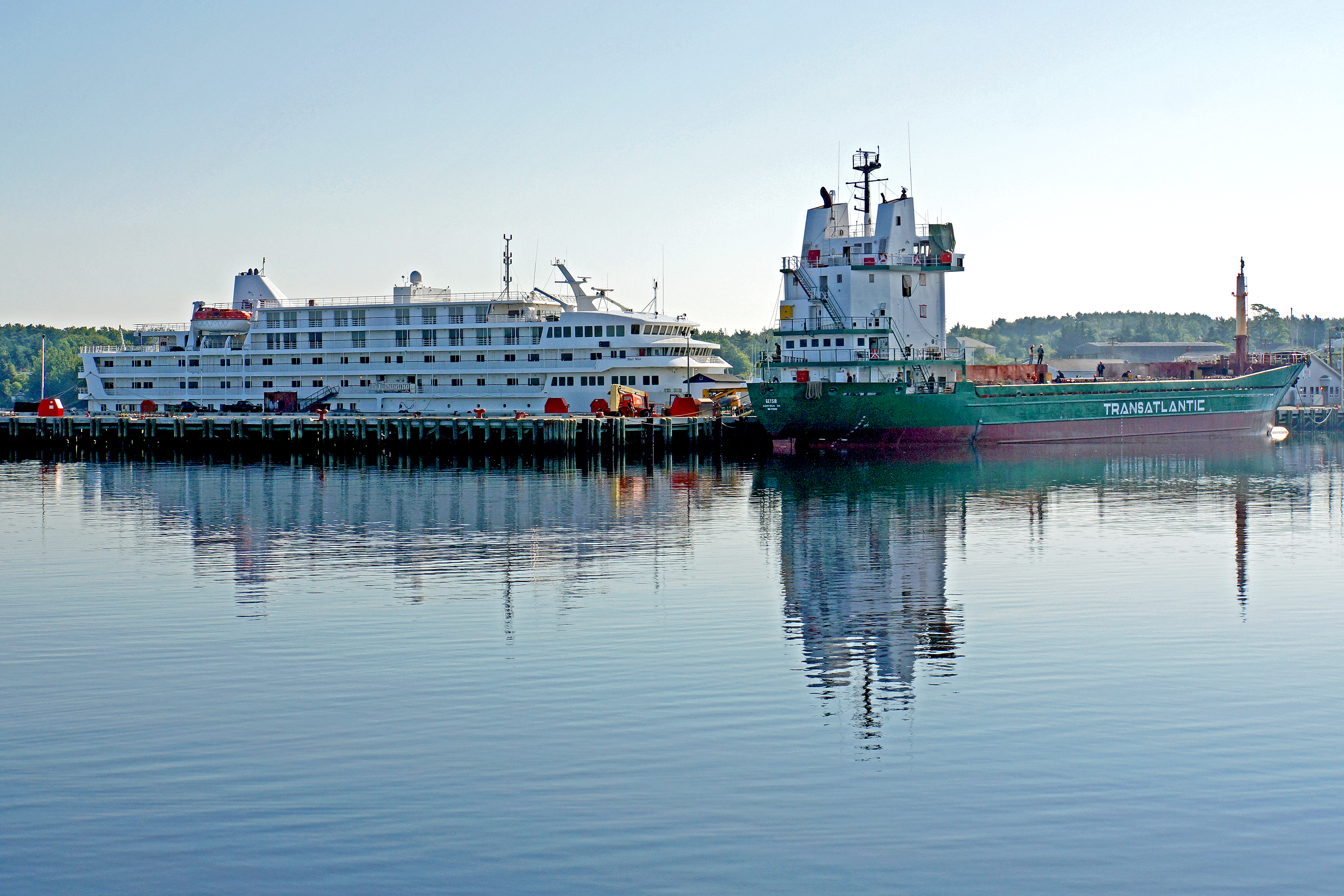
Shelburne Shipyard in 2012

Shipbuilding is a historically significant industry in the area. The first vessel launched at Shelburne was the 181-ton Roseway, built for MacLean and Bogle in 1786. Commissary Island, now a peninsula, was the area from which supplies of flour, pork, and salt were dispensed to the Loyalists by the Commissary General, Mr. Brinley. Later, this area became the shipyard of Joseph McGill. The Cox family also built their own ships and conducted extensive international trade. The former MacKay shipyard was located in Shelburne at Black's Brook. Donald McKay, famous in the United States for the clippers which he built at Boston, began his shipbuilding career in Shelburne. He was born at Jordan Falls in 1810 and left the area at the age of 16 to apprentice in New York. Led by master shipbuilders such as Amos Pentz and James Havelock Harding, Shelburne shipyards built many fishing schooners in the banks fishing era, as well as a notable research yacht inspired by fishing schooners, the schooner Blue Dolphin in 1926.

In May 1945, following Germany's surrender, U-889 surrendered to the Royal Canadian Navy at Shelburne, Nova Scotia.

== Buildings ==
Many of Shelburne's buildings date back to Loyalist times. The Shelburne County Museum is a restored home built in 1787 by David Nairn, a cooper from Scotland. The present-day Christ Church (Anglican) is on the site of the original building of the same name, which was designed by Loyalist Isaac Hildreth and consecrated by Bishop Charles Inglis in 1790. The original structure was destroyed by fire in 1971. Tottie's Store is thought to have been built by John Tottie about the year 1800. At each corner of the intersection of Water Street and George Street, sit dwellings that were built in 1783.

In 1787, government distribution of provisions to the new settlers was terminated. As the settlement was not yet self-supporting, many settlers put their houses up for sale or abandoned them. They left for England, New Brunswick, Upper Canada, and the United States. About half the population of African Americans left, many going to the new colony of Freetown in West Africa (now Sierra Leone). By the 1820s, the population of Shelburne had dwindled to about 300.

== Present day ==
Shelburne was incorporated as a town on April 4, 1907. Some descendants of the first-generation immigrant Loyalists still live in the area today.

Fishing remains the primary industry with approximately 9.5 million pounds of fish passing through the port annually. Other economic activities include tourism, aquaculture, fish processing, and the manufacture of barrels, granite monuments, and marine supplies.

In late 2011, Irving was awarded the largest-ever government shipbuilding contract, valued at approximately $35 billion. This is chiefly for work at their Halifax Shipyard, but some work is expected to be done at the Shelburne yard over the 30-year term of the contract.

Cooke Aquaculture chose Shelburne as a site for a salmon farming operation. Plans are to increase the number of farms in the area to eight or more and construct a fish processing plant employing 350 people. In February 2012, the Canadian Food Inspection Agency quarantined one site due to a suspected outbreak of infectious salmon anemia (ISA).

The area is served by a weekly newspaper, The Tri-County Vanguard out of Yarmouth, a large online news operation, radio stations east and west of the town and CBC radio from Halifax, and the regional version of The Chronicle Herald.

Previous local newspapers included The Coast Guard, published in a building at the same intersection where newspapers were to have been published starting in 1784. Prior ones include the General Advertiser, the Port Roseway Gazetteer and Shelburne Advertiser, and the American Gazette.

On October 19, 2024, Stanley “Tanny” Jacklin was elected mayor, becoming the town’s first mayor of Black descent.

== Climate ==
Shelburne has a warm-summer humid continental climate (Köppen climate classification Dfb) that is similar to many locations in southern Nova Scotia and coastal locations of northern New England. Due to its coastal location and the moderating influence of the Atlantic Ocean, Shelburne's climate is relatively temperate without major extremes in temperature. Winters are wet and cold, with snow, freezing rain, and rain frequent from mid-December to the end of March. Despite this, average Maximum temperatures averages above 0 °C (32 °F) every month of the year, unusual for any location in Eastern Canada. Snow is common in the winter months; however, it rarely accumulates on the ground for extended periods of time. Snowstorms often change through freezing rain and then rain, thus melting accumulated snow. Following a winter storm, the air often turns clear but cold. Spring is cool and frequently damp, while summer features heavy morning fogs in June and early July, usually followed by clear, warm days until the end of September. Autumn weather features pleasant days and cool nights, which can extend well into November. Due to the moderating influence of the Atlantic Ocean, autumn weather can often extend into late November or early December. Snowfall that lies on the ground is uncommon until January and Shelburne are susceptible to strong coastal storms called Nor'easters, which bring heavy rains, pounding surf and damaging winds. These can occur from mid-autumn to spring. Shelburne is also susceptible to hurricanes, which can occasionally affect the area from August to October.

Climate data for Shelburne, NS
Month	Jan	Feb	Mar	Apr	May	Jun	Jul	Aug	Sep	Oct	Nov	Dec	Year
Record high °C (°F)	13.9 (57.0)	14 (57)	18.3 (64.9)	25.6 (78.1)	31.1 (88.0)	34.5 (94.1)	33.3 (91.9)	36.1 (97.0)	27.8 (82.0)	24.5 (76.1)	20.6 (69.1)	15 (59)	36.1 (97.0)
Mean daily maximum °C (°F)	0.9 (33.6)	1 (34)	5 (41)	10 (50)	15.4 (59.7)	19.9 (67.8)	23.1 (73.6)	23.1 (73.6)	19.3 (66.7)	14.1 (57.4)	9 (48)	4.1 (39.4)	12.1 (53.8)
Daily mean °C (°F)	−3.7 (25.3)	−3.5 (25.7)	0.5 (32.9)	5.2 (41.4)	9.9 (49.8)	14.3 (57.7)	17.6 (63.7)	17.6 (63.7)	13.9 (57.0)	9 (48)	4.6 (40.3)	−0.5 (31.1)	7.1 (44.8)
Mean daily minimum °C (°F)	−8.3 (17.1)	−8 (18)	−4 (25)	0.3 (32.5)	4.4 (39.9)	8.7 (47.7)	12.1 (53.8)	12.1 (53.8)	8.4 (47.1)	3.9 (39.0)	0.2 (32.4)	−5 (23)	2.1 (35.8)
Record low °C (°F)	−22.8 (−9.0)	−23.4 (−10.1)	−24 (−11)	−9.4 (15.1)	−4.4 (24.1)	0.5 (32.9)	3.3 (37.9)	2.4 (36.3)	−3.5 (25.7)	−7.8 (18.0)	−14.3 (6.3)	−24.6 (−12.3)	−24.6 (−12.3)
Average precipitation mm (inches)	151.3 (5.96)	107.3 (4.22)	121.5 (4.78)	123 (4.8)	96.3 (3.79)	102.7 (4.04)	105.6 (4.16)	82.3 (3.24)	101.9 (4.01)	112.5 (4.43)	132.1 (5.20)	156.6 (6.17)	1,393.1 (54.85)
Average rainfall mm (inches)	104.5 (4.11)	75.5 (2.97)	93 (3.7)	115.1 (4.53)	96.2 (3.79)	102.7 (4.04)	105.6 (4.16)	82.3 (3.24)	101.9 (4.01)	110.4 (4.35)	126.4 (4.98)	123.3 (4.85)	1,236.9 (48.70)
Average snowfall cm (inches)	49.6 (19.5)	31.3 (12.3)	26.5 (10.4)	7.4 (2.9)	0.1 (0.0)	0 (0)	0 (0)	0 (0)	0 (0)	2 (0.8)	5.6 (2.2)	31.7 (12.5)	154.2 (60.7)
Source: climate.weatheroffice.ec.gc.ca

== Demographics ==
Historical population
Year	Pop.	±%
1784	10,000	—
1901	1,445	−85.5%
1911	1,435	−0.7%
1921	1,360	−5.2%
1931	1,474	+8.4%
1941	1,605	+8.9%
1951	2,040	+27.1%
1956	2,337	+14.6%
1961	2,408	+3.0%
1981	2,303	−4.4%
1986	2,312	+0.4%
1991	2,245	−2.9%
1996	2,132	−5.0%
2001	2,013	−5.6%
2006	1,879	−6.7%
2011	1,686	−10.3%
2016	1,743	+3.4%
2021	1,644	−5.7%

In the 2021 Census of Population conducted by Statistics Canada, Shelburne had a population of 1,644 living in 794 of its 917 total private dwellings, a change of −5.7% from its 2016 population of 1,743. With a land area of 8.75 km^{2} (3.38 sq mi), it had a population density of 187.9/km^{2} (486.6/sq mi) in 2021.

== Environmental hazards ==
In 1946 the Morvan Road Landfill was established in the Patterson's Division of the Town of Shelburne, in direct proximity to the African Nova Scotian community living in the south-end of town. The roots of these communities were established after the 1776 American Revolutionary War which forced the relocation and settlement of Black Loyalists to Canadian lands. The placement of this landfill in direct proximity to minority communities represents an issue of environmental racism, especially when these communities face disproportionate effects to these hazards and have less political power to fight against the issue.

The landfill was used for various types of waste including industrial, medical, and residential. The burning of waste over decades created ample amounts of air pollution which were breathed in by surrounding communities, raising major health concerns. This directly affected the quality of life for these communities as the burning of the waste gave off wretched smells causing the inability to breathe, unable to go outside, needing to change their clothes multiple times, and unable to perform daily acts. Considering the waste dump was uphill of residential homes, run-off from waste would contaminate water resources used by the community. This again raised concerns regarding the health of citizens, questions surrounding increased carcinogens, and cancerous death rates within the community.

The Environmental Noxiousness, Racial Inequities & Community Health Project (the ENRICH Project), conducted research within the community to display that waste dumps are disproportionately located in African Nova Scotian and Miꞌkmaq communities throughout Nova Scotia which have been highlighted as examples of environmental racism in Nova Scotia. They found evidence that these communities suffer from increased rates of cancer, respiratory illnesses, and other chronic diseases. The collaboration of the ENRICH Project with local communities sparked ideas of creating a grassroots movement amongst community members. They founded the South End Environmental Injustice Society (SEED), a nonprofit community initiative that represents a response to establishment of the landfill near the African Nova Scotian and low-income community in Shelburne.

SEED allowed members of the community to express their concerns regarding the Morvan Road Landfill, forming partnerships to address these issues. Further raising awareness about health concerns, they conducted research to determine the link between cancer rates within the African Nova Scotian communities in the south end. Their community map discovered the higher prevalence of cancer amongst African men in comparison to the general community, pushing them to discover why the proximity impacts both physical and mental health concerns. SEED collaborated with the ENRICH project to conduct research on the water quality, in search of contaminants that might explain the increased cancer rates. This collaboration not only provided statistical evidence but allowed their voices to be heard at a government level. After the completion of inspections in June 2016, they closed the dump to waste outside of community disposal. SEED, along with other community members, continued their efforts after concern of the landfill still affecting community health, eventually leading to the closure of the landfill in December 2016.

This has since moved toward combating "environmental racism" in Canada as a whole, leading to the establishment of Bill C-230.

== Film production ==
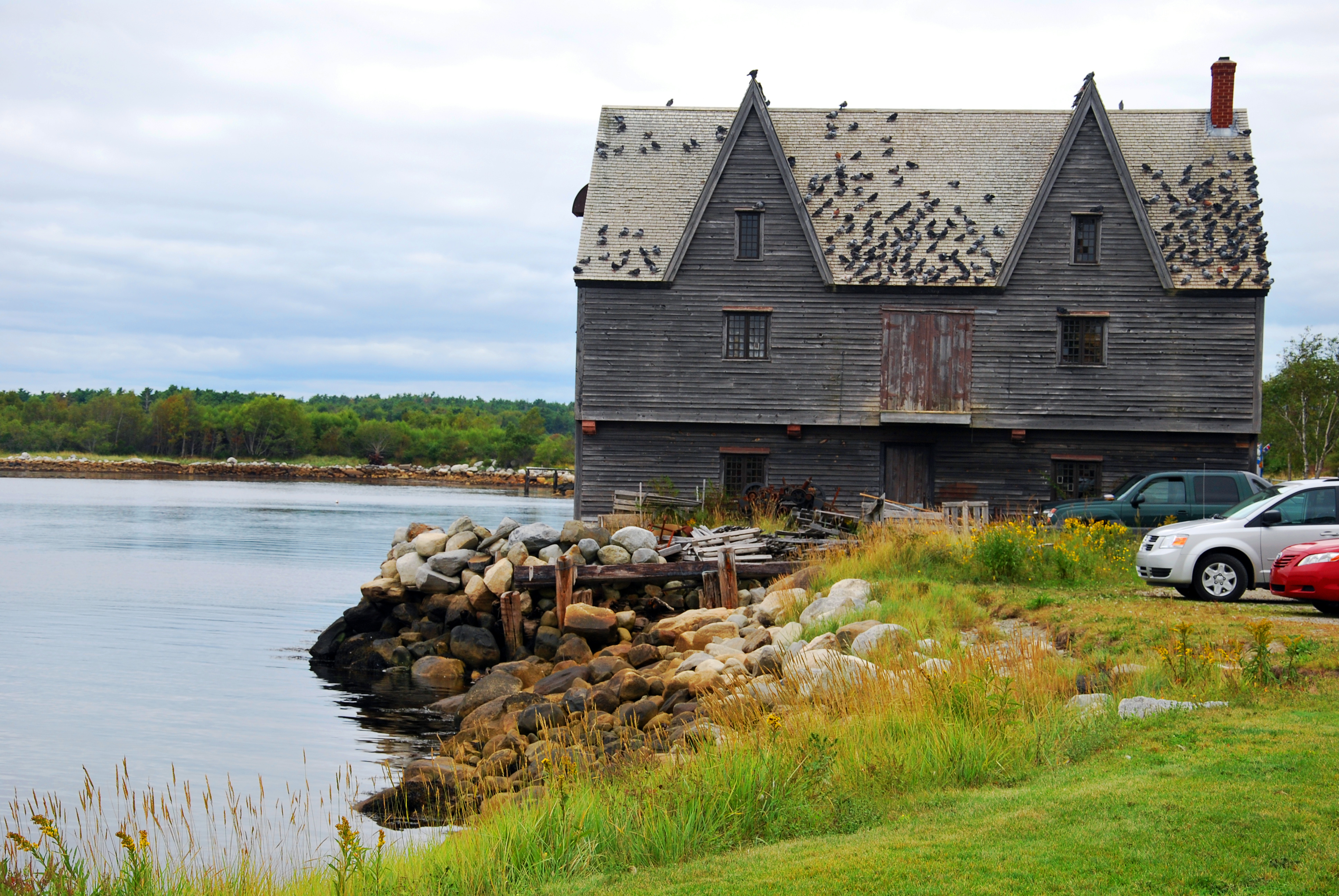
Present day barrel factory

In 1992, Dock Street was the location for the filming of Mary Silliman's War, based on the life of Mary Silliman and depicting Fairfield, Connecticut, during the American Revolution. In 1994, Dock Street was the location of the film The Scarlet Letter, based on Nathaniel Hawthorne's novel about Puritan New England in the mid-17th century. Some of the buildings on Dock Street still retain the grey-tone paint finishes used for the film.

Other movies made in Shelburne have been Virginia's Run and Wilby Wonderful. In 2008 an old naval station in the Shelburne area was sold to a group who planned to make more movies at a sound stage located on the station; they sold the complex for other purposes. In 2009, filming for portions of the two-part TV miniseries, Moby Dick, was carried out in Shelburne. A recreation of the Whaleman's Chapel was constructed on the waterfront and the Spouter's Inn constructed as a set in Cox's Warehouse. The series stars William Hurt as Ahab, Gillian Anderson as his wife Elizabeth, Ethan Hawke as Starbuck and Donald Sutherland as Father Mappel.

In 2014 filming for The Book of Negroes occurred on historic Dock Street, with Shelburne being featured as itself. Parts of the 2019 documentary There's Something in the Water were filmed in Shelburne.

== Public library ==
Located at 17 Glasgow Street in Shelburne, the McKay Memorial Library is one of the larger branches of the Western Counties Regional Library. It joined the Western Counties Regional Library on June 5, 1969, but it did not have a physical location in Shelburne until the first branch opened on February 15, 1970. The branch relocated to its present site on July 21, 1989.

== Parks ==
- The Islands Provincial Park is located nearby in the Municipality of the District of Shelburne.

== Notable people ==
- Jody Holden, beach volleyball player
- Gideon White, politician and captain in the Duke of Cumberland's Regiment

== See also ==
- List of municipalities in Nova Scotia
- Reids Hill
