= Pentz =

Pentz may refer to:

- Pentz, Nova Scotia, a rural community in Nova Scotia, Canada
- Pentz (surname), people with the surname

== See also ==
- Pentzia, a genus of African plants in the chamomile tribe of the sunflower family
