= James Fullarton =

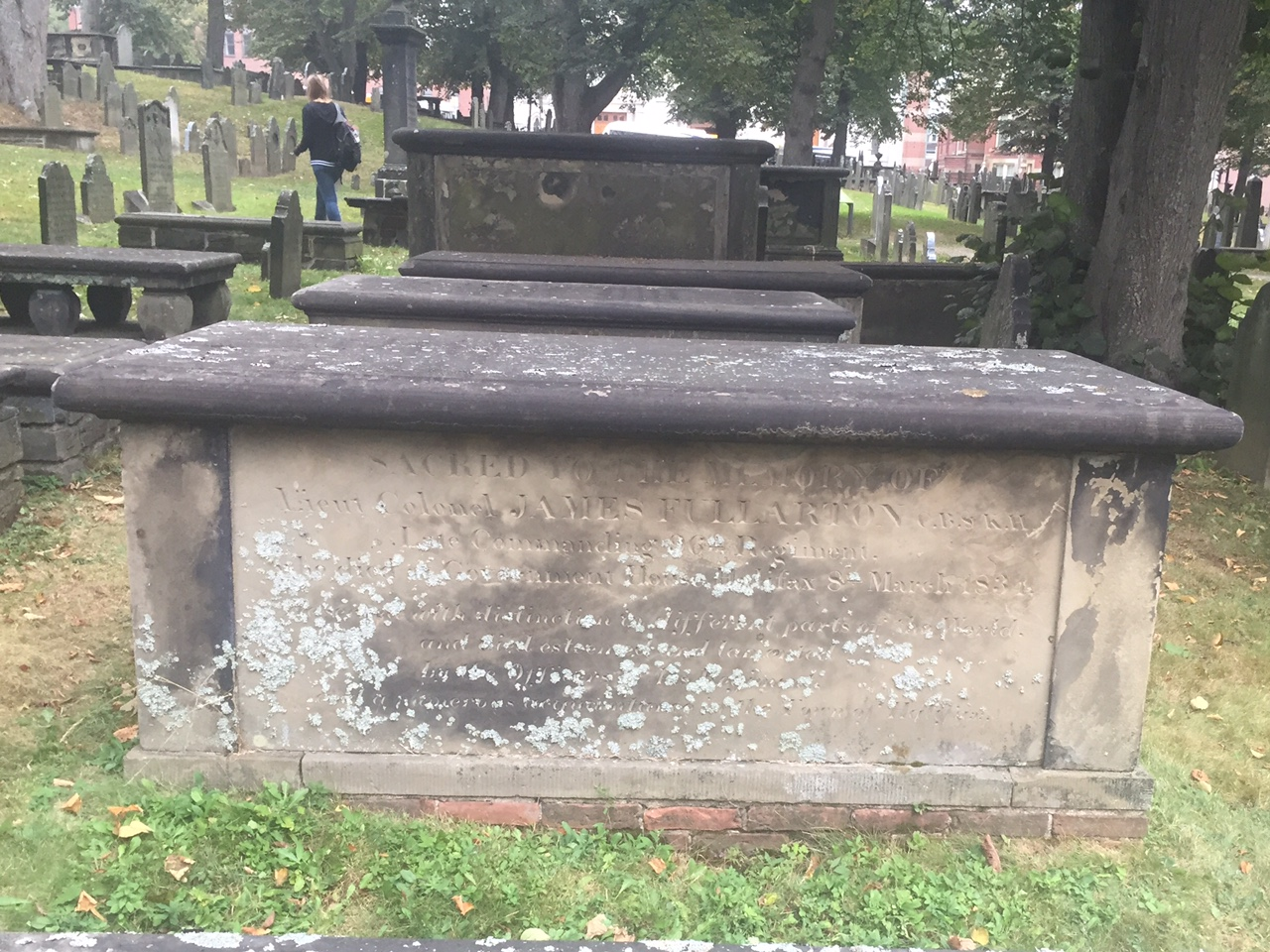
- Tomb of Fullarton at Old Burying Ground (Halifax, Nova Scotia)
- Born: 17 December 1782; Isle of Arran, Scotland
- Died: 8 March 1834 (aged 51); Halifax, Nova Scotia, Canada
- Military career
- Allegiance: United Kingdom / British Empire
- Branch: British Army
- Service years: 1803–1834
- Rank: Lieutenant-Colonel
- Conflicts: Kandyan Wars Peninsular War: Battle of Corunna; Battle of Barrosa; Battle of Salamanca; War of the Sixth Coalition: Siege of Antwerp (1814); Hundred Days: Battle of Waterloo
- Awards: Order of the Bath; Royal Guelphic Order

Lieutenant-Colonel James Fullarton, C.B., K. H. (17 December 1782 – 8 March 1834) was a soldier who fought in the Kandyan Wars (1803–1807). During the Peninsular War he fought in the Battle of Corunna (1809) and the Battle of Barrosa (1811). He then went to Holland and in the War of the Sixth Coalition he was sent to attack Merksem and then bombard Antwerp. During the Hundred Days, he was wounded in the Battle of Waterloo (1815), where he was second in command of the 3rd Battalion, 95th Regiment of Foot. He lived the last seven years of his life in Halifax, Nova Scotia.

== Career ==
Fullarton started his military career as an ensign in the 51st Regiment of Foot on 24 December 1802. He was then promoted to lieutenant in July 1803 and deployed to Kandyan Wars in Ceylon (1803–1807), where he was wounded.

He served in the Peninsular War from October 1808 to January 1809 and from August 1811 to January 1812. In 1808, under Sir John Moore, Fullarton served in the operations in Spain at Galicia and fought in the Battle of Corunna. On 7 May 1809, he became a captain in the 3rd Battalion of the 95th Regiment, under Major John Ross. In July 1811, Fullarton was posted to Cádiz and fought in the Battle of Barrosa. Then he was sent to Portugal and fought in the Battle of Salamanca, under the command of Arthur Wellesley, 1st Duke of Wellington.

He served in Holland from 1813 to 1814 during the War of the Sixth Coalition. He was sent to attack Merksem and then bombard Antwerp on 6 February 1814. According to Sir William Henry Cope, on 13 January 1814

There was a smart skirmish; and the enemy were driven into Antwerp. The Riflemen distinguished themselves in this affair; and Sir Thomas Graham in his despatch particularly mentions 'the rapid but orderly advance of the detachment of the 3rd Battalion of the Rifle Corps under Captain Fullarton's command,' with great praise.

Years after the Netherlands campaigns, Brigadier-General Sir Charles Shaw wrote about being rescued by Fullarton, even though Fullarton himself had been wounded:

Unable to move on, I remained behind the column, expecting to be taken prisoner; but an officer of the Rifles, who was well mounted, perceiving my situation, rode up to me, and although he could himself walk with difficulty, dismounted, and, tying his horse to a tree, bade me mount him when I found himself a little better. I had never seen this officer before; I had no kind of acquaintance with him, nor he with me; and it may be imagined by those who have been in similar situations how I appreciated such conduct. I should do but half my duty did I not record the name of this good and generous man. It was Colonel James Fullerton, of the Rifles, who died about two years ago, in command of the 96th Regiment. A better man or a braver solder never served king or country. Something may be gained by adulation of the living, but what avails it to flatter the 'dull cold ear of Death.' Colonel Fullerton is beyond the reach of my praise, and the expression of my gratitude is no values to him; but, in holding up such a character for example, I only perform by duty to the living.

Fullarton then went to fight in the Battle of Waterloo on 18 June 1815, where he served under Sir Frederick Adam's brigade and was "severely" wounded after he had taken command of his regiment after replacing Major (Brevet Lieutenant-Colonel) John Ross, who had also been wounded. As a result of his actions at Waterloo, he was made a Companion of the Bath and a Knight of Hanover.

In August 1821 he was posted to Paris and promoted to major. The Duke of Wellington became Colonel-in-Chief of the regiment in 1820. In October 1826, he became lieutenant-colonel of the 96th Regiment.

In September 1827 Fullarton was appointed to the 96th Regiment of Foot, stationed at Halifax, Nova Scotia, where he remained for the next seven years. While in Halifax he was appointed a Knight of Hanover.

He died at Government House in Halifax, Nova Scotia on 8 March 1834 and is buried in the Old Burying Ground.

Fullarton's Waterloo Medal sold for 6500 pounds in 2002.

== Family ==
Son of Lewis Fullarton, of Kilmichael, Isle of Arran. C.B. and bt. Lt.-col for Waterloo. He married on 7 August 1817, Jane, daughter of Colin McCleverty, M.D., of Chestervale, Jamaica. Lt. Col. 96th Regt. 1827. K.H. Died at Halifax, Nova Scotia 8 March 1834.
