= Luxton Lake (Nova Scotia) =

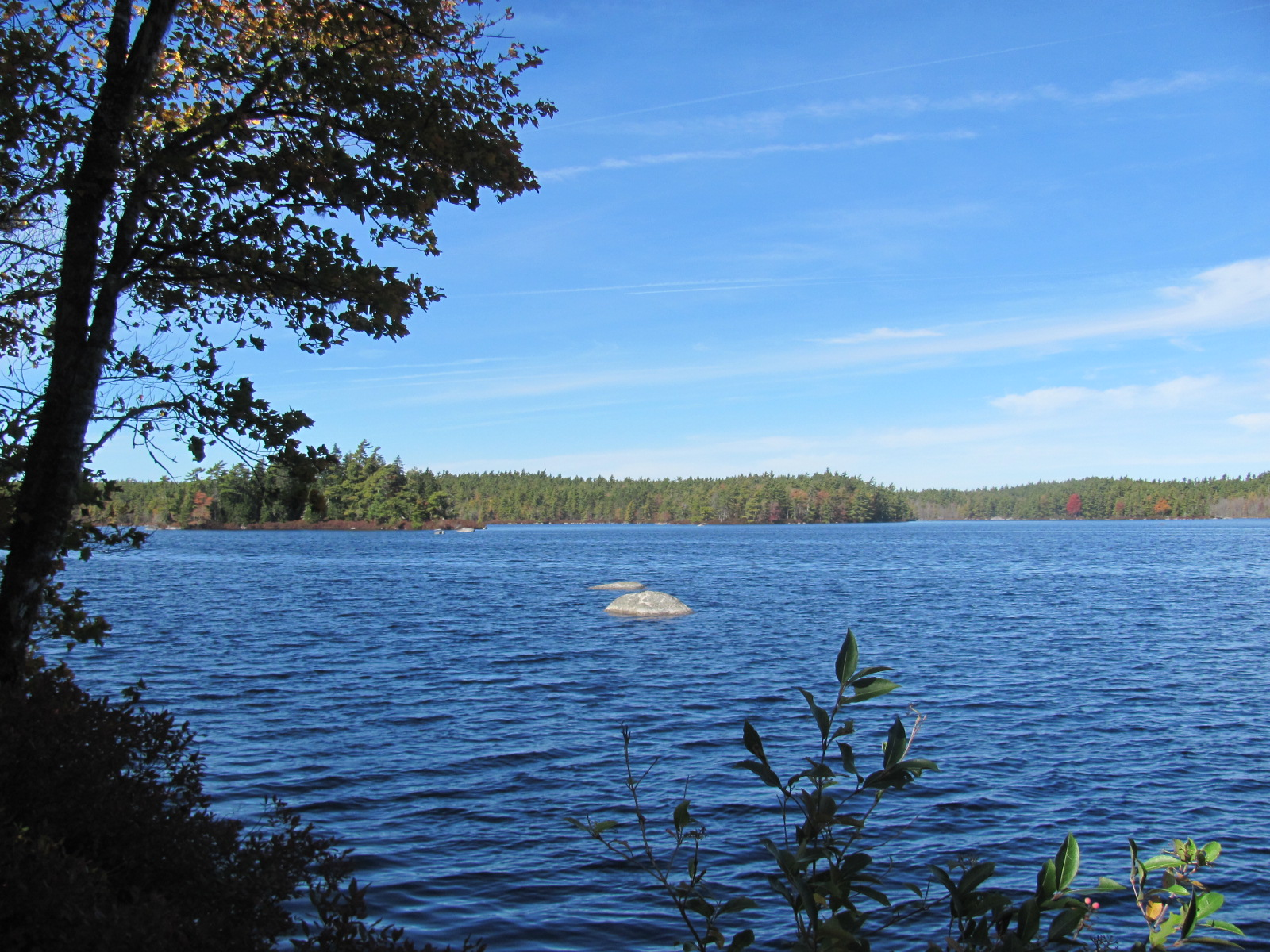

- Location within Nova Scotia
- Location: Annapolis County, Nova Scotia
- Coordinates: 44.363°N 65.344°W
- Type: Lake
- Primary outflows: Luxton Brook
- Basin countries: Canada
- Max. length: 1 km (0.62 mi)
- Max. width: 1 km (0.62 mi)

Luxton Lake is a lake in Annapolis County, Nova Scotia, Canada, within Kejimkujik National Park and is the site of an abandoned sawmill and former hiking trail.

== Geography ==
The lake is drained by Luxton Brook which flows northeast from the lake into the West River. Luxton Lake contains two small islands. The lake is inside Kejimkujik National Park's Designated Wilderness Area, the most protected habitat of the park.

== History ==
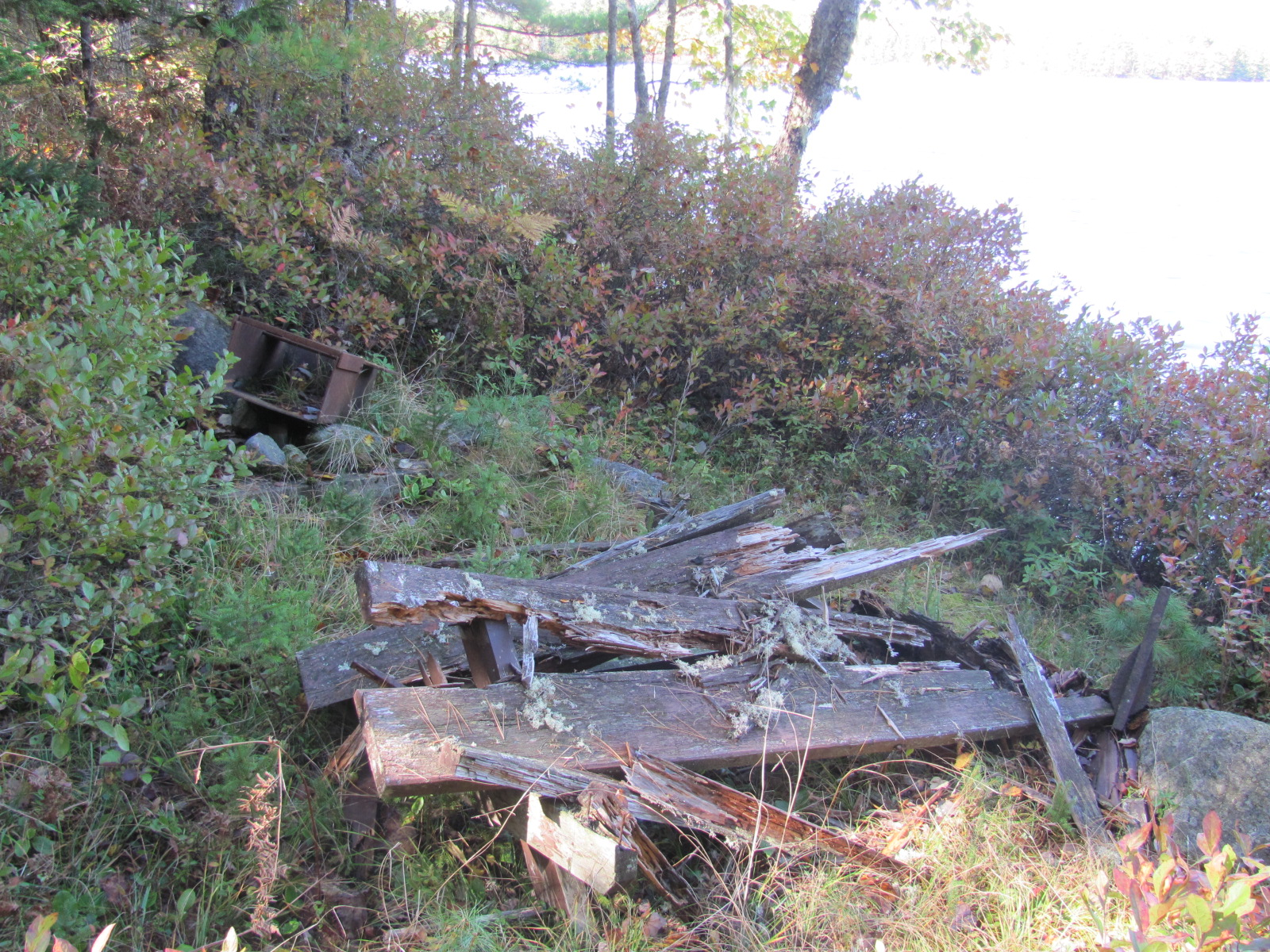
The abandoned campsite at Luxton Lake

The lake is named after the Luxton family who operated a sawmill on the south shore of the lake until Kejimkujik National Park was created in 1969. The Luxtons moved their mill to Northfield, Queens County at Mill Lake, which also became known locally for a time as Luxton Lake. Sawdust piles and slowly decaying ruins remain in the Park at the old mill site on Luxton Lake.

== Former Hiking Trail ==
Luxton Lake used to be accessible via the 4 kilometre Luxton Lake trail which followed the old saw mill road from Poison Ivy Falls passing Ben Lake. The trail included a back country campsite (No. 39) on Luxton Lake beside the ruins of the sawmill. However, the trail was closed after 2010.
