= Northfield, Queens, Nova Scotia =

Community in Nova Scotia, Canada

Coordinates: 44°27′22.79″N 65°7′53.72″W

Northfield in Nova Scotia

Northfield is a community in the Canadian province of Nova Scotia, located in the Region of Queens Municipality.

Northfield was the birthplace in 1883 of noted shipbuilder James Havelock Harding.

Northfield was also home to the Luxton family who operated a sawmill on Luxton Lake in Kejimkujik National Park until the mill was forced to move to Mill Lake near Northfield in 1969 when the Park was created.
