= James Havelock Harding =

Canadian master shipwright

James Havelock Harding, was a master shipwright and shipbuilder who worked at Shelburne, Nova Scotia. He was born in Queens County, Nova Scotia, Canada in 1883.

== Family origins ==
Four Harding Brothers arrived in Shelburne as United Empire Loyalist. Three of the brothers had kids. One of these, Jasper Hard, was James Harding's great grandfather. Jasper Harding was born in 1748 in Ireland. He married Elizabeth Hanson from Delaware in 1786. They had several children. Their third son Richard married Isabella MacDonald in 1822. They had a son Cornelius who married Mary Ann Decker.

== Early life ==
Harding was born in Northfield, Queens County, Nova Scotia. His father, Cornelius Harding married Mary Ann Decker. Together they had four children; Hedley Vickers (1865), Isabel (1876), Elizabeth Ann (1880) and James Havelock (1883) Harding. At a young age he moved to Shelburne and in 1900, he joined the workforce at McGill Shipyard. This career choice led to him becoming one of the most respected master shipwrights and builders in the Shelburne area.

== Career ==
At the time, the McGill Shipyard was one of the leading wooden shipbuilding establishments in Atlantic Canada. It was under the direction of Amos Pentz, a master shipwright and fellow Queens County folk man, which James Harding would learn the intricacies and perfection of the trade. He helped his mentor and assisted him in supervising vessels which were under construction.

Some notable ships worked on by Mr. Harding were the first steam powered fishing vessels built in Nova Scotia, the Harbinger (1901) and Messenger (1902). He also played a role in the construction of the Arbutus (1903) as was present when the keels were laid for the Albert J Lutz (1908) and Dorothy M Smart (1910). These two ships were known for their speed and competed in the Brittian Cup in the Nova Scotia Fishermen's Regatta held in Digby, Nova Scotia in 1911.

In 1916, Mr. Harding left the McGill yard to pursue his own career and became the master shipwright for the Shelburne Shipbuilders Ltd. The first ship launched by the company was a freight steamer and passenger vessel known as the Keith Cann (1917). During his time with the company, he supervised the construction of 60 vessels of different types (two-masted fishing schooners, three masted tern schooners, yachts, ferries, motorized rum runners, naval mine sweepers and diesel powered fishing vessels).

During the 1920s, he supervised the production and construction several well crafted yachts, which ended up winning several races. The Waterwitch, won the Miami to Nassau Race, the Malay was a two time winner of the Newport-to-Bermuda race, and the Little Haligonian who won the St. Petersburg-to-Havana race three times.

He displayed great care and dedication to all ships built under his tutelage. This was no exception for the Haligonian (1925) which was a two masted schooner to race against the Bluenose. The Haligonian was able to beat the Bluenose during an informal race; however it was never able to do so during elimination races.

His rum running ships earned a notorious name for the trade during their careers. These ships were the Josiphine K (1926), Alpaca (1927), James B (1928), Symor (1928), Isabel H (1928), Malbo (1929), Maskinoque (1930) and the Florann (1931).

During World War II, he was responsible for the construction of five minesweepers. His plans for the ships were used all across Nova Scotia.

He retired after he saw the construction of two fishery research vessels, the Harengus (1946) and Cadagan (1947).

== Death ==
James Harding died on Monday July 10, 1978 in his home at Shelburne. He left behind his wife, Jennie Arnold McKay and his son James Mackay Harding. He was buried in the Pine Grove Cemetery.
