= Isaac Hildreth =

English architect (1741–1807)

- Born: Isaac Hildreth; 1741; Ellerton-on-Swale, Yorkshire, England, Kingdom of Great Britain
- Died: 16 September 1807 (aged 65–66); Shelburne, Nova Scotia, Canada
- Occupation: Architect
- Buildings: Government House (Nova Scotia); Christ Church, Shelburne
- Projects: Halifax Town Clock

Isaac Hildreth (1741 – 16 September 1807) was an 18th century British architect, surveyor, and master builder.

== Early life ==
Isaac Hildreth was born in 1741 in Ellerton-on-Swale, Yorkshire, England, Kingdom of Great Britain. He moved to Norfolk, in the Colony of Virginia, in 1770.

== Career ==
Hildreth, who held various jobs in Virginia, surveyed the James River falls and, in 1774, proposed canals for the North and Elizabeth Rivers. Backing Governor Dunmore at the Revolutionary War's outset, he contributed to building military defenses but lost everything in the Burning of Norfolk. He resigned in 1776 and returned to England. In the early 1780s, the Hildreths returned to the Colonies, residing in Charleston, South Carolina, before relocating amid the British evacuation in December 1782. After time in Jamaica, Hildreth arrived with other Loyalists at Shelburne in the Colony of Nova Scotia in 1783. He received a 360-acre land grant in the county and established a carpentry firm. Hildreth, a builder by trade, quickly secured work and was commissioned in 1788 to construct Christ Church, Shelburne.

In addition to building King's Collegiate School (now King's-Edgehill School) in Windsor, adapted from Peter Harrison's plans, he worked on sections of the Shubenacadie Canal, which spans Halifax to the Bay of Fundy. In 1797, Hildreth was tasked with the first survey and report when a committee was appointed to explore the possibility of a canal connecting Dartmouth Cove to Minas Basin by way of the Shubenacadie lakes. A report from the feasibility study, completed with the help of Theophilus Chamberlain, a surveyor from the Preston area, was published on 15 November 1797, estimating a 4-foot navigation would cost £3,202 and 17 shillings. The total expense for the survey and report was £208 and 13 shillings.

Eventually settling in Halifax by 1800, Hildreth built the Government House, the official residence of the Lieutenant Governor of Nova Scotia. On 11 September 1800, the first stone was laid by Nova Scotia Governor Sir John Wentworth. The masonry for the building was led by chief mason John Henderson. The original design is thought to originate from Peter Harrison, following John Wentworth's request for plans for a governor's mansion in Portsmouth, Virginia.

In 1802–03, the Halifax Town Clock, a clock tower ordered by Prince Edward, was built under the supervision of Hildreth following a design by architect Captain William Fenwick of the Royal Engineers.

Following the completion of the Government House, Hildreth was recognized for his contributions to the building project through a formal certificate issued by the Committee of Assembly in January 1807.

== Death ==
Isaac Hildreth died on 16 September 1807 in Shelburne, Nova Scotia, Canada.
