= Government House (Nova Scotia) =

Official residence of the Lieutenant Governor of Nova Scotia

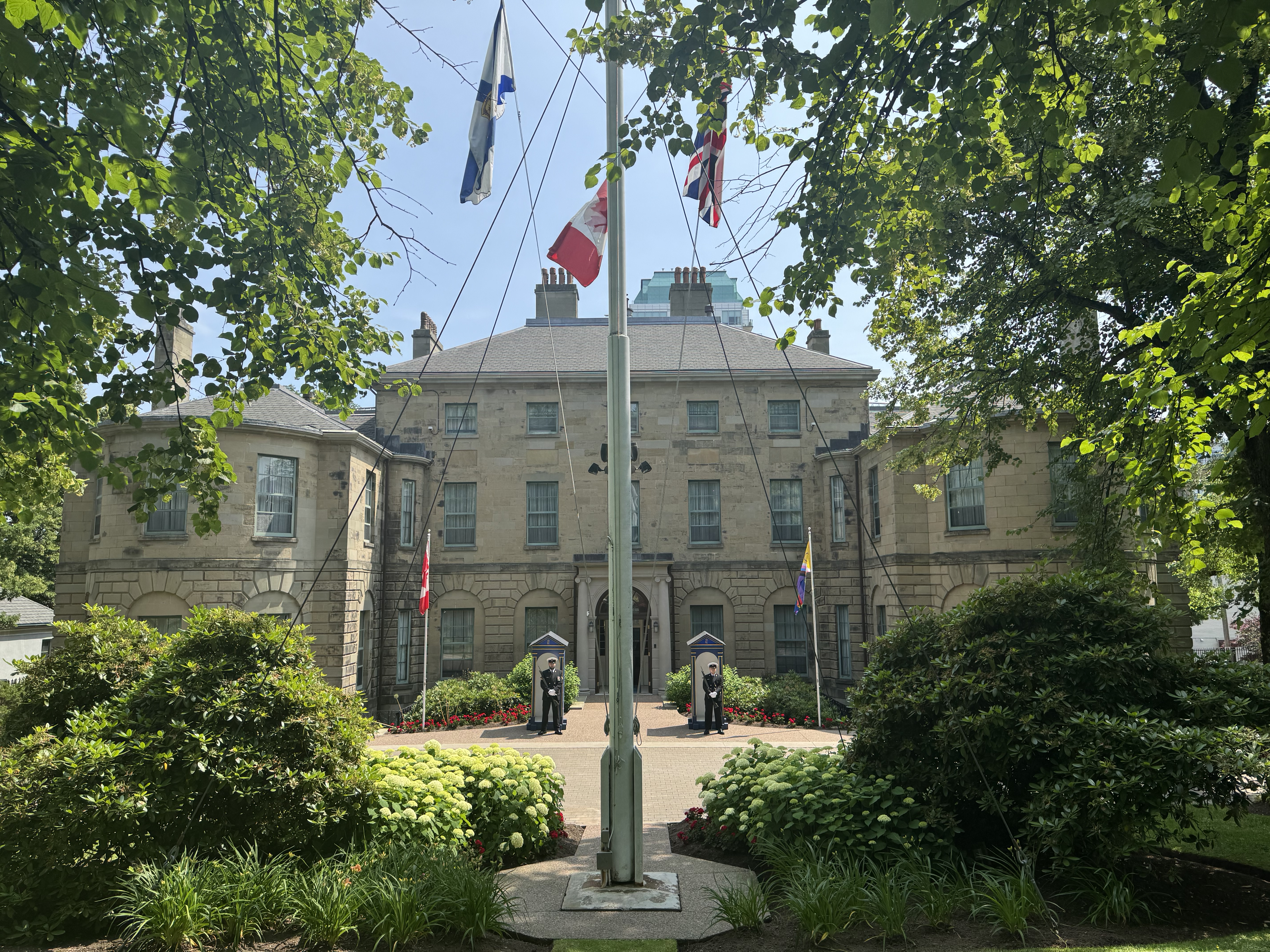
- Main façade of Government House

General information
- Architectural style: Adamesque Georgian
- Location: 1451 Barrington Street; Halifax, Nova Scotia, Canada
- Coordinates: 44.643414°N 63.571293°W
- Construction started: 1800
- Client: The King of the United Kingdom (George III)
- Owner: The King in Right of Nova Scotia (Charles III)

Technical details
- Structural system: Timber framing and load-bearing masonry

Design and construction
- Architect: Isaac Hildreth

National Historic Site of Canada
- Official name: Government House National Historic Site of Canada
- Designated: 1982

Nova Scotia Heritage Property Act
- Type: Provincially Registered Property
- Designated: 1983
- Reference no.: 00PNS0007

Government House of Nova Scotia is the official residence of the lieutenant governor of Nova Scotia, and is located in Halifax. It stands in the provincial capital at 1451 Barrington Street; unlike other provincial Government Houses in Canada, this gives Nova Scotia's vice-regal residence a prominent urban setting, though it is still surrounded by gardens.

== History ==
Construction of Government House was ordered in 1800 by then governor Sir John Wentworth to replace the existing Government House that stood on the present location of Province House, with the cornerstone being laid on 1 September of that year. The site had originally been purchased by the Crown as the location for a new colonial legislature, but it was eventually deemed to be too far removed from the capital, and was allocated for use as a viceregal residence instead. The Governor and his family moved into the still incomplete building in 1805.

Painting of Government House in 1819

On 8 March 1834, Lieut. Col. James Fullarton, C.B., K. H. died at Government House and was later buried at the Old Burying Ground (Halifax, Nova Scotia).

The first royal resident was Prince Edward, Prince of Wales (later King Edward VII), in 1860, who was followed by others such as Prince Arthur, Duke of Connaught and Strathearn, in 1869 (he would also serve as Governor General of Canada); Prince George (later King George V) in 1883 and 1901; Prince Albert in 1913 and again in 1939 as King George VI, along with his wife, Queen Elizabeth, who returned as the Queen Mother in 1967 for the Canadian Centennial and in 1979; their daughters, Princess Elizabeth, Duchess of Edinburgh, in 1951 and again in 1959, 1976, 1994 and 2010 as Queen Elizabeth II, and Princess Margaret, Countess of Snowdon, in 1958 and 1988; Elizabeth II's children, Prince Andrew in 1985 and Prince Edward in 1987, as well as Charles, Prince of Wales, in 1983, accompanied by Diana, Princess of Wales. The mansion was also the gathering place for the various ministers of finance attending the 1995 G7 summit in Halifax.

A fire erupted in the mansion's attic in 1854; however, the blaze was kept under control due to the fireproofing precautions taken during the design and construction of the edifice. Government House was not well maintained in the latter half of the 20th century. As one of the oldest official residences in Canada, Government House was designated a National Historic Site of Canada in 1982. The following year, the provincial government, under the Heritage Property Act, listed the house and its gardens as a Provincially Registered Property, in recognition of its Georgian architecture and its association with the various lieutenant governors since 1805 and the Canadian monarchy. The property was not well maintained, regardless, and it underwent extensive renovation and restoration for three years prior to the end of 2008; the building was rededicated by Queen Elizabeth II on 28 June 2010. At the same time, a new Royal Key was inaugurated; it was presented to the Queen and then returned at the end of her tour of Canada, so as to be granted to future lieutenant governors. Nova Scotia's Government House is presently the oldest viceregal residence in North America.

== Use ==
Government House is owned by the King in Right of Nova Scotia and is open to the public at certain times. It is also where visiting dignitaries are greeted and often stay while in Halifax, as well as the location of numerous vice-regal events, such as the bestowing of provincial awards or inductions into the Order of Nova Scotia, luncheons, dinners, receptions, and speaking engagements. It is at Government House that the lieutenant governor drops the writs of election, swears-in new members of the Executive Council, and holds audiences with the premier. In 2016 the Lieutenant Governor of Nova Scotia John James Grant hosted the annual conference of the Governor General, Lieutenant Governors and Territorial Commissioners at Government House.

== Architecture and art ==
Government House's overall style is one of Georgian with hints of Adam, elements of the main and rear facades having been taken from a book of house plans published in 1795 by George Richardson, a former employee of Robert and James Adam. Many of the materials, however, were acquired locally; the stone came from Antigonish, Bedford Basin, Cape Breton, Lockeport, Lunenburg, and Pictou, brick from Dartmouth, and pine from the Annapolis Valley, Cornwallis, and Tatamagouche. Imported materials came from New Brunswick, Newfoundland, England, and Scotland; notably, the marble fireplace mantles were made in London. These adorned an interior arranged for both entertaining and state business, including a drawing room, dining room, and ballroom for formal entertaining, as well a suite for the governor, his family, and servants. At the time, Nova Scotia had no equal in design and decoration. Hung throughout the building are a number of portraits by Robert Field.

== See also ==
- Government Houses in Canada
- Government Houses of the British Empire and Commonwealth
- List of historic places in Halifax, Nova Scotia
- List of oldest buildings and structures in Halifax, Nova Scotia
