= Pentz (surname) =

Pentz is a surname. Notable people with the surname include:

- Amos Pentz (1849-1922), Canadian shipbuilder
- Gene Pentz (born 1953), American baseball player
- Ivan Pentz (born 1957), South African rower
- Manfred Pentz (born 1980), German politician
- Mike Pentz (1924-1995), South African physicist
- Patrick Pentz (born 1997), Austrian goalkeeper
- Thomas Pentz (born 1978), American DJ and music producer
