= Reids Hill, Nova Scotia =

Community in Nova Scotia, Canada

Coordinates: 43.7658°N 65.3479°W

Reids Hill is a community in Shelburne County, Nova Scotia, Canada.
