= National Strategy to Redress Environmental Racism Act =

Canadian law

Parliament of Canada
- Long title: An Act respecting the development of a national strategy to redress environmental racism (Bill C-230, 2020)
- Territorial extent: Canada
- Enacted by: Parliament of Canada

Legislative history
- Bill title: C-230
- Introduced by: Lenore Zann
- Second reading: March 24, 2021

The National Strategy to Redress Environmental Racism Act (French: Loi sur la stratégie nationale relative au racisme environnemental et à la justice environnementale, Bill C-230, 2020) is a law passed by the Parliament of Canada as a private member's bill proposed by Cumberland—Colchester MP Lenore Zann.

== Summary ==
The bill would require the federal Minister of the Environment, the Honourable Julie Dabrusin to create a national strategy to tackle environmental racism within two years. It includes provisions for the government to collect statistical information on the links between race, socioeconomic status, health outcomes, and environmental hazards.

== Legislative history ==
Zann had previously proposed a similar bill, Bill 32, to the Nova Scotia House of Assembly in October 2017 when she served as an MLA. She had worked with Dalhousie University professor Ingrid Waldron on writing the bill, which ultimately did not pass. Its core text was later successfully added as an amendment to the 2021 Act.

Elected as a federal MP with the Liberal Party of Canada in 2019, Zann introduced a federal version of the act as a private member's bill to the House of Commons in February 2020. The bill was seconded by Green Party leader Elizabeth May. After the federal parliament was prorogued from August to September 2020, the bill was reinstated to the new session of parliament. On the 24th of March 2021, the bill passed its second reading in the House of Commons by a vote of 182 to 153, being referred to the Standing Committee on Environment and Sustainable Development before third reading.
