= There's Something in the Water =

2019 Canadian documentary film

- Film poster
- Directed by: Elliot Page (Note: Credited as Ellen Page; Page came out as transgender and changed his name in 2020.); Ian Daniel
- Based on: There's Something in the Water: Environmental Racism in Indigenous and Black Communities by Ingrid Waldron
- Produced by: Elliot Page; Ian Daniel; Julia Sanderson; Ingrid Waldron
- Cinematography: Ian Daniel; Elliot Page
- Edited by: Xavier Coleman; Hugo Perez
- Production company: 2 Weeks Notice
- Release date: September 8, 2019 (TIFF)
- Running time: 73 minutes
- Country: Canada
- Language: English

There's Something in the Water is a 2019 Canadian documentary film, directed by Elliot Page and Ian Daniel. An examination of environmental racism, the film explores the disproportionate effect of environmental damage on Black Canadian and First Nations communities in Nova Scotia. The film takes its name from Ingrid Waldron's book on environmental racism, There's Something in the Water.

== Synopsis ==
The film begins by depicting conditions in the black community outside of Shelburne, Nova Scotia, where a correlation between contaminated well water and elevated rates of cancer went unaddressed. The film also explores Indigenous communities in Nova Scotia such as Pictou Landing First Nation which was affected by water pollution in Boat Harbour and lastly Sipekneꞌkatik First Nation and their fight against the Alton Gas company's plan to release salt brine into the Shubenacadie River.

== Production ==
The film was co-directed and produced by Elliot Page and Ian Daniel, who had previously worked together on the documentary series Gaycation. Starting in April 2019, it was shot on location in Nova Scotia and includes interviews with various environmental activists from marginalized communities, along with archival news footage. Page made the film with $350,000 of his own money.

== Release ==
The film premiered at the 2019 Toronto International Film Festival and was released on Netflix on March 27, 2020.

== Reception ==
On the review aggregator Rotten Tomatoes, 79% of 14 critic reviews are positive, and the average rating is 7.3/10. According to Metacritic, which sampled six critics and calculated a weighted average score of 62 out of 100, the film received "generally favorable reviews".

Jordan Mintzer of The Hollywood Reporter gave a mostly positive review, concluding that "Made in a standard documentary format that includes a voiceover and a tad too much weepy music, Water gets its job done directly enough, underlining a situation that remains dire despite what seems to be a growing level awareness around the country."

Partially as a result of the awareness the film raised, Canada’s House of Commons passed a bill in March 2023 to address environmental racism. The bill received royal assent in June 2024.
