= Amos Pentz =

Canadian shipbuilder (1849–1922)

Amos Parker Pentz (December 11, 1849 – December 11, 1922) was a Canadian shipbuilder from Shelburne, Nova Scotia. He was noted for his fast and innovative designs of fishing schooners and trawlers.

He was born in Beach Meadow, Queens County, Nova Scotia, to Martin Pentz and Eliza Jane Maxwell. From a young age, Pentz had always taken a strong interest in ships. As he became older, his passion for ships turned into his livelihood. The combination of his talent for woodwork, and knowledge of ships, created a foundation for a lifetime of success in his field of work. He began his career in 1872 as an itinerant ship builder. He slowed his career down briefly around 1891 when he married Annie Matthews (on October 24, 1891). Pentz and his family eventually moved on to Shelburne to continue his work with shipbuilding. He was employed at the Joseph McGill Ship Yard, where he set a new example for what skills a master ship builder should have.

Over is lifetime he produced an impressive one hundred and forty-one ships. In 1901 the Harbinger was built, and in 1902 the Messenger was completed, both of these ships were steam trawlers, and were the first steam powered fishing vessels build at these docks. The Arbutus, built in 1903, was the first auxiliary powered fishing schooner built in the province of Nova Scotia. In 1908, and then 1910, the Albert J. Lutz and Dorothy M. Smart were built. These two ships were renowned for their remarkable speed and celebrated by authors such as Frederick William Wallace. Both latter vessels competed for the Britain Cup in Nova Scotia's fisherman's regatta, which was held in Digby, Nova Scotia in 1911.

Not only was he a fine ship builder, but he also was an inspiring mentor to James Havelock Harding who grew to become another one of Shelburne's best ship builders, he eventually moved to the United States to continue his career. Amos Pentz died December 11, 1922.
