= Ingrid Waldron =

Canadian social scientist

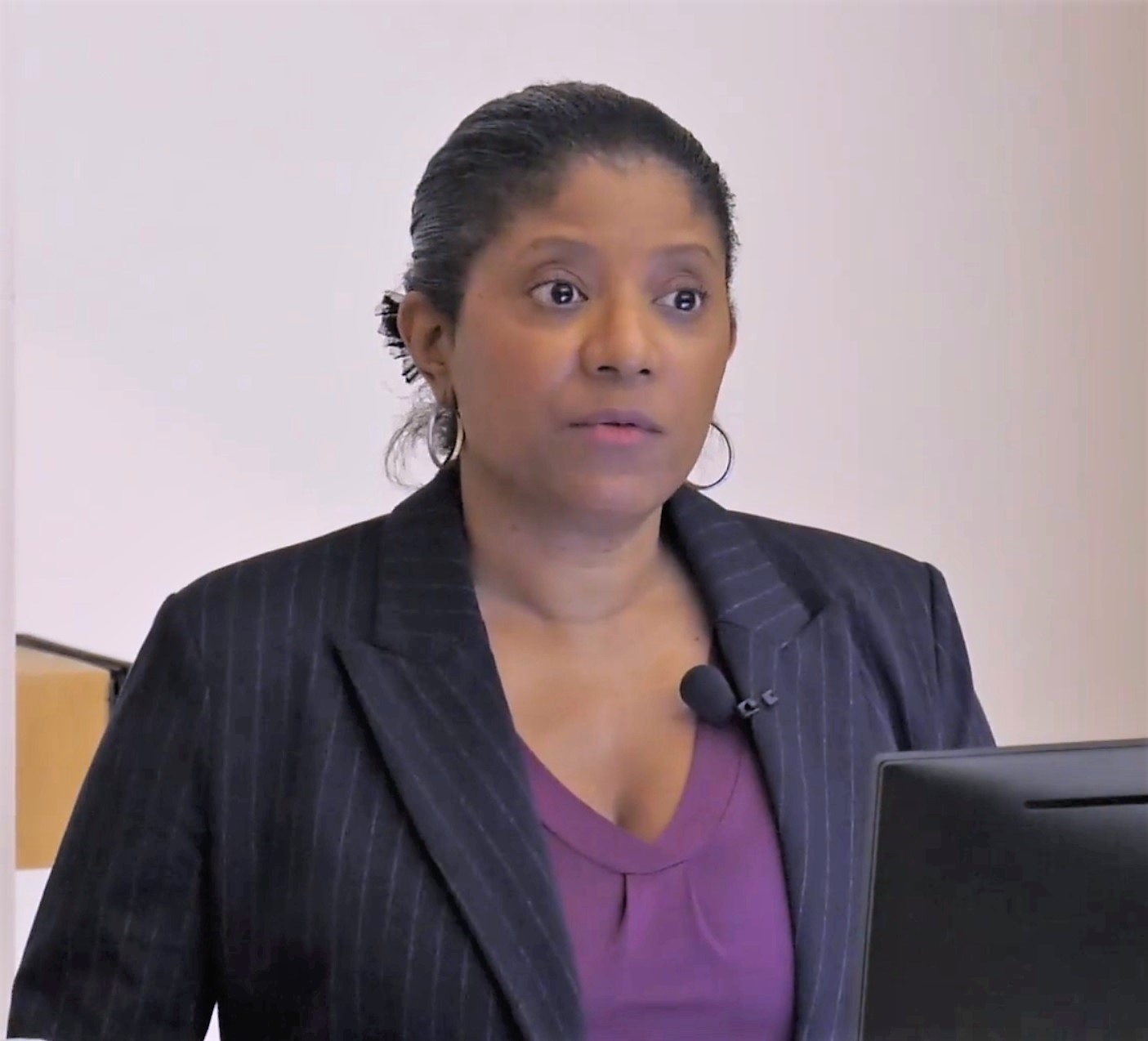
- Waldron speaks at Dalhousie University in 2018
- Education: University of Toronto (PhD); University of London (MA); McGill University (BA)
- Scientific career
- Workplaces: Dalhousie University

Ingrid R. G Waldron is a Canadian social scientist who is the HOPE (Heart, Outcomes, Prevention, Evaluation) Chair in Peace and Health in the Global Peace and Social Justice Program in the Faculty of Humanities at McMaster University. She is also the founder and Executive Director of the ENRICH project. Starting in 2012 the project explores how environmental racism and climate change disproportionally affect Indigenous and Black communities across Nova Scotia, with a focus on their social, political, environmental and health impacts. She co-produced the 2019 film There's Something in the Water with Elliot Page, Ian Daniel and Julia Sanderson, which is based on her book of the same name that was published in April of 2018.

== Early life and education ==
Waldron was born in Montreal. Her parents are from Trinidad. She studied psychology at McGill University. She moved to the United Kingdom for her graduate studies, earning a master's degree in Intercultural Education: Race, Ethnicity and Culture at the UCL Institute of Education. Waldron earned her doctoral degree in sociology and equity studies at the University of Toronto in 2002. Her PhD research examined the impact of inequality and oppression on the mental health of Black women, help-seeking, and African indigenous knowledge in mental health. In 2003 she was awarded an Ontario Women's Health Scholars Award to conduct research at the University of Toronto's Centre for Women's Health. After completing her postdoctoral research. Waldron spent several years as a lecturer at the University of Toronto and McMaster University.

== Research and career ==
In 2008 Waldron joined Dalhousie University as an assistant professor. She was promoted to associate professor in 2016 and full professor in 2019. She left the School of Nursing at Dalhousie University and service as co-chair of the Dalhousie University Black Faculty & Staff Caucus in 2021. She has studied the impact of discrimination on the physical and mental health of African Nova Scotians, Miꞌkmaq and refugee communities in Canada. Waldron is best known for her research on the health impacts of environmental racism in these communities in Halifax, Nova Scotia. Since 2012 she has directed the Environmental Noxiousness, Racial Inequities & Community Health Project (ENRICH) project. She started the project after hearing about how a landfill in Lincolnville, Nova Scotia was impacting residents' health. ENRICH uses community engagement, multi-disciplinary partnerships, training and government consultations to support local people in addressing the health effects associated with environmental racism. ENRICH addresses both aspects of environmental racism; spatial (i.e. the inequitable health risks associated with living close to environmentally hazardous activities) and procedural (i.e. the mechanisms that perpetuate these activities). ENRICH developed a research team composed of members across Nova Scotia, hosted a series of workshops entitled “In Whose Backyard? – Exploring Toxic Legacies in Mi’kmaw & African Nova Scotian Communities” and consulted with communities on existing policies.

In 2015, Waldron worked with Lenore Zann to develop a bill that addressed Canadian environmental racism. The bill, An Act to Address Environmental Racism in Nova Scotia (#111) was introduced into Canadian legislature in April 2015. A second bill, Redressing Environmental Racism, was introduced in 2018.

Waldron's 2018 book There's Something In The Water explored environmental racism in indigenous and black communities. It considers settler colonialism as the overarching theory, and explores how environmental racism is compounded by other forms of oppression. The film version was directed by Elliot Page (Note: Credited as Ellen Page) and premiered at the Toronto International Film Festival. The film had three screenings at the Atlantic International Film Festival. Variety said the film "makes a very convincing case for protections against environmental harm being applied equally to all members of society".

Waldron is Chair of the Dalhousie University Black Faculty and Staff Caucus. She is researching how women of colour in Halifax deal with mental health issues. She has identified that black women feel that white doctors and mental health practitioners do not understand how racism impacts their lived experience.

=== Awards and honours ===
- 2015 Green Campaign of the Year Award
- 2015 Advocate of the Year Award
- 2018 Dalhousie University President's Excellence Research Award – Research Impact
- 2019 Atlantic Book Award for Scholarly Writing
- Errol Sharpe Book Prize (2020)
- Clean50 Education and Thought and Leadership Award (2023)
- SustainabilityX Magazine Global 50 Women in Sustainability 2024

=== Selected publications ===
- Ingrid R. G., Waldron (2018). There's Something In The Water. Fernwood Publishing. ISBN 9781773630571.
- Waldron, Ingrid (1989). "Employment and women's health: Effects of paid employment on women's mental and physical health". American Psychologist. 44 (11): 1394–1401. doi:10.1037/0003-066X.44.11.1394.
