= List of communities in Kings County, Nova Scotia =

List of communities in Kings County, Nova Scotia.

Communities are ordered by the highway on which they are located, whose routes start after each terminus near the largest community.

== Trunk routes ==
- Trunk 1: Wolfville - Greenwich - New Minas - Kentville - Coldbrook - Cambridge - Waterville - Berwick - Aylesford - Auburn - Kingston
- Trunk 12: Kentville - South Alton- Blue Mountain

== Collector roads ==
- Route 221: Kingsport - Canning - Sheffield Mills- Centreville - Billtown - Lakeville - Buckleys Corner - Dempseys Corner - North Kingston
- Route 341: Kentville - Canard
- Route 358: Greenwich - Port Williams - Canard - Canning - The Lookoff - Scots Bay
- Route 359: Kentville - Aldershot - Centreville - Hall's Harbour
- Route 360: Morristown - Berwick - Somerset - Harbourville

== Rural roads ==
- Avonport
- Avonport Station
- Baxters Harbour
- Benjamin Bridge
- Bishopville
- Black River
- Black Rock
- Blomidon
- Burlington
- Canaan
- Canada Creek
- Cornwallis Square
- Dalhousie Road
- Factorydale
- Gaspereau
- Glenmont
- Grand Pre
- Greenfield
- Lake George
- Lakeville
- Lake Paul
- Medford
- Melanson
- Millville
- Morden
- Nicholsville
- Ogilvie
- Pereaux
- Ross Corner
- Ross Creek
- Starrs Point
- Tremont
- Vernon Mills
- Victoria Harbour
- Woodside
