= Nova Scotia Route 360 =

Highway in Nova Scotia, Canada

Route 360

Route information
- Maintained by Nova Scotia Department of Transportation and Infrastructure Renewal
- Length: 22 km (14 mi)

Major junctions
- South end: Aylesford Road in Morristown
- Trunk 1 / Hwy 101 in Berwick; Route 221 in Welsford
- North end: Long Point Road in Harbourville

Location
- Country: Canada
- Province: Nova Scotia

Highway system
- Provincial highways in Nova Scotia; 100-series
← Route 359	→ Route 362

Route 360 is a collector road in the Canadian province of Nova Scotia.

It is located in Kings County and connects Berwick at Trunk 1 with Harbourville.

It climbs the steep southern slope of the North Mountain in a sharp hairpin turn known locally as "The Oxbow".

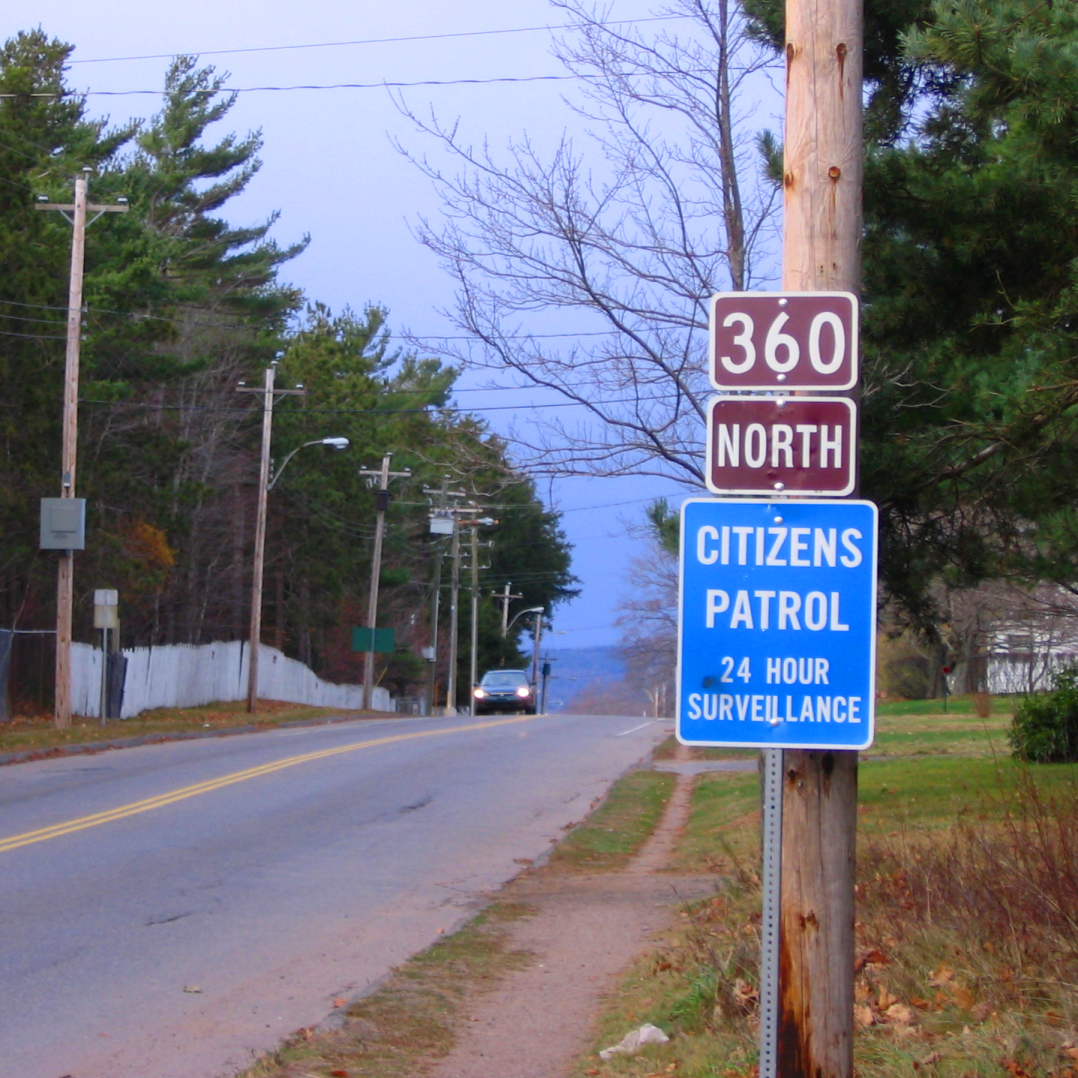
View near junction of Nova Scotia Route 360 and Trunk 1 at Berwick, Nova Scotia.

== Communities ==
- Morristown
- Berwick
- Somerset
- Welsford
- Garland
- Harbourville

== See also ==
- List of Nova Scotia provincial highways
