= Canada Creek =

Canada Creek may refer to the following places:

- Canada Creek (Michigan), United States, a stream
  - Canada Creek Ranch, Michigan, United States, an unincorporated community near the stream
- Canada Creek, Nova Scotia, Canada, a community
