= Grafton, Nova Scotia =

Community in Nova Scotia, Canada

Coordinates: 45°6′7.6″N 64°41′50″W

\Grafton in Nova Scotia

Grafton is a small farming community in the Annapolis Valley area of Kings County, Nova Scotia, Canada. Located just north of the village of Waterville, it stretches from the Cornwallis River to the slopes of the North Mountain and includes the crossroads of Buckleys Corner. Route 221 crosses the north part of Grafton while Highway 101 crosses the south part of the community. It is administratively part of the village of Cornwallis Square.

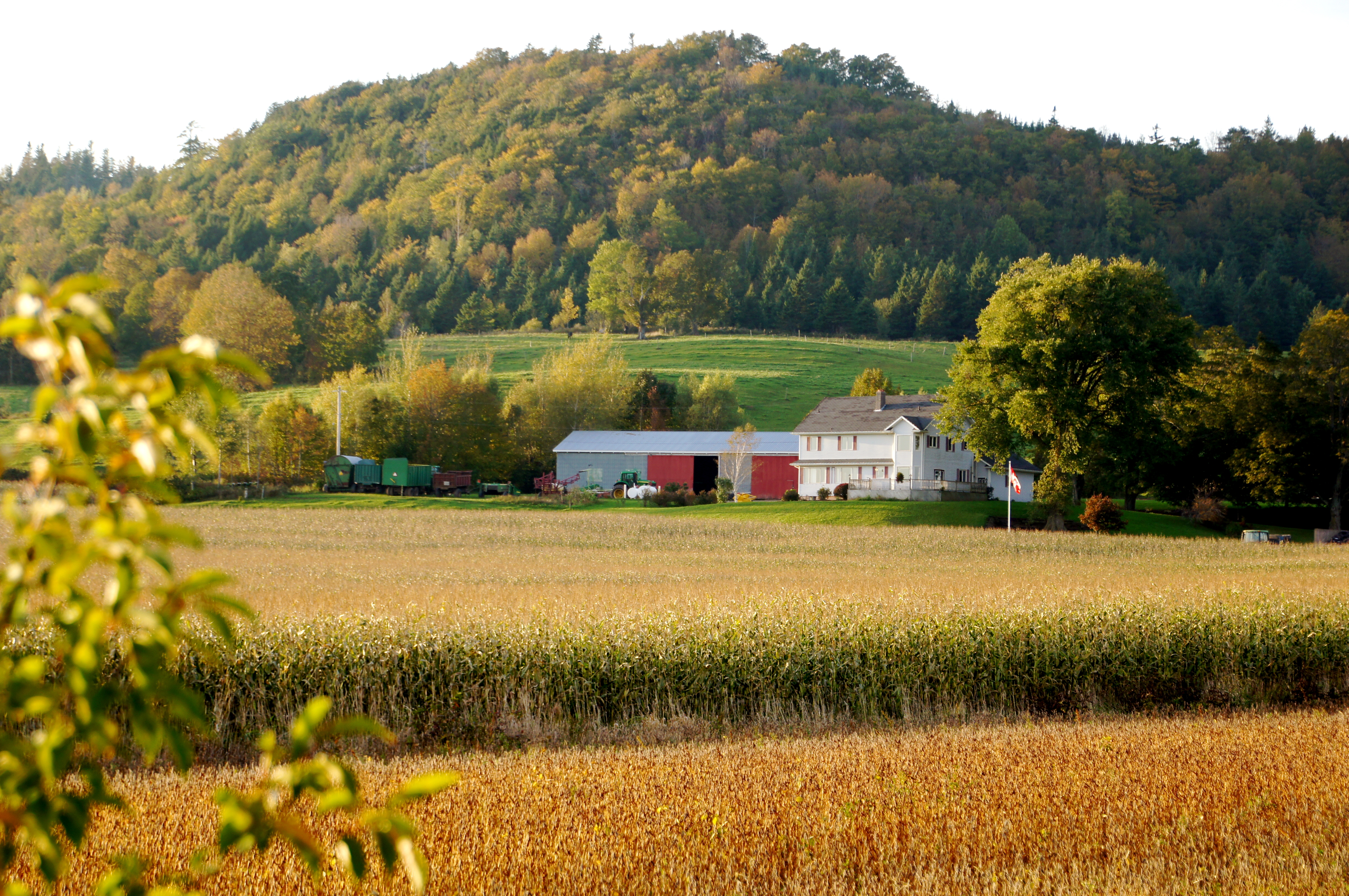
Corn growing at Grafton beside the North Mountain, October 2011

It was first settled by New England Planters in the 1820s as they moved westward from the initial settlements around Canning, Nova Scotia. One of the first homes was the Kinsman-Salsman House, built in 1818, which still survives and is now a provincial historic home. The community was named after the Duke of Grafton or Grafton, Massachusetts. An early centre of worship for various New England Planter congregations, it contains two historic graveyards and the 1842 Cornwallis Reformed Presbyterian Covenanter Church. A notable early resident was Margaret Florence Newcome who was the first woman to graduate from Dalhousie University in 1885. Grafton flourished in the late 19th and early 20th century during the peak years of the apple industry in Nova Scotia. It became a station on the North Mountain branchline of the Dominion Atlantic Railway in order to ship apples from a number of large apple warehouses. A preserved railway caboose commemorates the railway's role in the community. Grafton municipal services are administered by the village commission of Cornwallis Square along with nearby Waterville, Woodville and Cambridge.
