= Morristown, Nova Scotia =

Morristown, Nova Scotia my refer to:

- Morristown, Kings County, Nova Scotia
- Morristown, Antigonish County
