= Nicholsville =

Nicholsville may refer to one of the following places:

- Nicholsville, Alabama
- Nicholsville, Newfoundland
- Nicholsville, Nova Scotia
- Nicholsville, Ohio
