= Ross Creek =

Ross Creek may refer to:

== Australia ==
=== Queensland ===
- Ross Creek (Central Queensland), a watercourse near Yeppoon in Central Queensland
- Ross Creek (North Queensland), a watercourse that is a tributary of the Ross River, located southwest of Townsville in North Queensland
- Ross Creek (Townsville, North Queensland), a watercourse that is an anabranch of the Ross River, located near Townsville in North Queensland
- Ross Creek, Queensland, a locality in the Gympie Region

=== Victoria ===
- Ross Creek (Victoria), a rural locality on the Yarrowee River in Victoria

== Canada ==
- Ross Creek, Nova Scotia, a community in King's County

== New Zealand ==
- Ross Creek, a small tributary of the Water of Leith in Dunedin
  - Ross Creek Reservoir, Dunedin, New Zealand

== United States ==
- Ross Creek (Missouri), a stream in Missouri
