= Canada Creek (Michigan) =

Stream in Michigan, United States

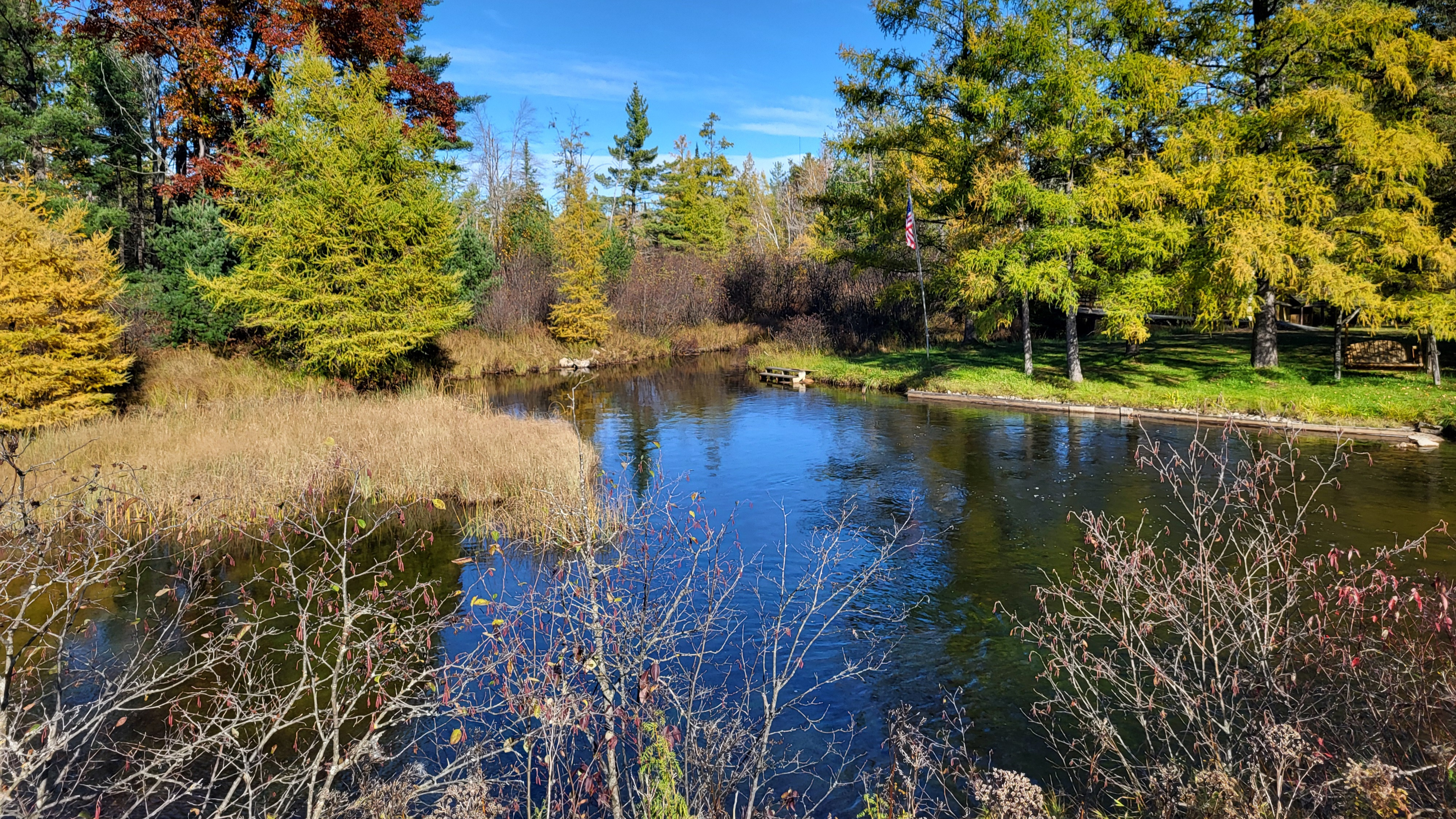
- View from CR 612 in Montmorency Township

Physical characteristics
- Source
  - location: Valentine Lake, Montmorency County, Michigan
  - coordinates: 45.06973°N 84.16973°W
- Mouth
  - location: Black River, Cheboygan County, Michigan
  - coordinates: 45.26973°N 84.25251°W
- Length: 20.3 mi (32.7 km)

Canada Creek is a 20.3-mile-long (32.7 km) stream in northeastern lower Michigan, having its origin at Valentine Lake in Briley Township in northern Montmorency County. It winds its way north through Montmorency Township then crosses into Allis Township in southwestern Presque Isle County before emptying into the Black River in Cheboygan County. Via the Black River and the Cheboygan River, Canada Creek's waters flow to Lake Huron.

Bordering on the creek in Montmorency County is the unincorporated community of Canada Creek Ranch, and two county roads, Canada Creek Hwy, and Canada Creek Rd., located in Presque Isle and Cheboygan counties respectively, are named for the creek.
