= Clear Lake State Park (Michigan) =

State park in Michigan, United States

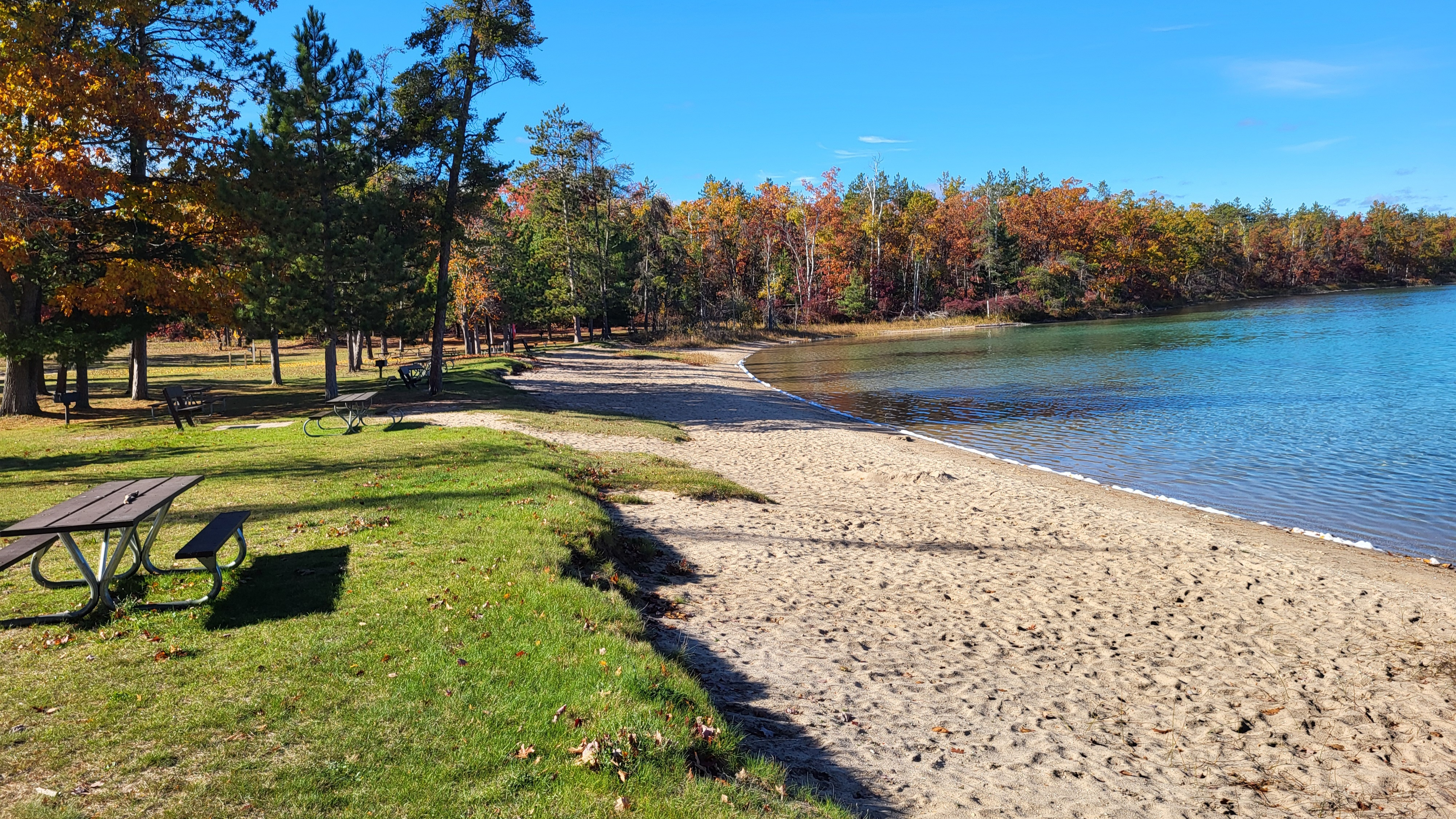
- View of the beachfront in the day-use area

- Location within Michigan Location within the United States
- Location: Canada Creek Ranch, Michigan, United States
- Nearest city: Onaway, Michigan
- Coordinates: 45°07′40″N 84°11′00″W
- Area: 290 acres (120 ha)
- Elevation: 869 feet (265 m)
- Established: 1966
- Administrator: Michigan Department of Natural Resources
- Designation: Michigan state park
- Website: Official website

Clear Lake State Park is a public recreation area covering 290 acres (120 ha) in Canada Creek Ranch, Montmorency County, Michigan. The state park occupies two-thirds of the shoreline of spring-fed, 133-acre (54 ha) Clear Lake. It is located within Mackinaw State Forest, which covers the northern eight counties of the Lower Peninsula.

== Activities and amenities ==
The state park offers swimming, fishing, boat launches, hiking, picnicking, playground, and camping.
