= Harbourville, Nova Scotia =

Community in Nova Scotia, Canada

Coordinates: 45°09′04″N 64°48′38″W

Harbourville in Nova Scotia

Harbourville is a community in the Canadian province of Nova Scotia, located in Kings County on the Minas Channel of the Bay of Fundy.

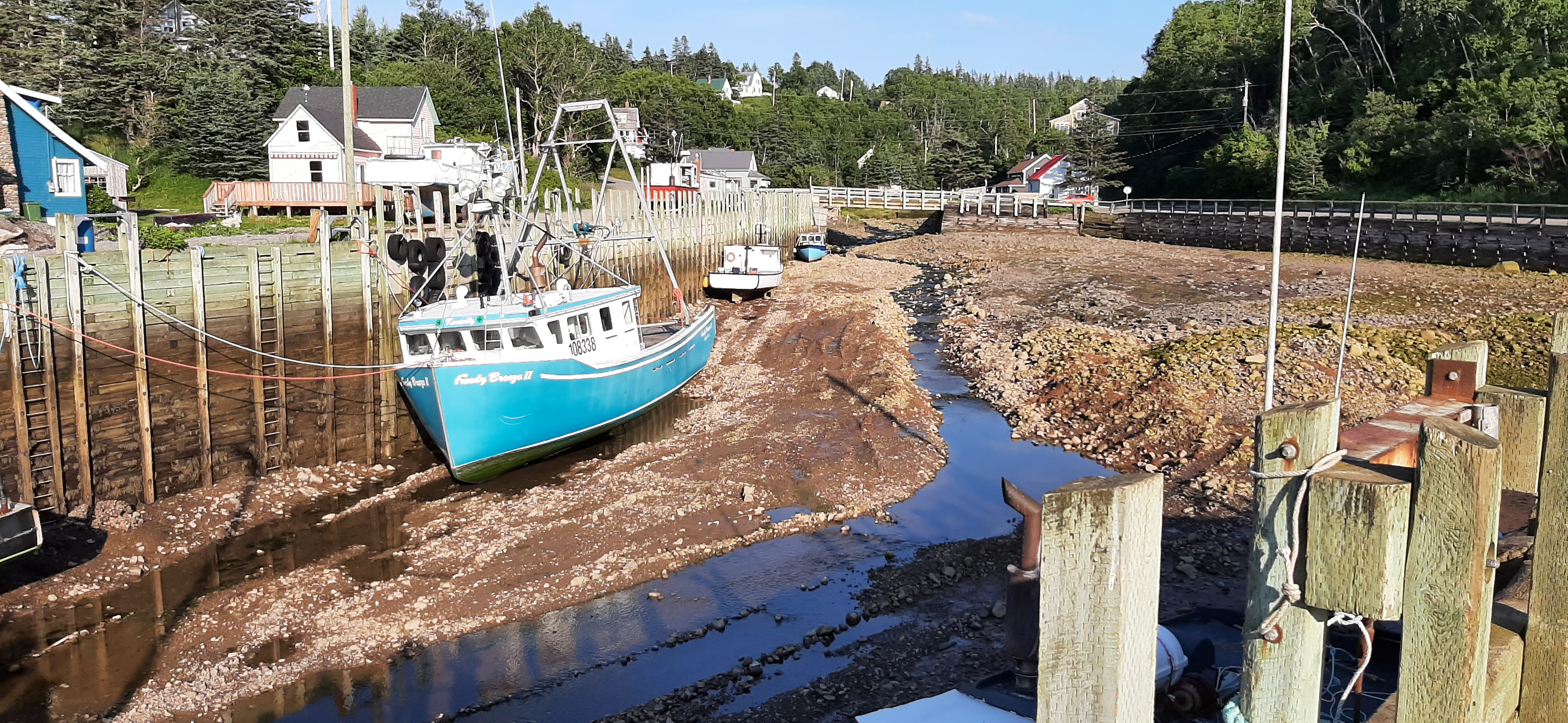
Harbourville at low tide

== History ==
The area of Harbourville was originally granted to the Best family of New England Planters. They did not settle at Harbourville but logged the land which gained the location the name of Shingle Log Brook. The land around the brook was purchased by John Given and James Owens in 1824. They settled at the brook a few years later, built a pier and carried out logging as the area became known as Givens Wharf. The Hamilton family joined the settlement in 1829. The community became first a logging, then shipbuilding and trading centre exporting lumber and agricultural products from farms in the Berwick area of Annapolis Valley in the 1840s and 50s. On March 13, 1860 residents voted to choose the name Harbourville, reflecting the sheltered harbour created by the brook and piers. A Methodist church, which still stands as a United Church, was built in 1860 and a school house was built in the next year. The community declined in the late 19th century as timber resources were depleted and the Windsor and Annapolis Railway, later the Dominion Atlantic Railway, took over agricultural exports from the Annapolis Valley. The harbour continued to be used by inshore fishermen. Tourism became an industry in the early 20th century as a number of summer hotels operated, later replaced by summer cottages along the bay. Famous Hollywood actress Theda Bara owned a cottage in the area called "Baranook". Fishing and tourism remain the principle industry. Harbourville's wharves were always managed locally and never became part of the Small Craft Harbour program of the federal government. Maintenance and operation of the wharves were taken over by the Harbourville Restoration Society in 1999. The east wharf was restored by the society in 2003 and the west wharf was restored in 2009.

== Geography ==
The community is located on the coastal side of the North Mountain. The community is centered on the mouth of Givans Brook which widens to a tidal harbour protected by two wharves. Harbourville is the terminus of Nova Scotia Route 360 which connects the community to Exit 15 of the Highway 101 and the town of Berwick to the south. Harbourville includes the rural areas near it as far as Burlington to the south, Turners Brook to the west and Canada Creek to the east.
