= Woodville, Nova Scotia =

Community in Nova Scotia, Canada

Coordinates: 45°5′33.2″N 64°39′15.6″W

Woodville in Nova Scotia

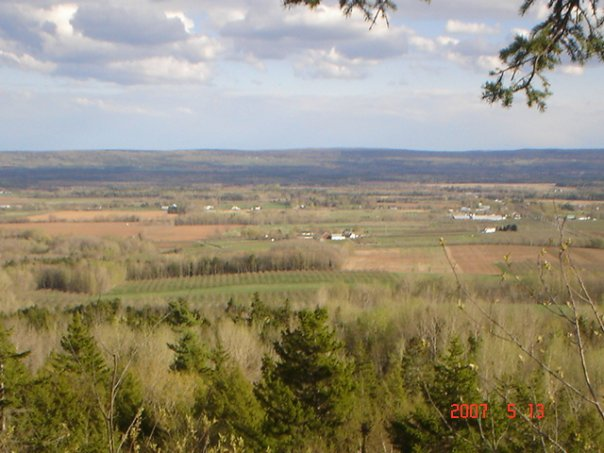
A view of Woodville from the North Mountain

Woodville is a community in Kings County of about 200 people located in the Annapolis Valley of Nova Scotia. The community is situated north of Cambridge and Waterville at the foot of the North Mountain. Centred along Route 221, Woodville has a volunteer fire department, a Baptist church, two auto body shops, a home run automotive mechanic business, and many family-run farms. It is administratively part of the village of Cornwallis Square. A community centre is located in the former school, built in 1942. The former Wesley Knox United Church, built in 1921, was sold in 2006 is now a residence and artist's workshop.

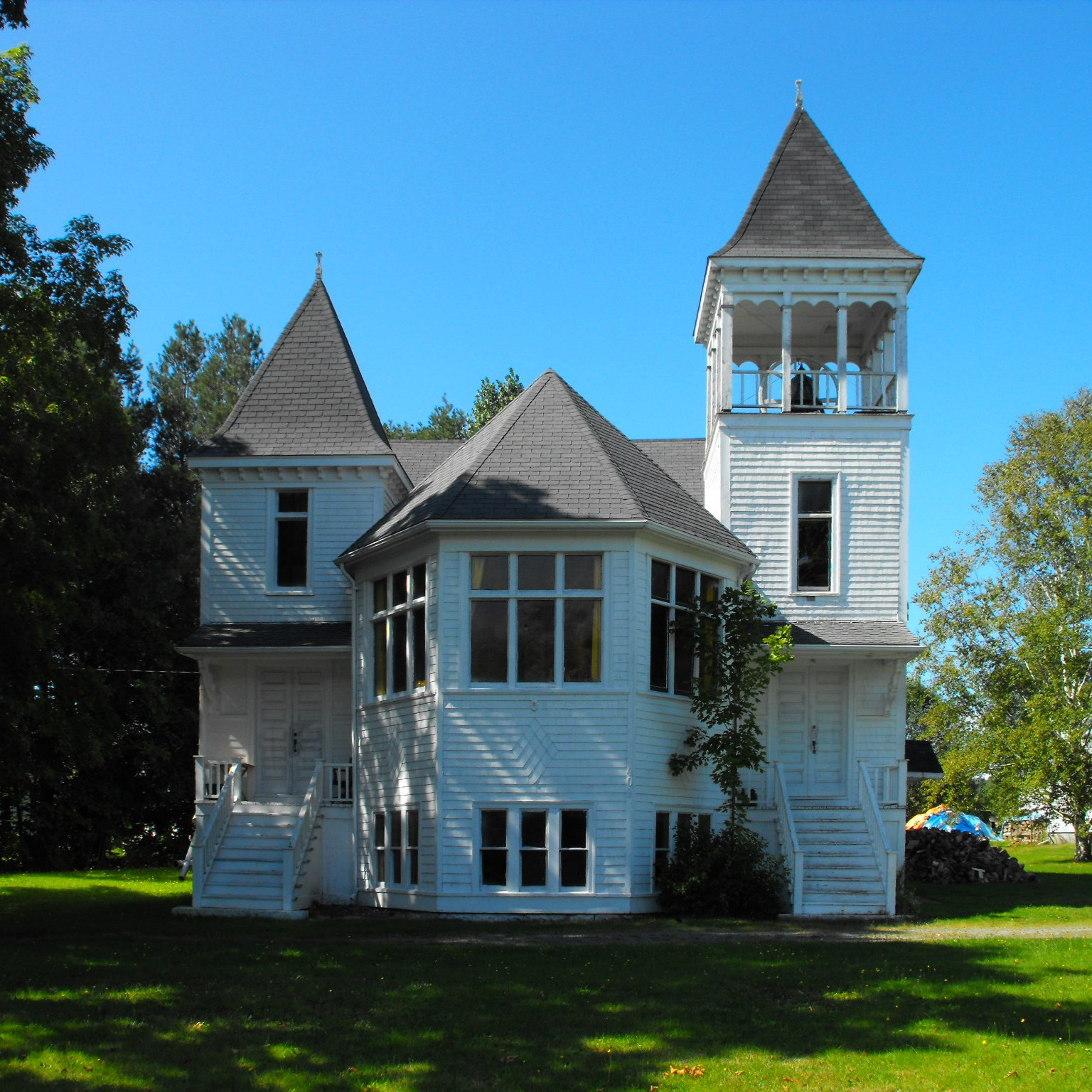
The former United Church in Woodville, Nova Scotia. It is now used by a wooden door maker.

Each spring during the Annapolis Valley Apple Blossom Festival, the community comes together to stage a chicken barbecue on Boates' farm the Sunday of the festival, which is known for its chicken recipe that draws visitors from nearby towns.

The community was settled in the early 1800s by New England Planters who were spreading westward from their initial settlements in the Canning area. It was first known as Kinsmans Corner, after the Kinsman family who ran an early store in the centre of the community but it was renamed "Woodville" in 1864 by residents who voted to name it after Samuel Wood, an early settler, who purchased land there in 1807. Samuel Wood's house is one of the oldest houses in Woodville located on the south side of Rte 221 across from the Boates farm.

Woodville became a stop on the Cornwallis Valley Railway branchline of the Dominion Atlantic Railway in 1914 which greatly stimulated apple production and export. Four large apple warehouses and a station were built in Woodville. The railway operated in Woodville until 1961. The apple industry declined after the Second World War and farmers diversified into other crops, although many large orchards remain in operation around Woodville. Major apple growers in the past included Howard Bligh, W. B. Burgess and Robert Leslie, who became a major leader in apple marketing in Nova Scotia. In later years, the Foote and Boates families became noted apple growers.

Margaret Dorothy Atwood (née Killam), the mother of the famous Canadian writer Margaret Atwood, was born in Woodville. Margaret Dorothy's father, Dr. Harold Edwin Killam, served as community doctor for many years.
