= Nova Scotia Route 359 =

Highway in Nova Scotia, Canada

Route 359

Route information
- Maintained by Nova Scotia Department of Transportation and Infrastructure Renewal
- Length: 16 km (9.9 mi)

Major junctions
- South end: Route 341 in Kentville
- Route 221 in Centreville
- North end: Cove Road in Halls Harbour

Location
- Country: Canada
- Province: Nova Scotia

Highway system
- Provincial highways in Nova Scotia; 100-series
← Route 358	→ Route 360

Route 359 is a collector road in the Canadian province of Nova Scotia.

It is located in Kings County and connects Kentville near Trunk 1 with Halls Harbour.

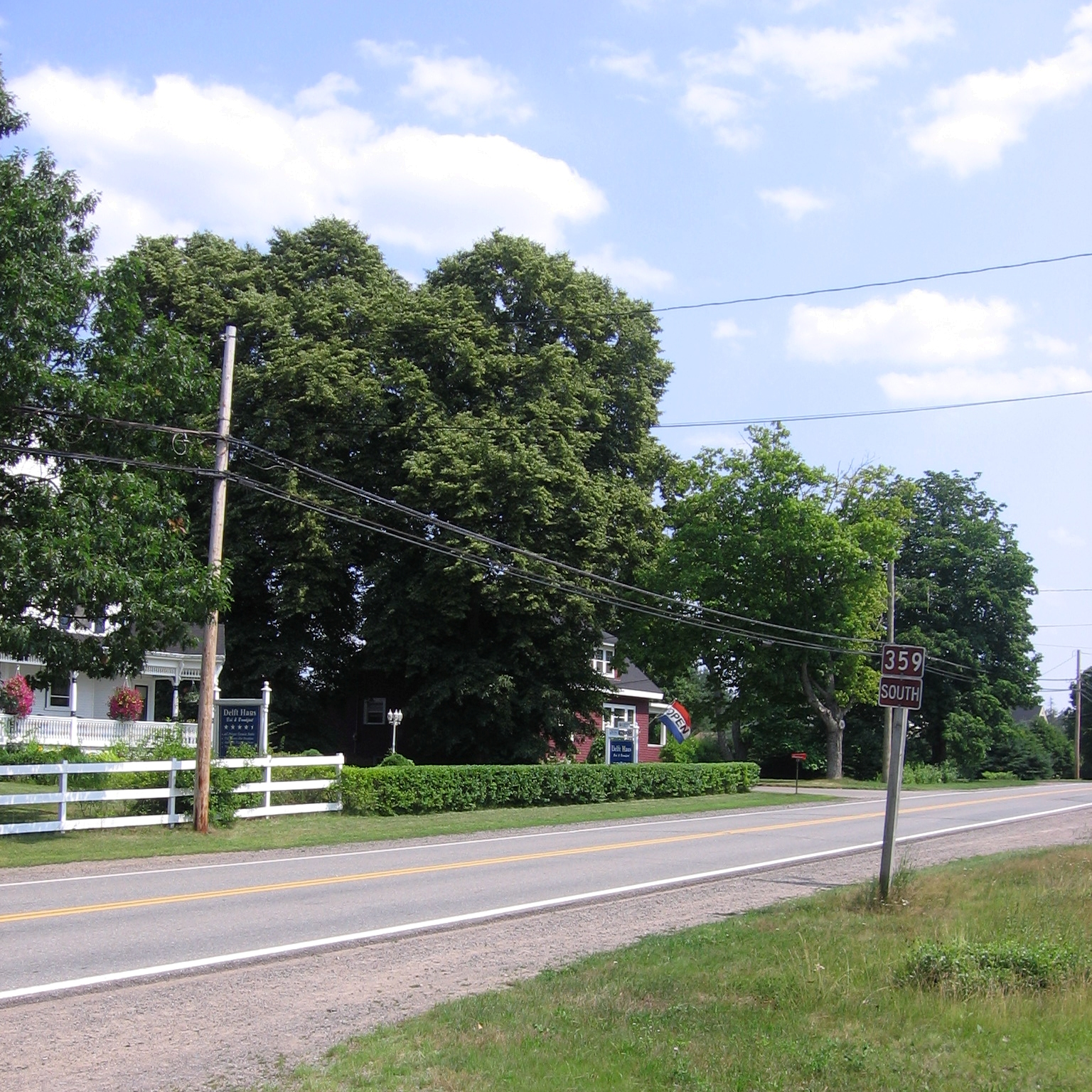
NS Route 359 in Centreville

== Communities ==
- Kentville
- Aldershot
- Steam Mill Village
- Centreville
- East Halls Harbour Road
- Halls Harbour

== See also ==
- List of Nova Scotia provincial highways
