= Nova Scotia Youth Centre =

Youth detention centre in Nova Scotia, Canada

- Location in Nova Scotia
- Location: 1442 County Home Road Waterville, Nova Scotia; 45.0531°N 64.6669°W
- Status: Operational
- Capacity: 120
- Opened: 1988
- Managed by: Department of Justice

The Nova Scotia Youth Centre, commonly known as Waterville, is the only youth correctional centre in the Canadian province of Nova Scotia. Opened in 1988, the facility is operated by the Nova Scotia Department of Justice in the rural community of Waterville, Kings County.

== History ==
The Nova Scotia Youth Centre was built in response to the Young Offenders Act, which came into force in 1984. It opened in July 1988 with a capacity of 120.

In the 1990s, Waterville consistently operated over capacity. In response, the province expanded the Shelburne Youth Centre in 1995.

The Youth Criminal Justice Act (YCJA), which came into force in 2003, provides more restorative justice options for youth and compels youth courts to consider options other than custodial sentences. As a result, the population held at both Waterville and Shelburne dropped sharply. In 2004, the Shelburne Youth Centre was closed and the remaining inmates were transferred to Waterville. In 2022/23, it was reported that Waterville held an average of less than 10 people per day.

A riot took place at the youth centre on 4 September 2016, resulting in serious injuries to five staff. Several inmates were arrested. Speaking in the provincial legislature, Justice Minister Diana Whalen stated that no such incident had ever before taken place at the facility. The Nova Scotia Government Employees Union criticized the door control system at Waterville for allowing the melee to take place. The Canadian Press requested, under Nova Scotia's freedom of information legislation, the results of a probe that the justice department had launched over the incident. Although the Information and Privacy Commissioner ruled in favour of the Canadian Press, as of 2022 the government refused to release the information, citing security concerns.

== Abuse allegations ==
A March 1995 report by Viki Samuels-Stewart, commissioned by the Nova Scotia Department of Justice, found that young offenders were victims of abuse at both the Shelburne and Waterville youth centres. Some employees at Waterville testified that they had witnessed such abuses. One of the changes made in response to the report was to require the presence of two employees during pat searches, except during emergencies.

In 2019, the Royal Canadian Mounted Police (RCMP) launched an investigation, called Operation Headwind, into allegations of sexual abuse at the youth centre between 1988 and 2017. In July 2023, the police announced that they had gathered statements from 70 males who said they were abused at Waterville, and had launched a special hotline to gather more information. In July 2023, the police stated that there could be as many as 200 abuse survivors. In September 2025, after having interviewed over 450 survivors and witnesses, the RCMP arrested the former swim instructor at Waterville, who was charged with 66 sex-related offences involving 30 victims. He was released on bail. Police stated that they believe there are more survivors and witnesses who had not yet come forward and encouraged them to do so.
