= Ransford Dodsworth Bucknam =

Canadian-born admiral of the Ottoman Empire

- Bucknam circa 1910
- Born: June 7, 1869; Halls Harbour, Nova Scotia
- Died: May 27, 1915 (aged 45); Istanbul
- Other name: Pasha Bucknam

Ransford Dodsworth Bucknam (June 7, 1869 – May 27, 1915) was a Nova Scotian who became a Pasha, an admiral in the Turkish navy and vice-admiral to the Ottoman Empire. Bucknam was decorated with the Star of the Order of Osmanieh, the distinguished Service Medal, and other medals.

== Biography ==
Bucknam was born in Halls Harbour, Nova Scotia, on June 7, 1869, to Isabella Roscoe and Ezra Taylor Bucknam.

He lived there until his parents both died when he was eight. He then moved with his paternal grandparents to Eatonville, Nova Scotia. He moved to the United States and married Rose Thayer on January 2, 1904, in Philadelphia, Pennsylvania.

He joined the Turkish Navy in 1905. He most notably blockaded Tripolitania to Italian soldiers during the Italo-Turkish War. He retired from Turkish service when he was asked to renounce his United States citizenship in 1911.

He then became involved in the oil business.

He died from heart failure in Istanbul on May 27, 1915, after several weeks of severe illness.

== Memberships ==
He was a member of the following organizations:

- Pen & Pencil Club
- Lotus Club
- International Club at Panama
- Boston Marine Society
- Constantinople Club in Constantinople

== Legacy ==
He is the namesake of Bucknam Park, Halls Harbour, Nova Scotia
