= Alfred Fuller =

Canada-born American businessman (1885–1973)

- Born: January 13, 1885; Welsford, Nova Scotia, Canada
- Died: December 4, 1973 (aged 88); Hartford, Connecticut, U.S.
- Resting place: Pleasant Valley Cemetery in Somerset, Nova Scotia
- Known for: Founder of the Fuller Brush Company

Alfred Carl Fuller (January 13, 1885 – December 4, 1973) was a Canadian-born American businessman, entrepreneur, and philanthropist who was the original "Fuller Brush Man". He created the Fuller Brush Company, a multi-million dollar corporation.

== Biography ==
=== Early years ===
Alfred C. Fuller was born on an Annapolis Valley farm in Welsford, Kings County, Nova Scotia, Canada. He was the eleventh of twelve children of Leander and Phoebe (Collins) Fuller. With the encouragement of his parents to find a career, he moved to Boston, Massachusetts in 1903 at the age of 18 to live with his sister.

=== Career Development ===
He went to work for the Somerville Brush and Mop Company, and became a successful salesman for them. A self-described country bumpkin, he felt his success was attributed to his farm-boy charm, his ability to make his customer feel comfortable and his full money-back guarantee.

In 1906, with a $75.00 investment, he started the Fuller Brush Company in Hartford, Connecticut, manufacturing brushes in his sister's basement and selling these brushes door to door. By 1919, the company had achieved sales of more than $1 million per year.

=== Corporate Influence ===
Fuller Brush went on to be recognized throughout North America, even inspiring two comedy films, The Fuller Brush Man (1948) and The Fuller Brush Girl (1950). In 1961, Fuller recorded the secrets to his success on Folkways Records on an album entitled, Careers in Selling: An Interview with Alfred C. Fuller. The company remained in the Fuller family's hands until 1968, when it was acquired by Sara Lee Corporation.

=== Personal life ===
In 1908, Fuller married Evelyn Winnifred Ells, a fellow Nova Scotian living in Boston. Evelyn worked alongside Alfred acting as his secretary, accountant and working in sales as well. She is credited with outselling Alfred two to one. The couple had two sons, Alfred Howard born in 1913, and Avard Ells born in 1916. Alfred C. Fuller and Evelyn Ells Fuller were divorced in 1930.

In 1932 Fuller married Mary Primrose (Pelton) from Yarmouth, Nova Scotia, Canada at New York City. Primrose was 19 years younger than Alfred and they remained married until Alfred's death. The couple, living at West Hartford, Connecticut, were well-known benefactors and supporters of various community organizations including the Hartt School of Music at the University of Hartford, The Hartford Opera, The Hartford Symphony and the Bushnell Memorial. Both were active board members of Board of Regents for the University of Hartford. Primrose was awarded an honorary doctorate degree at this university in recognition of her contribution and support.

Alfred's sons would take over the business in the capacity of president; Howard, led the company from 1943 until his death in an automobile accident in 1959, at which time Avard took over the helm until 1969.

Fuller maintained a lifelong connection with his native Nova Scotia, buying a home in Yarmouth, Nova Scotia, Canada where he and his family spent their summers. The home, known as the Pelton-Fuller House was originally purchased by Primrose's maternal grandparents. Primrose's mother, Susan (Bown) Pelton, resided in the home until her death in 1965. The Fuller family then used the home as their summer house. In 1996, Primrose donated the house, at 20 Collins Street, to the Yarmouth County Museum where it has been restored and is open to the public.

Fuller was initiated to the York Rite of Freemasonry, till his elevation to the highest degree of Grand Master. He was a major supporter of what is now The Hartt School, University of Hartford. The Alfred C. Fuller Music Center was built in 1963 on the college campus.

=== Death ===
Fuller died in Hartford, Connecticut, in 1973 at the age of 88 of myeloma. He is buried at Pleasant Valley Cemetery in Somerset, Nova Scotia, approximately 4 kilometres (2.5 mi) from his birthplace.
