= Buckleys Corner, Nova Scotia =

Locality in Nova Scotia, Canada

Coordinates: 45°5′44.74″N 64°41′41.57″W

Buckleys Corner in Nova Scotia

Buckleys Corner is a crossroads in the Canadian province of Nova Scotia, located in Kings County. Located just north of Waterville, Nova Scotia, it is part of the rural community of Grafton, Nova Scotia.
