= Charles Macdonald Concrete House Museum =

Residential structure in Nova Scotia, Canada

Coordinates: 45.1263°N 64.5233°W

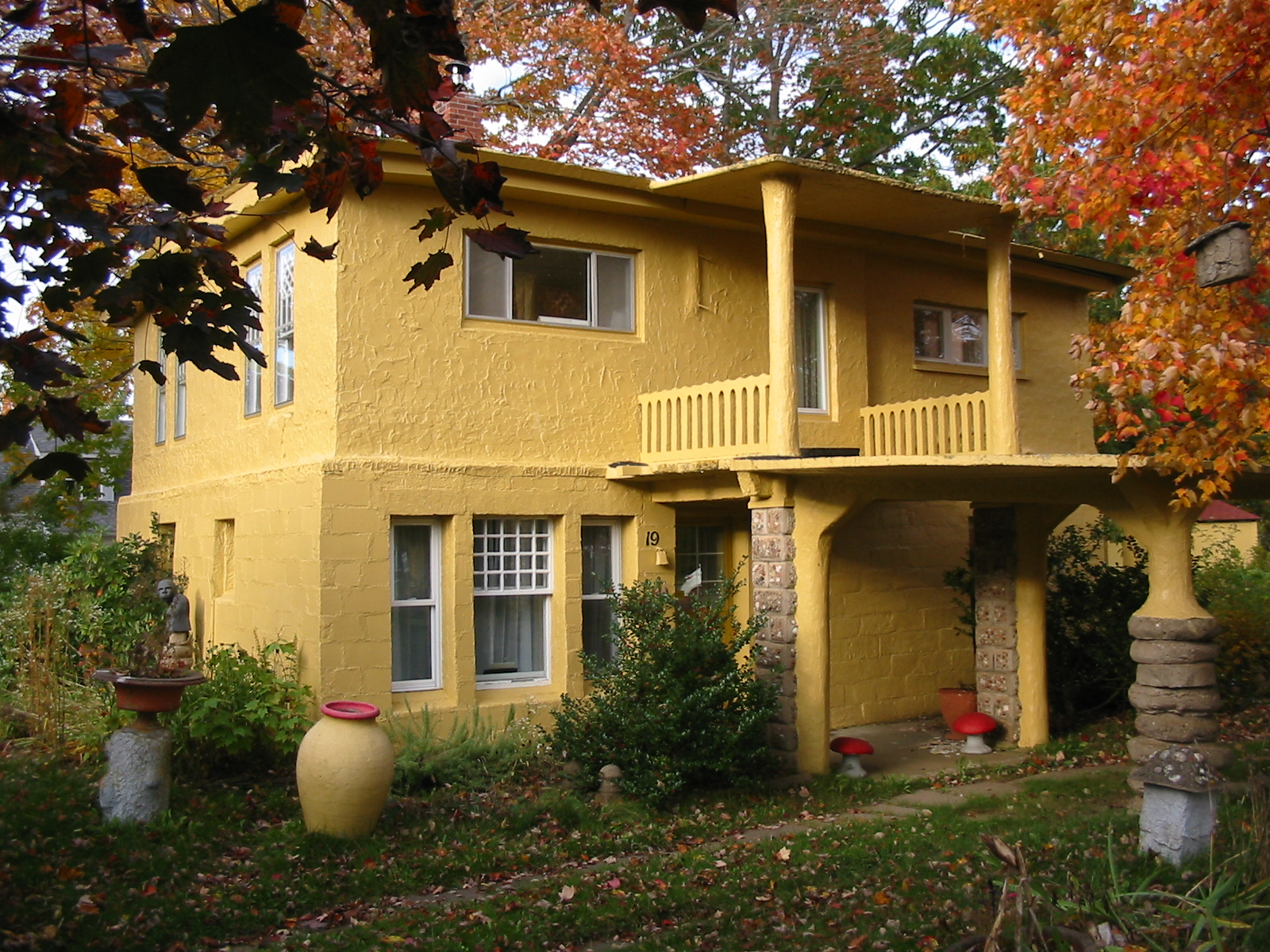
Charles Macdonald Concrete House est. 1910

The Charles Macdonald Concrete House is a two-storey residential structure located in Centreville, Nova Scotia, Canada. It was built entirely out of reinforced concrete in 1910 by Charles Macdonald, a folk artist, socialist and owner of a cement brick factory.

== History ==
Charles Macdonald was born April 5, 1874, in Centreville, a small rural community located in the Annapolis Valley of Nova Scotia. Macdonald learned basic carpentry skills while working at local industries - including a coffin factory and a carriage factory - and during his tenure as a ships carpenter between 1898 and 1908. During a four-month voyage to Brazil, Macdonald became interested in the local architecture, which included compact Spanish blockhouses.

Macdonald resided in Vancouver from 1908 to 1910 where he joined the Socialist Party of Canada. Macdonald returned to Nova Scotia in 1910, and established his company, Kentville Concrete, operating the business according to his Socialist philosophy. In 1916 Macdonald married Mabel Misner and converted the one-storey concrete factory into a two-storey residence, relocating the factory to nearby Brooklyn Street.

The interior of the house makes extensive use of concrete, including the central hearth adorned with bas-relief paintings, the stairs, and the bathtub. Exterior elements include a concrete fence, concrete garden sculptures, and decorative concrete animals.

Macdonald died May 28, 1967, leaving the concrete home in the care of the community of Centreville, Kings County. By 1995 the property was in disrepair and a local active heritage enthusiast collected funds in order to purchase the house from the town. The Charles Macdonald House of Centreville Society has managed the property since then.

Today the house is a seasonally operated, free entry museum which features the artwork of Charles Macdonald, and rugs hooked by his wife Mabel.

The Charles Macdonald Concrete House was declared a Provincially Registered Heritage Property in 1998.

== Faerie cottages ==
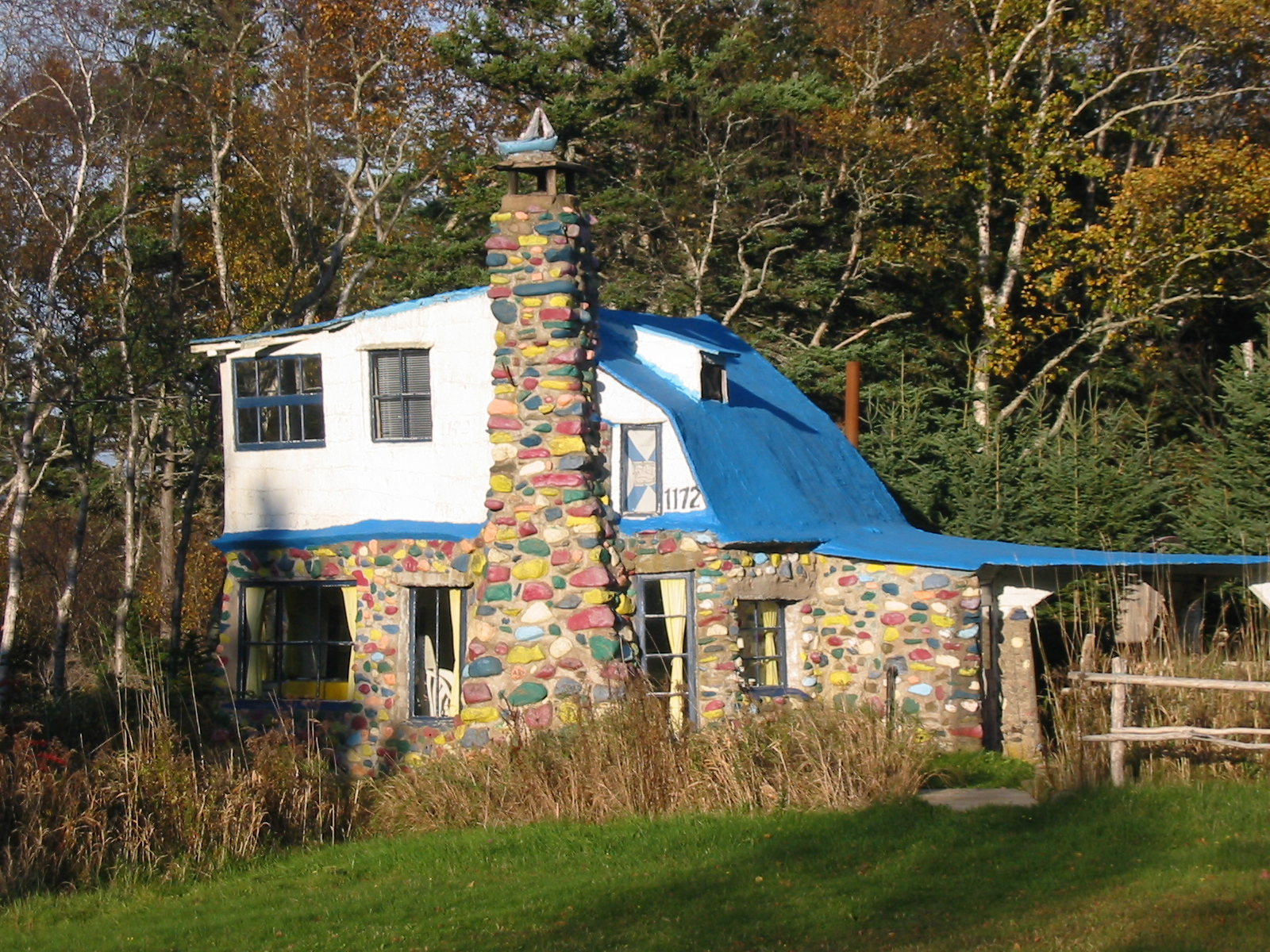
Blue Cottage

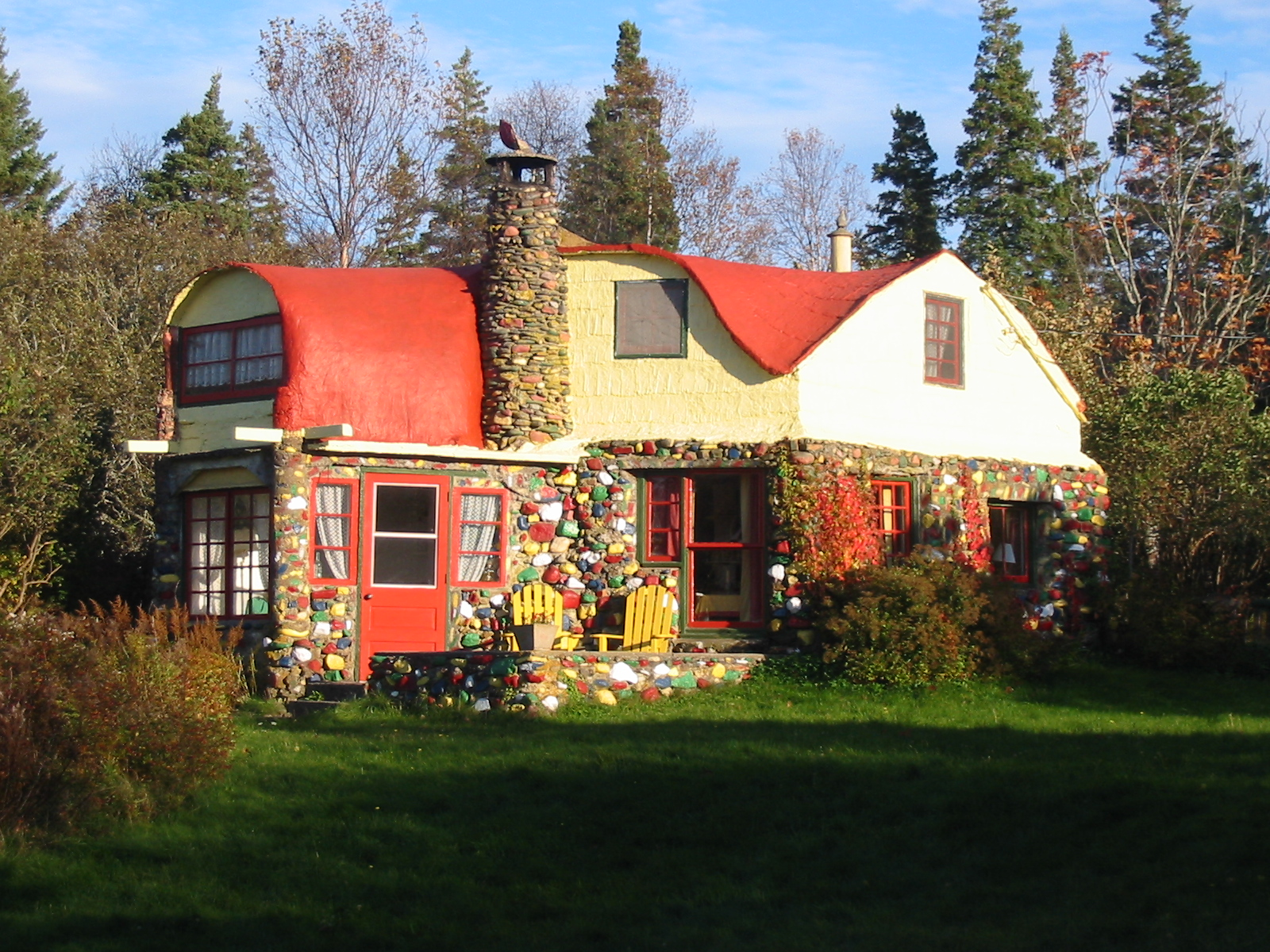
Macdonald Cottage

During the Great Depression of the 1930s, and facing a lull in customers, Macdonald embarked on a building project in nearby Huntington Point, constructing five concrete cottages overlooking the Bay of Fundy between 1934 and 1938. These brightly painted, highly whimsical structures have been described as "the sort of cottages in which Snow White and her seven dwarfs might have lived". Macdonald and his wife retained one cottage for themselves, and the others were rented until Macdonald befriended prospective buyers whom he trusted enough to care for them properly.

Four of the cottages survive today: the Green Cottage, the Jefferson Cottage, the Blue Cottage and the Macdonald Cottage. The fifth, called the Teapot Cottage, was destroyed by the owners in 1982.

The Blue Cottage was declared a Provincially Registered Heritage Property in 1998.

== See also ==
- List of museums in Nova Scotia
