= Melanson, Nova Scotia =

Community in Nova Scotia, Canada

Coordinates: 45°4′29.47″N 64°18′56.45″W

Melanson in Nova Scotia

Melanson is a community in the Canadian province of Nova Scotia, located in Kings County.
