= Centreville, Kings, Nova Scotia =

Community in Nova Scotia, Canada

Coordinates: 45°8′1.97″N 64°31′42.73″W

Centreville is a rural community in the Canadian province of Nova Scotia, located in Kings County. The community is situated 10 kilometres north of Kentville on Route 359. As of 2021, the population was 1,159. Route 359 and Route 221 cross at the settlement. The village was once a junction on the Cornwallis Valley Railway branchline of the Dominion Atlantic Railway.

== Demographics ==
In the 2021 Census of Population conducted by Statistics Canada, Centreville had a population of 1,159 living in 500 of its 511 total private dwellings, a change of 2.7% from its 2016 population of 1,129. With a land area of 2.36 km^{2} (0.91 sq mi), it had a population density of 491.1/km^{2} (1,271.9/sq mi) in 2021.

== Notable residents ==
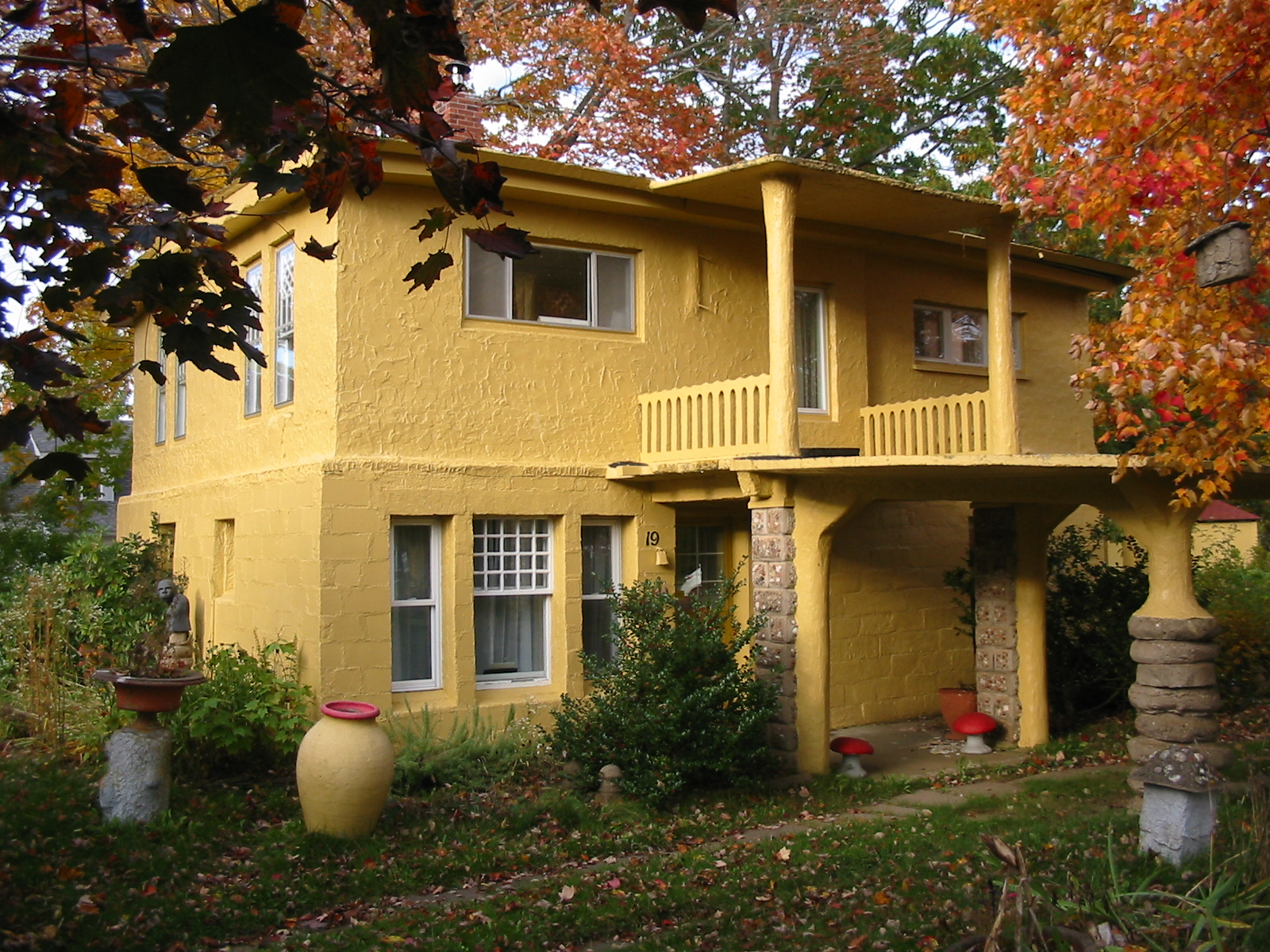
Charles Macdonald Concrete House

Centreville was home to the 1930s artist, Charles Macdonald, famous for his work in concrete. His innovative concrete home in Centreville is now the Charles Macdonald Concrete House Museum. Another important Centreville resident was Roscoe Fillmore, a well-known gardener, greenhouse operator, Marxist, and author. Macdonald and Fillmore were members of a group of moderate leftists who regularly met in Centreville during the 1930s and 40s and became known as "the Centreville Socialists".
