= Ogilvie, Nova Scotia =

Community in Nova Scotia, Canada

Ogilvie
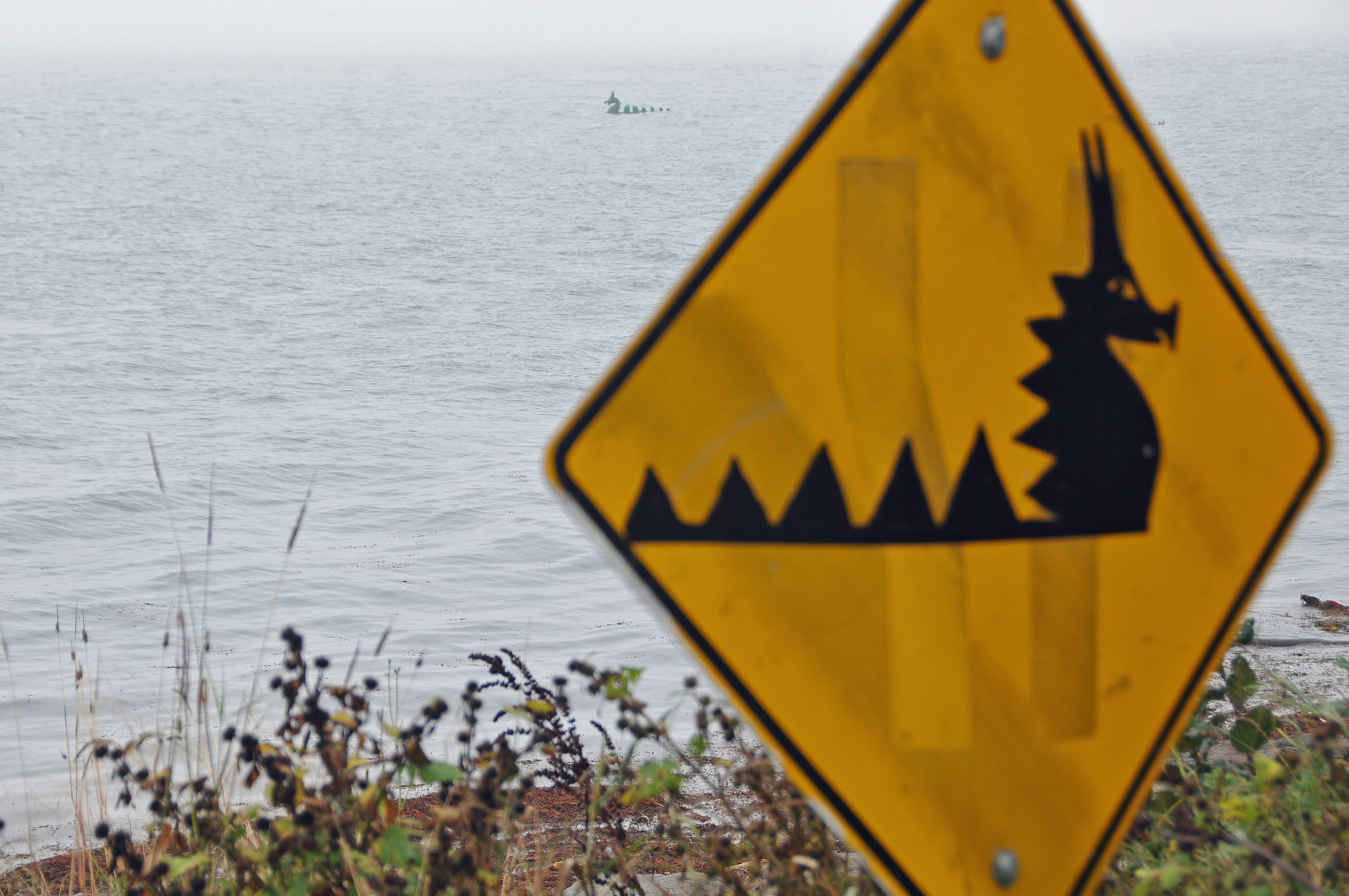
- A sea serpent crafted by local man David Taylor is seen off the shores of Ogilvie in 2011.
- Interactive map of Ogilvie
- Coordinates: 45.12439165939608°N 64.84554425302052°W
- Country: Canada
- Province: Nova Scotia
- County: Kings County

Ogilvie is a community in the Canadian province of Nova Scotia, located in Kings County. It is located between the communities of Burlington and Harbourville.

== Name ==
Along with the Scots and Turners, the Ogilvies were one of the first families to settle the area. The area is named after them.
