= Cornwallis River =

Coordinates: 45°6′5″N 64°21′54.7″W

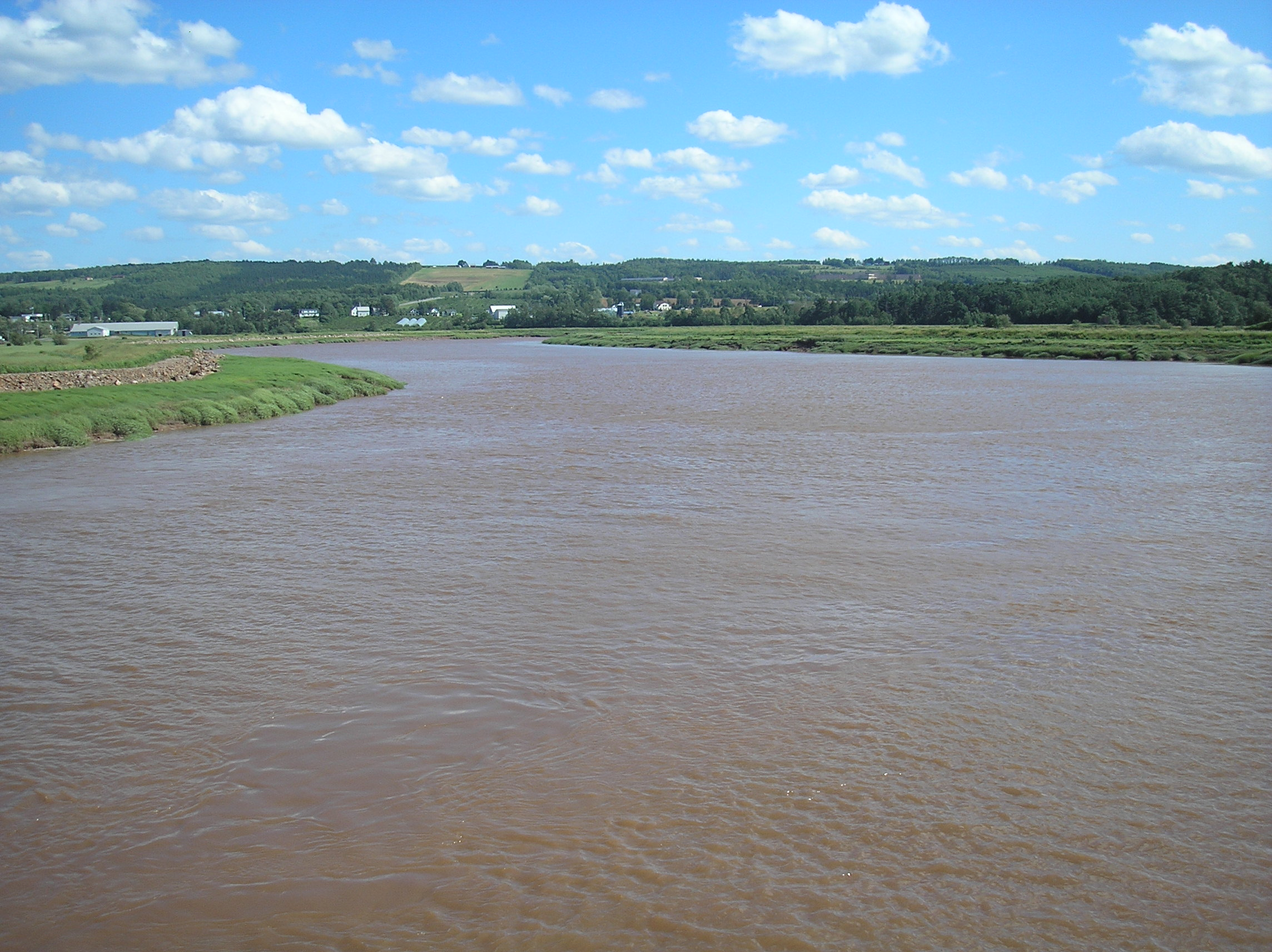

Location
- Country: Canada
- Province: Nova Scotia

Physical characteristics
- Source
  - location: North Mountain
- Mouth
  - location: Minas Basin
  - elevation: sea level
- Length: 48 km (30 mi)

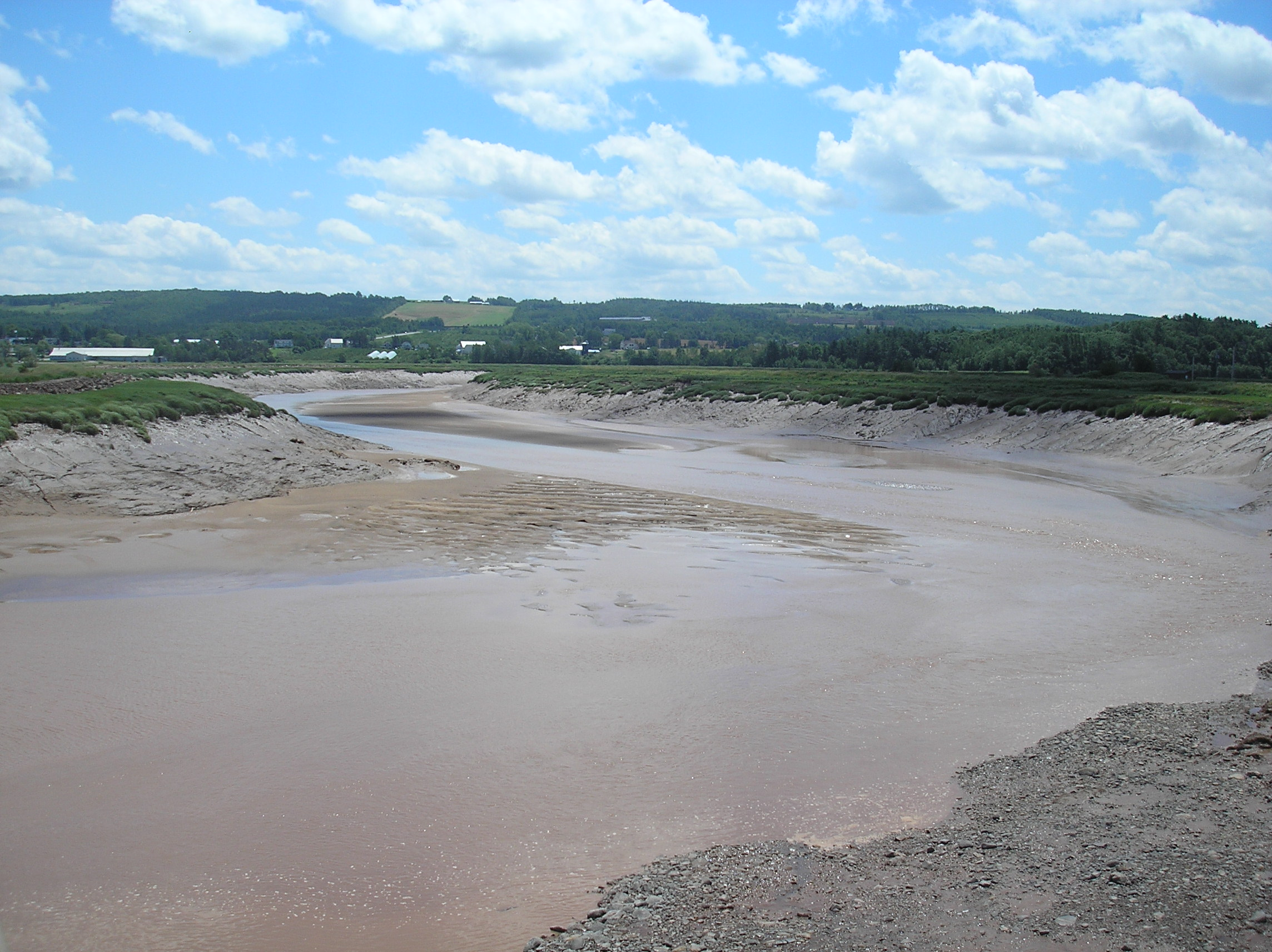
Cornwallis River near low tide

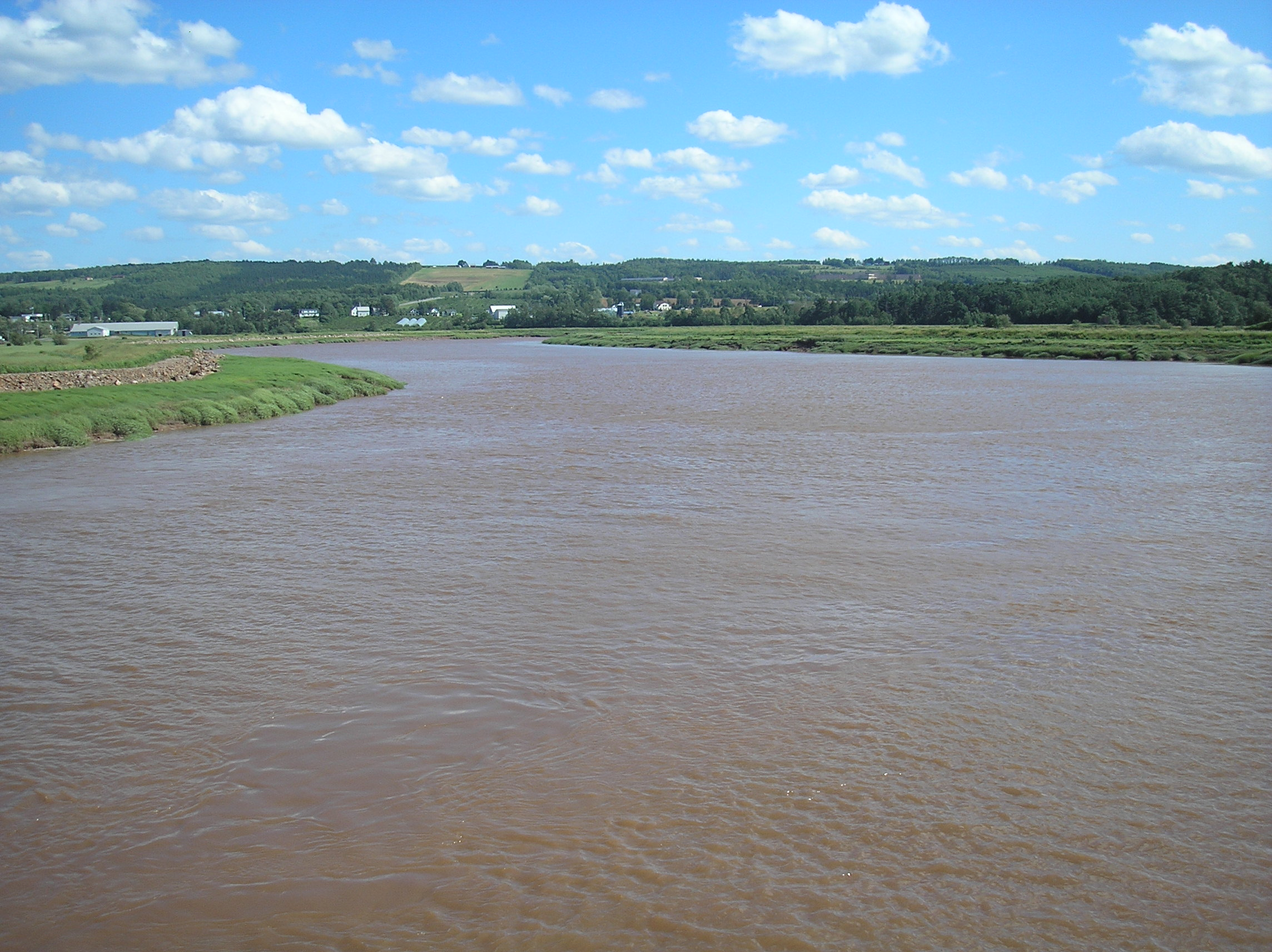
Cornwallis River near high tide

The Cornwallis River is in Kings County, Nova Scotia, Canada. It has a meander length of approximately 48 kilometres (30 mi) through eastern Kings County, from its source on the North Mountain at Grafton to its mouth near Wolfville on the Minas Basin. The lower portion of the river beginning at Kentville is tidal and there are extensive tidal marshes in the lower reaches. In its upper watershed at Berwick, the river draws on the Caribou Bog while a longer branch continues to the official source, a stream on the North Mountain at Grafton.

== History ==
The original peoples of the area, the Mi'kmaq, knew it as The Narrow River, or Chijekwtook(pronounced, "Gee-gee-wok-tuk"). There are also references to the Mi'kmaq calling the river Jijuktu'kwejk. The river served as part of the Mi'kmaq travel route between the Minas Basin and the Annapolis Basin.

The river was named Riviere St. Antoine by Samuel de Champlain after his arrival in the New World in the early 17th Century. Later it was called the Riviere des Habitants by the Acadians, who built a series of settlements around its mouth including the village of Grand-Pré and a smaller settlement further up the river at New Minas. The Acadians also built extensive dykelands in the area, although there is no clear evidence that the running dykes beside the river were built by them.

Following the Expulsion of the Acadians in 1755, the area was settled by New England Planters in 1760 who named the river after the townships established along its banks. The river became known as the Horton River. after Horton Township, the major Planter settlement at the mouth of the river, named after the ancestral home of George Montagu-Dunk, the official in charge of English settlement in Nova Scotia. However, in the 19th century, settlement and commercial growth moved upriver to the Kentville area in Cornwallis Township, named after Edward Cornwallis, first governor of Nova Scotia. As a result, the river assumed the name Cornwallis River by 1829.

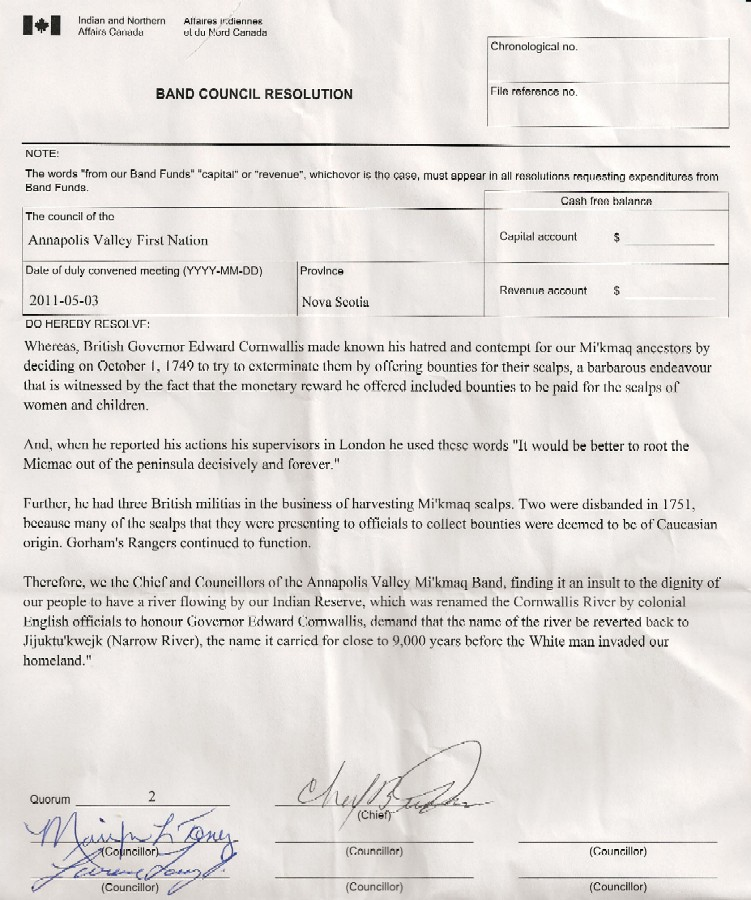
AVFN Band Council Resolution, May 3, 2011, regarding reverting river name to Jijuktu'kwejk

The Mi'kmaq of Annapolis Valley First Nation in Cambridge, Nova Scotia, voted unanimously in 2011 to have the name revert to what they consider to be the original, historical Mi'kmaw name for the river, the Jijuktu'kwejk. Annapolis Valley First Nations Chief Brian Toney wants the name of the Cornwallis River changed. He said band members have to cross it every day and are reminded of Gov. Edward Cornwallis. Cornwallis put a bounty on the scalps of natives, including women and children in 1749 during the frontier warfare that followed the founding of Halifax. The proposal has led to a debate about renaming and the portrayal of history. The provincial government is in the process of considering the request.

== Transportation ==
The river was an important early transportation route, connected by a portage trail through the Berwick area to the headwaters of the Annapolis River that was originally established by the Mi'kmaq. Coastal schooners used landings and wharves along the river as far as Kentville while larger sailing vessels and later steamships used Port Williams for agricultural and timber exports. The Cornwallis Valley Railway, a branch line of the Dominion Atlantic Railway, was named after the river in 1889, when it was built, crossing the river at Kentville.

== Ecology ==
The Annapolis Valley is an important agricultural district in Nova Scotia and depends on the river for irrigation and drainage. However heavy agricultural runoffs as well as municipal sewage have created severe pollution problems in the river. It was designated as one of Canada's ten most endangered rivers in 2002 and labelled as "little more than a farm sewer". A number of initiatives are currently underway to improve farm use of the river and upgrade municipal sewage systems along the river. The communities of Wolfville, Port Williams, Kentville and Berwick all have sewage treatment facilities that discharge effluent into the river.

== Communities ==
- Kentville
- New Minas
- Port Williams
- Berwick
- Grand-Pré
- Wolfville
- Cornwallis Square

== See also ==
- List of rivers of Nova Scotia
