= Dempseys Corner, Nova Scotia =

Community in Nova Scotia, Canada

Coordinates: 45°3′7.41″N 64°50′59.61″W

Dempseys Corner in Nova Scotia

Dempseys Corner is a community in the Canadian province of Nova Scotia, located in Kings County. The first land grant in the area was provided to Andrew Beckwith in 1783.
