= Benjamin Bridge, Nova Scotia =

Community in Nova Scotia, Canada

Coordinates: 45°4′0.67″N 64°22′41.71″W

Benjamin Bridge in Nova Scotia

Benjamin Bridge is a place in the Canadian province of Nova Scotia, located in Kings County. It is located between the communities of Gaspereau and White Rock.
