= Montmorency Township, Michigan =

- Civil township
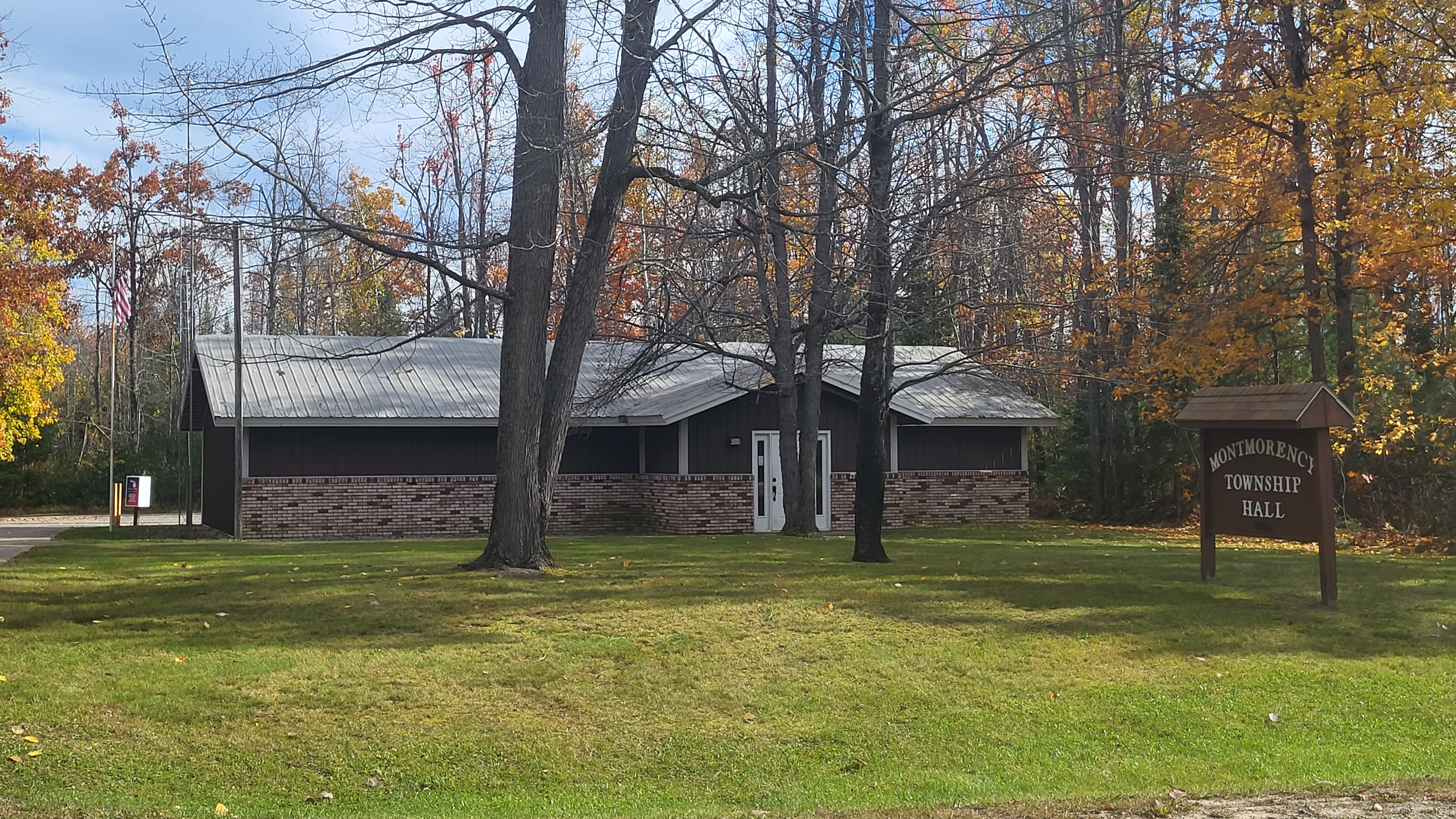
- Montmorency Township Hall

- Location within Montmorency County (red) and the administered CDP of Canada Creek Ranch (pink)

- Location within the state of Michigan Location within the United States
- Coordinates: 45°09′26″N 84°10′05″W
- Country: United States
- State: Michigan
- County: Montmorency
- Established: 1881

Government
  - Supervisor: Kelly Bennett
  - Clerk: Connie Brandt

Area
  - Total: 140.47 sq mi (363.82 km^{2})
  - Land: 136.61 sq mi (353.82 km^{2})
  - Water: 3.86 sq mi (10.00 km^{2})
- Elevation: 902 ft (275 m)

Population (2020)
  - Total: 1,016
  - Density: 7.44/sq mi (2.87/km^{2})
- Time zone: UTC-5 (Eastern (EST))
  - Summer (DST): UTC-4 (EDT)
- ZIP code(s): 49709 (Atlanta); 49746 (Hillman); 49751 (Johannesburg)
- Area code: 989
- FIPS code: 26-55240
- GNIS feature ID: 1626761
- Website: Official website

Montmorency Township is a civil township of Montmorency County in the U.S. state of Michigan. The population was 1,016 at the 2020 census.

== Geography ==
The township occupies the northern quarter of Montmorency County, extending from the Otsego County line in the west to the Alpena County line in the east. It is bordered to the north by Cheboygan and Presque Isle counties. The unincorporated community of Canada Creek Ranch is in the west-central part of the township. State highway M-33 crosses the center of the township, leading south to Atlanta, the county seat, and north to Onaway.

According to the U.S. Census Bureau, the township has a total area of 140.5 square miles (364 km^{2}), of which, 136.6 square miles (354 km^{2}) are land and 3.8 square miles (9.8 km^{2}), or 2.74%, are water. The western half of the township is drained by the north-flowing Black River and a major tributary, Canada Creek, while the eastern half is drained by the east-flowing North Branch of the Thunder Bay River.

== Demographics ==
As of the census of 2000, there were 1,202 people, 533 households, and 384 families residing in the township. The population density was 8.7 per square mile (3.4/km^{2}). There were 1,418 housing units at an average density of 10.3 per square mile (4.0/km^{2}). The racial makeup of the township was 98.59% White, 0.17% Native American, 0.08% Asian, and 1.16% from two or more races. Hispanic or Latino of any race were 0.33% of the population.

There were 533 households, out of which 20.3% had children under the age of 18 living with them, 63.8% were married couples living together, 5.6% had a female householder with no husband present, and 27.8% were non-families. 24.2% of all households were made up of individuals, and 14.3% had someone living alone who was 65 years of age or older. The average household size was 2.26 and the average family size was 2.63.

In the township the population was spread out, with 18.4% under the age of 18, 4.2% from 18 to 24, 19.1% from 25 to 44, 31.4% from 45 to 64, and 26.9% who were 65 years of age or older. The median age was 50 years. For every 100 females, there were 102.4 males. For every 100 females age 18 and over, there were 98.6 males.

The median income for a household in the township was $34,500, and the median income for a family was $39,034. Males had a median income of $31,786 versus $20,227 for females. The per capita income for the township was $17,701. About 7.1% of families and 8.6% of the population were below the poverty line, including 8.3% of those under age 18 and 6.5% of those age 65 or over.
