= Welsford, Kings, Nova Scotia =

Community in Nova Scotia, Canada

Coordinates: 45°5′13.44″N 64°45′25.9″W

Welsford in Nova Scotia

Welsford is a small community in the Canadian province of Nova Scotia, located in Kings County.

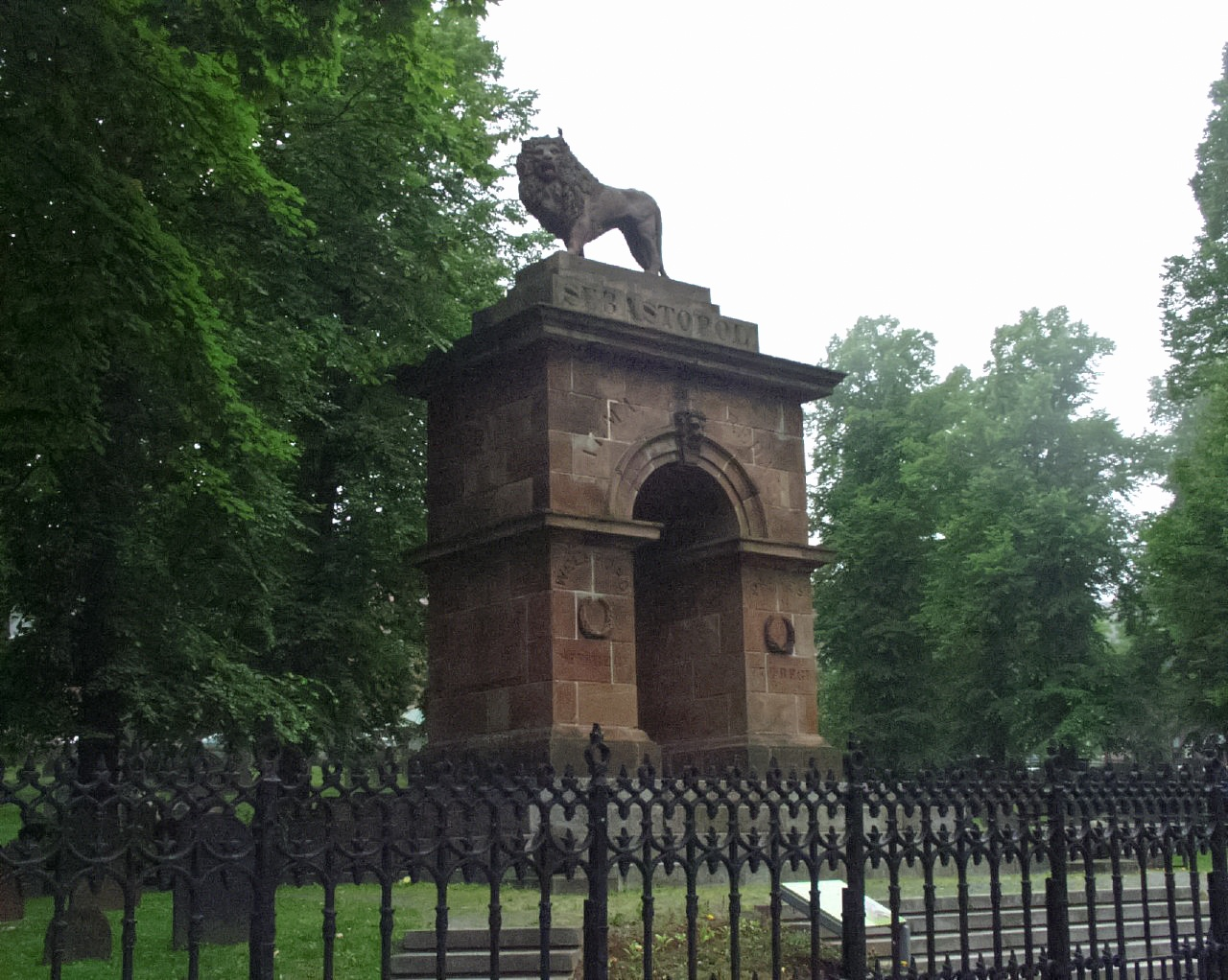
Welsford-Parker Monument, Halifax, Nova Scotia

It is one of two communities in Nova Scotia named after Augustus Frederick Welsford, a Nova Scotian war hero in the Crimean War, the other being Welsford, Pictou County (see the Welsford-Parker Monument). Nestled at the base of Nova Scotia's North Mountain, Welsford stretches along Route 221. Welsford is the birthplace of the entrepreneur Alfred Fuller, the "Fuller Brush Man".
