= Tremont, Nova Scotia =

Community in Nova Scotia, Canada

Coordinates: 44°57′6.92″N 64°56′1.8″W

Tremont in Nova Scotia

Tremont is a community in the Canadian province of Nova Scotia, located in Kings County.
