= Lake Paul, Nova Scotia =

Community in Nova Scotia, Canada

Coordinates: 44°51′47.41″N 64°40′44.72″W

Lake Paul in Nova Scotia

Lake Paul is a community in the Canadian province of Nova Scotia, located in Kings County. It is located to the east of the lake known by the same name.

It has a population of approximately 100 people.
