= Nova Scotia Route 341 =

Highway in Nova Scotia, Canada

Route 341

Route information
- Maintained by Nova Scotia Department of Transportation and Infrastructure Renewal
- Length: 10 km (6.2 mi)

Major junctions
- South end: Trunk 1 in Kentville
- Route 359 in Kentville
- North end: Route 358 in Canard

Location
- Country: Canada
- Province: Nova Scotia
- Counties: Kings
- Major cities: Kentville

Highway system
- Provincial highways in Nova Scotia; 100-series
← Route 340	→ Route 344

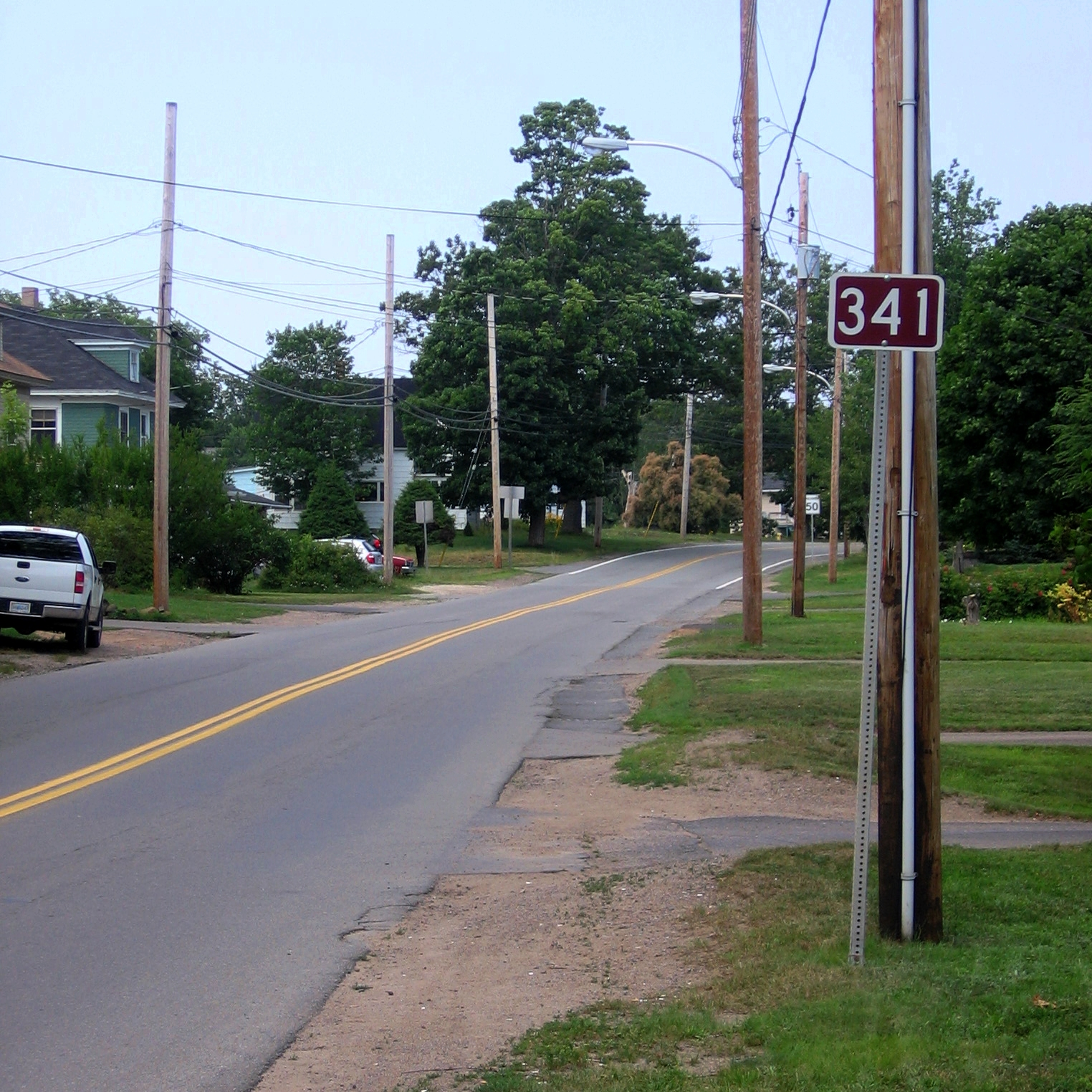
Start of NS Route 341 in Kentville, Nova Scotia

Route 341 is a collector road in the Canadian province of Nova Scotia.

It is located in Kings County and connects Kentville at Trunk 1 with Canard at Route 358.

The intersection of Route 341 with Route 358 is nicknamed "Jawbone Corner" by local residents.

== Communities ==
- Kentville
- Canard

== History ==
The entirety of Collector Highway 341 was designated as part of the Trunk Highway 41.

== See also ==
- List of Nova Scotia provincial highways
