= Cornwallis Square =

- Village
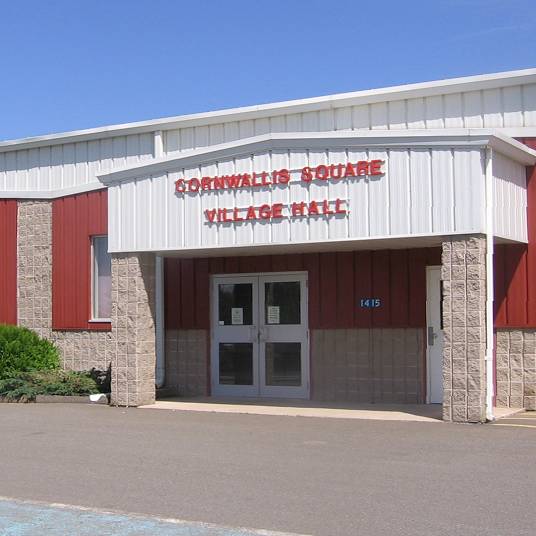
- Cornwallis Square Village Hall

- Location of Cornwallis Square, Nova Scotia
- Coordinates: 45°04′23″N 64°40′10″W
- Country: Canada
- Province: Nova Scotia
- County: Kings
- Incorporated: 1947
- Time zone: UTC-4 (AST)
  - Summer (DST): UTC-3 (ADT)
- Canadian Postal code: B0P 1CO
- Area code: 902

Cornwallis Square is a Canadian village in Kings County, Nova Scotia. It is located on the Cornwallis River. It is planning to rename itself to "King's Square", dropping "cornwallis", with permission from the Nova Scotia government.

== History ==
The village commission was originally established in 1947 as the WCG Commission and was responsible for fire protection, recreation and sidewalks in Waterville, Cambridge, and Grafton. When the rural community of Woodville was included in the service area in the 1960s the name was changed to Cornwallis Square.

The area's largest employer is Michelin.

In April 2025, the village commission voted to drop the name "Cornwallis" and rename the village to Kings Square. A First Nation reserve is within the boundary of the village and the policies of former Lieutenant-Governor Edward Cornwallis were odious to residents. The new name would reflect that the village is within Kings County.

== Climate ==
Climate data for Cornwallis Square
Month	Jan	Feb	Mar	Apr	May	Jun	Jul	Aug	Sep	Oct	Nov	Dec	Year
Record high °C (°F)	18.0 (64.4)	17.5 (63.5)	24.5 (76.1)	27.5 (81.5)	33.5 (92.3)	34.0 (93.2)	34.5 (94.1)	36.0 (96.8)	33.5 (92.3)	27.0 (80.6)	23.0 (73.4)	18.5 (65.3)	36.0 (96.8)
Mean daily maximum °C (°F)	−1.2 (29.8)	−0.2 (31.6)	3.7 (38.7)	9.9 (49.8)	17.0 (62.6)	22.2 (72.0)	25.6 (78.1)	25.1 (77.2)	20.5 (68.9)	13.9 (57.0)	7.8 (46.0)	2.0 (35.6)	12.2 (54.0)
Daily mean °C (°F)	−5.6 (21.9)	−4.9 (23.2)	−0.6 (30.9)	5.2 (41.4)	11.1 (52.0)	16.2 (61.2)	19.6 (67.3)	19.1 (66.4)	14.9 (58.8)	9.0 (48.2)	4.0 (39.2)	−2.0 (28.4)	7.1 (44.8)
Mean daily minimum °C (°F)	−10.1 (13.8)	−9.5 (14.9)	−5.4 (22.3)	0.3 (32.5)	5.3 (41.5)	10.1 (50.2)	13.6 (56.5)	13.1 (55.6)	9.2 (48.6)	4.1 (39.4)	0.1 (32.2)	−5.9 (21.4)	2.1 (35.8)
Record low °C (°F)	−31.0 (−23.8)	−35.5 (−31.9)	−26.0 (−14.8)	−14.5 (5.9)	−5.5 (22.1)	−0.5 (31.1)	3.5 (38.3)	1.0 (33.8)	−4.0 (24.8)	−8.0 (17.6)	−17.0 (1.4)	−26.5 (−15.7)	−35.5 (−31.9)
Average precipitation mm (inches)	111.0 (4.37)	86.6 (3.41)	103.8 (4.09)	92.7 (3.65)	98.0 (3.86)	76.6 (3.02)	77.6 (3.06)	75.2 (2.96)	102.0 (4.02)	109.3 (4.30)	119.1 (4.69)	114.2 (4.50)	1,166 (45.91)
Average rainfall mm (inches)	46.3 (1.82)	43.0 (1.69)	67.4 (2.65)	80.2 (3.16)	97.3 (3.83)	76.6 (3.02)	77.6 (3.06)	75.2 (2.96)	102.0 (4.02)	109.3 (4.30)	105.6 (4.16)	66.6 (2.62)	947.0 (37.28)
Average snowfall cm (inches)	64.7 (25.5)	43.6 (17.2)	36.4 (14.3)	12.5 (4.9)	0.7 (0.3)	0.0 (0.0)	0.0 (0.0)	0.0 (0.0)	0.0 (0.0)	0.0 (0.0)	13.5 (5.3)	47.6 (18.7)	219.0 (86.2)
Source: Environment Canada
