= Garland, Nova Scotia =

Community in Nova Scotia, Canada

Coordinates: 45°5′58.92″N 64°45′54.33″W

Garland in Nova Scotia

Garland is a community in the Canadian province of Nova Scotia, located in Kings County.
