= Factorydale, Nova Scotia =

Community in Nova Scotia, Canada

Coordinates: 44°59′56.98″N 64°47′6.63″W

Factorydale in Nova Scotia

Factorydale is a community in the Canadian province of Nova Scotia, located in Kings County. It is the site of small hydroelectric dam operated by the nearby town of Berwick. Factorydale is a very scenic area that runs 10 km long and 5 km wide and is surrounded by Morristown, Berwick West and Nicholsville. The main attraction of Fractorydale was the pond, that is where most industries started up and it was a beautiful place to spend time. The big tall colourful maple trees lining the main pond in the autumn made for a beautiful walk and during the winter the pond would freeze over to create a fantastic skating rink that the whole community shared. Factorydale was named because of the number of factories surrounding the ravine of the south river, it was the main business spot until Morristown (their neighbour community) established themselves. Factorydale was well known for their apple production, it is where Canada's first orchard club was established in 1948 and there were already 35 apple farms established before World War II. The club taught young individuals proper grafting, thinning and pruning techniques. Factorydale was a wealthy area because of their apple production, trees were planted in every open available space even if it was on someones front lawn. Apples were the first main agricultural establishment in Factorydale however there were many to follow including; hogs, blueberries, raspberries, pullet, egg, cheese and even Christmas trees. Factorydale turned into a tourist attraction for families all around Nova Scotia.
