= Ross Creek, Nova Scotia =

Community in Nova Scotia, Canada

Coordinates: 45.2448°N 64.4557°W

Ross Creek, Nova Scotia is a community in Kings County, Nova Scotia, Canada.
