= Halls Harbour =

Community in Nova Scotia, Canada

Coordinates: 45°12′3″N 64°37′8″W

Halls Harbour in Nova Scotia

Halls Harbour is a fishing community in the Canadian province of Nova Scotia, located in Kings County on the North Mountain along the shore of the Bay of Fundy.

== History ==
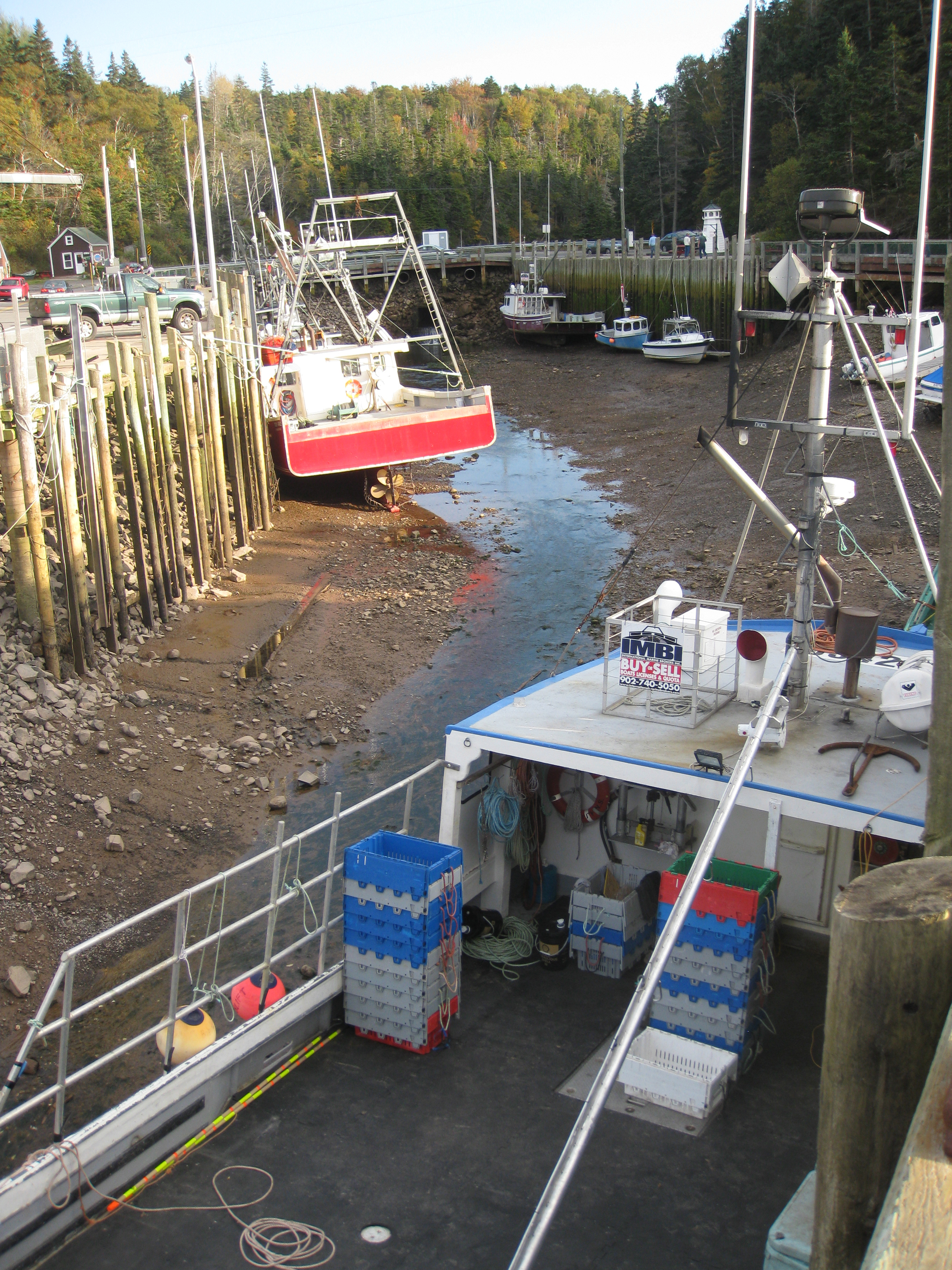
Halls Harbour

Halls Harbour is believed to be named after Samuel Hall, an American privateer in the American Revolution who used the cove to raid settlements in the Annapolis Valley but was forced to flee and abandon his ship in the harbour by pursuing militia in 1779. Various legends grew up about the privateer raid, attracting treasure hunters who are said to have left abandoned pits deep in the woods surrounding the harbour. The harbour was first settled in 1826 by the Bucknam and Parker families who crossed the Bay from New Brunswick. A lumber mill soon went into operation, followed by a store established in 1830 by the Whitney family. A school was started in 1831. The first wharf was built in 1836 and the community quickly grew around the sheltered tidal harbour which served to export timber and agricultural products from the Annapolis Valley. Farms developed along the road the Valley which became an associated community of East Halls Harbour.

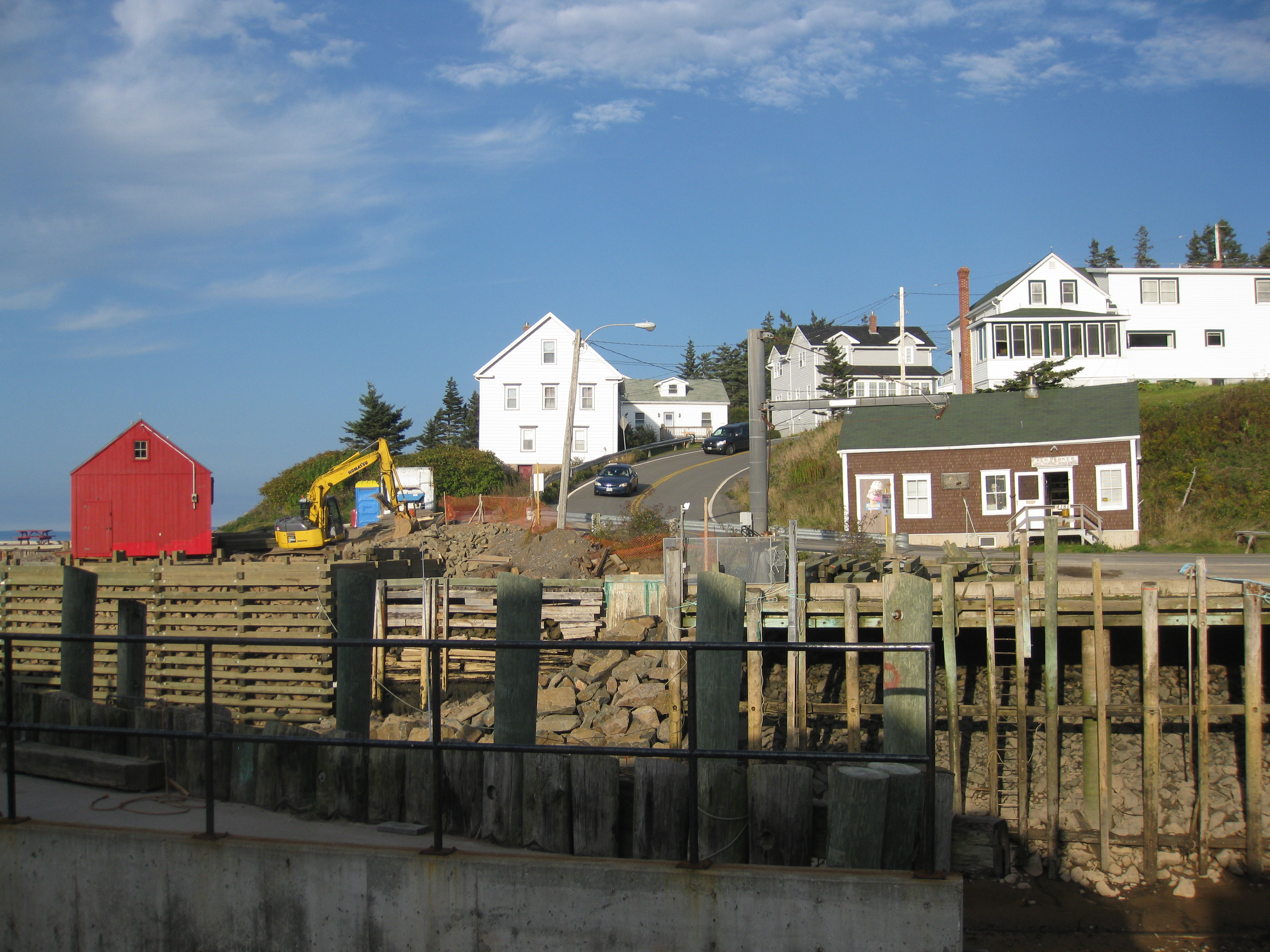
Road into village and Parker's Store

A shipyard produced many schooners and some square rigged vessels, the largest being the barque Jenny Bertaux, built in 1864. A notable early resident was Ransford Dodsworth Bucknam, a local mariner whose 19th century career took him all over the world including a post as an admiral in the Turkish Navy. Growth of the village slowed in the 1870s as the depletion of timber reserves ended the lumber trade and the arrival in 1869 of the Windsor and Annapolis Railway in the Annapolis Valley and drew away agricultural shipments. Shipbuilding declined with the lack of timber and introduction of steamships although there was a brief revival in World War I. The harbour continued as an inshore fishing port and small coastal shipping centre for coastal schooners and small steamers. The Canadian federal government took over operation of the wharves in the early 1900s and built a lighthouse on a small breakwater at the eastern harbour entrance in 1911. The larger western breakwater was extended in 1920 and heavily damaged by a storm in 1962. After World War II, coastal shipping ceased but the picturesque harbour drew many local cottagers and became a favoured place to view the dramatic change of the Bay of Fundy tides.

== Economy ==
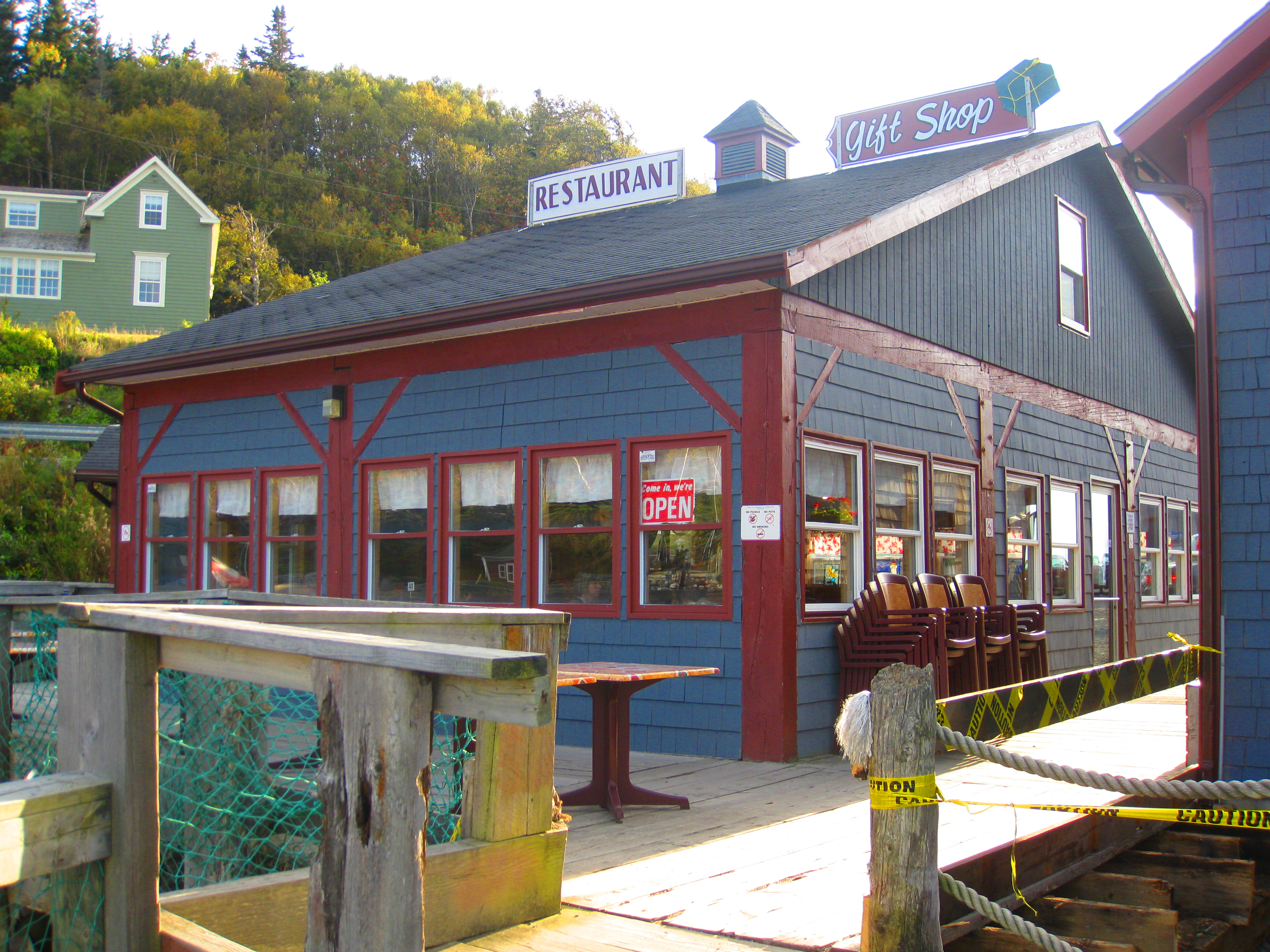
Halls Harbour restaurant

Fishing remains the main year round industry with several commercial lobster and scallop boats operating from the wharves in addition to a large lobster pound. The Harbour Authority of Halls Harbour took control of the harbour from the Canadian Department of Fisheries and Oceans in 1996. The West Breakwater, severely damaged by a storm in 1997 was rebuilt in stages and completed in 2003. The other main industry is tourism. A seafood restaurant and souvenir shop was built with the lobster pound in the 1990s. The community has developed walking trails and small museum. A seasonal store operates beside the wharf. In summer, floating wharves provide mooring for recreational vessels, many of which are owned by summer residents who seasonally swell the village population. Several bed and breakfast operations cater to tourists and the village is home to several artist studios including David Lacey and the noted marine artist, printmaker and boatbuilder John Neville.

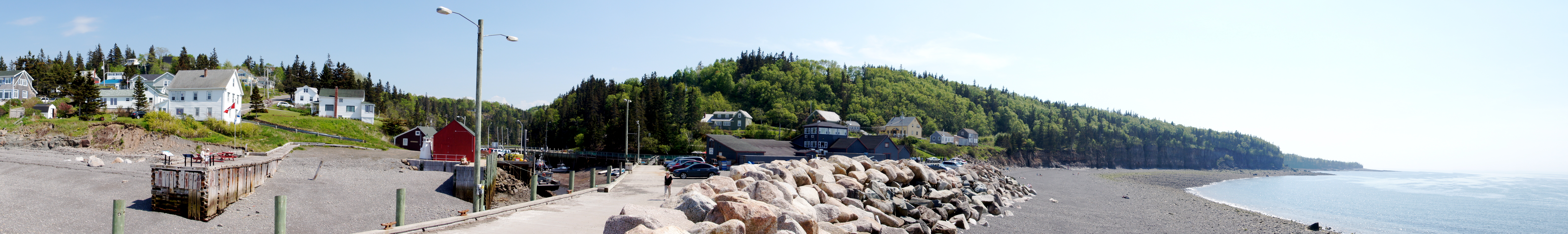
Halls Harbour's dramatic breakwater. The Bay of Fundy at low tide.

== Notable residents ==
- Ransford D. Bucknam, namesake of Bucknam Park
