= Berwick, Nova Scotia =

Town in Nova Scotia, Canada

Berwick
- Town
- Town of Berwick
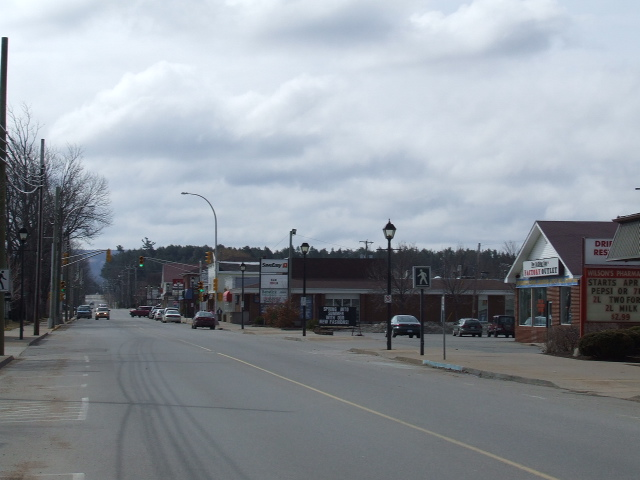
- Berwick's commercial street

- Flag
- Nickname: Apple Capital of Nova Scotia
- Motto: By Industry and Ingenuity
- Location of Berwick, Nova Scotia
- Coordinates: 45°2′N 64°44′W
- Country: Canada
- Province: Nova Scotia
- County: Kings County
- Founded: 1800s
- Incorporated: May 25, 1923
- Electoral Districts Federal: West Nova
- Provincial: Kings West

Government
  - Mayor: Mike Trinacty
  - Governing Body: Council of the Town of Berwick
  - MLA: Chris Palmer (PC)
  - MP: Chris d'Entremont (L)

Area (2021)
  - Total: 6.53 km^{2} (2.52 sq mi)
- Elevation: 43 m (141 ft)

Population (2021)
  - Total: 2,455
  - Density: 375.8/km^{2} (973/sq mi)
- Time zone: UTC-4 (AST)
- Postal code: B0P
- Area code: 902
- Telephone Exchange: 538
- Median Earnings*: CA$60,400
- NTS Map: 021H02
- GNBC Code: CACVC
- Website: Town of Berwick
- Median household income, 2020 (all households)

Berwick is a Canadian town in Kings County, Nova Scotia. The town is located in the eastern part of the Annapolis Valley on the Cornwallis River. The town site stretches south from the river and Exit 15 of Highway 101 to Highway 1. Berwick occupies 6.53 km^{2} (2.6 sq mi) and has an elevation of 43 m (141 ft) above sea level.

== History ==
As the headwaters of the Cornwallis River, Berwick was used by Nova Scotia's Mi'kmaq people and later Acadians as a crossing place between the Cornwallis and the Annapolis River which rises to the west. Acadians built a rough road between the two rivers just to the south of the town, a route which after British settlement became The Post Road or Highway No. 1 the main road connecting western communities in Nova Scotia.

The Berwick area was granted to several New England Planter families in 1760 but the community was not settled until 1810 when Benjamin Congdon built on the townsite. It was known progressively as the "Congdon Settlement", "Curry's Corner", and "Davison's Corner" after various prominent families and storekeepers. Residents decided in 1851 to name it Berwick after the English town of Berwick-upon-Tweed.

A peat moss bog just west of the village was named Caribou Bog and provided one of the last stands for Woodland caribou in mainland Nova Scotia, before their extirpation by 1905. As late as 1887, a herd of caribou was seen crossing through the centre of the town.

Berwick became a station on the Windsor and Annapolis Railway in 1869. The railway radically transformed the town, moving the centre of business a mile south away from the original Main Street by the Cornwallis River with the town centre organized along Commercial Street which led to the businesses which grew around the tracks. The railway, which became known as the Dominion Atlantic Railway in 1894, created a large export market for apples which attracted warehouses and spin-off industries to Berwick. Berwick had rail service until the Dominion Atlantic Railway abandoned the former W&AR main line through town in March 1990.

Berwick was incorporated as a town on May 25, 1923. It built its own hydro electric power dam in 1921 which is still owned and operated by the town. Its capacity is 520 kVa.

== Demographics ==
Historical population
Year	Pop.	±%
1941	962	—
1951	1,045	+8.6%
1956	1,134	+8.5%
1961	1,282	+13.1%
1981	1,699	+32.5%
1986	2,058	+21.1%
1991	2,150	+4.5%
1996	2,195	+2.1%
2001	2,282	+4.0%
2006	2,454	+7.5%
2011	2,454	+0.0%
2016	2,509	+2.2%
2021	2,455	−2.2%

In the 2021 Census of Population conducted by Statistics Canada, Berwick had a population of 2,455 living in 1,044 of its 1,080 total private dwellings, a change of −2.2% from its 2016 population of 2,509. With a land area of 6.53 km^{2} (2.52 sq mi), it had a population density of 376.0/km^{2} (973.7/sq mi) in 2021.

== Economy ==
Berwick's official slogan is the "Apple Capital of Nova Scotia", honouring the importance of the apple industry as a major economic force in developing the town. Following the collapse of the traditional European market for apples during and after World War II, area farmers began diversifying their operations throughout the 1950s and 1960s. Despite the decline of the apple industry since the 1950s, there are still some apple orchards to be found in the surrounding agricultural districts. A large apple sculpture is found in the centre of town to commemorate the importance of this historic industry.

Until recently a number of regionally successful small manufacturers related to agriculture prospered in Berwick, including the M.W. Graves food processing plant, the Berwick Fruit Co-op, Graham's Meat Market, Berwick Bakery and Larsen's Meats. However centralization of Canada's food industry led each firm to be bought out and eventually closed by the late 1990s. Losses included the Avon Foods (the former Graves Plant) which closed in March 2005 and the Larsen's pork processing plant, which closed in April 2011. Other employers include the Easson's trucking firm, the Michelin tire plant in nearby Waterville and the military base at CFB Greenwood. The town functions as a service centre for adjacent areas of Kings County with a number of small retailers.

The town has an independent electrical utility, the Berwick Electric Commission. The BEC generates 10–15 per cent of its own needs from a hydro generator in Factorydale, purchasing the balance from Nova Scotia Power. In 2015, the Berwick Electric Utility combined with electrical utilities in Mahone Bay and Antigonish to build four-turbine wind farm in Ellershouse, Nova Scotia. The new wind farm known as the Alternative Energy Resource Authority supplies 20% of Berwick's electricity. Berwick has a 4.8 MW Solar Garden, built in 2023.

== Buildings and structures ==
Berwick's late 19th and early 20th century prosperity driven by the apple industry left the town with many fine homes and classic wooden Victorian storefronts. However most of the historic commercial buildings on Berwick's main thoroughfare of Commercial Street were demolished in the 1980s and 1990s by commercial expansion of Berwick businesses seeking to compete with such retail centres as New Minas by building large parking lots. Berwick's town centre resembles a typical North American retail strip with low strip malls and expanses of asphalt.

The town still retains many fine Victorian and Edwardian houses on tree-lined streets. However some of these homes now face demolition. The Bethune House, an Arts and Crafts style home of a noted early 20th century regional photographer was demolished in 2008 to create a parking lot. In 2009 two of Berwick's most historic homes, the Patterson and Keith houses, were proposed for demolition to provide a driveway for a duplex housing development. The proposed demolitions led to a protest by citizens concerned about the economic and cultural loss of attractive heritage properties and the lack of any heritage planning in Berwick, which is one of the only municipalities in Nova Scotia which lacks a policy to develop or preserve heritage buildings. Both buildings have since been demolished.

A large new fire hall was constructed in 2008 for the Berwick Volunteer Fire Department. In 2009, construction plans were announced for a large new arena, recreation and community centre nicknamed "The Apple Dome". The building has been officially named the "Kings Mutual Century Centre". The arena includes a 200-metre running track, the Berwick Fitness Centre, and an ice rink that are partially lit with natural light. The Berwick Curling Club has since been added to the KMCC in 2018.

== Literary connections ==
Margaret Marshall Saunders, author of the 1894 children's book, Beautiful Joe spent most of her childhood in Berwick where her father served as Baptist minister. Christy Ann Conlin, author of the 2002 novel Heave grew up just outside Berwick and critics have noted that the fictional town of "Foster" in her book was inspired by Berwick.

== Present day ==
Berwick operates a museum (the Apple Capital Museum) and a seasonal tourism bureau. A branch of the Annapolis Valley Regional Library, with public Internet access, is located in the town hall. Berwick has been home since the 1860s to a summer religious retreat operated by the United Church of Canada known as Berwick Camp, located in a picturesque grove of old-growth pines and hemlock trees at the south end of the town.

A homeless man named Harley Lawrence was found dead in a burned-out bus shelter in Berwick in October 2013. Two Berwick men were charged with his murder in April 2014 and pleaded guilty to second-degree murder charges in February 2015.

== Notable residents ==
- Edward D. MacArthur (1920–1986), politician and doctor.
- Margaret Marshall Saunders – international best-selling author

== See also ==
- List of municipalities in Nova Scotia
