= Nicholsville, Nova Scotia =

Community in Nova Scotia, Canada

Coordinates: 44°58′46.83″N 64°48′21.72″W

Nicholsville in Nova Scotia

Nicholsville is a community in the Canadian province of Nova Scotia, located in Kings County.
