= Somerset, Kings County, Nova Scotia =

Community in Nova Scotia, Canada

Coordinates: 45°4′26″N 64°44′55″W

Somerset in Nova Scotia

Somerset is a rural community in the Canadian province of Nova Scotia, located in Kings County.

Boardman Robinson (1876–1952) a well-known Canadian-American artist, illustrator and cartoonist of the early 20th century, was born in Somerset.

Pleasant Valley Cemetery in Somerset is the final resting place of Alfred C. Fuller, founder of the Fuller Brush Company.
