= Canada Creek Ranch, Michigan =

- Census-designated place (CDP) & unincorporated community
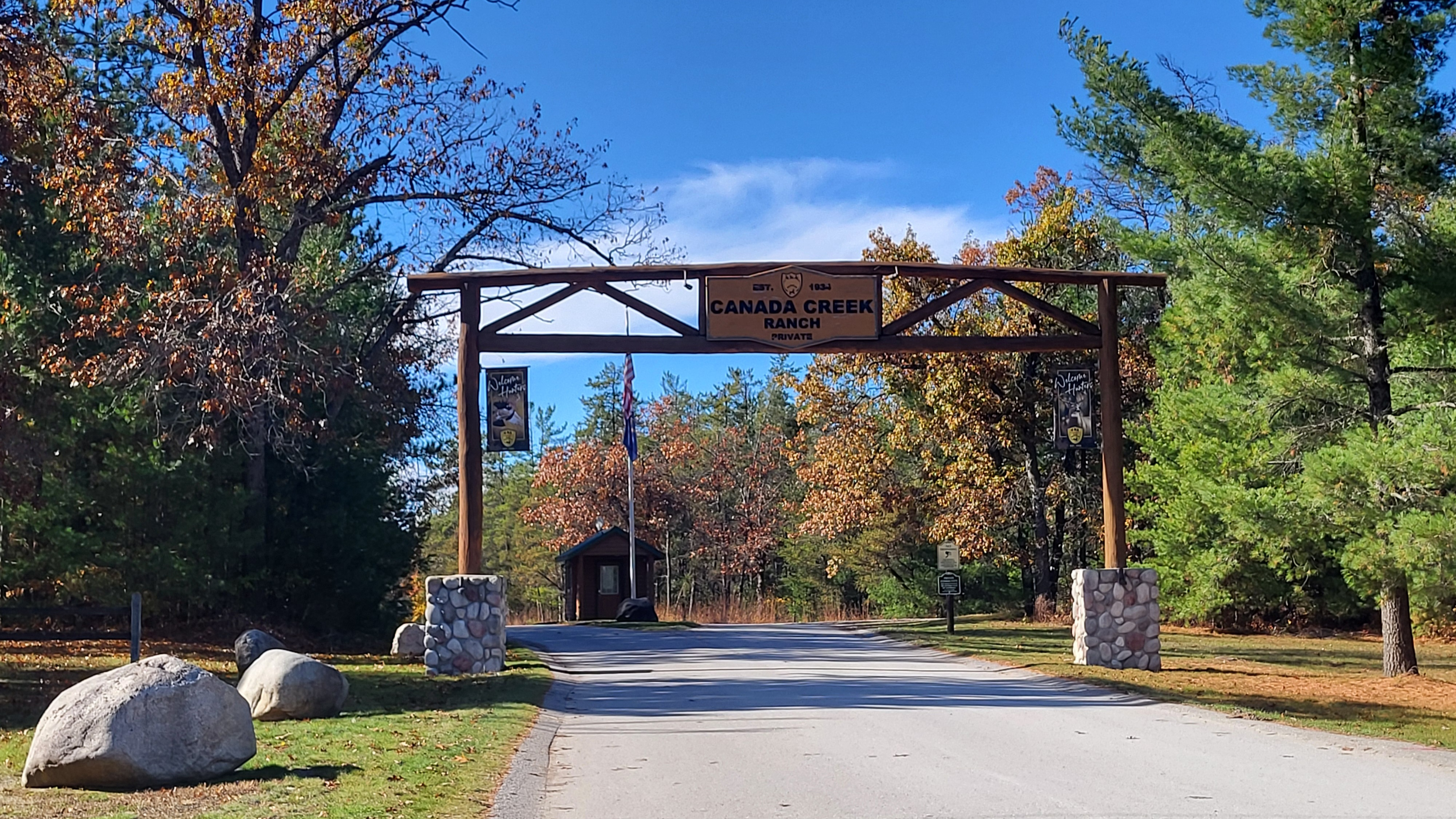
- Entrance along Ranch House Trail near M-33

- Location within Montmorency County

- Location within the state of Michigan Location within the United States
- Coordinates: 45°10′19″N 84°12′29″W
- Country: United States
- State: Michigan
- County: Montmorency
- Township: Montmorency
- Established: 1934

Area
  - Total: 2.47 sq mi (6.39 km^{2})
  - Land: 2.23 sq mi (5.78 km^{2})
  - Water: 0.24 sq mi (0.61 km^{2})
- Elevation: 820 ft (250 m)

Population (2020)
  - Total: 258
  - Density: 115.69/sq mi (44.67/km^{2})
- Time zone: UTC-5 (Eastern (EST))
  - Summer (DST): UTC-4 (EDT)
- ZIP code(s): 49709 (Atlanta)
- FIPS code: 26-12980
- GNIS feature ID: 1852241

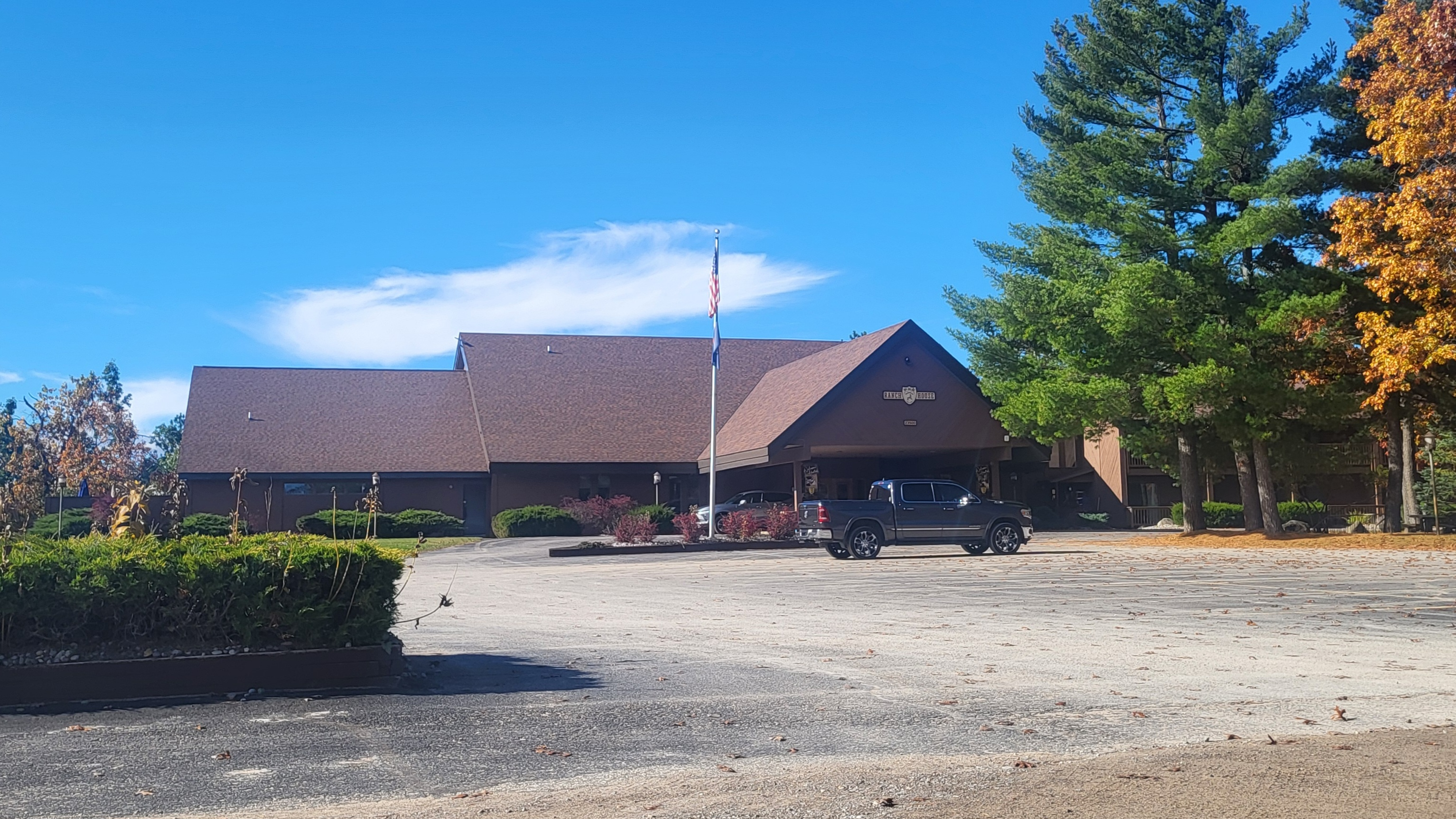
Canada Creek Ranch clubhouse

Canada Creek Ranch is an unincorporated community in Montmorency Township, Montmorency County, in the U.S. state of Michigan. It is a census-designated place (CDP) used for statistical purposes. The population was 258 at the 2020 census, down from 304 in 2010.

== Geography ==
The community is in northern Montmorency County, 13 miles (21 km) north of Atlanta, the county seat. It is bordered to the east by Mackinaw State Forest. State highway M-33 passes to the east of the community, leading south to Atlanta and north 14 miles (23 km) to Onaway.

According to the U.S. Census Bureau, the CDP has a total area of 2.5 square miles (6.5 km^{2}), of which 2.2 square miles (5.7 km^{2}) are land and 0.2 square miles (0.5 km^{2}), or 9.53%, are water. The community surrounds several natural lakes, including Lake Geneva, Wildfowl Lake, and Virginia Lake. Canada Creek runs along the western edge of the community, flowing north toward the Black River, which continues north to Lake Huron at the Straits of Mackinac.

== Demographics ==
Historical population
Census	Pop.	Note	%±
2000	405		—
2010	304		−24.9%
2020	258		−15.1%
U.S. Decennial Census

As of the census of 2000, there were 405 people, 207 households, and 144 families residing in the CDP. The population density was 52.1 inhabitants per square mile (20.1/km^{2}). There were 613 housing units at an average density of 78.8 per square mile (30.4/km^{2}). The racial makeup of the CDP was 99.01% White, and 0.99% from two or more races. Hispanic or Latino of any race were 0.25% of the population.

There were 207 households, out of which 10.6% had children under the age of 18 living with them, 65.7% were married couples living together, 2.9% had a female householder with no husband present, and 30.4% were non-families. 28.0% of all households were made up of individuals, and 20.3% had someone living alone who was 65 years of age or older. The average household size was 1.96 and the average family size was 2.33.

In the CDP, the population was spread out, with 11.6% under the age of 18, 0.7% from 18 to 24, 9.4% from 25 to 44, 35.8% from 45 to 64, and 42.5% who were 65 years of age or older. The median age was 62 years. For every 100 females, there were 89.3 males. For every 100 females age 18 and over, there were 89.4 males.

The median income for a household in the CDP was $32,857, and the median income for a family was $37,500. Males had a median income of $28,750 versus $21,250 for females. The per capita income for the CDP was $20,227. About 2.8% of families and 2.6% of the population were below the poverty line, including none of those under age 18 and 5.6% of those age 65 or over.
