= Morristown, Kings County, Nova Scotia =

Community in Nova Scotia, Canada

Coordinates: 44°59′7″N 64°46′10″W

Morristown in Nova Scotia

Morristown is a community in the Canadian province of Nova Scotia, located in Kings County.
