= Canada Creek, Nova Scotia =

Community in Nova Scotia, Canada

Coordinates: 45°10′13.08″N 64°44′44.5″W

Canada Creek in Nova Scotia

Canada Creek is a community in the Canadian province of Nova Scotia, located in Kings County.
