= Waterville, Nova Scotia =

Community in Nova Scotia, Canada

Waterville, Kings County
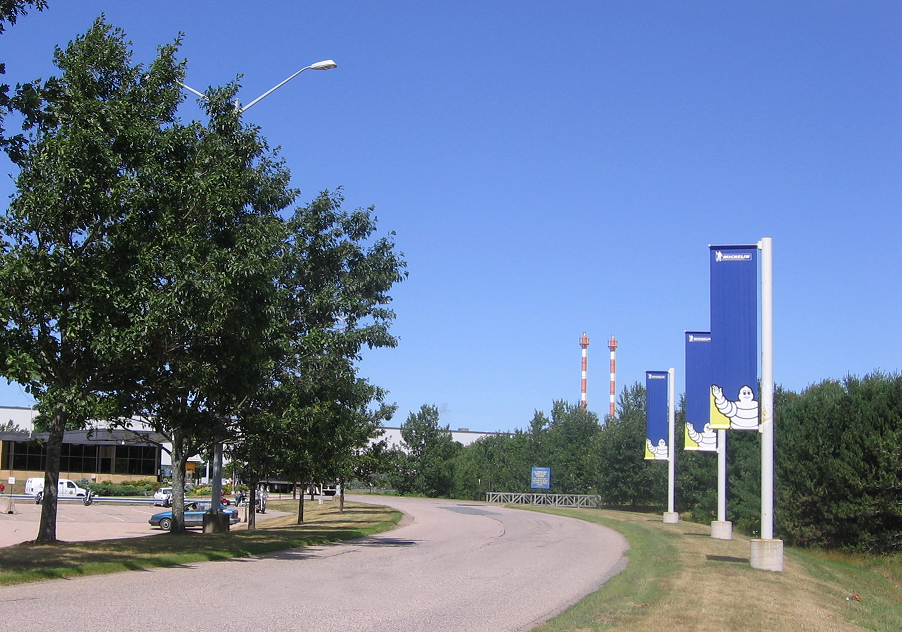
- Michelin plant in Waterville, Nova Scotia

- Location of Waterville in Nova Scotia
- Coordinates: 45°3′N 64°40′W
- Country: Canada
- Province: Nova Scotia
- County: Kings
- Elevation: 28 m (92 ft)

Waterville is a Canadian community in Kings County, Nova Scotia. It is administratively part of the village of Cornwallis Square.

Located on the Cornwallis River, the community is located 15 kilometres west of Kentville and is home to a Michelin tire factory, as well as the Nova Scotia Youth Centre.

As of 2021, the population was 703.

== Climate ==
Climate data for Waterville
Month	Jan	Feb	Mar	Apr	May	Jun	Jul	Aug	Sep	Oct	Nov	Dec	Year
Record high °C (°F)	18 (64)	17.5 (63.5)	24.5 (76.1)	27.5 (81.5)	33.5 (92.3)	34 (93)	34.5 (94.1)	36 (97)	33.5 (92.3)	27 (81)	23 (73)	18.5 (65.3)	36 (97)
Mean daily maximum °C (°F)	−1.2 (29.8)	−0.2 (31.6)	3.7 (38.7)	9.9 (49.8)	17.0 (62.6)	22.2 (72.0)	25.6 (78.1)	25.1 (77.2)	20.5 (68.9)	13.9 (57.0)	7.8 (46.0)	2 (36)	12.2 (54.0)
Mean daily minimum °C (°F)	−10.1 (13.8)	−9.5 (14.9)	−5.4 (22.3)	0.3 (32.5)	5.3 (41.5)	10.1 (50.2)	13.6 (56.5)	13.1 (55.6)	9.2 (48.6)	4.1 (39.4)	0.1 (32.2)	−5.9 (21.4)	2.1 (35.8)
Record low °C (°F)	−31 (−24)	−35.5 (−31.9)	−26 (−15)	−14.5 (5.9)	−5.5 (22.1)	−0.5 (31.1)	3.5 (38.3)	1 (34)	−4 (25)	−8 (18)	−17 (1)	−26.5 (−15.7)	−35.5 (−31.9)
Average precipitation mm (inches)	111.7 (4.40)	86.6 (3.41)	103.8 (4.09)	92.7 (3.65)	98 (3.9)	76.6 (3.02)	77.6 (3.06)	75.2 (2.96)	102 (4.0)	109.3 (4.30)	119.1 (4.69)	114.2 (4.50)	1,166 (45.9)
Source: Environment Canada

== Demographics ==
In the 2021 Census of Population conducted by Statistics Canada, Waterville had a population of 703 living in 314 of its 327 total private dwellings, a change of −5.9% from its 2016 population of 747. With a land area of 1.79 km^{2} (0.69 sq mi), it had a population density of 392.7/km^{2} (1,017.2/sq mi) in 2021.
