= Canard River =

Coordinates: 45°07′21.5″N 64°26′07.7″W

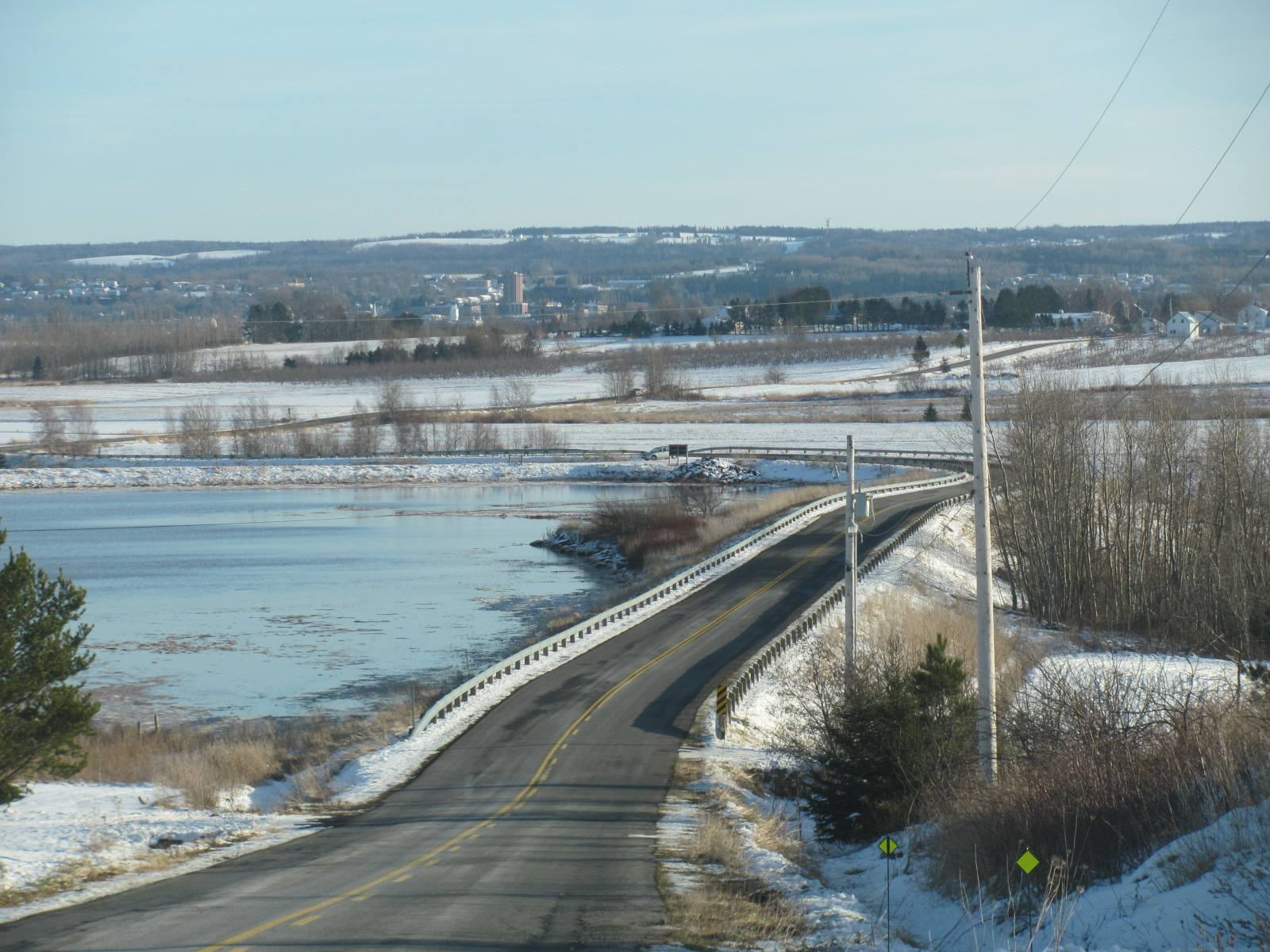

Location
- Country: Canada
- Province: Nova Scotia

Physical characteristics
- Source
  - location: Camp Aldershot
- Mouth
  - location: Minas Basin
  - elevation: sea level
- Length: 15 km (9.3 mi)

The Canard River (French: Rivière Canard) is a river in Kings County, Nova Scotia, Canada which drains into the Minas Basin of the Bay of Fundy between the communities of Canard and Starr's Point. It is known for its fertile river banks and extensive dyke land agriculture.

== Geography ==
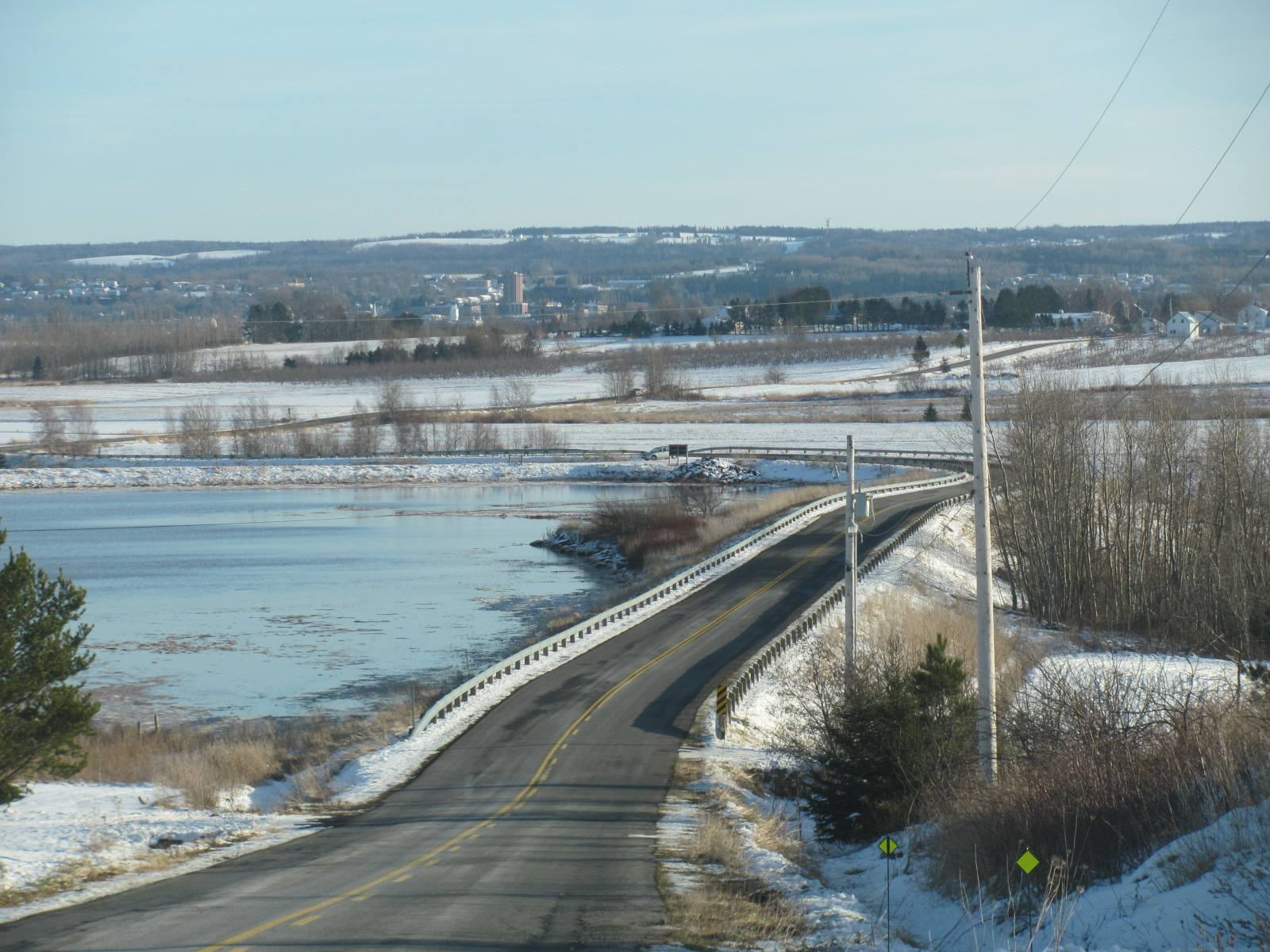
The mouth of the Canard River at high tide, where it emerges from the Wellington Dyke

The river has its source in a number of small brooks which flow from the sandy pine woods of what is now the Camp Aldershot military base, near Steam Mill Village. The Canard River has a short length of 15 km but its lower reaches are wide and deep due to the enormous tides of the Minas Basin. The river was once tidal for most of its length but a series of dykes first built in the 1600s held back the tide which is now stopped near the river's mouth by the Wellington Dyke. The upper reaches of the river are often referred to by the dykes which once spanned the river - Upper Dyke and Middle Dyke.

== History ==
The Canard river was known to the Mi'kmaq people as Apocheechumochwakade meaning "home of the black duck". The Mi'kmaq also used the mouth of the river for shad fishing.

Acadians settled along the river in the late 1600s and called it Rivière-aux-Canards after the French word for duck. They first built small dykes to claim salt water marshes for farmland at the upper reaches of the river near the communities now known as Steam Mill Village and Upper Dyke. A large cross dyke was built further down river at Middle Dyke. About 1750 an even larger cross dyke, over a mile long, was built near Port Williams. Known as the Grand Dyke it located where the current highway Route 358 crosses the river. By this date, the Acadian village on both sides of the river totaled 750 people and included the extensive dykeland farms along the river as well as several mills.

It was on this river that a parish was established in 1670 by the name of Saint-Joseph-de-la-Rivière-aux-Canards, later, Rivière-aux-Canards in short form. The best farms were located at the mouths of 'rivière aux Canards' river and the 'Saint-Antoine' river. Rivière-aux-Canards was west of Grand-Pré.

The Acadian settlement was destroyed in the 1755 Bay of Fundy Campaign of the Expulsion of the Acadians. On October 27, 1755 fourteen transport ships embarked 1,600 Acadians from the region of Grand-Pré and Rivière-aux-Canards, as well as 1,300 from Pisiguit and Cobequid. They joined up with ten other ships in the Bay of Fundy with 1,900 Acadiens from the region of Beaubassin. The ships were over crowded with standing room only. Governor Charles Lawrence had given the order from returning. It was for this reason that the villages of Grand-Pré, Pisiguit, and Rivière-aux-Canards were burnt to the ground. With no one to maintain the dykes, a severe storm in November 1759 beached the Grand Dyke and flooded up to the Middle Dyke which was badly damaged, returning hundreds of acres of farmland to tidal marshes.

The New England Planters took up the Acadian lands along the river in 1760. A government ship bringing supplies up the Canard River for the Planters, the brigantine Montague was wrecked in the lower reaches of the river in December 1760. The Planter settlement on the south bank of the river becoming known as Starr's Point and the settlement on the north becoming known as Canard. The Planters repaired the Middle Dyke and rebuilt the Grand Dyke in 1782. In 1825 they built the Wellington Dyke near the mouth of the Canard River protecting in total over 3,000 acres of farmland along the river from the tides of the Minas Basin.

== See also ==
- List of rivers of Nova Scotia
