= Canard, Nova Scotia =

Community in Nova Scotia, Canada

Coordinates: 45°7′58″N 64°26′8″W

Canard in Nova Scotia

Canard is a rural community occupying a ridge to the north of the Canard River between the Canard and Habitant Rivers in Kings County in the Canadian province of Nova Scotia. The name comes from the French word for duck which was in turn derived from the Mi'kmaw name for the river which described the large numbers of black ducks once found there.

== Geography ==
Canard Street, also known as Route 341, runs through the community following the Canard River and is bisected in the middle by Route 358 which divides the community between Upper Canard to the west and Lower Canard to the east. The corner was known by the names of Canard Corner and Hamilton Corner but is best known by locals as "Jaw Bone Corner". The name stems from a large set of whale jaw bones which were mounted at the crossroads after a whale stranded and died on the Canard River in the early 19th century.

== History ==
The community takes its name from the Canard River. Successive cultures have lived by the river and have named the settlement area by different but related names.

Where Canard Street and Highway 358 intersect is known as jawbone corner, often called this by the local residents of the area. It got its names because back before the Wellington Dyke was completed in 1885, a large whale swam up the Canard river, and became stranded on the beach as the tide went out. The jaw bones of the big whale were then placed in the yard of the house that was on the corner.

=== Apocheechumochwakade ===
Canard was known to the Mi'kmaq people as Apocheechumochwakade meaning "home of the black duck". Archaeological sites indicate that the Mi'kmaq used the river mouth for shad fishing.

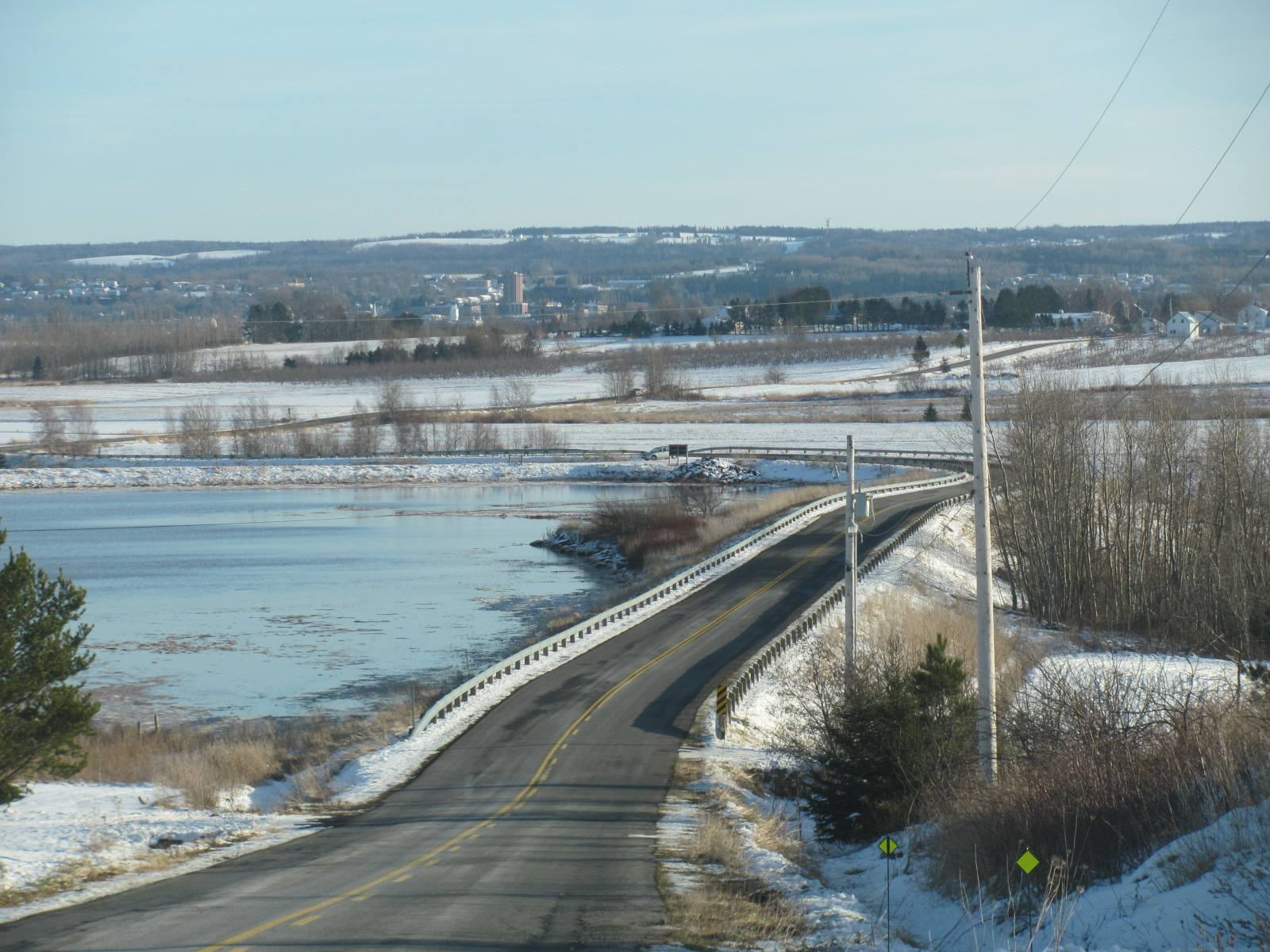
Wellington Dyke and Wellington Dyke Road, looking from Canada towards Starr's Point

=== Rivière-aux-Canards ===
Canard was an important Acadian village known as Rivière-aux-Canards whose population settled on both sides of the river beginning in the late 1600s and totaled 750 people by 1750. The Acadian settlement included extensive dyked farm lands along the river, several mills, its own parish. The Acadian settlement was destroyed in the 1755 Bay of Fundy Campaign of the Expulsion of the Acadians. A severe storm in November 1759 broke the Acadian dykes and flooded the unoccupied farmlands.

=== Canard ===
New England Planters took up the Acadian lands in 1760. They gradually repaired and expanded the old Acadian dykes. Today Canard consists mostly of large farms and several agricultural processing plants located between the village of Canning to the north and Starr's Point, Nova Scotia to the south. The federal government's Sheffield Research Farm is located in Upper Canard. Many acres of Canard farmland are protected by the Wellington Dyke, built by the Planters at the mouth of the Canard River in 1825.

The main church was the First Cornwallis Baptist Church.
