= List of shipwrecks in 1760 =

The list includes some ships sunk, wrecked or otherwise lost during 1760.

table of contents
1760
Jan	Feb	Mar	Apr
May	Jun	Jul	Aug
Sep	Oct	Nov	Dec
Unknown date

== January ==
=== 6 January ===
List of shipwrecks: 6 January 1760
Ship	State	Description
Royal Escape	Great Britain	The stores ship, a hoy, was driven ashore at Deal, Kent. Her crew were rescued. She was later refloated and taken in to Dover, Kent.

=== 12 January ===
List of shipwrecks: 12 January 1760
Ship	State	Description
Bonetta	Great Britain	The ship was sunk by ice at New York, British America.

=== 17 January ===
List of shipwrecks: 17 January 1760
Ship	State	Description
Prince Ferdinand	Great Britain	The ship was wrecked on Anegada. Her crew were rescued. She was on a voyage from Boston, Massachusetts, British America, to Jamaica.

=== Unknown date ===
List of shipwrecks: Unknown date 1760
Ship	State	Description
Adventure	Ireland	The ship was lost at New York, British America. She was on a voyage from New York to Dublin
Defiance	Great Britain	The ship foundered off the coast of Ireland. Her crew were rescued.
Enger	Great Britain	The ship was wrecked on the Portuguese coast with the loss of all but two of her crew. She was on a voyage from London to Naples, Kingdom of Sicily.
Excelle	French Navy	The warship ran aground in the Vilaine and was wrecked.
Hendriaquo	France	The ship was lost near Rye, Sussex, Great Britain. She was on a voyage from Bayonne to Bruges, Dutch Republic.
Henry	Great Britain	The ship was driven ashore and wrecked near Yarmouth, Isle of Wight. She was on a voyage from Cork to London.
Hopewell	Great Britain	The ship foundered in the Bristol Channel off Swansea, Glamorgan. She was on a voyage from Bristol, Gloucestershire, to Dartmouth, Devon.
Industry	Great Britain	The ship was lost near Dublin, Ireland, with the loss of a crew member. She was on a voyage from Liverpool, Lancashire, to an African port.
Inflexible	French Navy	The Hardi-class ship of the line ran aground and was wrecked in the Vilaine.
John Gerhard	Sweden	The ship was wrecked on the west coast of the Isle of Lewis, Great Britain, with the loss of all but three of her crew. She was on a voyage from Gothenburg to the Isle of Man.
Koornbears	Dutch Republic	The ship was driven ashore and wrecked on the coast of the Isle of Wight.
Lovely Sukey	Great Britain	The ship foundered in the Bay of Biscay. Her crew were rescued by Robert and Charles (Great Britain). She was on a voyage from London to Lisbon, Portugal.
Molly	Great Britain	The ship sank in the Delaware River, British America.
Newry	Ireland	The ship foundered in the Atlantic Ocean. Her crew were rescued by Lord How (Great Britain). She was on a voyage from Waterford to New York.
Neptune	Great Britain	The ship foundered in the Atlantic Ocean 40 leagues (120 nautical miles (220 km)) off Cape Clear Island, County Cork, Ireland. Six of her crew were rescued by a Spanish ship. She was on a voyage from "Cromorgan" to London.
Nossa Senhora do Monte do Carmo	Portugal	The ship was lost at Peniche. She was on a voyage from Cork, Ireland, to Lisbon.
Sally	Great Britain	The ship was lost near St Ann's Head, Pembrokeshire. Her crew were rescued. She was on a voyage from Jamaica to London.
Sally & Jenny	Ireland	The ship foundered in Bantry Bay. She was on a voyage from Philadelphia, Pennsylvania, British America, to Cork.
Seahorse	Great Britain	The ship was lost near Danzig. She was on a voyage from Libava, Duchy of Courland and Semigallia to Roscoff, France.
Speedwell	Great Britain	The ship was driven ashore and wrecked at Newport Pratt, County Mayo, Ireland.
Spy	Great Britain	The ship was lost at "Bonnin". Her crew were rescued.
Three Brothers	Great Britain	The ship foundered in the Atlantic Ocean off Cape Fear, North Carolina, with some loss of life. She was on a voyage from Cape Fear to Bristol.
Vries Van Leeuwarden	Dutch Republic	The galiot hoy was driven ashore and wrecked on the coast of the Isle of Wight. She was on a voyage from Bordeaux, France, to Amsterdam.

== February ==
=== 10 February ===
List of shipwrecks: 10 February 1760
Ship	State	Description
Deliverance	Great Britain	The ship foundered off the Îles des Saintes. Her crew were rescued. She was on a voyage from Virginia, British America, to London.

=== 15 February ===
List of shipwrecks: 15 February 1760
Ship	State	Description
HMS Ramillies	(Kingdom of Great Britain) Royal Navy	The second rate ship of the line was wrecked at Bolt Head, Devon, with the loss of 829 of her 850 crew.
Resolution	Great Britain	The victualling ship foundered with the loss of all but one of her crew.

=== 17 February ===
List of shipwrecks: 17 February 1760
Ship	State	Description
Nancy	Great Britain	The ship was driven ashore and wrecked 5 nautical miles (9.3 km) east of Dunkirk, France, with the loss of a crew member. She was on a voyage from London to Poole, Dorset.

=== Unknown date ===
List of shipwrecks: Unknown date 1760
Ship	State	Description
Adventure	Great Britain	The ship was driven ashore near Faro, Portugal. She was on a voyage from Newfoundland, British America, to Cádiz, Spain.
Anne	Ireland	The ship wasecked on the south west coast of Ireland. She was on a voyage from Lisbon, Portugal, to Dublin.
Anne	Great Britain	The ship foundered in the Atlantic Ocean 30 leagues (90 nautical miles (170 km)) west of The Lizard, Cornwall. Her crew were rescued by HMS Fowey ( (Kingdom of Great Britain) Royal Navy). She was on a voyage from Exeter, Devon, to Porto, Portugal.
Bee	Great Britain	The ship was driven ashore at Teignmouth, Devon. She was on a voyage from Lisbon to Topsham, Devon. Bee was later refloated.
Brave	Great Britain	The ship was lost off Cape Málaga, Spain.
Britannia	Great Britain	The ship foundered in the Bristol Channel off Northam, Devon, with the loss of all but three of her crew. She was on a voyage from New York, British America, to Bristol, Gloucestershire.
Cæsar	Great Britain	The ship was wrecked near Plymouth, Devon. She was on a voyage from Liverpool, Lancashire, to Teignmouth.
Dorothea	France	The ship was driven ashore near Portland, Dorset, Great Britain. Her crew were rescued. She was on a voyage from Bordeaux to "Frederickshall".
Eagle	Great Britain	The frigate sank in the Thames Estuary. She was on a voyage from Bristol to London.
Edward	Great Britain	The ship was driven ashore on St Nicholas Island, Plymouth. She was on a voyage from New York to London.
Eliza	Great Britain	The ship was driven ashore and wrecked near Beerhaven, Ireland. She was on a voyage from London to Limerick.
Fanny	Great Britain	The ship was driven ashore and wrecked at Portland, Dorset, with the loss of all but five of her crew. She was on a voyage from London to Senegal.
George	Great Britain	The ship sank at Ilfracombe, Devon. She was on a voyage from Jamaica to London.
Good Success	Great Britain	The ship foundered in the Atlantic Ocean off Padstow, Cornwall. Her crew were rescued. She was on a voyage from Swansea, Glamorgan, to Penzance, Cornwall.
Happy Jennet	Great Britain	The ship was driven ashore near Portland, Dorset. Her crew were rescued. She was on a voyage from Lisbon to a Scottish port.
Hermione	Great Britain	The ship was driven ashore in the River Thames at Woolwich, Kent. She was on a voyage from Plymouth to London.
Jufro Anna-Maria	Hamburg	The ship was driven ashore and wrecked at Brighthelmstone, Sussex. She was on a voyage from the Charente to Hamburg.
Katherine	Great Britain	The ship was lost in the Scottish Highlands. She was n a voyage from Boston to the Clyde.
Morant	Great Britain	The ship was wrecked on the Goodwin Sands. Her crew were rescued. She was on a voyage from London to Jamaica.
Paschal	Spain	The ship was wrecked on the French coast with the loss of all hands. She was on a voyage from Bilbao to Jersey, Channel Islands.
Pearl	Great Britain	The ship was lost in St Ives Bay.
Peggy	Great Britain	The ship was driven ashore in Bigbury Bay. She was on a voyage from Málaga, Spain, to Leith, Lothian.
Peggy & Elizabeth	Great Britain	The ship was driven into another vessel and sank at Fowey, Cornwall.
Philadelphia	Great Britain	The ship ran aground in the River Thames. She was n a voyage from London to Philadelphia, Pennsylvania, British America.
Pretty	Ireland	The ship struck a rock and sank off Wexford. Her crew were rescued. She was on a voyage from Newry, County Antrim, to Barbados.
Ranger	Great Britain	The ship was driven ashore and wrecked in the Cattewater. She was on a voyage from London to Saint Kitts.
Rebecca	Ireland	The ship was driven ashore and wrecked between Portaferry, County Down and Drogheda, County Louth. She was on a voyage from Dublin to Fyall, Azores, Portugal.
Rochester	Great Britain	The ship was driven ashore and wrecked 12 nautical miles (22 km) east of Plymouth. She was on a voyage from London to Lisbon.
Two Arthurs	Great Britain	The ship was driven ashore at Ramsgate, Kent. She was on a voyage from London to Waterford, Ireland.

== March ==
=== 2 March ===
List of shipwrecks: 2 March 1760
Ship	State	Description
HMS Tartar's Prize	(Kingdom of Great Britain) Royal Navy	The sixth rate sprang a leak and foundered in the Mediterranean Sea off Sardinia. Her crew were rescued by a Danish vessel.

=== Unknown date ===
List of shipwrecks: Unknown date 1760
Ship	State	Description
Barbara	Great Britain	The ship was driven ashore at Margate, Kent. She was on a voyage from Málaga, Spain, to London.
Diligence	Great Britain	The ship was driven ashore and wrecked on the Dutch coast.
Elizabeth	Great Britain	The ship was driven ashore and wrecked on the south coast of the Isle of Wight. She was on a voyage from Porto, Portugal, to Portsmouth, Hampshire.
Hannah	Ireland	The ship ran aground in the River Liffey and was severely damaged. She was on a voyage from Philadelphia, Pennsylvania, British America, to Dublin.
Hellen	Great Britain	The ship was run down and sunk at the Nore by Freedom (Great Britain). Her crew were rescued. She was on a voyage from London to Banff, Aberdeenshire.
John	Great Britain	The ship was wrecked on the Scottish coast with the loss of all hands. She was on a voyage from Dublin to Glasgow, Renfrewshire.
Portsmouth Merchant	Great Britain	The ship foundered in the Bristol Channel off The Mumbles, Glamorgan. Her crew were rescued. She was on a voyage from London to Bristol, Gloucestershire.
Prince Edward	Great Britain	The ship was lost at Pool, Dorset. She was on a voyage from Southampton, Hampshire, to Swanage, Dorset and Chatham, Kent.
Santissima Trinidad	Spain	The ship was wrecked on the Portuguese coast. She was on a voyage from Seville to London.
Stafford	Great Britain	The ship sank in the River Thames at Woolwich, Kent. She was on a voyage from Hull, Yorkshire, to London.

== April ==
=== 1 April ===
List of shipwrecks: 1 April 1760
Ship	State	Description
Denham	British East India Company	The East Indiaman was set afire at Bengkulu, Sumatra, Netherlands East Indies, to prevent her capture by the French.

=== Unknown date ===
List of shipwrecks: Unknown date 1760
Ship	State	Description
Expedition	Great Britain	The ship was destroyed by fire at Barcelona, Spain.
Friends Goodwill	Great Britain	The ship collided with the pier at Dover, Kent, and sank. She was on a voyage from London to Portsmouth, Hampshire.
Hope	Great Britain	The ship was wrecked in the Orkney Islands. She was on a voyage from Gothenburg, Sweden, to Lisbon, Portugal via Douglas, Isle of Man.
Patience	Great Britain	The ship was lost at Lindisfarne, Northumberland. She was on a voyage from London to Leith, Lothian.

== May ==
=== 16 May ===
List of shipwrecks: 16 May 1760
Ship	State	Description
French ship Atalante	French Navy	The frigate was driven ashore at Pointe au Tremble, New France in an action with HMS Diana and HMS Lowestoffe (both Royal Navy). She was burnt.
Pomone	French Navy	The frigate was driven ashore north of Cape Diamond, New France in an action with HMS Diana and HMS Lowestoffe (both Royal Navy).

=== Unknown date ===
List of shipwrecks: Unknown date in May 1760
Ship	State	Description
Eagle	Great Britain	The ship was driven ashore and wrecked on the Point of Ayre, Isle of Man. Her crew were rescued. She was on a voyage from Liverpool, Lancashire, to Guadeloupe.
Francis	Great Britain	The ship was wrecked on Fuerteventura, Canary Islands, with the loss of 24 of her crew. She was on a voyage from Liverpool to Old Calabar.
Ricks	Great Britain	The ship sank in the River Thames. She was on a voyage from London to Lisbon, Portugal.
Santa Nicholas	Spain	The ship ran aground near Cartagena. She was on a voyage from Alicante, Spain, to London.
Unicorn	Great Britain	The ship ran aground in the River Thames at Barking, Essex, and was severely damaged. She was on a voyage from London to Philadelphia.
Unity	Great Britain	The ship was sunk by a French privateer. She was on a voyage from the Firth of Forth to Riga, Russia.
York	Great Britain	The ship was lost on the Dutch coast. She was on a voyage from New York to Amsterdam, Dutch Republic.

== June ==
=== 22 June ===
List of shipwrecks: 22 June 1760
Ship	State	Description
Racehorse	Great Britain	The ship was wrecked on the Frying Pan Shoal, in the Atlantic Ocean off Cape Fear, North Carolina, British America. She was on a voyage from Africa to South Carolina, British America.

=== Unknown date ===
List of shipwrecks: Unknown date 1760
Ship	State	Description
Charming Peggy	Ireland	The ship was captured and burnt by a privateer. She was on a voyage from Lisbon, Portugal, to Kinsale, County Cork.
Nymph	Ireland	The ship was driven ashore at Start Point, Devon. She was on a voyage from Waterford to Guernsey, Channel Islands.
Sagtmsdeg	Sweden	The ship was wrecked on the Gunfleet Sand, in the North Sea. She was on a voyage from Stockholm to London, Great Britain.

== July ==
=== 8 July ===
List of shipwrecks: 8 July 1760
Ship	State	Description
Bienfaisant	French Navy	Seven Years' War: The ship was sunk in the Gulf of Saint Lawrence by HMS Fame, HMS Dorsetshire and HMS Repulse (all (Kingdom of Great Britain) Royal Navy).
Machault	French Navy	Seven Years' War: The ship was sunk in the Gulf of Saint Lawrence by HMS Fame, HMS Dorsetshire and HMS Repulse (all (Kingdom of Great Britain) Royal Navy).
Marquis de Malauze	French Navy	Seven Years' War: The ship was sunk in the Gulf of Saint Lawrence by HMS Fame, HMS Dorsetshire and HMS Repulse (all (Kingdom of Great Britain) Royal Navy).

=== Unknown date ===
List of shipwrecks: Unknown date 1760
Ship	State	Description
Margaret	Great Britain	The ship was severely damaged at Dover, Kent. She was on a voyage from Antigua to London.
Mary	Great Britain	The ship foundered in the Baltic Sea. She was on a voyage from Whitehaven, Cumberland, to Saint Petersburg, Russia.
Menette	France	The privateer was captured by HMS Aeolus ( (Kingdom of Great Britain) Royal Navy) but then foundered.

== August ==
=== 5 August ===
List of shipwrecks: 5 August 1760
Ship	State	Description
Arkhangel Mikhail (Архангел Михаил, 'Archangel Michael')	Imperial Russian Navy	The frigate ran aground on a reef north of Hogland and was wrecked on 30 September. Her crew were rescued. She was on a voyage from Kronstadt to Danzig.

=== 20 August ===
List of shipwrecks: 20 August 1760
Ship	State	Description
Unnamed	Imperial Russian Navy	The transport ship was driven ashore and wrecked at Windau. Her crew were rescued. The captain of Arkhangel Mikhail (§ 5 August) was returning on this ship.

=== 28 August ===
List of shipwrecks: 28 August 1760
Ship	State	Description
Pearl	Great Britain	The ship foundered in the Atlantic Ocean (43°N 33°W). Her crew were rescued by Constantine (Great Britain). She was on a voyage from Bristol, Gloucestershire, to Newfoundland, French America.

=== Unknown date ===
List of shipwrecks: Unknown date 1760
Ship	State	Description
Adriatick	Republic of Venice	The ship was run ashore and wrecked at St Lucar, Spain, in order to avoid capture by a vessel thought to be an Algerine Man-of-War.
Constant Anne	Great Britain	The ship foundered in the Baltic Sea. She was on a voyage from Stockholm, Sweden, to Hull, Yorkshire.
Dorothy	Great Britain	The ship foundered off Domesnes, Norway. She was on a voyage from Gothenburg, Sweden, to Hull.
Happy Return	Great Britain	The ship ran aground at Dublin, Ireland, and was severely damaged. She was on a voyage from Newhaven, Sussex, to Hamburg.
Lisbon Packet	Great Britain	The ship foundered in the North Sea off Great Yarmouth, Norfolk. She was on a voyage from Hull to Lisbon, Portugal.
Providence	Sweden	The ship was driven ashore on Heligoland. She was on a voyage from Stockholm to Hamburg.

== September ==
=== 12 September ===
List of shipwrecks: 12 September 1760
Ship	State	Description
Betty	Great Britain	The ship was wrecked at the mouth of the River Tay. She was on a voyage from Hamburg to Dundee, Perthshire.

=== 14 September ===
List of shipwrecks: 14 September 1760
Ship	State	Description
Sarah	Great Britain	The ship foundered in the Atlantic Ocean. Her crew were rescued. She was on a voyage from Newfoundland, French America to Cádiz, Spain.

=== 27 September ===
List of shipwrecks: 27 September 1760
Ship	State	Description
Maria	Great Britain	The stores ship foundered off Plymouth Hoe, Devon. She was bound for Quebec, New France.

=== 29 September ===
List of shipwrecks: 29 September 1760
Ship	State	Description
Cavalla Bianca	Ottoman Empire	A xebecca of the Ottoman Empire ran aground on the beach between the Battery Rocks and Newlyn, Mount's Bay, Cornwall. The crew of Algerian corsairs and Turkish soldiers were delighted to find they were wrecked in Cornwall rather than Spain and they were repatriated to Algiers aboard a British warship. Davies Gilbert retells a contemporary account from witnesses of the Algerine cosair running aground. The captain thought the ship was in the Atlantic Ocean at about the latitude of Cádiz. Eight of those onboard drowned.

=== Unknown date ===
List of shipwrecks: Unknown date 1760
Ship	State	Description
Adventure	Great Britain	The transport ship was damaged by fire at Plymouth, Devon.
Brilliant	Great Britain	The ship was destroyed by fire at Saint Petersburg, Russia.
Molly	Great Britain	The ship foundered in the Bristol Channel. Her crew were rescued. She was on a voyage from Neath, Glamorgan, to Plymouth.
Three Brothers	Great Britain	The ship sank in the River Thames. She was on a voyage from Weymouth, Dorset, to London.
Virginia	Great Britain	The ship was lost neat Aberthaw, Glamorgan. She was on a voyage from Guadeloupe to Bristol, Gloucestershire.

== October ==
=== 18 October ===
List of shipwrecks: 18 October 1760
Ship	State	Description
HMS Lyme	(Kingdom of Great Britain) Royal Navy	The Lyme-class frigate was wrecked off the Swedish coast.
Duc de Choiseul	French Navy	Seven Years' War: The fifth rate frigate was burnt at Port-de-Paix, Saint-Domingue in order to avoid capture by HMS Hampshire and Lively (both (Kingdom of Great Britain) Royal Navy).
Prince Edouard	French Navy	Seven Years' War: The East Indiaman was driven ashore at Port-de-Paix by HMS Hampshire ( (Kingdom of Great Britain) Royal Navy) and was burnt by her crew.

=== 19 October ===
List of shipwrecks: 19 October 1760
Ship	State	Description
Fleur-de-Lys	French Navy	Seven Years' War: The fifth rate frigate was abandoned and burnt by her crew off Port-de-Paix, Saint-Domingue, in order to avoid capture by HMS Hampshire and Lively (both (Kingdom of Great Britain) Royal Navy).

=== 25 October ===
List of shipwrecks: 25 October 1760
Ship	State	Description
Royal George	Great Britain	The transport ship foundered in the Bay of Biscay. Her crew were rescued by HMS Bedford ( (Kingdom of Great Britain) Royal Navy).

=== Unknown date ===
List of shipwrecks: Unknown date 1760
Ship	State	Description
Arch Duke	Republic of Venice	The ship sank in the River Thames. She was on a voyage from Trieste to London. She was later refloated and taken in to Blackwall, London.
HMS Conqueror	(Kingdom of Great Britain) Royal Navy	The third rate ship of the line was wrecked on St Nicholas Island, Plymouth, Devon.
Hawke	Great Britain	The ship was driven ashore near Dundee, Perthshire. She was on a voyage from London to Leith, Lothian.
Isabella	Great Britain	The ship was driven ashore at Cadzand, Dutch Republic. Her crew were rescued. She was on a voyage from Bremen to Stockton-on-Tees, County Durham.
Reward	Great Britain	The ship was driven ashore near Dundee.
Tipping	Great Britain	The ship was driven ashore and wrecked in the Orkney Islands.

== November ==
=== 1 November ===
List of shipwrecks: 1 November 1760
Ship	State	Description
Hope	Dutch Republic	The ship foundered in Liverpool Bay with the loss of all hands. She was on a voyage from Liverpool, Lancashire, Great Britain, to Hamburg.

=== 3 November ===
List of shipwrecks: 3 November 1760
Ship	State	Description
John's Adventure	Great Britain	The ship foundered in the Baltic Sea. She was on a voyage from Saint Petersburg, Russia, to Newcastle upon Tyne, Northumberland.
Pearl	Great Britain	The ship was driven ashore and wrecked at Caernarfon with the loss of all hands.

=== 14 November ===
List of shipwrecks: 14 November 1760
Ship	State	Description
[?]	Great Britain	The transport ship foundered on Sable Island. Her survivors were rescued by a New England vessel 20 January 1761.

=== 28 November ===
List of shipwrecks: 28 November 1760
Ship	State	Description
Caesar	(Kingdom of Great Britain) Admiralty	The tender was wrecked at Pwlldu Head, Glamorgan. Her crew survived, but 65 pressed men and women, who were locked in the hold, perished. She was on a voyage from Bristol, Gloucestershire, to Plymouth, Devon.

=== Unknown date ===
List of shipwrecks: Unknown date 1760
Ship	State	Description
Abraham & Sarah	Great Britain	The ship was lost at Port Isaac, Cornwall. Her crew were rescued. She was on a voyage from London to Bristol, Gloucestershire.
Augustus Cæsar	Great Britain	The ship was driven ashore at Highlake, Cheshire, and wrecked. She was on a voyage from London to Liverpool, Lancashire.
Britannia	Great Britain	The ship foundered off the coast of Caithness. She was on a voyage from Newcastle upon Tyne, Northumberland, to Boston, Massachusetts, British America.
Britannia	Great Britain	The ship was lost on the coast of Portugal. She was on a voyage from Philadelphia, Pennsylvania, British America, to Lisbon, Portugal.
Britannia	Great Britain	The ship capsized in the River Thames. She was on a voyage from Jamaica to London.
Charming Sally	Ireland	The ship was wrecked on the coast of Cornwall, Great Britain. Her crew were rescued. She was on a voyage from Hamburg to Cork.
Emanuel	Denmark	The ship foundered off Bergen, Norway, with the loss of all hands. She was on a voyage from St Croix to Copenhagen.
Hayfield	Great Britain	The ship was driven ashore and wrecked on Heligoland. She was on a voyage from Philadelphia to Hamburg.
Hope	Great Britain	The ship was driven ashore near Stralsund, Sweden. She was on a voyage from Gefle, Sweden, to Hull, Yorkshire.
Jane	Great Britain	The ship was lost on Borkum. She was on a voyage from Banff, Aberdeenshire, to Rotterdam, Dutch Republic.
Jane	Great Britain	The ship foundered in the Gulf of Finland. She was on a voyage from London to Saint Petersburg, Russia.
Lady Susanna	Hamburg	The ship was lost on Heligoland with the loss of all hands. She was on a voyage from London to Hamburg.
Love and Unity	Great Britain	The ship foundered in the Baltic Sea. She was on a voyage from Saint Petersburg to London.
Nossa Senhora da Ajuda	Portugal	The ship was lost on the French coast. She was on a voyage from London, Great Britain, to Porto.
Nostra Señora de Begona de Bilboa	Spain	The ship was lost off the Dutch coast. She was on a voyage from Amsterdam, Dutch Republic, to Seville.
Nostra Señora de Muriel	Spain	The ship was lost off the Isles of Scilly, Great Britain. She was on a voyage from Bilbao to the Isle of Man.
Samuel	Great Britain	The ship ran aground in Lancaster Bay and was wrecked with the loss of six of her crew. She was on a voyage from Jamaica to Liverpool.
St Esprit	France	The ship was lost near Havre de Grâce. She was on a voyage from Saint-Malo to Cádiz, Spain
Yedinorog (Единорог, 'Unicorn')	Imperial Russian Navy	The pink was driven ashore and wrecked on the island of Hitra, Norway with the loss of at least fifteen lives. There were ten survivors. She was on a voyage from Kronstadt to Arkhangelsk.

== December ==
=== 4 December ===
List of shipwrecks: 4 December 1760
Ship	State	Description
Eagle	Great Britain	The ship was destroyed by fire in the River Thames. She was on a voyage from Liverpool, Lancashire, to London.

=== 5 December ===
List of shipwrecks: 5 December 1760
Ship	State	Description
Sea-post	Dutch Republic	The ship was lost near Hartland Point, Devon, Great Britain, with the loss of all hands. She was on a voyage from Santa Cruz to Amsterdam.
St Thomas	Great Britain	The ship was lost near "St Sebastians" with the loss of all but one of her crew.

=== 6 December ===
List of shipwrecks: 6 December 1760
Ship	State	Description
Damsel	Great Britain	The ship was lost near "Rotta". She was on a voyage from Newfoundland, French America to Cádiz, Spain.

=== 21 December ===
List of shipwrecks: 21 December 1760
Ship	State	Description
Assurance	Great Britain	The ship was wrecked at Ostend, Dutch Republic. She was on a voyage from London to Ostend.

=== 25 December ===
List of shipwrecks: 25 December 1760
Ship	State	Description
Nostra Segñora Segionora de la Marie	Spain	The ship was driven ashore and wrecked at Plymouth, Devon, Kingdom of Great Britain. She was on a voyage from La Rochelle, France, to Havre de Grâce, France.

=== Unknown date ===
List of shipwrecks: Unknown date 1760
Ship	State	Description
Adventure	Great Britain	The ship was driven ashore and wrecked on Gotland, Sweden. She was on a voyage from Saint Petersburg, Russia, to London.
Betty	Great Britain	The ship was lost in the Scottish Highlands. She was on a voyage from "Drunton" to Ballyshannon, County Donegal, Ireland.
Bonetta	flag unknown	The ship was lost on the Portuguese coast. She was on a voyage from Falmouth, Cornwall, Great Britain, to a port in "Italy".
Cæsar	Great Britain	The ship was driven ashore at Deal, Kent.
Charming Peggy	Great Britain	The ship sank in the Elbe with the loss of all hands. She was on a voyage from Borrowstounness, Lothian, to Hamburg.
Charming Sally	Great Britain	The victualling ship foundered in the Bay of Biscay. Her crew were rescued.
Concord	Great Britain	The ship was wrecked on Hurst beach. She was on a voyage from Pool, Dorset, to Portsmouth, Hampshire.
Cornwal	Great Britain	The ship foundered in the Baltic Sea. She was on a voyage from London to Saint Petersburg.
Duke	Great Britain	The transport ship was driven ashore at La Rochelle, France. She was later refloated and taken in to Dover, Kent.
Duke of York	Great Britain	The ship was driven ashore at Corton, Suffolk. She was on a voyage from Stockton-on-Tees, County Durham, to Saint Petersburg.
Enighuden	Denmark	The ship was lost near Mandal, Norway, with some loss of life. She was on a voyage from Copenhagen to Guernsey, Channel Islands.
Esther	Great Britain	The ship was driven ashore and wrecked at Highlake, Cheshire. She was on a voyage from South Carolina, British America, to Liverpool, Lancashire.
Friendship	Great Britain	The ship was lost near La Rochelle.
Friends Love	Great Britain	The ship was lost near Wells-next-the-Sea, Norfolk. She was on a voyage from Stockton-on-Tees to Rotterdam, Dutch Republic.
Garland	Great Britain	The ship was driven ashore and wrecked in the Orkney Islands. She was on a voyage from Leith, Lothian, to London.
Hope	Great Britain	The ship was lost near Boulogne, France. Her crew were rescued. She was on a voyage from Jersey, Channel Islands, to London.
Jannet	Great Britain	The ship was driven ashore and wrecked at North Field. She was on a voyage from Rotterdam to Portsey, Hampshire.
Jonge Arnoldus	Dutch Republic	The ship was wrecked near Cowes, Isle of Wight, Great Britain. She was on a voyage from Barcelona, Spain, to Rotterdam.
Kingston	Great Britain	The ship was driven ashore near Hearn Bay, Kent.
Montague	(Kingdom of Great Britain) British America	The patrol vessel, a brigantine sank in the Canard River, Nova Scotia.
Providence	Great Britain	The ship was driven ashore at Deal. She was on a voyage from London to Whitehaven, Cumberland. She was later refloated and taken in to Dover, Kent.
Sally	Great Britain	The ship was driven ashore and wrecked south of Newcastle upon Tyne, Northumberland. She was on a voyage from Virginia, British America, to Leith.
Sea-horse	Great Britain	The ship was driven ashore at La Rochelle.
St Erick	Great Britain	The ship was lost on the Dutch coast. She was on a voyage from Stockholm, Sweden, to Bristol, Gloucestershire.
Success	Great Britain	The ship was lost on The Needles, Isle of Wight. She was on a voyage from Saint Petersburg to Bristol, Gloucestershire.
Susanna	Great Britain	The ship was lost near La Rochelle.
Thomas and Mary	Great Britain	The ship was driven ashore at Margate, Kent. She was on a voyage from Cork, Ireland, to London.
Three Brothers	Great Britain	The ship was driven ashore at Margate. She was on a voyage from Dublin to London.
William	Great Britain	The ship was driven ashore near La Rochelle.
Windsor	Great Britain	The ship sprang a leak in the English Channel whilst on a voyage from Porto, Portugal, to Plymouth. She put into Lyme, Dorset, where she sank.
Young Katherine	Dutch Republic	The ship was wrecked on the Gunfleet Sand, in the North Sea off the coast of Essex, Great Britain.

== Unknown date ==
List of shipwrecks: Unknown date 1760
Ship	State	Description
Anne	Great Britain	The ship was lost off the coast of Carolina British America. She was on a voyage from Cádiz, Spain, to Carolina.
Charming Betty	Great Britain	The ship foundered in the Atlantic Ocean off Cape Hatteras, North Carolina, British America, with the loss of nine of her crew. She was on a voyage from Lisbon to Virginia, British America.
Charming Sally	Great Britain	The ship struck an anchor and foundered in the Cattewater. She was on a voyage from Plymouth, Devon, to Quiberon Bay, France.
Charming Sally	Great Britain	The ship foundered off Jamaica. Her crew were rescued.
Cupid	Great Britain	The ship foundered in the Atlantic Ocean off St. John's, Newfoundland, British America. She was on a voyage from St. John's to the Leeward Islands.
Denham	Great Britain	The ship was burnt at Bencoolen, Indonesia to prevent capture by the French.
Dolphin	Great Britain	The ship was lost at Guadeloupe whilst departing for London.
Elizabeth	Great Britain	The ship foundered in the Gulf of Florida. Her crew were rescued. She was on a voyage from Jamaica to London.
Fair American	Great Britain	The ship capsized in the Saint Lawrence River and was lost.
Four Cantons	Great Britain	The ship was lost off Edenton, North Carolina, British America. She was on a voyage from Jamaica to Edenton.
Fox	Great Britain	The ship was lost off Antigua.
Friend's Adventure	(Kingdom of Great Britain) British America	The ship sank in the Piscataqua River. She was bound for Jamaica.
Greyhound	Great Britain	The ship foundered off "Cape Molo" with some loss of life. She was on a voyage from Cyprus to "Scandereon".
HMS Harwich	(Kingdom of Great Britain) Royal Navy	The fourth rate was wrecked.
Kingston	Great Britain	The ship foundered whilst on a voyage from Havannah, Captaincy General of Cuba, to Philadelphia, Pennsylvania, British America. Her crew were rescued.
Mancheoneal	Great Britain	The ship foundered west of Bermuda. She was on a voyage from London to Bermuda.
Maria	Great Britain	The ship was lost in Senegal.
Minerva Packet	Great Britain	The ship foundered in the Atlantic Ocean. Her crew were rescued by Hawke (Great Britain). ~She was on a voyage from Jamaica to London.
Molly	Great Britain	The ship foundered whilst on a voyage from South Carolina to Pool. Her crew were rescued.
Nancy	Great Britain	The schooner sprang a leak and foundered in the Atlantic Ocean off Cape Hatteras before 28 August. Her crew survived. She was on a voyage from Philadelphia, Pennsylvania, to Cape Fear, North Carolina.
Neptune	Great Britain	The ship was driven ashore and wrecked 25 nautical miles (46 km) south of Cape Henry, Virginia, British America.
Prosperity	Ireland	The ship was driven ashore and wrecked on Guadeloupe by a French privateer. Her crew were rescued. She was on a voyage from Cork to Guadeloupe.
Providence	Great Britain	The ship foundered in the Gulf of Florida. she was on a voyage from Jamaica to London.
Royal George	Great Britain	The victualling ship was lost in the Îles des Saintes. Ten of her crew survived.
Santa Martin	Spain	The whaler foundered in the Atlantic Ocean. Her crew were rescued.
St George	Ireland	The ship was lost near New York, British America. She was on a voyage from Cork to New York.
Stretham	Great Britain	The ship foundered in Bombay Bay. Her crew were rescued.
Thomas and Richard	Great Britain	The ship was driven ashore and wrecked 25 nautical miles (46 km) south of Cape Henry.
Union	Great Britain	The ship was wrecked on the African coast. Her crew were rescued.
Venus	Great Britain	The ship was run down and sunk whilst on a voyage from London to Quebec, New France. Her crew were rescued.
