= Starrs Point, Nova Scotia =

Community in Nova Scotia, Canada

Coordinates: 45°06′59″N 64°22′41″W

Starrs Point in Nova Scotia

Starrs Point is a community in the Canadian province of Nova Scotia, located in Kings County two miles (3 km) northeast of Port Williams. Starrs Point faces the Minas Basin to the east and separates the mouths of the Cornwallis River and the Canard River. It is an agricultural area noted for apple orchards, farming and more recently vineyards.

== History ==
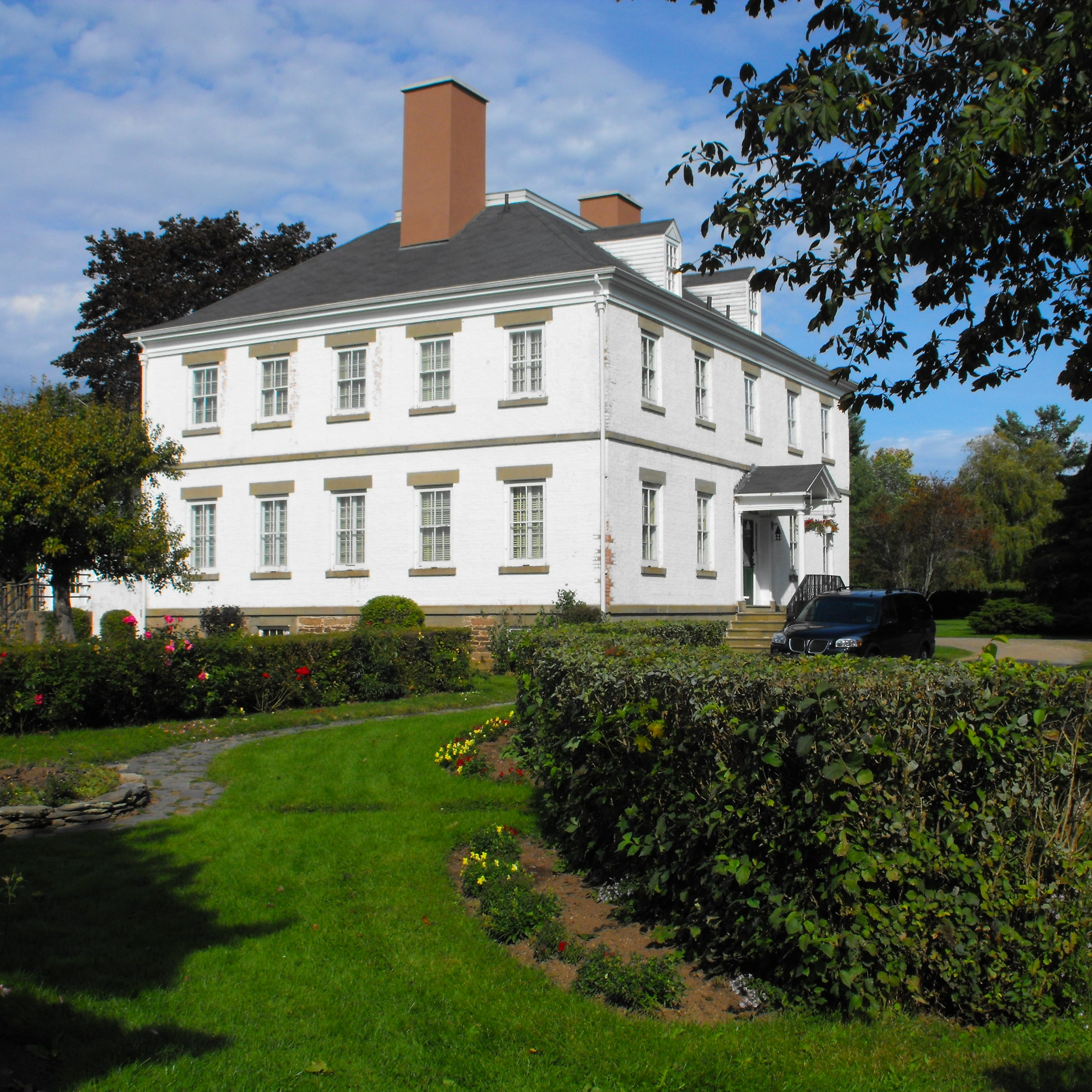
Stately Prescott House at Starrs Point (c.1811)

Starrs Point was called "Nesogwjtk" (eel point) or "Nesoogwitk" (point between two rivers) by the Mi'kmaq People. The point was settled by Acadians in the late 1600 as part of the Rivière-aux-Canards settlement. It was called Boudreau's Point, after the Boudreau family who farmed the point. The Boudreaus also operated a ferry and schooner landing from the north side of the point along the Cornwallis River called Boudreau's Bank, where a flat bank of sandstone allowed schooners to safely beach and unload on at low tide. Acadians from the Rivière-aux-Canards settlement were expelled from this point in the 1755 Bay of Fundy Campaign of the Expulsion of the Acadians marched to Boudreau's Bank by British troops to be loaded on deportation ships.

The New England Planters arrived at Boudreau's Bank on June 4, 1760 to settle the vacated Acadian lands, discovering 60 abandoned ox carts and yokes at the landing used by the Acadians to take their belongings into exile. The point was intended as the main town settlement of the Cornwallis Township settlement, facing the Horton Township on the other side of the Cornwallis River. A town grid for Cornwallis with a parade ground was surveyed around the landing. However, settlers found that nearby Port Williams, Kentville and Canning made better town sites, leaving the official town site at Starrs Point to develop instead as rich and productive farmland. The original grid of streets of the Cornwallis town site is today known as the Town Plot and is marked by a cairn commemorating the arrival of the Planters. The community became known as Starrs Point, after the Starr family who emerged as major landowners, led by Major Samuel Starr, one of the first Planters settlers in the township. One of the members of the Starr family, John Starr, became an early Member of the Legislature for Kings County.

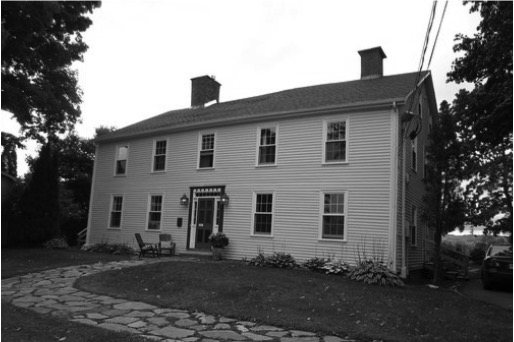
Fort Hughes (1778), Starrs Point, Nova Scotia

In the American Revolution, raids by American privateers against the Planter settlements led the government to build Fort Hughes (Nova Scotia) in 1778 beside the militia parade ground at Starrs Point, a building which survives today as one of the oldest in the area known as the "Planters Barracks".

In 1812, farmers in Starrs Point combined forces with farmers in Canard to build the Wellington Dyke across the Canard River to the north of Starrs Point. Completed in 1825, the dyke protects 3,000 acres (12 km^{2}) along the north side of Starrs Point, formerly submerged by tides of the Minas Basin.

Charles Ramage Prescott chose Starrs Point to establish a large farm and country estate in 1812 which played an important role in developing the area's apple industry. Today his home, Prescott House is now a provincial museum.

The Fox Hill Cemetery dates back to 1762, named for Cornelius Fox, a teacher at the small school located in Starrs Point. Burial here includes local residents including Burbidge, Belcher, Rand, Gates The Rand family operated a popular dairy farm here for six generations, with the recent generations adding cheese production.
