= Cornwallis Township =

Place in Nova Scotia, Canada

Coordinates: 45.19°N 64.52°W

Cornwallis Township was one of the original townships of Kings County, Nova Scotia. The township was named after Edward Cornwallis, the founder of Halifax, Nova Scotia. It bordered Aylesford Township to the west and Horton Township to the south. While the name has fallen into disuse on maps, overshadowed by the growth of individual towns and villages within the township, many historical places and documents refer to Cornwallis. The Parish of Cornwallis, however, is still in use today by several churches after more than 250 years.

== History ==
After the French colonists and the Acadians were commanded to leave Nova Scotia in the Great Expulsion, the area was relatively desolate. The Township was established by a group historians refer to as the New England Planters. In the early 1760s the Planters brought with them the colonial pattern of land division; each town or township was to contain one hundred thousand acres.

While an official town plot was laid out for Cornwallis Township in what is now Starr's Point, towns actually took shape around Planter settlements at Port Williams, Kentville, Kingsport and Canning. A generation after the Planters, a sudden influx of United Empire Loyalist settlers arrived to escape the Revolutionary War in New England further changing township settlements.
