= Wellington Dyke =

Coordinates: 45°7′36.7″N 64°24′12.5″W

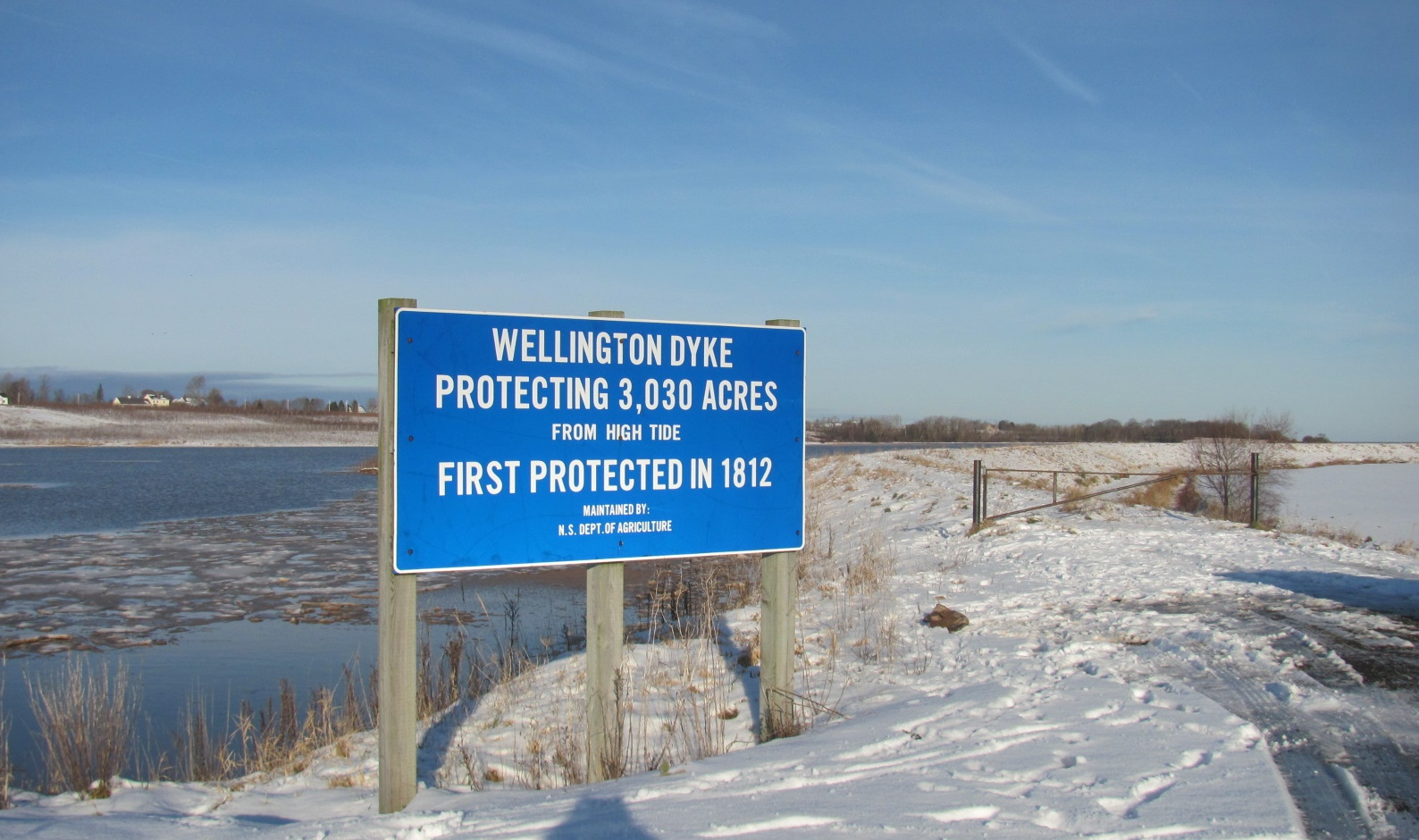
Wellington Dyke near high tide in December 2011

The Wellington Dyke is an agricultural dyke in Kings County, Nova Scotia protecting over 3,000 acres (12 km^{2}) of farmland along the Canard River between the communities of Starr's Point and Canard in Nova Scotia, Canada. Built by local farmers, it was begun in 1817 and completed in 1825. Today the dyke is owned by the Department of Agriculture of Nova Scotia in partnership with the farmers of the Wellington Marsh Body.

== Origins ==
The rich farmland along the river were originally dyked by the Acadians, who knew it as the Rivière-aux-Canards, to claim highly productive farmland from the Bay of Fundy tidal meadows of the Minas Basin. Beginning in the late 1600s, Acadians built progressively larger dykes across the Rivière-aux-Canards beginning first with its upper reaches at Upper Dyke, then the Middle Dyke and finally with the Grand Dyke near Port Williams. A sluice with a one-way valve, known to the Acadians as the "aboiteau", allowed the river to drain but shut out the incoming tide. After the Acadians were expelled in 1755, the New England Planters settled in the area, beginning in 1760. The Planters repaired the Acadian dykelands and gradually began to expand the dyked areas. The Planters carried out this work by forming "marsh bodies" which are elected associations of farmers owning dykeland fields who share the costs of building and maintaining dykes.

== Beginning ==
Farmers in Starrs Point and Canard began to discuss building a large dyke at the mouth of the Canard River in 1809. They may have been inspired by the three mile long Wickwire Dyke completed near Wolfville in 1808. The Planters at Canard had made steady additions to the Acadian dykes along the edges of the river but a dyke at near the mouth of the river would reclaim an additional 700 acres of farmland from the Minas Basin and save the maintenance of the many smaller dykes along the river which protected over 2,000 acres. A plan was organized in 1811. Materials were gathered and construction began in 1817. The dyke was named after the Duke of Wellington in honour of his decisive victory over Napoleon in 1815. The new structure was a dramatic change from the Acadian dyke systems which were only a few feet high in most places. The Wellington Dyke would be 50 feet high, 120 feet at the base and over 300 feet long with additional embankments stretching over a mile just in from the mouth of the river. The aboiteau or sluice which allowed the river to drain was 100 feet and 14 feet wide. The work was financed and organized solely by the 70 farmers of the Wellington Marsh Body. It was built in stages seasonally, between high tides using only human and animal labour. At its peak over 100 teams of horses and oxen and 300 men worked on the dyke. Rum rations were issued as an incentive with extra shares for those who had to work in the water. In some places the swift tidal currents swept away nine out of every ten cart loads of fill.

== Completion ==
The dyke was nearly complete in 1822 when storm at high tide found a leak on the south side of the dyke and created a breach allowing the Minas Basin to flood in and destroying much of the dyke and years of work. Work was renewed the next year with some assistance from the provincial government. Finally in September 1824 the dyke walls were largely complete. Finishing work on the facings and the addition of a road on top completed the dike in 1825. The total cost was over 21,000 pounds. Aside from 550 pounds from the province, all the costs were covered by the farmers along the river. Many had mortgaged their farms to build the dyke and some faced foreclosure. However, with the dyke's completion, over 3,000 of acres were protected by the single dyke which gave farmers on the Canard River the lowest maintenance costs per acre of any dykelands in the Maritime Region. The road on top of the dyke provided a new connection between Starr's Point and Canard which became known as the Wellington Dyke Road. The dyke also provided protection for numerous roads and bridges further upriver.

== The Dyke in later years ==
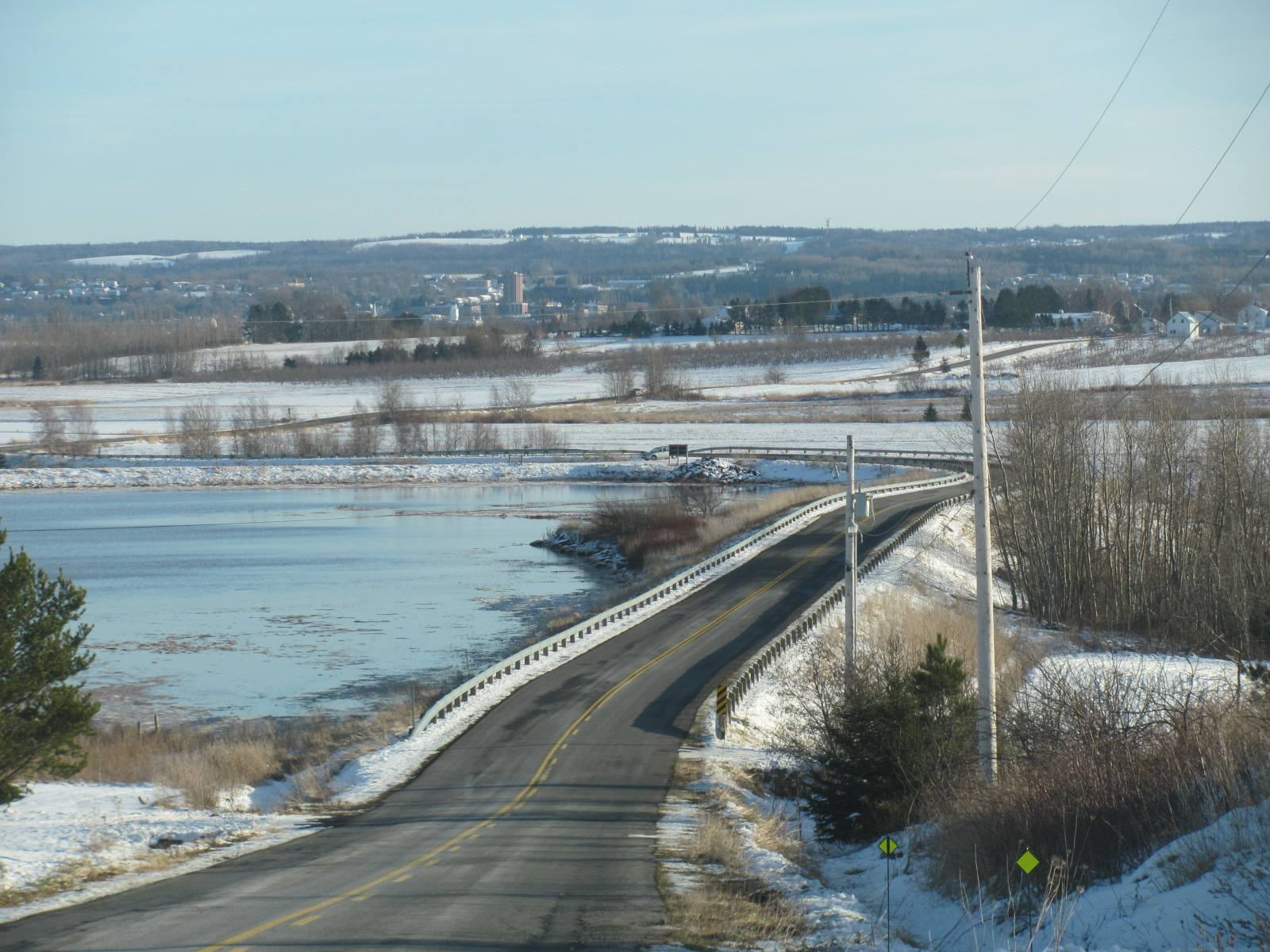
Wellington Dyke and Wellington Dyke Road, looking towards Starr's Point

Once built, the dyke proved solid and enduring, surviving major storms such as the Saxby Gale of 1869. The dyke lands of the Canard River proved very rewarding. While average dyked marsh land produced two tons of hay per acre, the Canard fields yielded five tons per acre. Hay sales proved very rewarding in the boom years of the hay market in the late 19th century when eastern urban centres paid high prices for the rich marsh hay produced from dyke lands.

However, after 1920 and the arrival of automobiles, the demand for marsh hay declined. By the 1940s, the dropping earnings of dyke lands, combined with the need for a new sluice posed a challenge for the dyke's owners. The Wellington Dyke received a major rebuild in 1947 with a new sluice and sidewalls constructed immediately behind the old dyke. The reconstruction was one of the first projects of a new federal-provincial partnership which was followed by 80 dyke repair projects across the Maritimes. The program came to be known as the Maritime Marshlands Rehabilitation Administration in 1948 with the federal government taking ownership and maintenance of the dykes, while the marsh bodies maintained the drainage ditches behind them. In 1970, Nova Scotia's Department of Agriculture took ownership of the Wellington Dyke and other large agricultural dykes in the province. The province installed a new three-box concrete sluice in the aboiteau in 1976. The 70 farmers of the Wellington Marsh Body continue to take care of the drainage network behind the dyke. An annual grant from the province to the Marsh body funds regular maintenance of the dyke wall itself. A historic shipwreck is thought to lie just downstream of the Wellington Dyke, the wreck of the brigantine Montague, one of the ships which brought the New England Planters to the area but sank in the Canard River. An ongoing search led by the Kings County Museum has continued to search for traces of the wreck on the banks and bed of the river near the Wellington Dyke.
