= Steam Mill Village =

Community in Nova Scotia, Canada

Coordinates: 45°6′35.9″N 64°30′50.9″W

Steam Mill Village in Nova Scotia

Steam Mill Village is a rural community in the Canadian province of Nova Scotia, located north of Kentville in Kings County. It is named after an early steam-powered saw mill.

== Geography ==
Steam Mill Village is located about 10 km north of Kentville. Route 359, runs through the community. Steam Mill occupies low sandy hills of glacial till marked by stands of oak trees and many large pines. The upper reaches of the Canard River flow through the northern part of Steam Mill Village.

== History ==
Steam Mill is near the headwaters of the Canard River and was once the head of tide from the river's saltwater estuary. The area was used by early Acadian settlers and later New England Planters at nearby Upper Dyke on the Canard River who used the Steam Mill area in the 18th century as upland pasture. Near the present day crossing of Route 359 over the river, the Acadians built the first of series of dykes across the Canard River, pushing back the salt water tides to create highly productive farmland along the river. In the 19th century, the community was the site of one of the first steam saw mills in Kings County, thus earning its name. The mill is believed to have operated where the Elm Grove cemetery stands today. In 1889, the Cornwallis Valley Railway, a branch line of the Dominion Atlantic Railway arrived which later became the Kingsport Subdivision of the DAR with the railway station at Steam Mill Village appearing as "Mill Village" on railway timetables. Camp Aldershot, a militia training camp was established in 1904 beside Steam Mill. After World War II, the community became the site of several plants selling bulk feed and agricultural supplies located along the railway. In 1961, the Cornwallis Valley Railway was abandoned beyond Steam Mill, making the community the terminus of the "CVR Spur" serving the bulk feed mills. Railway service ended completely in 1993 and the tracks were removed in 1994.
