= Nova Scotia Route 358 =

Highway in Nova Scotia, Canada

Route 358

Route information
- Maintained by Nova Scotia Department of Transportation and Infrastructure Renewal
- Length: 30 km (19 mi)

Major junctions
- South end: Trunk 1 in Greenwich
- Route 341 in Canard; Route 221 in Canning
- North end: Rogers Road in Scots Bay

Location
- Country: Canada
- Province: Nova Scotia

Highway system
- Provincial highways in Nova Scotia; 100-series
← Route 357	→ Route 359

Route 358 is a collector road in the Canadian province of Nova Scotia.

== Location ==
It is located in Kings County and connects Greenwich at Trunk 1 with Scots Bay. Between Port Williams and Canard, the highway crosses the Canard River and the low fields of the riverbank in a wide curve, tracing the path of the Grand Dyke, built by the Acadians about 1750.

== Communities ==
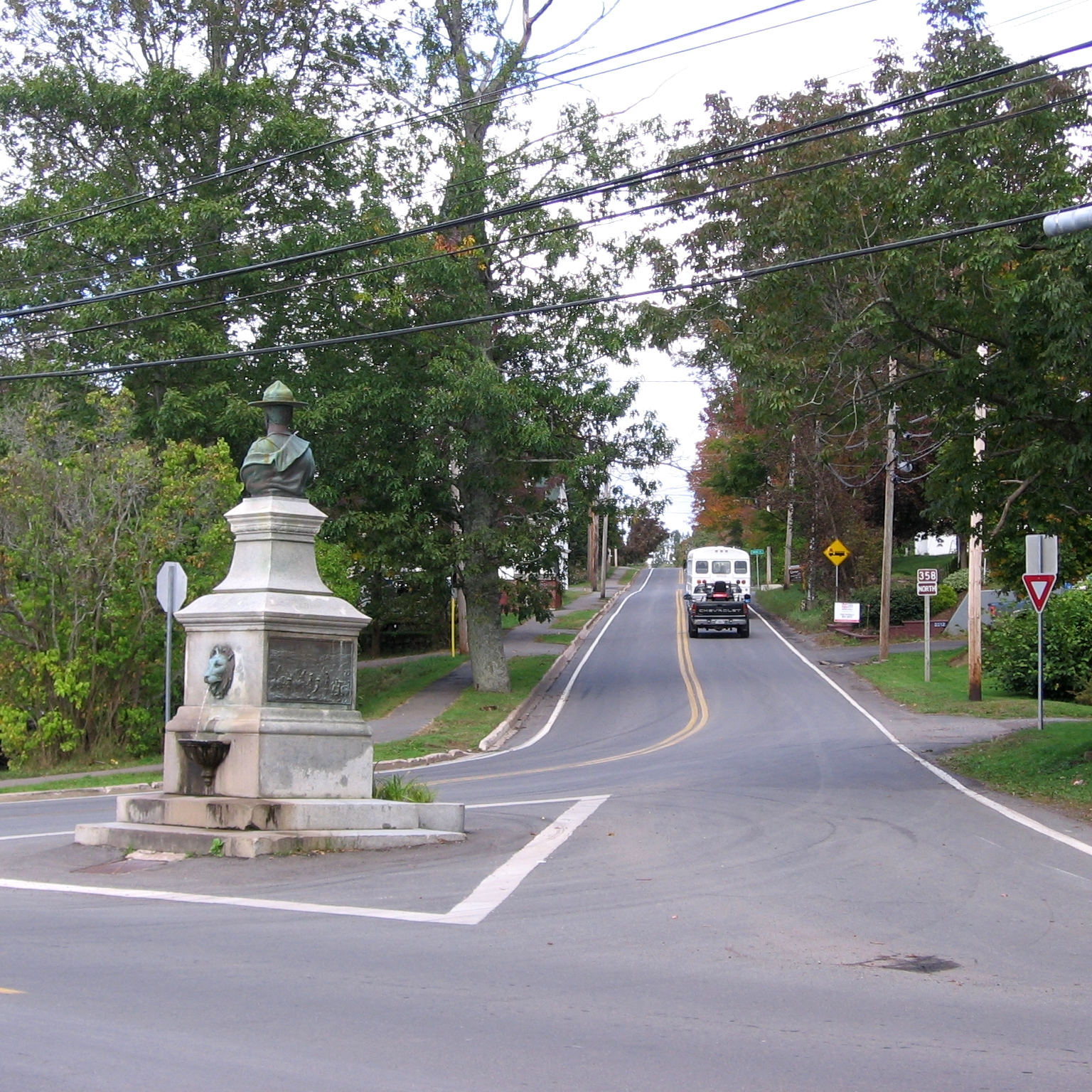
Route 358 in Canning

- Greenwich
- Port Williams
- Canard
- Hillaton
- Canning
- Scots Bay

== Parks ==
- Scots Bay Provincial Park
- Blomidon Provincial Park
- Cape Split Provincial Park Reserve

== History ==
The section of the Collector Highway 358 from Canard to Canning was designated as part of the Trunk Highway 41.

== See also ==
- List of Nova Scotia provincial highways
