= Lawrence (schooner) =

History

Nova Scotia
- Name: Lawrence
- Namesake: Charles Lawrence
- Owner: Malachy Salter and Robert Saunderson
- Port of registry: Halifax, Nova Scotia
- Launched: 16 November 1756

General characteristics
- Type: Privateer Schooner
- Tons burthen: 100 bm
- Sail plan: schooner
- Crew: 100
- Armament: 14 carriage guns, 4-pounders, 24 swivel guns, small arms, ammunition for six months cruise

Lawrence was a schooner and the first privateer to be licensed out of the port of Halifax, Nova Scotia. The privateer was launched on 16 November 1756 during the French and Indian War. The ship was under the command of Captain Joseph Rouse with Robison Fort as first lieutenant, Andrew Gardner as mate. Gardner kept a ships log for six months as the ship sailed from Halifax to Bermuda. The log is one of the few to survive from this time period. The ship was named after Nova Scotia Governor Charles Lawrence. The vessel participated in the Battle of the Plains of Abraham (1759). On 21 April the Lawrence was battered and the only craft that was available to General James Murray. The schooner was sent eastward to hasten Lord Colville's fleet when it arrived in the river.
