= Prescott House Museum =

Historic house in Starr's Point, Nova Scotia

Coordinates: 45°06′38″N 64°22′44″W

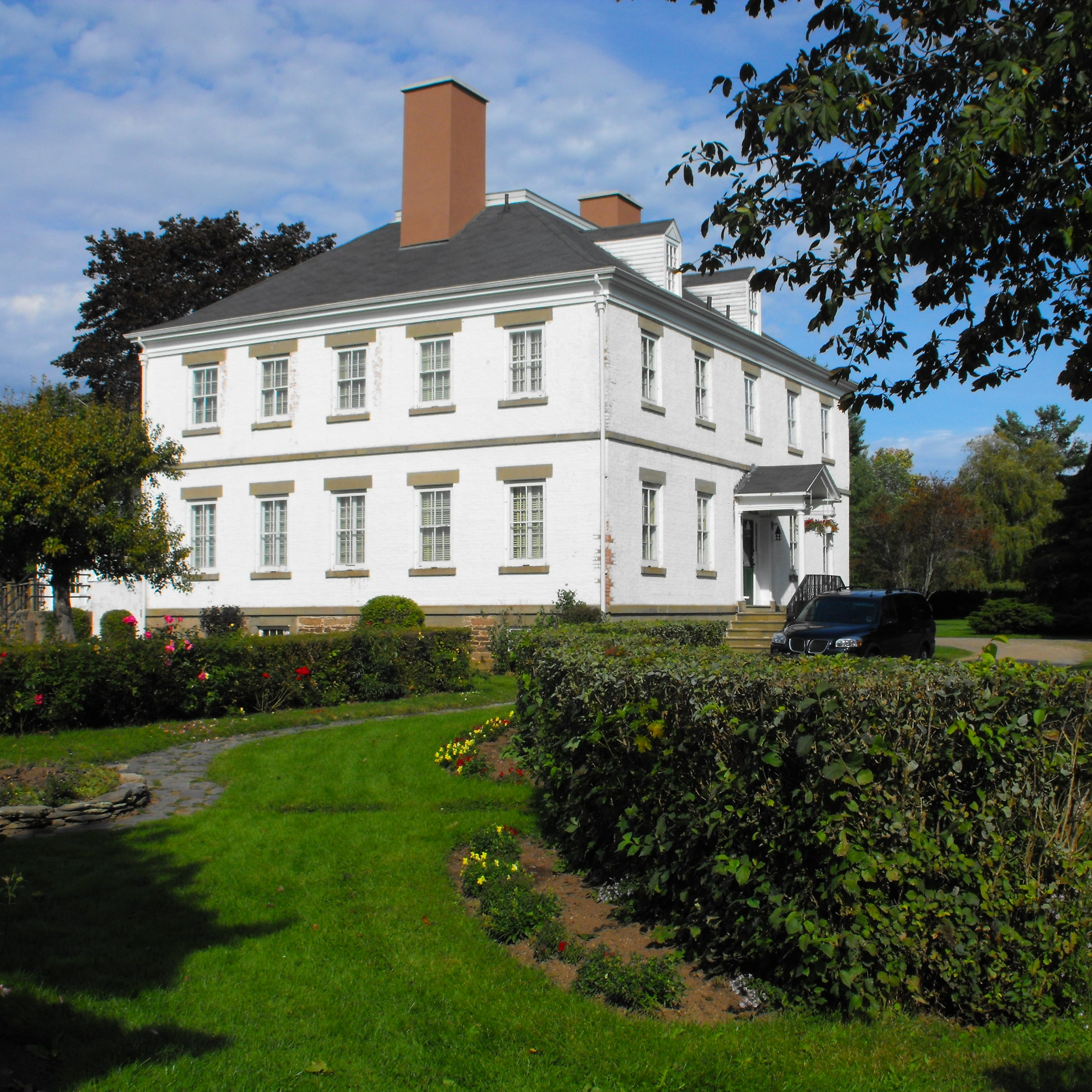
- Established: 1971
- Location: 1633 Starr's Point Road, Starr's Point, Nova Scotia Canada
- Type: National Historic Site of Canada
- Website: http://museum.gov.ns.ca/prh/en/home

National Historic Site of Canada
- Official name: Acacia Grove / Prescott House National Historic Site of Canada
- Designated: 1969

Nova Scotia Heritage Property Act
- Type: Provincially Registered Property
- Designated: 1983/08/04
- Reference no.: 00PNS0015

Prescott House Museum is a historic house and gardens located in Starr's Point, Nova Scotia which is part of the Nova Scotia Museum. Built between 1799 and 1809 by Charles Ramage Prescott as the centrepiece of his country estate called Acacia Grove, it is one of the best preserved Georgian houses in Canada.

== History ==
Prescott, a wealthy merchant from Halifax, Nova Scotia purchased the land when he took early retirement from his shipping and trading career. He used Acacia Grove as a base for agricultural experiments, importing a wide variety of plants, especially apple varieties which he shared freely with area growers. When Prescott died in 1859, the house was purchased and maintained for several decades by the Kaye family. However later owners neglected the house and by the 1890s, it fell into ruin. In 1931 the property was purchased by Mary Allison Prescott, the great granddaughter of Charles Prescott. She restored the house and lived in it with her two sisters until 1970. They donated the house to the Province of Nova Scotia in 1971.

The house was designated a National Historic Site of Canada in 1969. It is also a Provincially Registered Property under the province's Heritage Property Act.

== Museum ==
The house is operated as part of the Nova Scotia Museum system and explores Prescott's life, Georgian architecture, the apple industry and the lives of the Prescott sisters. Fully restored rooms depict both the Georgian period of Charles Prescott's time and the later era of the 1930s and 40s when it was restored by the Prescott sisters. The Nova Scotia government closed the Museum permanently recently of Feb 26 2026.

In 2009, the museum and grounds were used to film the docudrama, Darwin's Darkest Hour (working title, "I Darwin').

== Closure ==
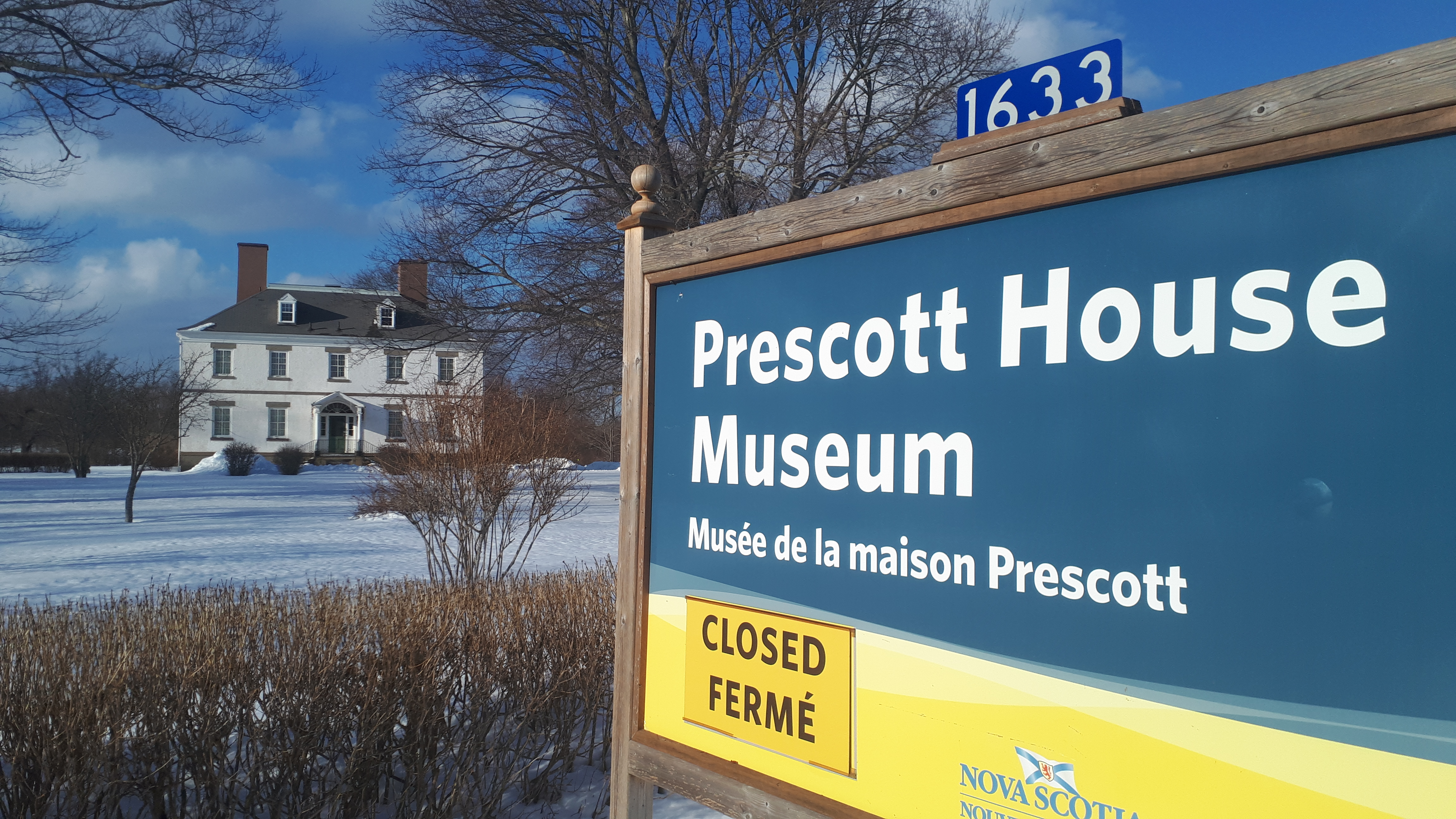
Prescott House Museum just after its closure was announced.

On February 20, 2026 the Conservative Government of Premier Tim Houston announced that the Prescott House Museum would be permanently closed effective immediately along with 11 other sites of the Nova Scotia Museum. The Conservative Kings North MLA and Finance Minister John Lohr said the museum's recent annual attendance of just over 1,200 was too low and that Nova Scotia has too many rural museums. No decision has been made on the disposal of the house or its artifact contents.
