= Montague (brigantine) =

History

Nova Scotia
- Owner: Private
- Operator: Provincial Marine
- Port of registry: Halifax, Nova Scotia
- Commissioned: May 28, 1759
- In service: 1759-1760
- Out of service: December 1760
- Homeport: Halifax, Nova Scotia
- Fate: Sank on Canard River, Kings County, Nova Scotia, December, 1760

General characteristics
- Tonnage: 90 tons
- Sail plan: brigantine
- Complement: 20
- Armament: 10 carriage guns and 10 swivel guns

Montague was an armed brigantine of the Nova Scotia government that patrolled Nova Scotian waters during the Seven Years' War as part Nova Scotia's Provincial Marine (not to be confused with the Provincial Marine under the Royal Navy in British North America). Montague played a notable role in beginning New England Planter settlements until she was wrecked in the Canard River in Kings County, Nova Scotia in December 1760.

A former privateer brigantine, Montaque received a Letter of Marque on May 28, 1759 and was commanded by Jeremiah Rogers. She was commissioned by the Governor of Nova Scotia Charles Lawrence as a patrol vessel in November 1759. Montague patrolled against French privateers, moved soldiers to garrisons, attacked Acadian partisans and assisted in the final phases of the Expulsion of the Acadians. One of her final duties was to assist the landing of the New England Planters in the Minas Basin. Montague landed supplies and provided security for the settlements until early December 1760. After having landed supplies at a landing on the Habitant River, Montague was descending the river when she became stuck on a river bank in the tidal estuary of the river. When the tide went out, the brigantine fell on her side in the steep river channel and became a total loss. The crew of 20 and the pilot were uninjured.

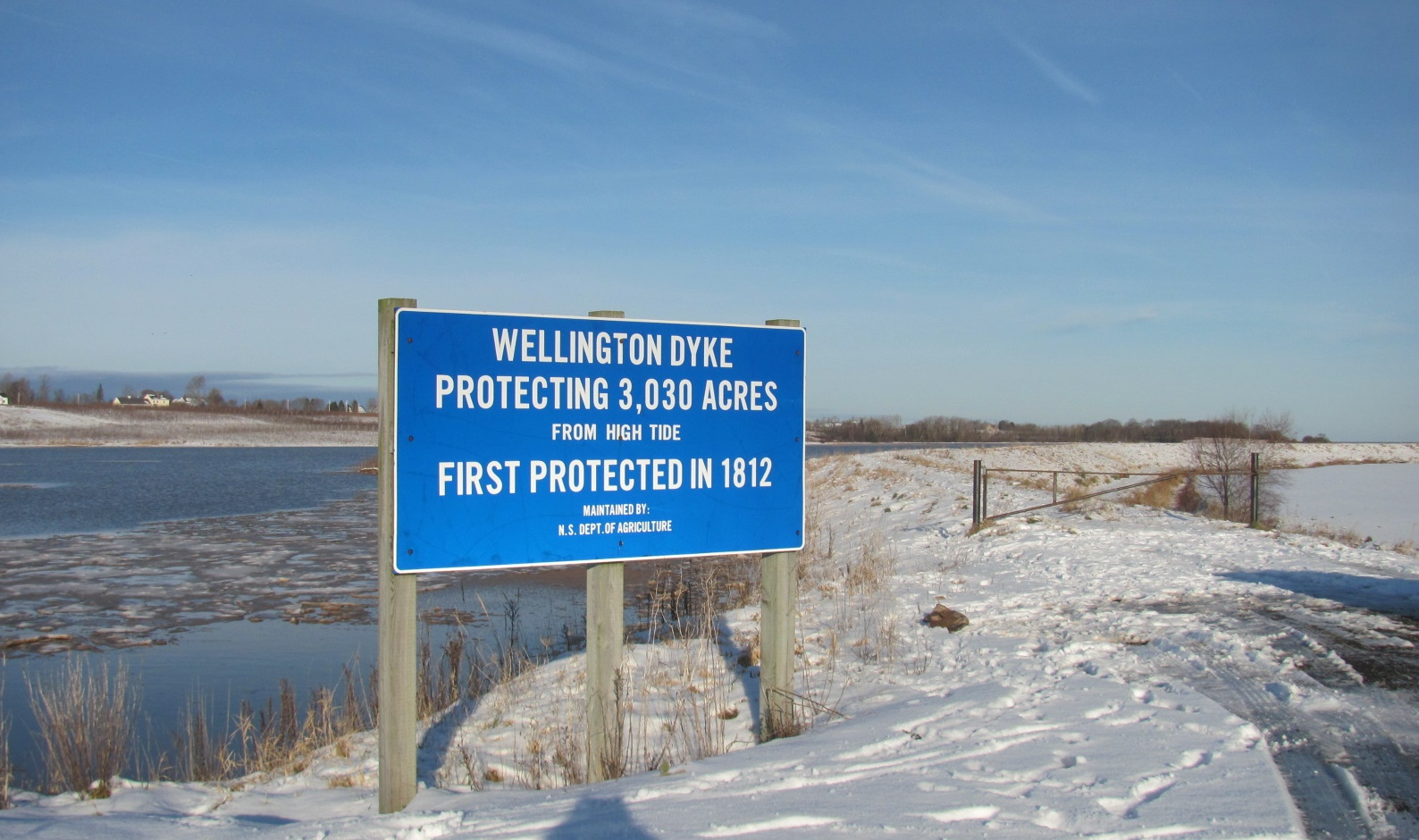
The lower estuary of the Canard River, believed to be area where Montague was wrecked

In recent years considerable effort has been made to locate the wreck of the Montague which is thought to lie near the Wellington Dyke on the Habitant River. The heavily sedimented and low-energy wreck site along the Habitant River may have preserved and also buried the wreck. A search led by the Kings County Museum under a heritage research permit in 2013 failed to locate the wreck although it did bring to light new information about the vessel and its role in 18th Century Nova Scotia.
