= Scots Bay, Nova Scotia =

Community in Nova Scotia, Canada

Coordinates: 45°18′2″N 64°23′42″W

Scots Bay in Nova Scotia

Scots Bay, also spelled "Scott's Bay" and "Scotts Bay," is a community in the Canadian province of Nova Scotia, located in Kings County.

== Name Origin ==
The debate on how to spell the name of this seaside village is as old as the community; a mysterious folklore to some. Settled in 1764, two stories emerged about the name, neither confirmed by first-hand records. Both agree that, prior to 1763, a ship ran aground and that the passengers overwintered with the aid of the local Mi'Kmaq people. Recent research has suggested that the Scottish "settlers" were James Yuill and his son, natives of Glasgow, who were stranded in a winter storm while ferrying supplies to the struggling new settlement of Onslow. Another story purports that the area was named after Captain Scott, which has evidence that includes the records of a Captain Scott in the area at the time, that the original postmaster records indicate the area was named after Captain Scott, and the majority of deep-rooted residents support this spelling as indicated in a petition from August 5, 2003, sent to the Member of the Legislative Assembly, Burt Greene, at the time from members of the community which demonstrated 80% of voters supported "Scott's" as the correct spelling. The History of Kings County, attributes the name to a story of an ill-fated ship that carried Scottish settlers to the Advocate and Cape D'Or region. There were Scottish settlers in Advocate and Cape D'Or at the time. The sign for the community entrance clearly indicates it is "Scotts Bay". Overall, the given name of this small seaside village is further confused as the Provincial signs state a combination of "Scott's Bay," "Scotts Bay," and "Scots Bay" and online maps all indicate "Scots Bay." Ed Coleman, a popular local historian, concluded the name must be Scots Bay.

== History ==
Areas, such as Clam Cove and Davison Cove have been explored by archaeologists due to evidence of ancient Mi'Kmaq arrow head manufacturing sites. Many residents report finding arrowheads in their gardens.

The first European settlers worked mainly in the fishing, farming, logging and shipbuilding industries. An archaeological survey in 2004 documented 14 mills and three shipyards that operated at Scots Bay. At least 26 sailing vessels were produced at Scots Bay including 15 large square rigged ocean-going merchant ships. The last schooner to be built in the community was the three masted schooner Huntley in 1918. Farming, fishing, and logging are still active industries in Scott's/Scots Bay, with the addition of tourism.

Scott's/Scots Bay has become the center of local controversy in late 2013, when it was announced that an American company called Halcyon proposed to build a large-scale tidal power barrage from Cape Split to Baxter's Harbour. As early as 1916, companies have been documenting interest in harnessing the powerful forces of the tides at Scott's/Scots Bay.

The bestselling historical novel The Birth House by Ami McKay is set in this community, where McKay and her family currently reside.

== Environment ==
Scott's/Scots Bay is home to Cape Split, a renowned hiking trail, cliffs, and Provincial Nature Preserve. Some of the world's highest tides, with a tidal difference of up to 44 feet, occur there. This is due to being directly connected to the Bay of Fundy. There are several species of protected and endangered species of plants and animals in the village and surrounding areas. The list includes several endangered varieties of bats, the Barn Swallow, the Canada Warbler, the Ram's Head Lady Slipper, and more. Other notable local wildlife include; Canada geese, loons, coyotes, white tail deer, and bald eagles. Black bear sightings are extremely rare and tend to occur on the southern slope of the Scott's Bay crescent.

The beach and cliff sides are known for semi-precious gemstones, primarily varieties of agate, quartz, and amethyst. These stones can be found lying on the surface of the pebble beach. Rock collectors, hikers and climbers make up a significant portion of the area's annual tourism, estimated at total of 40,000 visitors per year.
