= Charles Lawrence (British Army officer) =

British Army officer (1709–1760)

Brigadier-General Charles Lawrence
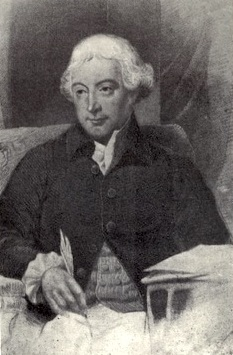
- Born: 14 December 1709; Plymouth, England
- Died: 19 October 1760 (aged 50); Halifax, Nova Scotia
- Military career
- Allegiance: Great Britain
- Branch: British Army
- Rank: Brigadier-General
- Conflicts: War of the Austrian Succession; Battle of Fontenoy; Father Le Loutre's War; Battle at Chignecto; French and Indian War; Battle of Fort Beausejour; Expulsion of the Acadians; Siege of Louisbourg
- Other work: Governor of Nova Scotia

Brigadier-General Charles Lawrence (14 December 1709 – 19 October 1760) was a British Army officer who, as lieutenant governor and subsequently governor of Nova Scotia, is perhaps best known for overseeing the Expulsion of the Acadians and settling the New England Planters in Nova Scotia. He was born in Plymouth, England, and died in Halifax, Nova Scotia. According to historian Elizabeth Griffiths, Lawrence was seen as a "competent", "efficient" officer with a "service record that had earned him fairly rapid promotion, a person of considerable administrative talent who was trusted by both Cornwallis and Hopson." He is buried in the crypt of St. Paul's Church (Halifax).

== Early career ==
Lawrence was born in Plymouth (Devon) on 14 December 1709. He followed his father, General Charles John Lawrence, who is said to have served in Flanders under John Churchill, 1st Duke of Marlborough, into a military career.

Charles Lawrence's earlier life is obscure. He was commissioned in the 11th Regiment of Foot and served in the West Indies from 1733 until 1737. He then served in the War Office. He was made lieutenant in 1731 and then captain in 1745. He was wounded while serving with the 54th Foot in the Battle of Fontenoy in 1745.

== Father Le Loutre's War ==
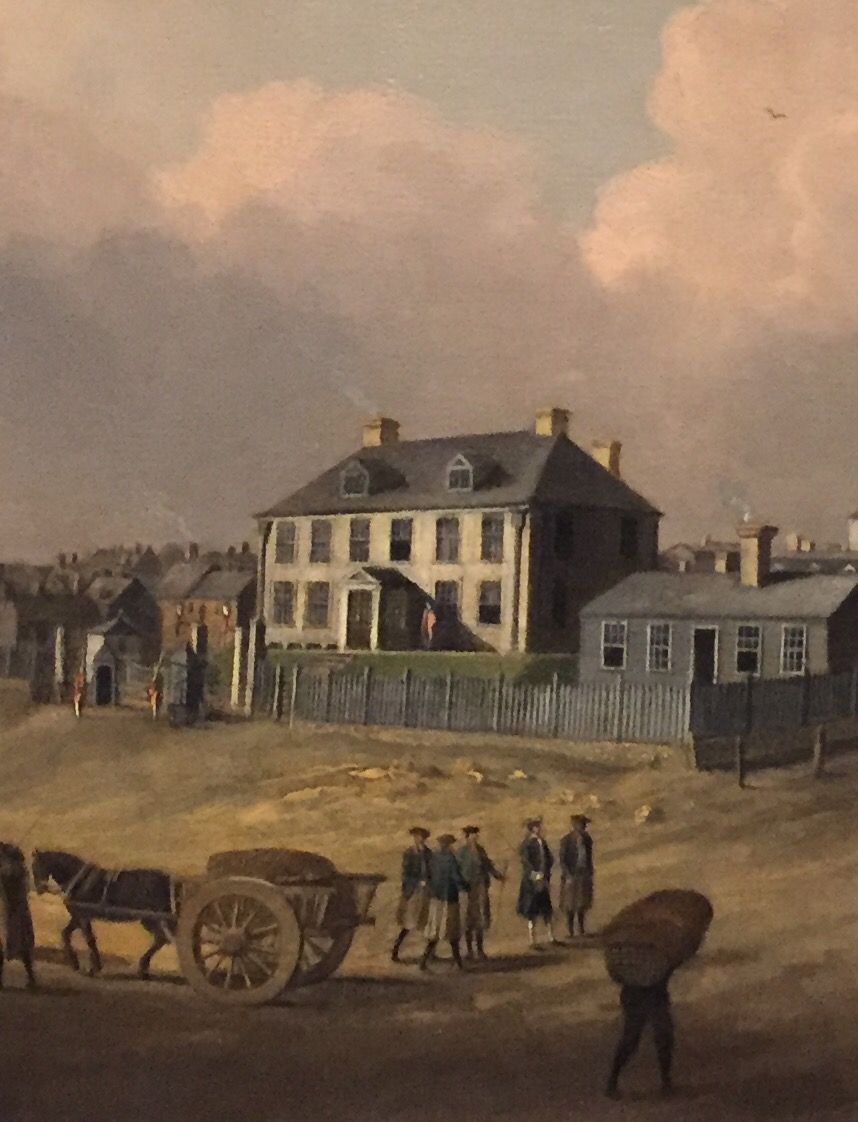
Governor Lawrence's residence (built 1749). (Located on the site of Province House, which still is furnished with his Nova Scotia Council table)

During Father Le Loutre's War, in 1749 he transferred again, to the 40th Foot. He participated in the Battle at Chignecto (1749) and then built Fort Lawrence on the south bank of the Missaguash River in the fall of 1750, and was promoted lieutenant-colonel the same year. In 1753, he directed the settlement of the Foreign Protestants at Lunenburg, Nova Scotia, and suppressed the settlers' rebellion there. Lawrence mobilized rangers to prevent the Acadian Exodus as well as fight the Mi'kmaq.

== French and Indian War ==
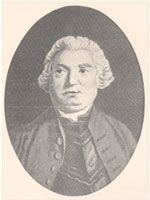
Governor Lawrence (1753)

During the French and Indian War, in conjunction with Governor William Shirley of Massachusetts, he helped raise forces for the Battle of Fort Beauséjour on 16 June 1755. He wrote the deportation order, and orchestrated the various campaigns of the Expulsion of the Acadians, beginning with the Bay of Fundy Campaign (1755). After the native Raid on Lunenburg (1756), he placed a bounty on male native scalps.

Lawrence commissioned several armed patrol vessels to patrol the Nova Scotia coast as part of a provincial marine, including the ten-gun brigantine Montague in 1759.

As governor of Nova Scotia, Lawrence saw the settlement of the Acadian lands by New England Planters. In 1757, Lawrence was further promoted to the title of brigadier general and commanded one of the three divisions at the successful siege of the French fortress at Louisbourg on Île Royale (Cape Breton Island) in 1758.

He is said to have died of pneumonia in 1760 in Halifax, Nova Scotia and is buried under St. Paul's Church (Halifax).

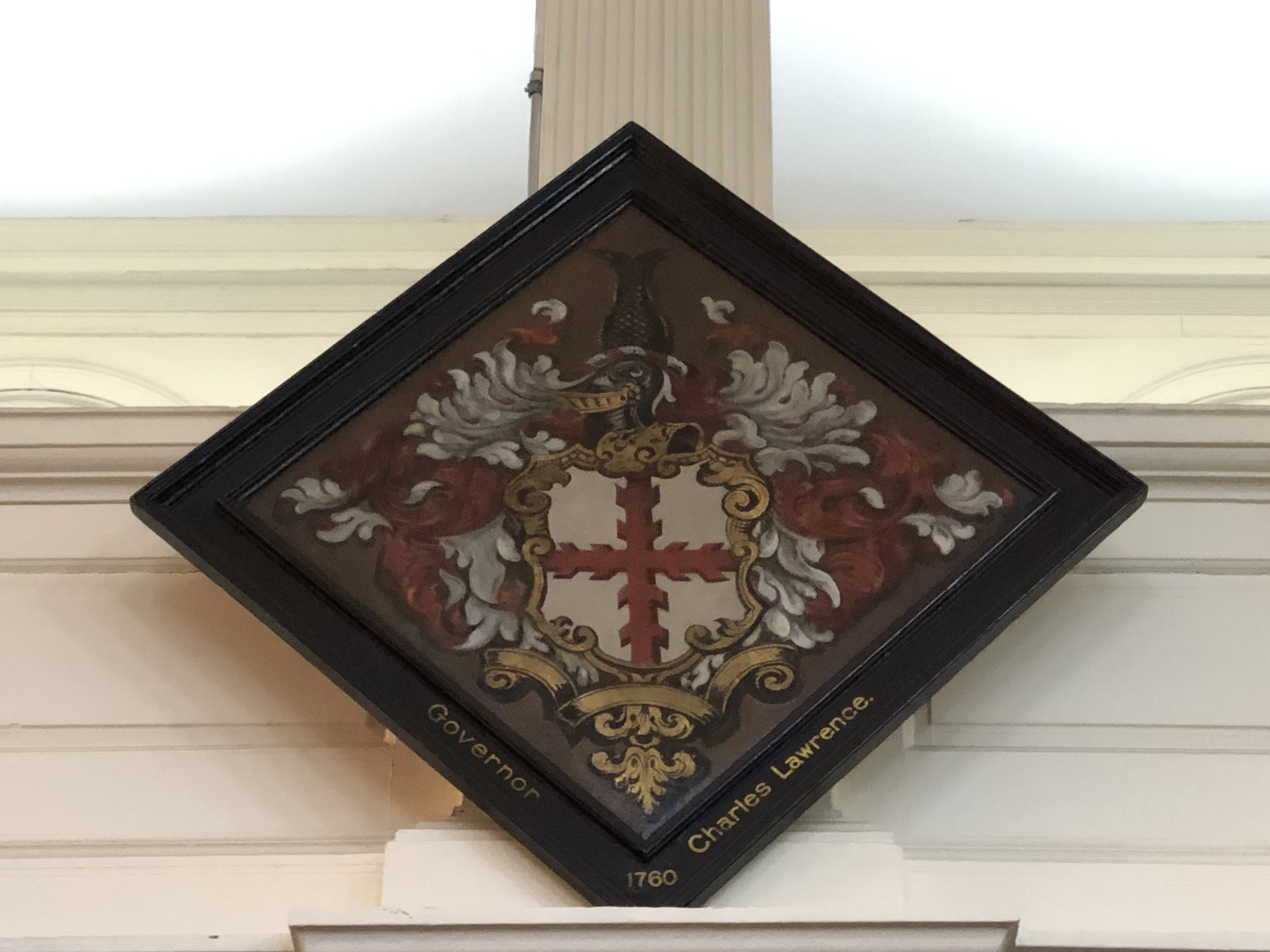
Charles Lawrence hatchment, St. Paul's Church, Halifax, Nova Scotia

According to his biographer, Dominique Graham,

Referring to the monument raised to Lawrence’s memory in St Paul’s Church, Halifax, to indicate the late governor’s popularity, Belcher wrote, "In a grateful sense of his affection and services the last tribute that could be paid to his memory was unanimously voted by the General Assembly at their first meeting after the late Governor’s universally lamented decease." These sympathetic remarks by a contemporary with whom Lawrence had sometimes been at odds and the considerations mentioned above should be placed in the scales against the views of historians who condemn him for his inhumanity to the Acadians.

== Legacy ==
- He is the namesake of Fort Lawrence, Nova Scotia and Lawrencetown, Nova Scotia, and Lawrence Street in Lunenburg
- He is the namesake of a British privateer Lawrence

== See also ==
- Military history of Nova Scotia
- Military history of the Mi’kmaq People
- Military history of the Acadians

Political offices
Preceded by Paul Mascarene	Lieutenant Governor of Nova Scotia; 1753–1755; Served under: Peregrine Hopson	Succeeded by Jonathan Belcher
Preceded by Peregrine Hopson	Governor of Nova Scotia; 1755-1760	Succeeded by Henry Ellis
