= Alexander Murray (British Army officer, died 1762) =

British Army officer (1715–1762)

- Military career
- Allegiance: Kingdom of Great Britain
- Branch: British Army
- Commands: 45th Regiment of Foot
- Conflicts: Father Le Loutre's War; French and Indian War

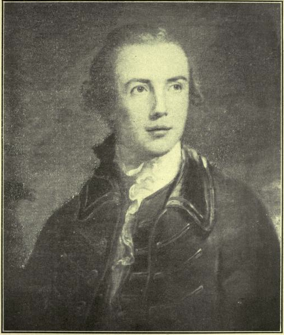
Captain Alexander Murray, commander of the 45th Regiment of Foot

Alexander Murray (c. 1715 – 1762) was a British Army officer who served in Father Le Loutre's War and the French and Indian War in Nova Scotia. He was the cousin of James Murray.

== See also ==
- Military history of Nova Scotia

== Links ==
- Portrait of Murray as a child
