= Cobequid =

Coordinates: 45°20′45″N 63°45′27″W

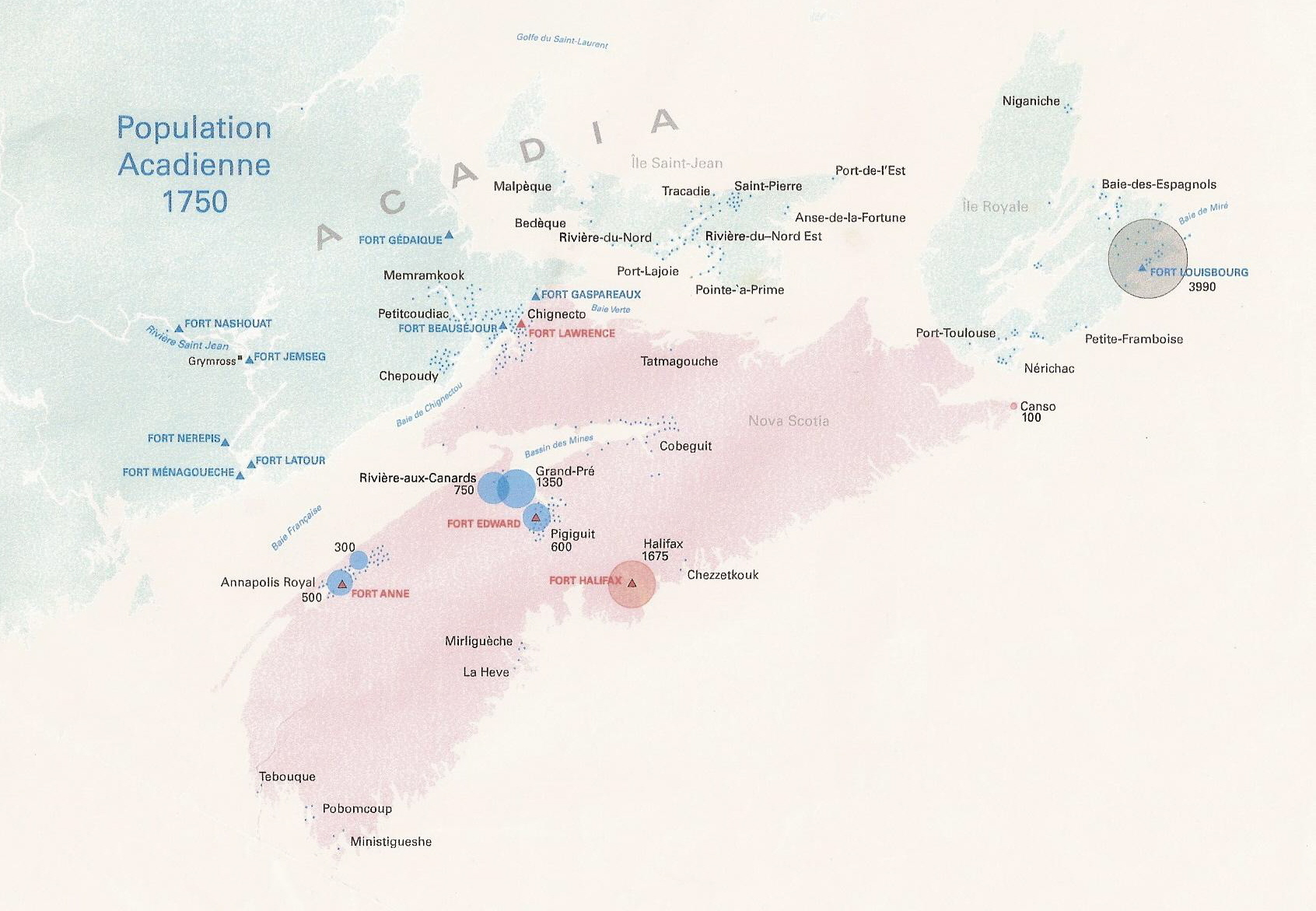
Population of Cobequid in 1750

The old name Cobequid was derived from the Mi'kmaq word "Wagobagitk" meaning "the bay runs far up", in reference to the area surrounding the easternmost inlet of the Minas Basin in Nova Scotia, Canada, a body of water called Cobequid Bay.

Cobequid was granted in 1689 to Mathieu Martin. He was said to be the first Acadian born in Acadia.

In 1705, the Acadians first settled in this area near Cobequid Bay. The Acadian culture consisted primarily of farming. Their advanced farming systems of dykes permitted them to recuperate valuable farmland from the marshlands that cover the entire coast of the community. The community, which is now called Masstown, is located 10 minutes west of Truro on Highway 2 or Exit 12 off Highway 104.

In 1714, many inhabitants of Minas signed to a resolution, dated 9 September 1714, to go to Cape Breton. Many came from Cobequid, Grand-Pré, Riviere des Gasparots (Gaspareaux), Riviere de Pessequid, Riviere des Habitants, and Riviere de la Vieille Habitation.

In August 1744, a certain Acadian by the name of Duvivier came to Cobequid with supplies from other Acadian villages.

The Cobequid Acadians were close to an Indian mission located where the Stewiacke meets the Shubenacadie; and which had been run, for many years, by Le Loutre. In January 1750, Le Loutre made an ever closer alliance with his native friends (the sworn allies of the French crown). This meant that the Acadians of Cobequid did not want to get too friendly with the English.

On the second day of September, 1755, the French inhabitants of Cobequid Village, lying on the north side of the bay, were working in their fields because it was harvest time. Three British vessels came into the Bay. Two of them anchored, one opposite the Village, and the other at Lower Cobequid; while the third went further up the shore. On 4 September, they placed a notice on the church, that read that all their belonging now belong to His Majesty. However, this order had been given by William Shirley, Governor of Massachusetts and commander-in-chief of North American forces, and not by the British government in London. This was William Shirley's revenge for the death of his son during Edward Braddock campaign against the Canadiens in the Ohio Valley. This was the beginning of the Acadian deportation.
