= New England Planters =

Settlers from New England who moved to Nova Scotia

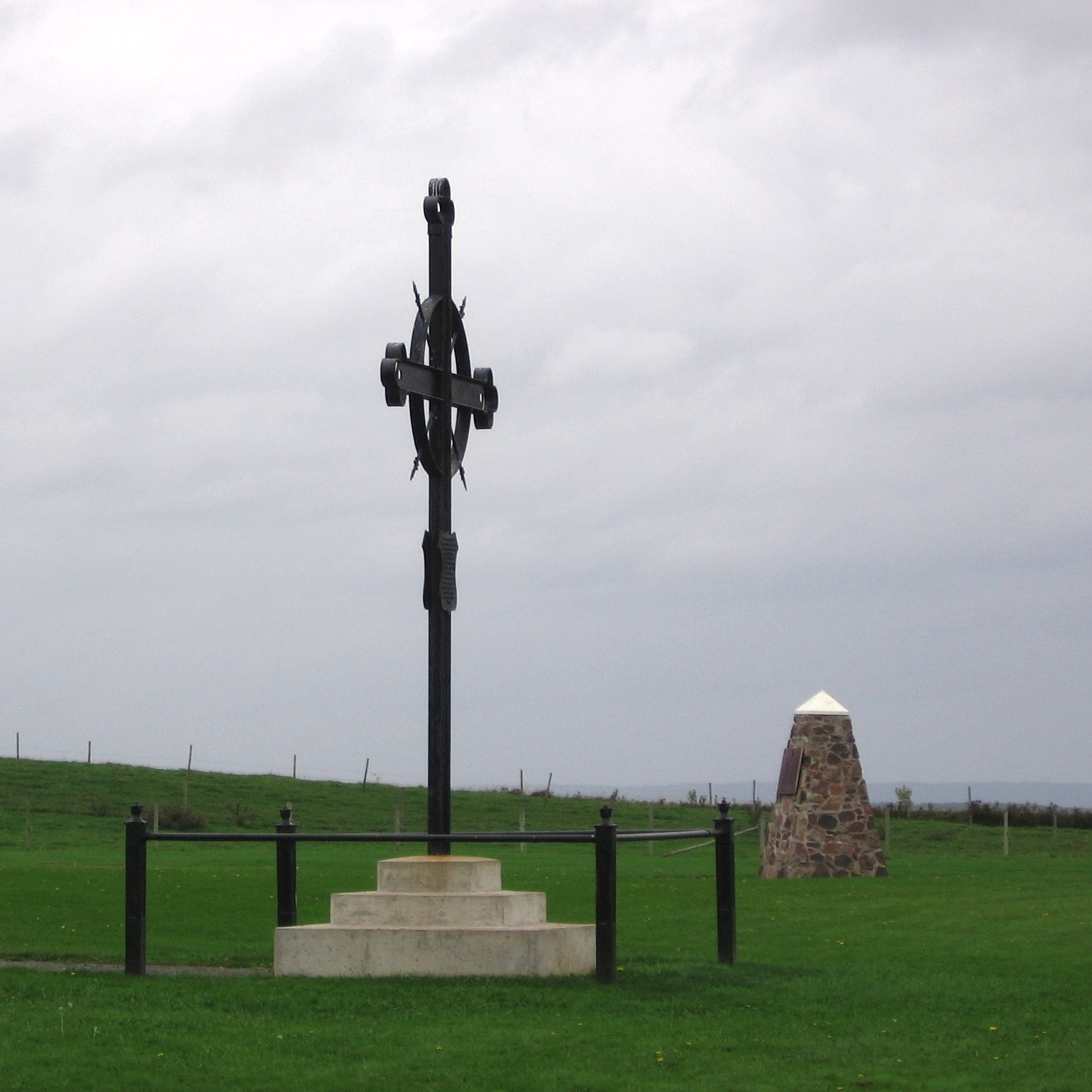
Acadian Memorial Cross and the New England Planters Monument, Hortonville, Nova Scotia

The New England Planters were settlers from the New England colonies who responded to invitations by the lieutenant governor (and subsequently governor) of Nova Scotia, Charles Lawrence, to settle lands left vacant by the Bay of Fundy Campaign (1755) of the Acadian Expulsion.

== History ==
8,000 planters (roughly 2,000 families), largely farmers and fishermen, arrived from 1759 to 1768 to take up the offer. The farmers settled mainly on the rich farmland of the Annapolis Valley and in the southern counties of what is now New Brunswick but was then part of Nova Scotia. Most of the fishermen went to the South Shore of Nova Scotia, where they got the same amount of land as the farmers. Many fishermen wanted to move there, especially since they were already fishing off the Nova Scotia coast.

The movement of some 2,000 families from New England to Nova Scotia in the early 1760s was a small part of the much larger migration of the estimated 66,000 who moved to New York's Mohawk River Valley, to New Hampshire, and to what later became the states of Vermont and Maine. From 1760 to 1775, some 54 new towns were established in Vermont, 100 in New Hampshire, 94 in Maine, and 14 in Nova Scotia. Land scarcity was the principal cause and free land the attraction, but the defeat of French power in North America, achieved in 1758 to 1760, explains the timing.

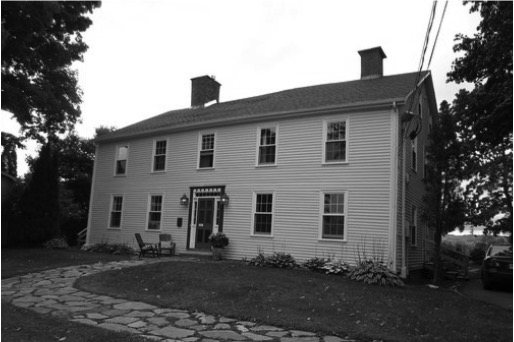
Planters' Barracks, Starr's Point, Nova Scotia

The Planters were the first major group of English-speaking immigrants in Canada who did not come directly from Great Britain. Most of the Planters were Protestant Congregationalists, in contrast to the largely-Catholic Acadians.

The Planters in the Annapolis Valley revived the dykeland agriculture, which had been created by the Acadians in the Annapolis Valley and later expanded it with ambitious projects like the Wellington Dyke. The Planters were soon joined by Ulster and Yorkshire emigrants from Britain and United Empire Loyalists, who left New York and the New England colonies after the American War of Independence in 1783.

The latter influxes greatly diminished the Planter political influence in Nova Scotia. However, the Planters laid the foundations of many still-existing communities of Nova Scotia and New Brunswick, and their political and religious traditions (see Henry Alline) had important influences on the culture of the region. In Nova Scotia, the New England Planters inspired the provincial nickname of "Bluenoser," as the term was first used to distinguish Planter candidates from Loyalist candidates in elections after the American Revolution.

The Planters have been the subject of considerable scholarly research in recent years, which has been led by a series of Planters Studies conferences at Acadia University in Wolfville, Nova Scotia. They are also commemorated by a Parks Canada exhibit at the Kings County Museum in Kentville, Nova Scotia.

== Notable people ==
- Robert Denison
- Henry Alline
- Samuel Starr
- Gamaliel Smethurst

== See also ==
- Planters and Pioneers
