= Nova Scotia Route 221 =

Highway in Nova Scotia, Canada

Route 221

Route information
- Maintained by Nova Scotia Department of Transportation and Infrastructure Renewal
- Length: 63 km (39 mi)

Major junctions
- West end: Route 362 in Spa Springs
- East end: Medford Road in Kingsport

Location
- Country: Canada
- Province: Nova Scotia
- Counties: Annapolis / Kings

Highway system
- Provincial highways in Nova Scotia; 100-series
← Route 219	→ Route 223

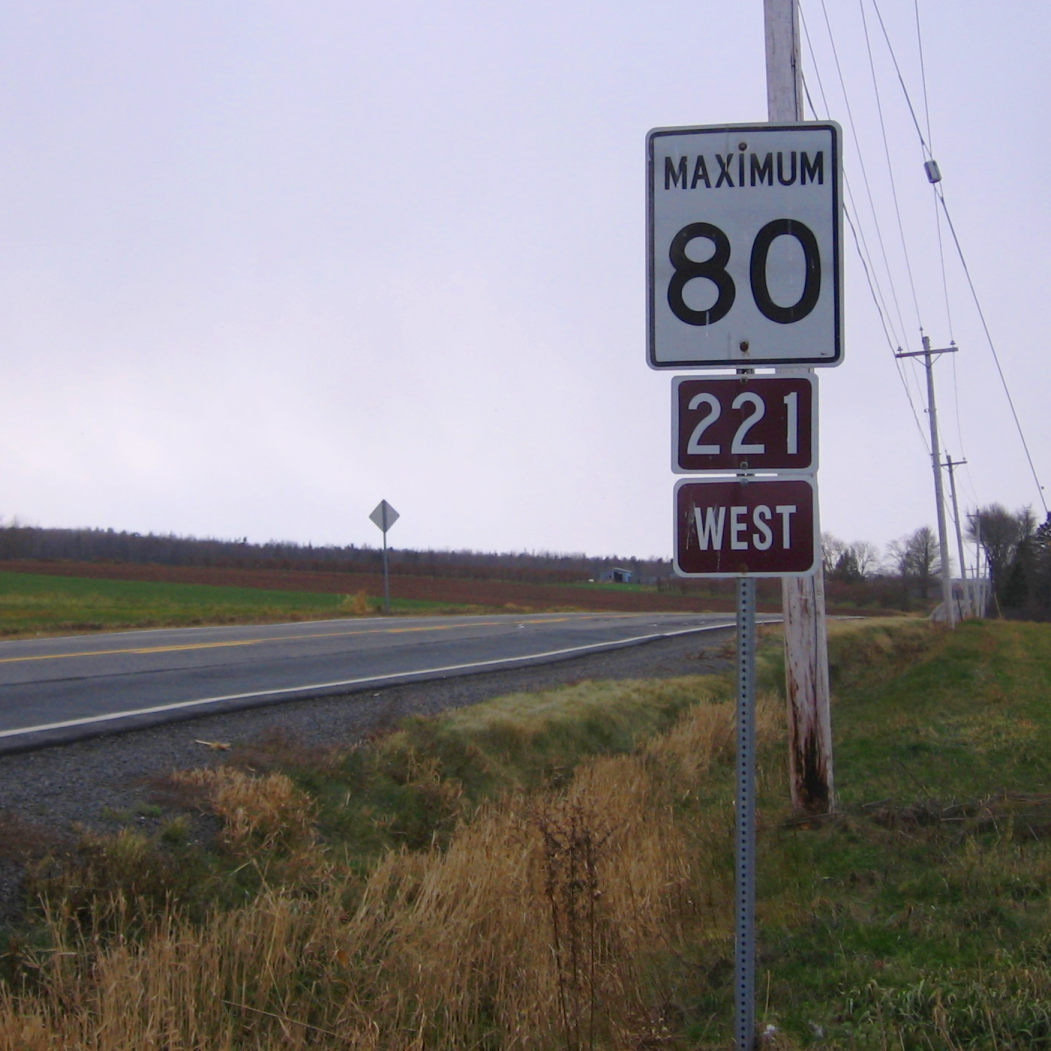
Nova Scotia Route 221, not far from Brooklyn Street

Route 221 is a collector road in the Canadian province of Nova Scotia.

It is located in Kings County and Annapolis County in the Annapolis Valley and connects Kingsport to Spa Springs.

Valley residents informally refer to Route 221 as the "Back Road", since it runs parallel to Trunk 1, but instead of running through the centre of the valley, it runs close to the less-populated southern base of the North Mountain.

== Communities ==
- Kingsport
- Habitant
- Canning
- Sheffield Mills
- Gibson Woods
- Centreville
- Billtown
- Lakeville
- Woodville
- Kinsmans Corners
- Grafton
- Buckleys Corner
- Welsford
- Dempseys Corner
- Weltons Corner
- North Kingston
- Spa Springs

== History ==
The section of Collector Highway 221 from Canning to Kingsport was once designated as part of the Trunk Highway 41.

== See also ==
- List of Nova Scotia provincial highways
