= Blomidon, Nova Scotia =

Community in Nova Scotia, Canada

Coordinates: 45°13′6″N 64°22′21″W

Blomidon in Nova Scotia

Blomidon (/ˈblɒmɪdɒn/ BLOM-ih-don) is a community in the Canadian province of Nova Scotia, located in Kings County on the Blomidon Peninsula near Cape Blomidon. The community is home to Blomidon Provincial Park, a campground with a 13.5 kilometer hiking trail system.

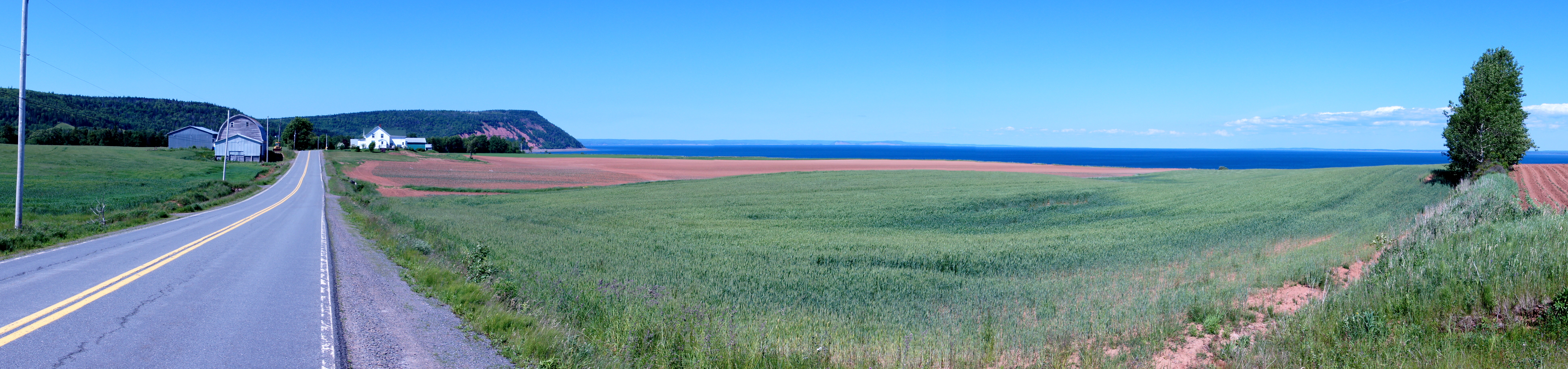
Road leading to Blomidon Provincial Park.
