= Nova Scotia Route 362 =

Highway in Nova Scotia, Canada

Route 362

Route information
- Maintained by Nova Scotia Department of Transportation and Infrastructure Renewal
- Length: 47 km (29 mi)

Major junctions
- South end: Trunk 1 in Middleton
- Hwy 101 in Middleton
- North end: Stronach Mountain Road in East Margaretsville

Location
- Country: Canada
- Province: Nova Scotia

Highway system
- Provincial highways in Nova Scotia; 100-series
← Route 360	→ Route 366

Route 362 is a collector road in the Canadian province of Nova Scotia.

It is located in Annapolis County and connects Middleton at Trunk 1 with East Margaretsville.

== Communities ==
- Middleton
- Spa Springs
- Victoria Vale
- Margaretsville
- East Margaretsville

== See also ==
- List of Nova Scotia provincial highways
