= Cape Blomidon =

Headland in Nova Scotia, Canada

Coordinates: 45°17′43″N 64°19′55″W

Cape Blomidon in Nova Scotia

Cape Blomidon (/ˈblɒmɪdɒn/ BLOM-ih-don) is a headland located on the Bay of Fundy coast of the Canadian province of Nova Scotia.

== Location ==
Cape Blomidon is located in Kings County at the northeast edge of the Blomidon Peninsula. Its geology largely comprises sedimentary sandstone, which is unique since it is connected to the North Mountain range and made up of tholeiitic basalt. Cape Blomidon features distinctive reddish-coloured cliffs that reach up to 100 metres in height above the Minas Basin, which stretches out to the east. Cape Split is the geologic continuation of the North Mountain range and juts off the Blomidon Peninsula to the northwest. According to Mi'kmaq legend, Cape Blomidon is the home of Glooscap.

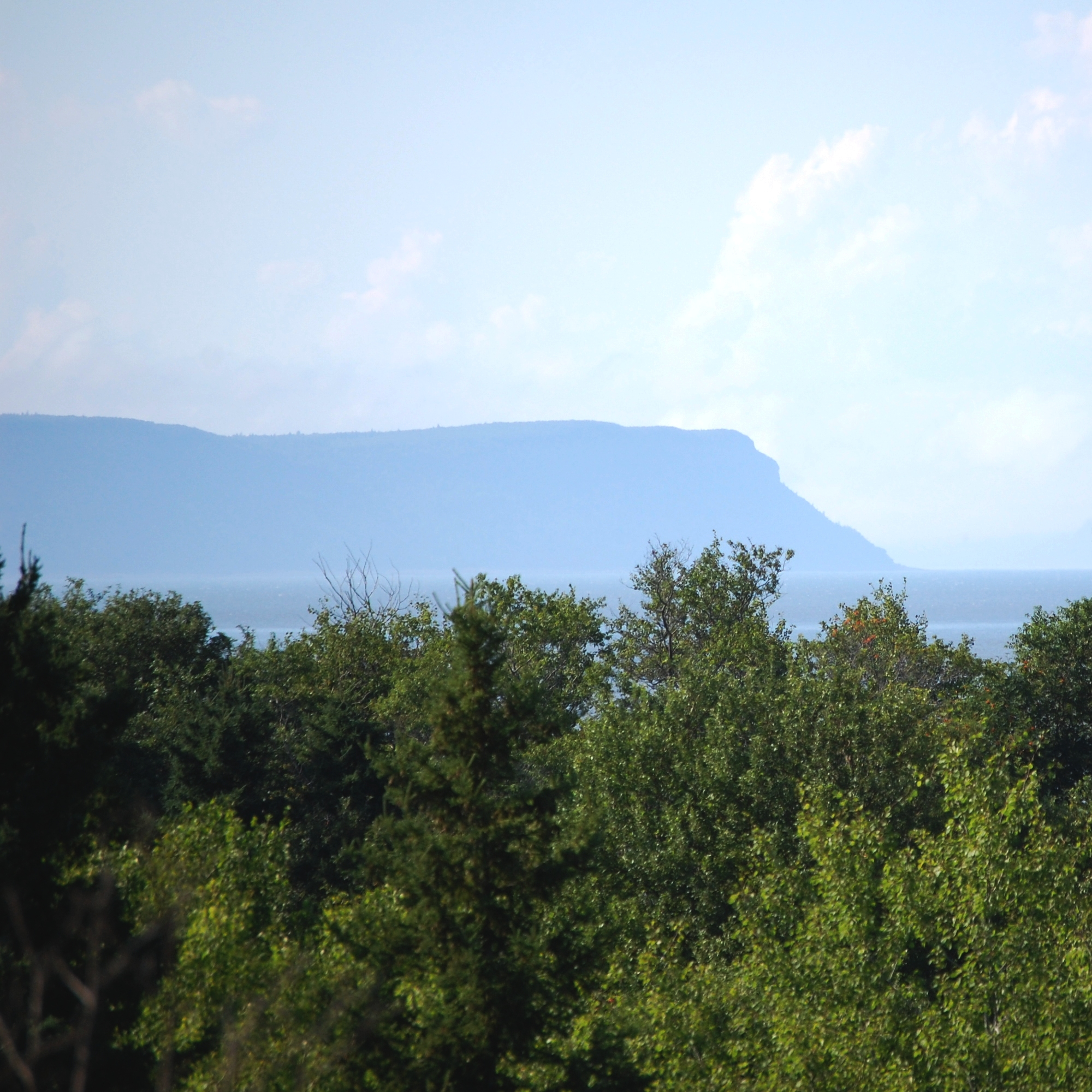
Cape Blomidon

The cape and much of the coastal area of the Blomidon Peninsula are protected by Blomidon Provincial Park. Visitor access to this park is located at the southern edge of the peninsula, approximately 3.5 kilometres south of Cape Blomidon.

The name "Cape Blomidon" was officially approved on October 1, 1959, although the name had been in use many years beforehand. French explorer Samuel de Champlain called the cape Cap Poutrincourt and local Acadian settlers called it Cap Baptiste. English speaking settlers called it Cape Porcupine. However, the common term used was Cape Blowmedown, from which "Blomidon" is derived.

It is the subject of Blomidon, a poem by Charles G. D. Roberts.

The Battle of Blomindon happened here during the American Revolution.
