= Annapolis Valley Regional Library =

Public library system based in Annapolis Valley, Canada

- Location: Annapolis County, Kings County and the district of West Hants, Nova Scotia, Canada
- Established: 1949
- Branches: 11 (2014)

Collection
- Size: 190,143 (2015)

Access and use
- Circulation: 619,220 (2014)
- Population served: 101,000 (2014)

Other information
- Website: http://www.valleylibrary.ca/

Annapolis Valley Regional Library (AVRL) is a public library system based in Annapolis Valley, Nova Scotia, Canada. It serves a population of just over 101,000 in Annapolis County, Kings County and the district of West Hants with eleven branch libraries. Established in 1949, Annapolis Valley Regional Library was the first regional library system in Nova Scotia.

== History ==
In 1937, the Government of Nova Scotia passed an Act to Provide for the Support of Regional Libraries and a survey was undertaken asking residents if they needed a public library in their community. The recommendation was made to implement regional library service. The Second World War stalled plans for library service, but after the war in 1947-1948 the survey was updated and work began on the long-awaited project to establish a regional library in the Annapolis Valley.

In May 1949, three branches were opened in Annapolis County — Annapolis Royal, Bridgetown, and Lawrencetown. Middleton opened a branch in September 1949, and then the Windsor and Wolfville branches opened in November 1949. In 1951 the Berwick branch was set up followed in 1954 by Kentville, Hantsport in 1957, Port Williams in 1958, and the Kingston branch in 1972.

== Governance ==
Annapolis Valley Regional Library is governed by a Board of Directors. It is composed of appointed members from each of the eleven municipal units served by the region and two representatives appointed by the Province of Nova Scotia.

== Services ==
Annapolis Valley Regional Library offers:

- Collection of 190, 143 items including books, magazines, CDs, DVDs, etc.
- Downloadable eBooks and audiobooks
- Free Public Internet access and wireless internet access
- Borrow by Mail outreach service
- Programs for kids, teens and adults

== Branches ==
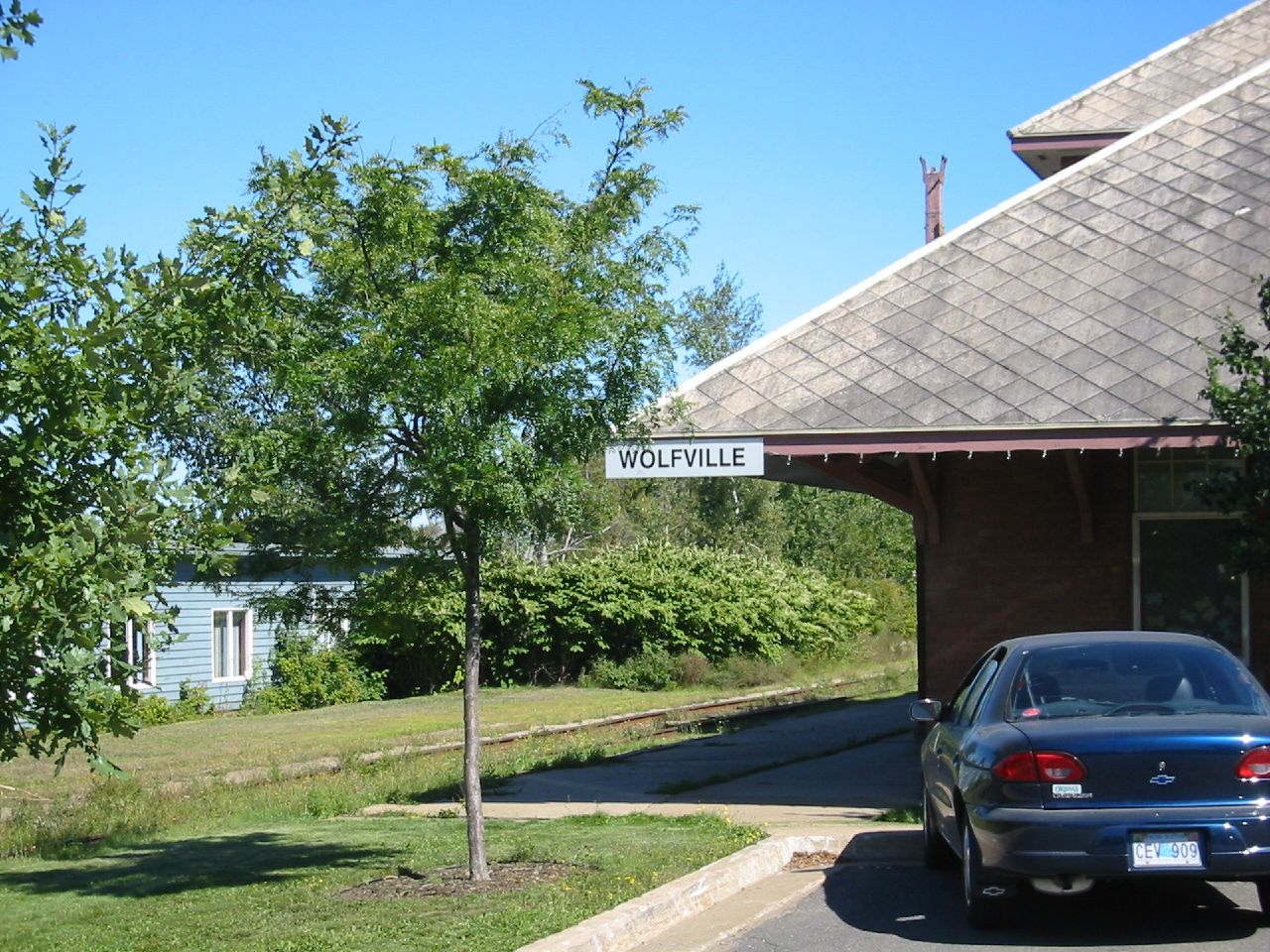
The Wolfville Memorial Library, housed in a former station of the Dominion Atlantic Railway

| Name | Area | Opened | Coordinates |
|---|---|---|---|
| Annapolis Royal Library | Annapolis Royal | 1994 | 44.743068°N 65.519574°W |
| Berwick Library | Berwick | 1993 | 45.046680°N 64.735893°W |
| Bridgetown & Area Library | Bridgetown | 2011 | 44.839933°N 65.290947°W |
| Isabel & Roy Jodrey Memorial Library | Hantsport | 2015 | 45.065410°N 64.179694°W |
| Kentville Library | Kentville | 1987 | 45.076905°N 64.497454°W |
| Kingston Library | Kingston | 1996 | 44.988580°N 64.946932°W |
| Dr. Frank W. Morse Memorial Library | Lawrencetown | 2002 | 44.882901°N 65.158568°W |
| Rosa M. Harvey Middleton & Area Library | Middleton | 2003 | 44.943872°N 65.073381°W |
| Murdoch C. Smith Memorial Library | Port Williams | 1958 | 45.098667°N 64.411048°W |
| Windsor Regional Library | Windsor | 2004 | 44.991305°N 64.137834°W |
| Wolfville Memorial Library | Wolfville | 1993 | 45.092655°N 64.363460°W |
