= Trina Roache =

Mi'kmaq video journalist

Trina Roache is a Mi'kmaw video journalist, educated at University of King's College. She has worked with CBC, as a freelancer and with APTN National News at the Aboriginal Peoples Television Network covering the issues and stories of the Mi’kmaq, Wolastoqiyik and Peskotomuhkati people in the Atlantic Canada. She is a member of the Glooscap First Nation.

She is now a professor at the University of King's College and also a research fellow at the MacEachen Institute for Public Policy and Governance at Dalhousie University.

Her daughter is Danica Roache, an award-winning author.

== Awards and honors ==
In 2014 Roache won the Journalists for Human Rights (JHR)/Canadian Association of Journalists (CAJ) Award for Human Rights Reporting at the annual awards of the CAJ. Her winning story Outside the Circle looked at Indigenous families struggling to use the provisions of "Jordan's Principle", a Canadian policy aimed at ensuring Indigenous children with special needs receive adequate health care. Jordan’s Principle passed as a unanimous motion by Canada's House of Commons. Roache's piece demonstrated that far from solving the issue Indigenous children requiring special medical attention on reserve continue to get lost in jurisdictional squabbles between Canada's federal government and the provinces, and families often find themselves battling for help in the courts.
