= Northville, Nova Scotia =

Community in Nova Scotia, Canada

Coordinates: 45°8′48.97″N 64°33′50.05″W

Northville in Nova Scotia

Northville is a community in the Canadian province of Nova Scotia, located in Kings County.
