= Annapolis Valley First Nation Reserve =

- Indian reserve
- Annapolis Valley First Nation Reserve Annapolis Valley First Nation Reserve (Canada)
- Coordinates: 45°03′58″N 64°38′53″W
- Country: Canada
- Province: Nova Scotia

Annapolis Valley First Nation Reserve (formerly known as Cambridge 32) is a Miꞌkmaq reserve located in Kings County, Nova Scotia.

It is administratively part of the Annapolis Valley First Nation.
