= Brooklyn Street, Nova Scotia =

Community in Nova Scotia, Canada

Coordinates: 45°5′0.46″N 64°38′52.25″W

Brooklyn Street in Nova Scotia

Brooklyn Street is a community in the Canadian province of Nova Scotia, located in Kings County.
