= Blomidon Provincial Park =

Provincial park in Nova Scotia, Canada

Coordinates: 45°16′5.24″N 64°20′13.08″W

Blomidon Provincial Park in Nova Scotia

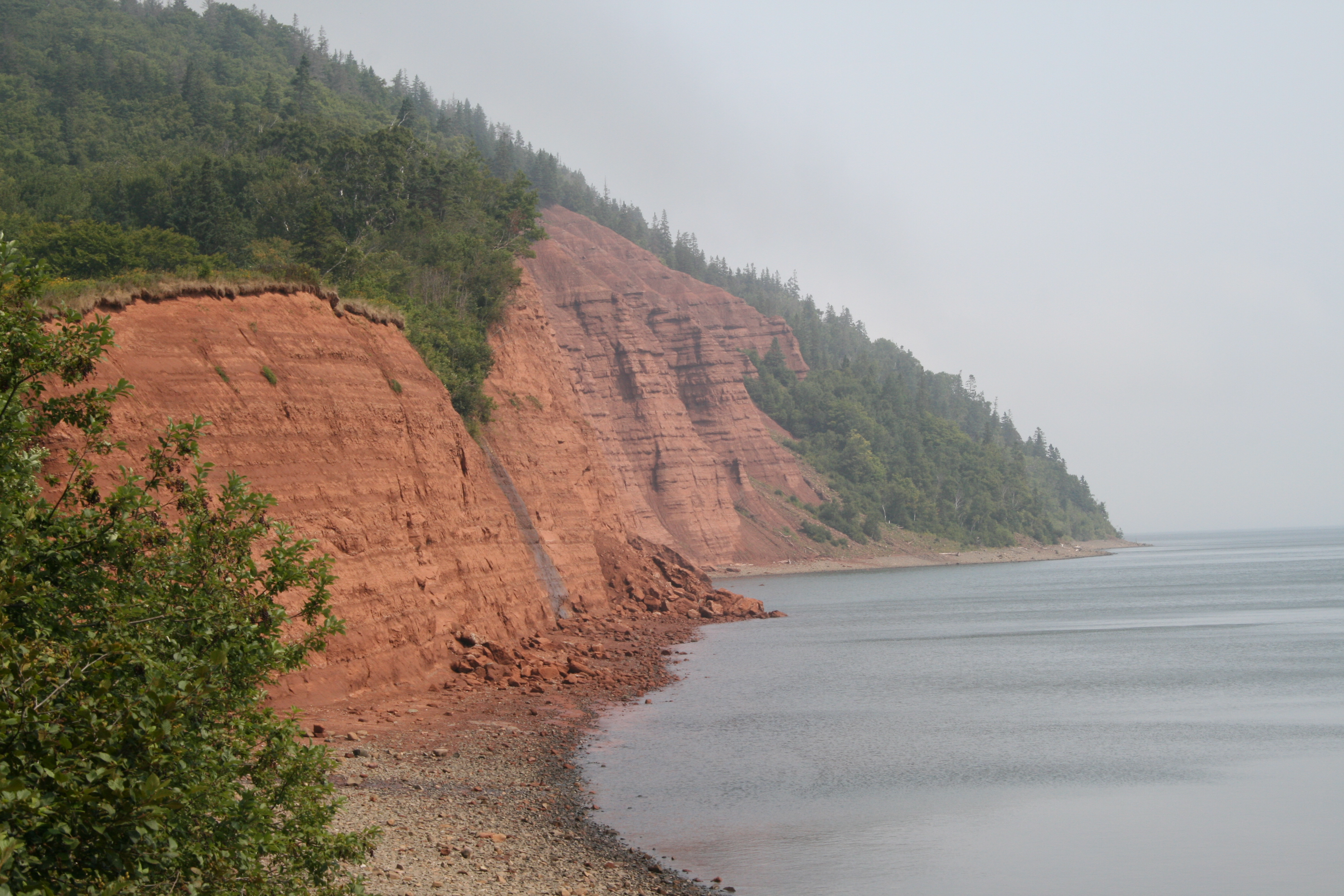
Cape Blomidon

Blomidon Provincial Park (/ˈblɒmɪdɒn/ BLOM-ih-don) is a camping and day-use provincial park located at Cape Blomidon on the shores of the Minas Basin in Nova Scotia, Canada. It is known for its hiking and for views over the world's highest tides. Blomidon is located on 1,875 acres (7.6 km^{2}) of land with 600 ft (180 m) high cliffs. It is accessible via Nova Scotia Route 358.

The park is open from mid-May to October, offering a 100-site campground (both field and woodland sites), two picnic areas, an unsupervised beach and hiking trails. A 14 km loop connects all of the hiking trails, with an interpretive trail, overlooks, and a waterfall.

Blomidon Provincial Park is located 20 km north of Wolfville, Nova Scotia and 100 km west of Halifax. Nearby attractions include the Annapolis Valley Apple Blossom Festival, the Fort Edward National Historic Site and Grand-Pré National Historic Site.

Cape Blomidon according to legend was the home of Mi'kmaq hero, Glooscap. Nearby First Nation community Glooscap First Nation is named in honour of this hero.
