= St. Croix 34 =

Coordinates: 44°54′2″N 64°4′5″W

St. Croix 34 in Nova Scotia

St. Croix 34 is a Mi'kmaq reserve located in Hants County, Nova Scotia.

It is administratively part of the Annapolis Valley First Nation.
