= Annapolis Valley =

Coordinates: 45°00′N 64°55′W

- Economic region
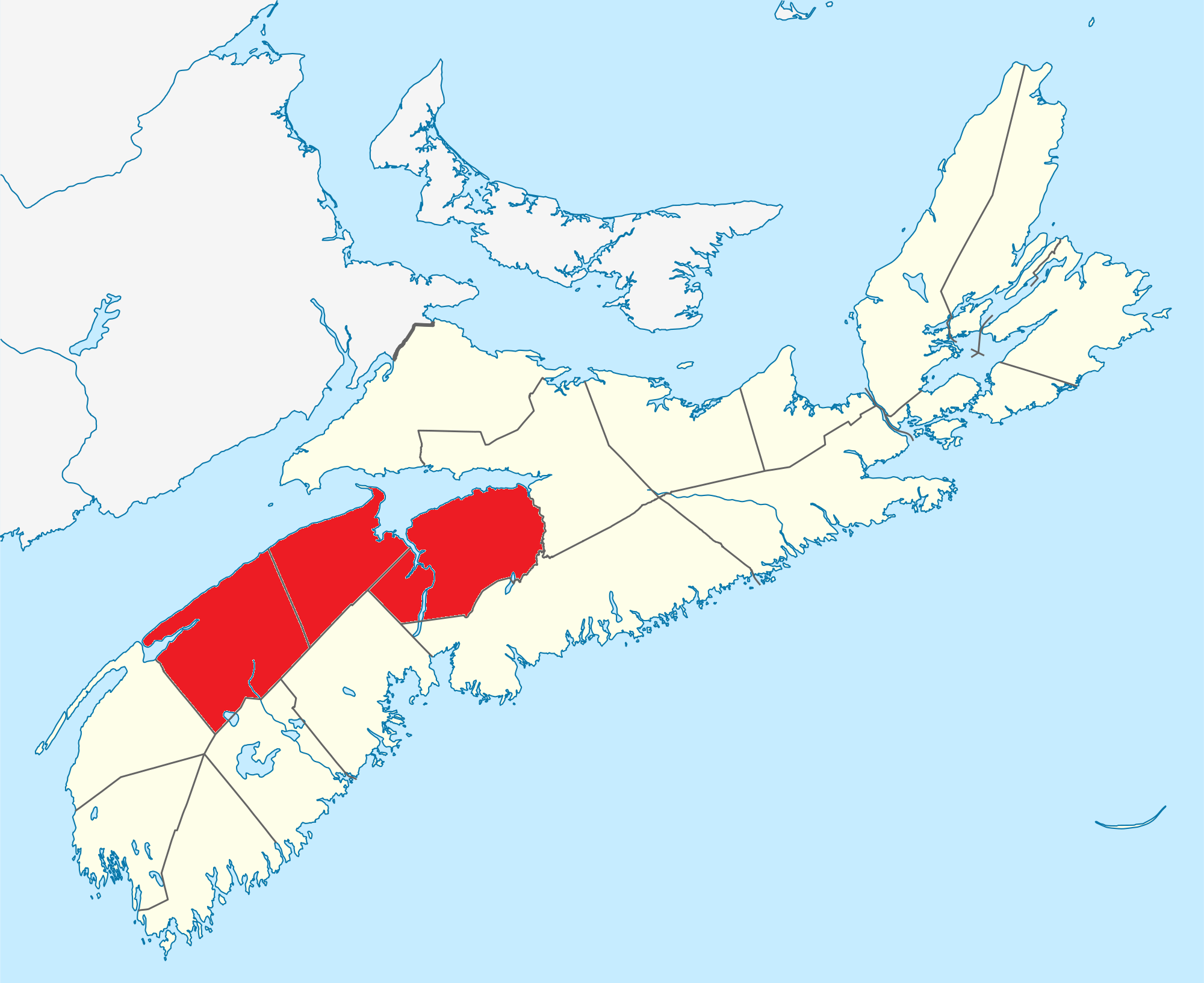
- The Annapolis Valley region as defined by Statistics Canada
- Country: Canada
- Province: Nova Scotia
- Counties: Annapolis County; Kings County; Hants County

Area
  - Land: 8,367.78 km^{2} (3,230.82 sq mi)

Population (2021)
  - Total: 129,306
  - Density: 15.5/km^{2} (40/sq mi)
  - Change 2016–21: ▲4.5%
- Time zone: UTC-4 (AST)
  - Summer (DST): UTC-3 (ADT)
- Area code: 902
- Dwellings: 62,284

The Annapolis Valley is a valley and region in the province of Nova Scotia, Canada. It is located in the western part of the Nova Scotia peninsula, formed by a trough between two parallel mountain ranges along the shore of the Bay of Fundy. Statistics Canada defines the Annapolis Valley as an economic region, composed of Annapolis County, Kings County, and Hants County.

== Geography ==
The valley measures approximately 126 kilometres (78 mi) in length from Annapolis Royal and the Annapolis Basin in the west to Wolfville and the Minas Basin in the east, spanning the counties of Digby, Annapolis and Kings.

Some also include the western part of Hants County, including the towns of Hantsport and Windsor even further to the east, but geographically speaking they are part of the Avon River valley.

The steep face of basaltic North Mountain shelters the valley from the adjacent Bay of Fundy and rises over 260 metres (850 ft) in elevation near Lawrencetown. The granitic South Mountain rises to a somewhat higher elevation and shelters the valley from the climate of the Atlantic Ocean approximately 100 kilometres further south on the province's South Shore.

The shelter provided by these two mountainous ridges has produced a microclimate which provides relatively mild temperatures for the region and, coupled with the fertile glacial sedimentary soils on the valley floor, the region is conducive to growing vegetable and fruit crops. Particularly famous for its apple crop, the valley hosts in excess of 1,000 farms of various types, the majority being relatively small family-owned operations.

Within the valley itself are two major rivers, the Annapolis River which flows west from Caribou Bog in the central part of the valley into Annapolis Basin, and the Cornwallis River which flows east from Caribou Bog into Minas Basin. The North Mountain ridge forms the north side of the Annapolis Valley. Also flowing east, in two smaller valleys north of the Cornwallis River, are the Canard River and the Habitant River, both of which also flow into the Minas Basin.

== History ==
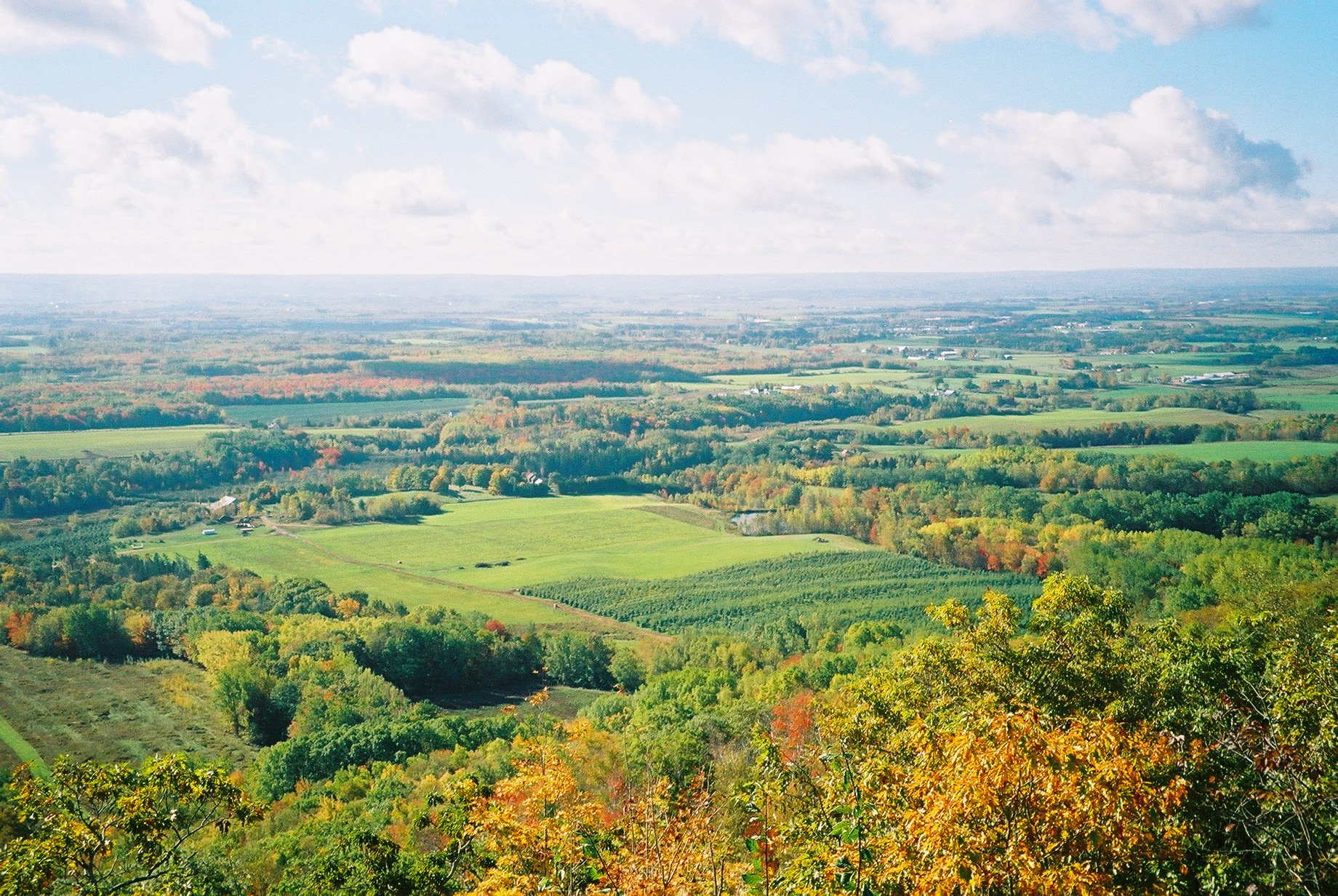
Annapolis Valley from North Mountain in Valleyview Provincial Park, north of Bridgetown

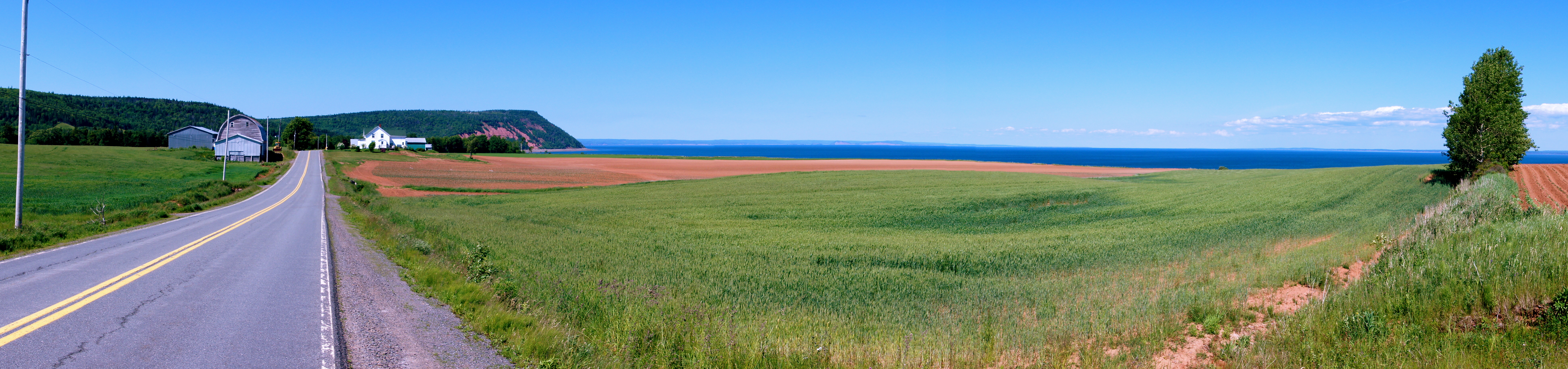
Eastern End, with the Minas Basin to the right

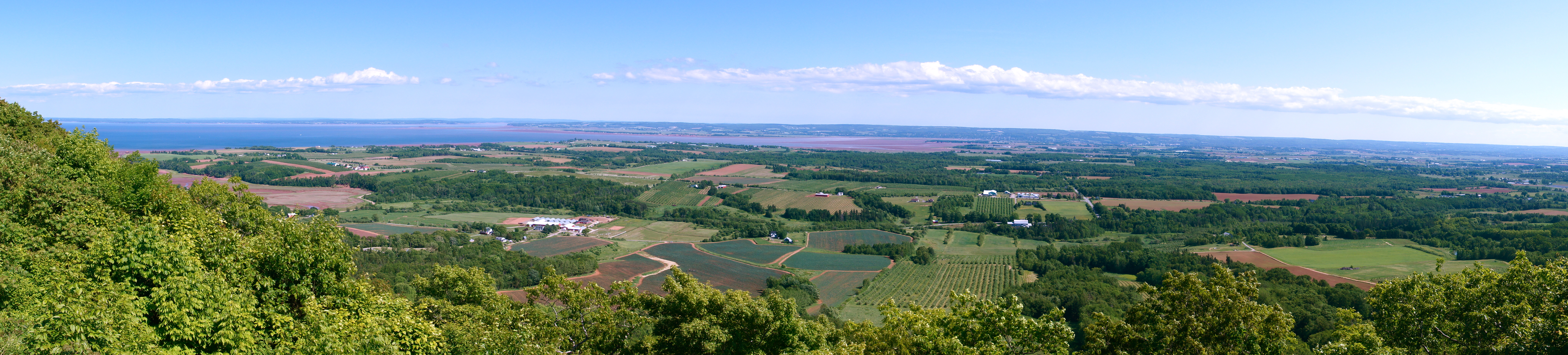
Eastern end looking southeast across Annapolis Valley from "The Lookoff", North Mountain

Long settled by the Mi'kmaq nation, the valley experienced French settlement at the Habitation at Port-Royal, near modern-day Annapolis Royal in the western part of the valley, beginning in 1605. From there, the Acadians spread throughout the Valley, in various communities, building dykes to claim the tidal lands along the Annapolis and Cornwallis Rivers. They continued throughout the Annapolis Valley until the British-ordered expulsion of Acadians in 1755 which is memorialized at Grand-Pré in the eastern part of the valley. New England Planters moved in to occupy the abandoned Acadian farming areas and the region also saw subsequent settlement by Loyalist refugees of the American Revolutionary War, as well as foreign Protestants. These were followed by significant numbers of freed Africans in the War of 1812, Irish immigrants in the mid-19th century and Dutch immigrants after World War II. Agriculture in the Annapolis valley boomed in the late 19th century with the arrival of the Windsor and Annapolis Railway, later the Dominion Atlantic Railway, which developed large export markets for Annapolis Valley apples.

The Annapolis Valley Regional Library was established in 1949. It was the first regional library system in Nova Scotia.

== Economy ==
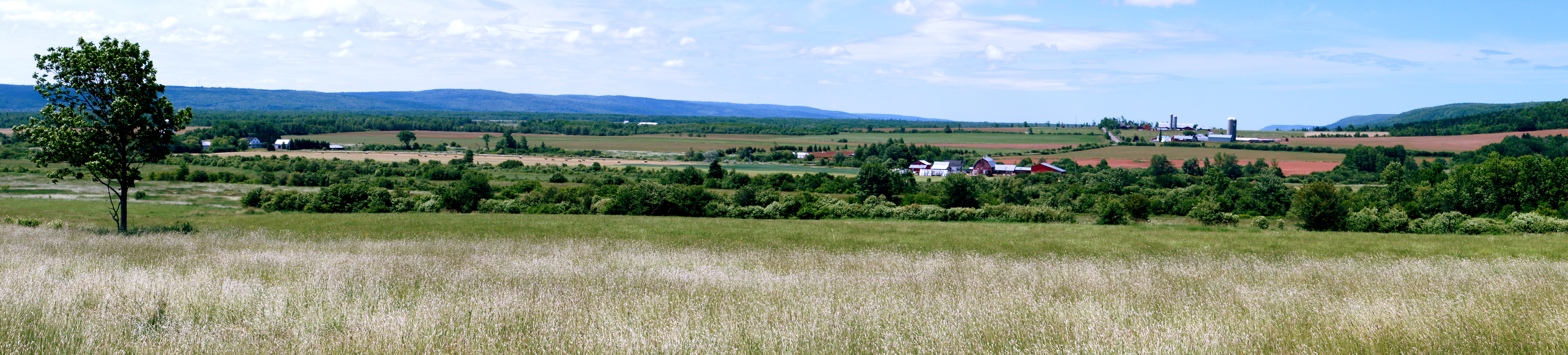
Central Valley, looking west southwest across farms in Clarence

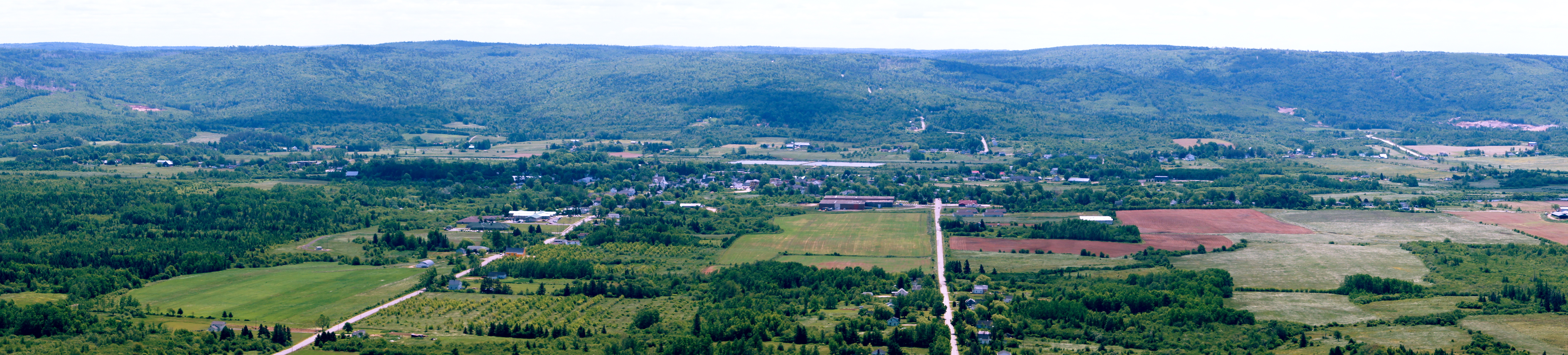
Western Valley, overlooking narrowest part of Annapolis Valley towards Bridgetown

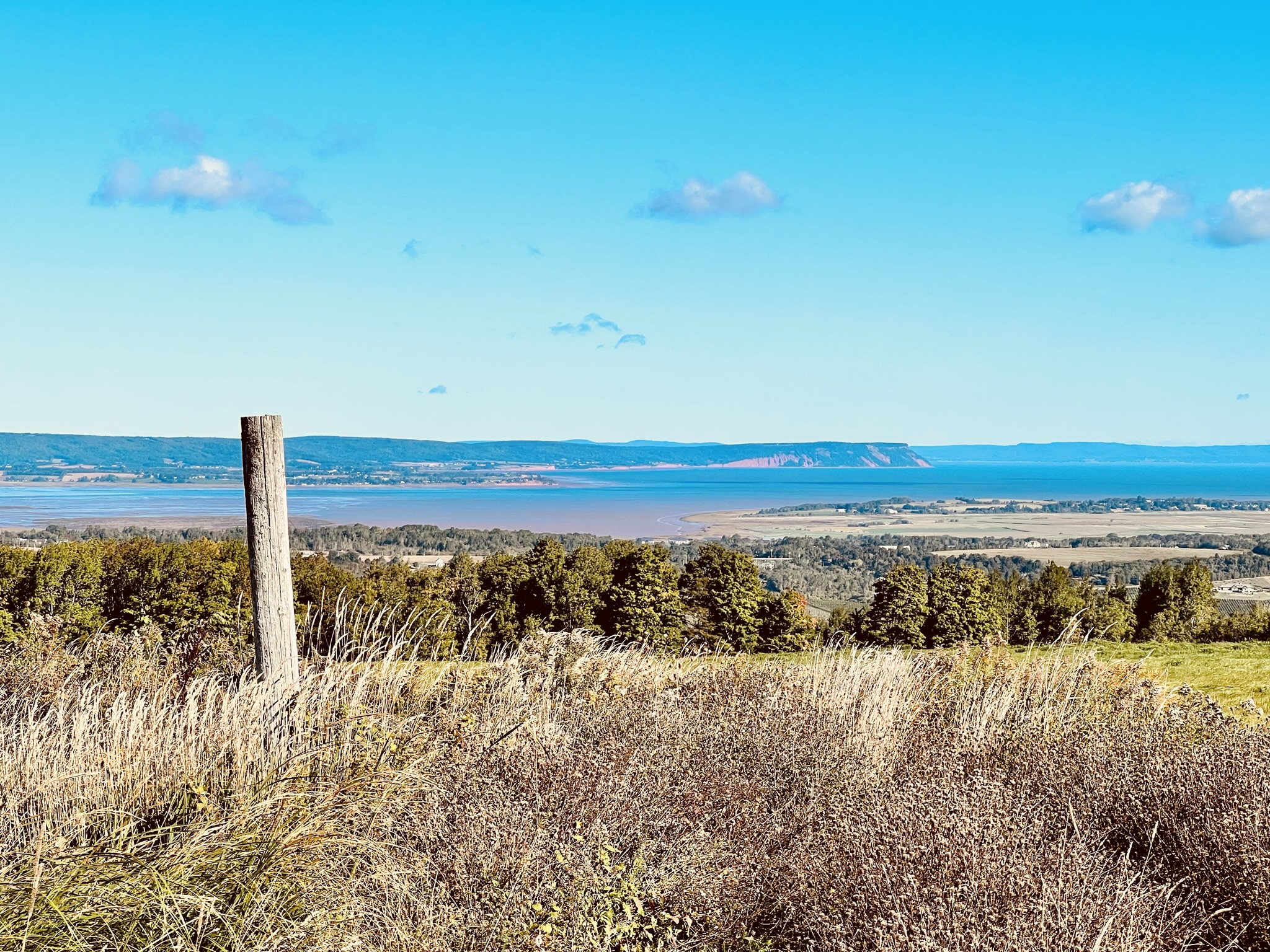
Eastern end, overlooking Wolfville, Nova Scotia

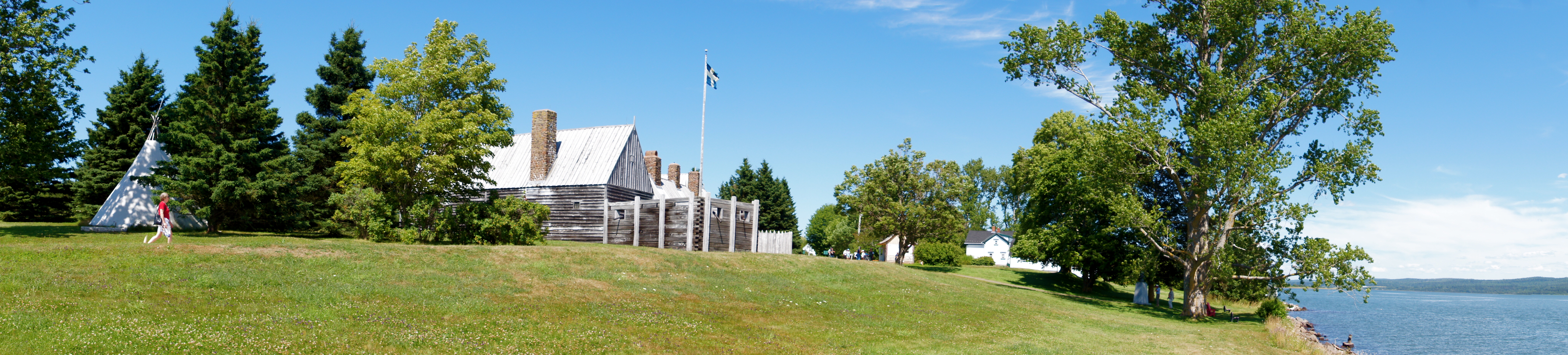
Western end, at Port-Royal habitation, where Annapolis River widens to form the Annapolis Basin

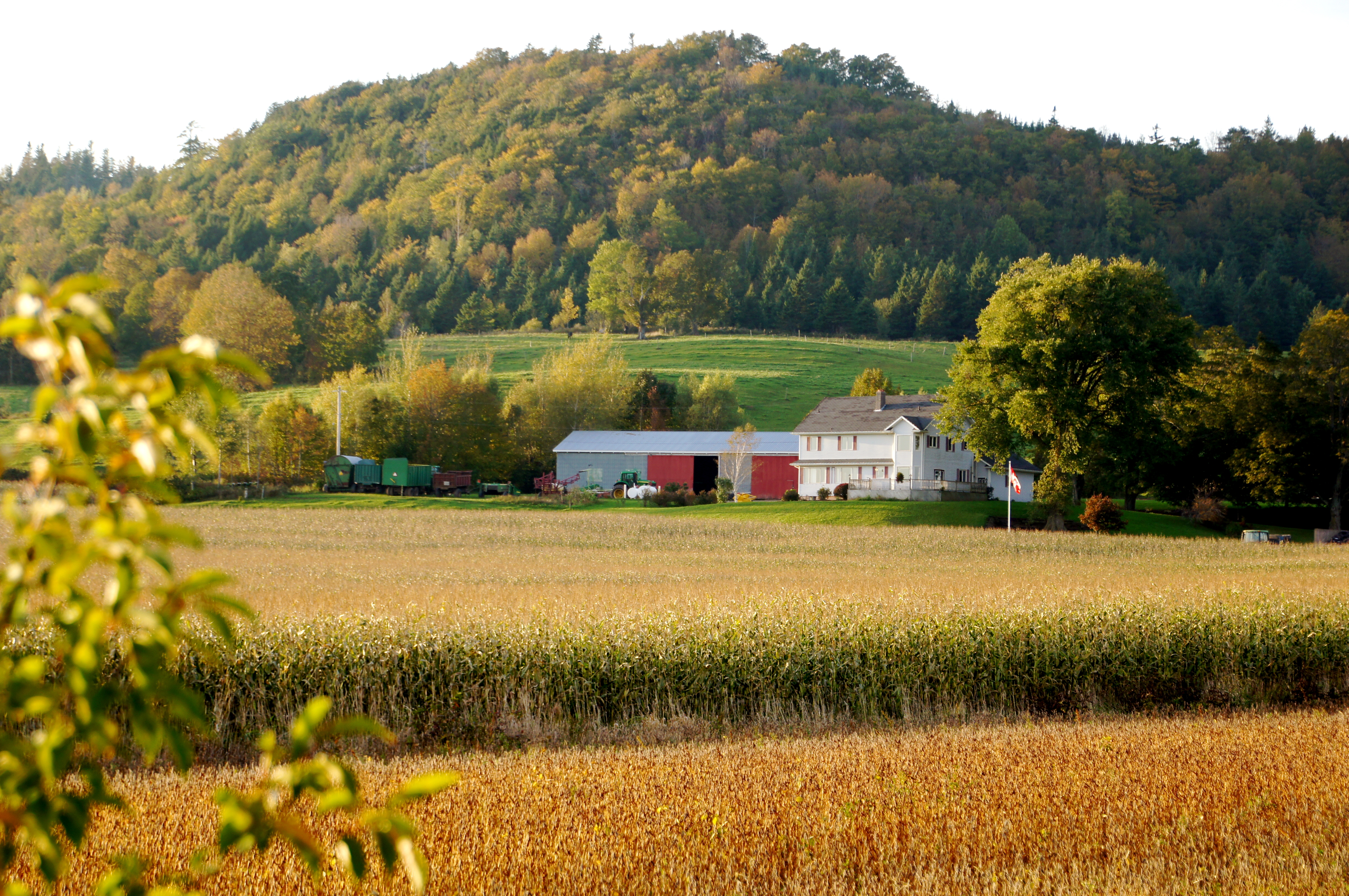
Corn at Grafton

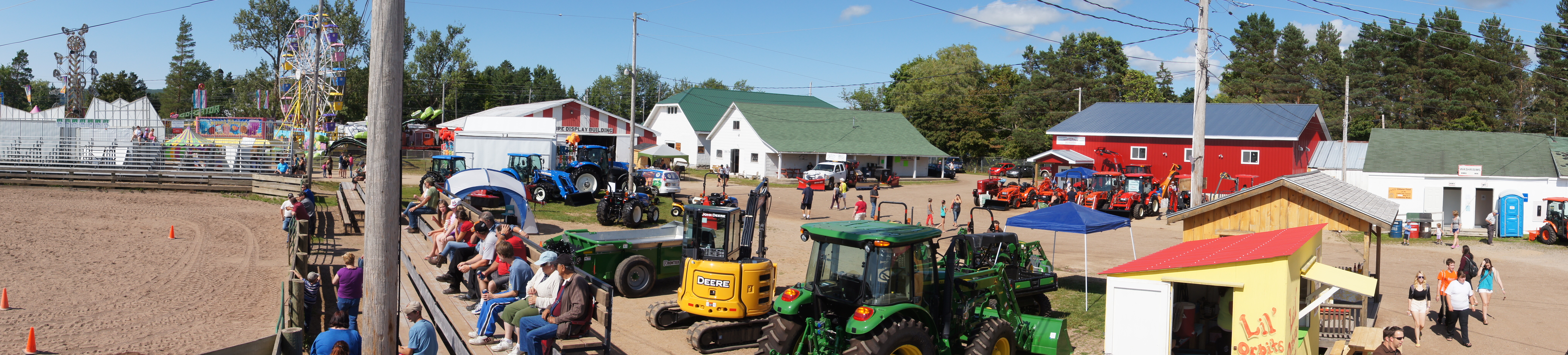
Lawrencetown Exhibition

The Valley has traditionally been built on a diversified agricultural industry, with a wide range of output ranging from livestock to fruit trees and berries. The last quarter-century has also seen the development of a wine industry, with such notable wineries as Gaspereau Vineyards winning national and international awards for their produce.

Today, the Valley is still largely dominated by agriculture but also has a growing diversity in its economies, partly aided by the importance of post-secondary education centres provided by Acadia University in Wolfville, and the Nova Scotia Community College campuses located in Kentville, Middleton, Lawrencetown, and Digby.

Michelin has an important truck tire manufacturing plant in Waterville and the Department of National Defence has its largest air force base in Atlantic Canada located at CFB Greenwood along with an important training facility at Camp Aldershot, near Kentville.

Tourism is also an important industry and the Annapolis Valley is known for its scenic farmland, although today some is threatened with suburban development in the eastern end, and a great deal has been abandoned. The valley also struggles with pollution from farm runoffs and residential sewers in its two major rivers, the Annapolis River and the Cornwallis River. The Annapolis Valley additionally has become home to the majority of Nova Scotia wineries, located in either the Gaspereau Valley or in the Canning, Grand Pré, or Bear River areas.

The Valley is home to the annual Apple Blossom Festival, held in late spring. In July is the annual Steer Bar-B-Que in Kingston, and Heart of the Valley Festival in Middleton. August sees Mud Creek Days in Wolfville and the Annapolis Valley Exhibition in Lawrencetown. Bridgetown's Cider Festival comes in mid-September. The Canadian Deep Roots Music Festival is held each year at the end of September in Wolfville, a community-based festival, supported by both the Town of Wolfville and Acadia University and built by over 100 volunteers, and on in-kind and financial support from virtually all sectors of the Valley community. Late October sees Wolfville and Kings County play host to Devour! The Food Film Fest, an annual international film festival celebrating all things culinary. Farmers markets in Annapolis Royal, Bridgetown, Middleton, Kentville, Kingsport, Berwick and Wolfville bring a produce and other goods to the public every week. In the fall, there is the Pumpkin People in Kentville.

== Communities ==
Communities in the Valley from west to east include:

- Digby
- Cornwallis
- Annapolis Royal
- Bridgetown
- Lawrencetown
- Middleton
- Greenwood
- Kingston
- Auburn
- Aylesford
- Berwick
- Waterville
- Cambridge
- Coldbrook
- Kentville
- New Minas
- Canning
- Wolfville
- Grand-Pré
- Glooscap
- Hantsport
- Mount Denson
- Falmouth
- Windsor
- Mount Uniacke
- Rawdon
- East Hants
- Nine Mile River
- Elmsdale
- Milford

== Notable residents ==
- William Hall (1827–1904), the first Black person, first Nova Scotian, and the third Canadian to receive the Victoria Cross
- Benjamin Jackson (1835–1915), Black Nova Scotian sailor, farmer, and decorated veteran of the American Civil War
