= Victoria Vale =

Coordinates: 44°59′42.34″N 65°4′14.95″W

Victoria Vale in Nova Scotia

Victoria Vale is a community in the Canadian province of Nova Scotia, located in Annapolis County. It is situated in a valley on North Mountain, at an elevation of 100 m. It is on Nova Scotia Route 362. It was named for Queen Victoria following her silver jubilee in 1862.

== See also ==
- Royal eponyms in Canada
