= Danica Roache =

Canadian writer

Danica Roache is a Mi'kmaw writer and a member of the Glooscap First Nation. Her writing is primarily fiction. Roache's writing has won and been nominated for several awards, including being longlisted for the 2012 CBC Poetry Prize and shortlisted for the Malahat Review's 2026 Open Season Award for creative non-fiction. Roache won the 2026 Dartmouth Book Award for Fiction from the Nova Scotia Book Awards for her first novel, Five Seasons of Charlie Francis. Five Seasons of Charlie Francis was also won the 2026 Margaret and John Savage First Book Award and was nominated for the Thomas Raddall Atlantic Fiction Award. Recently, Roache was nominated for the 2026 Indigenous Voices Awards. Roache received a commission in 2023 from the Writers' Federation of Nova Scotia to create work inspired by noted Mi'kmaw poet Rita Joe.

Her mother is Trina Roache, an award-winning journalist.
