= North Kingston, Nova Scotia =

Community in Nova Scotia, Canada

Coordinates: 45°0′53.78″N 64°57′23.38″W

North Kingston in Nova Scotia

North Kingston is a community in the Canadian province of Nova Scotia, located in Kings County, at the foot of the North Mountain. The community is 3 km from the village of Kingston, although that is not its namesake, but rather the original Kingston Village, which is now known as Greenwood.
