= Glooscap 35 =

Coordinates: 45°02′33″N 64°14′17″W

Glooscap 35 in Nova Scotia

Glooscap 35 is a Mi'kmaq reserve located in Kings County, Nova Scotia.

It is administratively part of the Glooscap First Nation.
