= Gilbert Lafayette Foster =

Canadian Surgeon General (1874–1940)

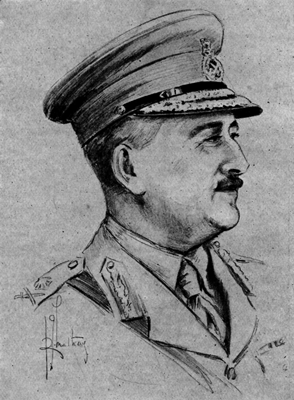
- Born: May 29, 1874; King's County, Wolfville, Nova Scotia
- Died: May 17, 1940 (aged 65)
- Education: New York Medical College
- Scientific career
- Fields: Surgeon-General
- Workplaces: Royal Canadian Army Medical Corps

Major-General G.L. Foster KStJ, CB, MD, LLD, MD (29 May 1874 – 17 May 1940) was the 6th Canadian Surgeon General.

Born in King's County, Wolfville, Nova Scotia, Gilbert Lafayette Foster was educated at New York Medical College, where he graduated with a Medical Degree in 1896.

After graduation, Foster took up general practice in both Canning and Halifax, Nova Scotia. He also joined "the Canadian Militia as Surgeon-Lieutenant of the 68th (King’s County) Regiment." From 1898 to 1900 Foster served in the Yukon Field Force "(during [the] South African Campaign)." He was promoted to Captain in 1901 and Major the following year.

In 1905, Foster "joined the Royal Canadian Army Medical Corps [known as Permanent Active Militia Medical Corps (referred to as PAMC during WWI)]", and was promoted to Lieutenant-Colonel in 1907.

With the outbreak of war, he was sent overseas in 1914 as the Deputy Assistant Director of Medical Services (D.A.D.M.S.) for the first Canadian Contingent. He was soon promoted to Colonel and A.D.M.S. when Col. G.C. Jones was elevated to the overseas position of Director Medical Services Canadians. Foster accompanied the 1st Canadian Division to France in February 1915 and, upon arrival of the 2nd Canadian Division later that summer, was elevated to the new post of Deputy Director Medical Services (Canadian Corps), serving as the senior medical authority for the Canadian Corps in the field. In February 1917 he was promoted to replace Jones as Director Medical Services Canadians and was transferred to Canadian HQ in London.

Remaining overseas until late 1919, Major-General Foster oversaw the repatriation of thousands of Canadian casualties who remained under medical care following the Armistice, the closure of Canadian hospitals in the U.K. and the demobilization of the C.E.F. medical service. Working side-by-side with the D.G.M.S., Maj.-Gen. J.T. Fotheringham, through 1920, he helped plan the re-organization of the post-war Canadian Army Medical Corps, and succeeded to the post of Director General Medical Services upon Fotheringham's retirement in September 1920, before retiring himself in Dec 1920. Upon leaving the military profession, Foster returned to Nova Scotia, living the remainder of his life in the Annapolis Valley.

His son, Major-General Harry Wickwire Foster, had a distinguished career within the army, including "[presiding] over the court martial of Canada’s top prisoner of war, SS General Kurt Meyer."

Foster died on 17 May 1940 at the age of 65.
