= Annapolis Valley First Nation =

First Nation in Nova Scotia, Canada

Annapolis Valley First Nation is composed of two Mi'kmaq First Nation reserves located in southwestern Nova Scotia. As of 2023, the Mi'kmaq population is 121 on-Reserve, and approximately 200 off-Reserve for a total population of 321. The community has a gas bar, tobacco shop, gaming centre, health centre, and a chapel. It is the smallest First Nation community in Nova Scotia in terms of population.

In 1984 Glooscap First Nation separated from Annapolis Valley First Nation and became its own community.

== Composition ==
Annapolis Valley First Nation is composed of two parts as shown:

Community	Area	Location	Population	Date established
Annapolis Valley First Nation	59 hectares (150 acres)	88 km. northwest of Halifax	140	March 3, 1880
St. Croix 34	126.20 hectares (311.8 acres)	46.4 km. northwest of Halifax	0	March 3, 1851

== See also ==
- List of Indian Reserves in Nova Scotia
- List of Indian Reserves in Canada
