= Debert Palaeo-Indian Site =

Archaeological site in Nova Scotia, Canada

- Location within Nova Scotia
- 45.419°N 63.416°W
- Type: Settlement
- Cultures: Paleo-Indian
- Location: near Debert, Colchester County, Nova Scotia, Canada

Site notes
- Area: 22 acres (8.9 ha)
- Excavation dates: 1962–64
- Archaeologists: D. S. Byers
- Discovered: 29 August 1948

The Debert Palaeo-Indian Site is located nearly three miles southeast of Debert, Colchester County, Nova Scotia, Canada. The Nova Scotia Museum has listed the site as a Special Place under the Special Places Protection Act. It is the only Palaeo-Indian site in Nova Scotia and the oldest archaeological site in the province. The Debert site is significant to North American archaeology because it is the most northeasterly Palaeo-Indian site discovered to date. It also provides evidence for the earliest human settlements in eastern North America, which have been dated to 10,500–11,000 years ago. Additionally, this archaeological site remains one of the few Palaeo-Indian settlements to be identified within the region of North America that was once glaciated.

There is an interpretive trail at the site, and the construction of a Miꞌkmaw cultural centre has been in planning since the 2000s.

== History ==
During the Second World War, a major air base and staging area for men and convoy material being shipped from Halifax to Britain was established in the Debert area. In 1943, construction began to expand parking facilities for military divisions stationed at the site. The parking lot expansion and mortar range activity near the end of the war subsequently decapitated the deposit and left only a small portion of the ancient site to be investigated. Excavations at the site covered approximately seven acres, however further test excavations would reveal that the original occupation covered at least twenty acres.

The site was first discovered on August 29, 1948, by E.S. Eaton and his wife who noticed an abundance of blueberries growing in the area. Wind erosion had exposed a small number of artifacts on the bulldozed surface of the parking lot. Eaton, who worked at the Truro Agricultural College and also incorporated archaeology into his agricultural investigations, collected artifacts from the site for several years after he and his wife first discovered the site. In 1955, Eaton contacted R.S. MacNeish to inform him about the site in Debert. MacNeish, who then served as the chief archaeologist at the National Museum of Canada, recorded the location of the site for further investigation after examining some of the specimens.

E.S. Eaton would later sell his collection of specimens from multiple sites in eastern Canada to a collector from Kentville, Nova Scotia named W.A. Dennis. The collection was later stored at Mt. St.Vincent University following the death of Dennis, who left the collection to the university in his will. After reading Dennis’s note in the American Antiquity, Nova Scotia provincial archaeologist J.S. Erksine visited the site with E.S. Eaton to obtain additional material. The collection was later allocated to the Nova Scotia Museum of Science in Halifax Nova Scotia.

In September 1962, D.S. Byers, the director of the R.S. Peabody Foundation for archaeology in Andover, Massachusetts, conducted a thorough test excavation that revealed undisturbed areas of the deposit. Following the thorough archaeological testing, Byers developed plans for a full scale excavation project in the summer of 1963 and again in the summer of 1964 with a larger group of excavators. These full scale excavations were directed by George Macdonald from the National Museum of Man. The Debert Paleo-Indian site eventually became listed as a National Historic Site of Canada in 1972.

In late autumn of 1989, employees at the Department of Lands and Forests Tree Breeding Center in Debert noticed that their stumping operations could have been disturbing archaeological remains. Archaeologists from the Nova Scotia Museum and Saint Mary’s University checked the area following the concerns expressed about possible disturbance. During this check they discovered two new Paleo-Indian sites, which are now named Belmont I and Belmont II. Further excavations directed by Dr. Stephen Davis of Saint Mary’s University were performed at the new Belmont sites in 1990, where an undisturbed living floor was uncovered along with over 700 artifacts. These testings recovered the first fluted points within a buried context in Nova Scotia since 1964. The majority of artifacts discovered at the Belmont sites were virtually identical to those found at the Debert site, which suggests that the sites had possibly been occupied during the same time period.

== Evidence of Palaeo-Indian Settlement ==
Evidence of First Peoples settlement at the Debert Palaeo Indian site has been found through examination of stone tools that are distinctive to Palaeo-Indian tool kits. Radiocarbon dating has determined that these distinctive stone tools existed approximately 10,600 years ago. Excavations recovered 4500 artifacts over 22 acres of land and found channel flutes that were consistent with the characteristics of hafted tools present on many Paleo-Indian sites. Channel fluting was a tool constructing method used by the Palaeo-Indians, which involved thinning the base of a tool by removing channel flakes so that stone tools like spear points could be attached to wood or bone shafts. Large stone knives that were possibly used to butcher caribou were also documented as strong evidence for Palaeo-Indian occupation at the Debert site, along with the small pointed or spurred end scrapers unique to the Palaeo-Indians. These end scrapers were likely used to cleanse animal hides. Further archaeological evidence suggests that the site served as a small seasonal hunting camp, possibly re-occupied over several generations. Due to the decomposition of organic materials, stone artifacts that have survived over many decades are recognized as the most frequently documented forms of evidence at the Debert site. Evidence of organic material has also been recovered from blood residue on hunting tools that archaeologists have identified as caribou.

== Palaeo-Indian Migration Path and Life at the Site ==
The First Peoples are thought to have migrated into the Debert area just prior to the Younger Dryas stadial. The Palaeo-Indians possibly crossed the Bering Strait during and following the Wisconsinian Glacial Stage, where they then migrated to the southern regions of North America. Next, the Palaeo-Indians are thought to have gradually migrated east and north into what is now the Canadian Maritimes. Archaeologists have hypothesized that these early settlers were nomadic big game hunters who relied on migrating herds of caribou for survival. Small game such as fish and fowl would have also been an important food resource for the Palaeo-Indians. To survive the freezing cold climatic conditions, the early settlers likely wore tailored clothing and constructed skin covered tents with wooden frames for shelter.
