= Kingston, Nova Scotia =

Kingston
- Village
- Seal

- Location within Nova Scotia
- Coordinates: 44°59′41″N 64°56′47″W
- Country: Canada
- Province: Nova Scotia
- County: Kings
- Incorporated: 1957
- Electoral Districts: List: Federal: West Nova; Provincial: Kings West

Government
  - Village Chair: John Pierce (2019)
  - Village Committee: Village of Kingston Commission
- Elevation: 28 m (92 ft)

Population (2021)
  - Total: 3,466
- Time zone: UTC-4 (AST)
- Postal code: B0P 1R0
- Area code: 902
- Telephone Exchange: 242, 760, 765, 804, 996
- NTS Map: 021A15
- GNBC Code: CATAQ
- Website: kingston novascotia.ca

Kingston is a Canadian village in Kings County on the north bank of the Annapolis River in the Annapolis Valley of Nova Scotia, Canada. As of 2021, the population was 3,466.

This village is home to Clairmont Provincial Park. It is a small picnic park approximately 12 km from the Fundy Shore. This park's picnic area is situated under a stand of red pine, providing a cool oasis away from the valley heat.

== History ==
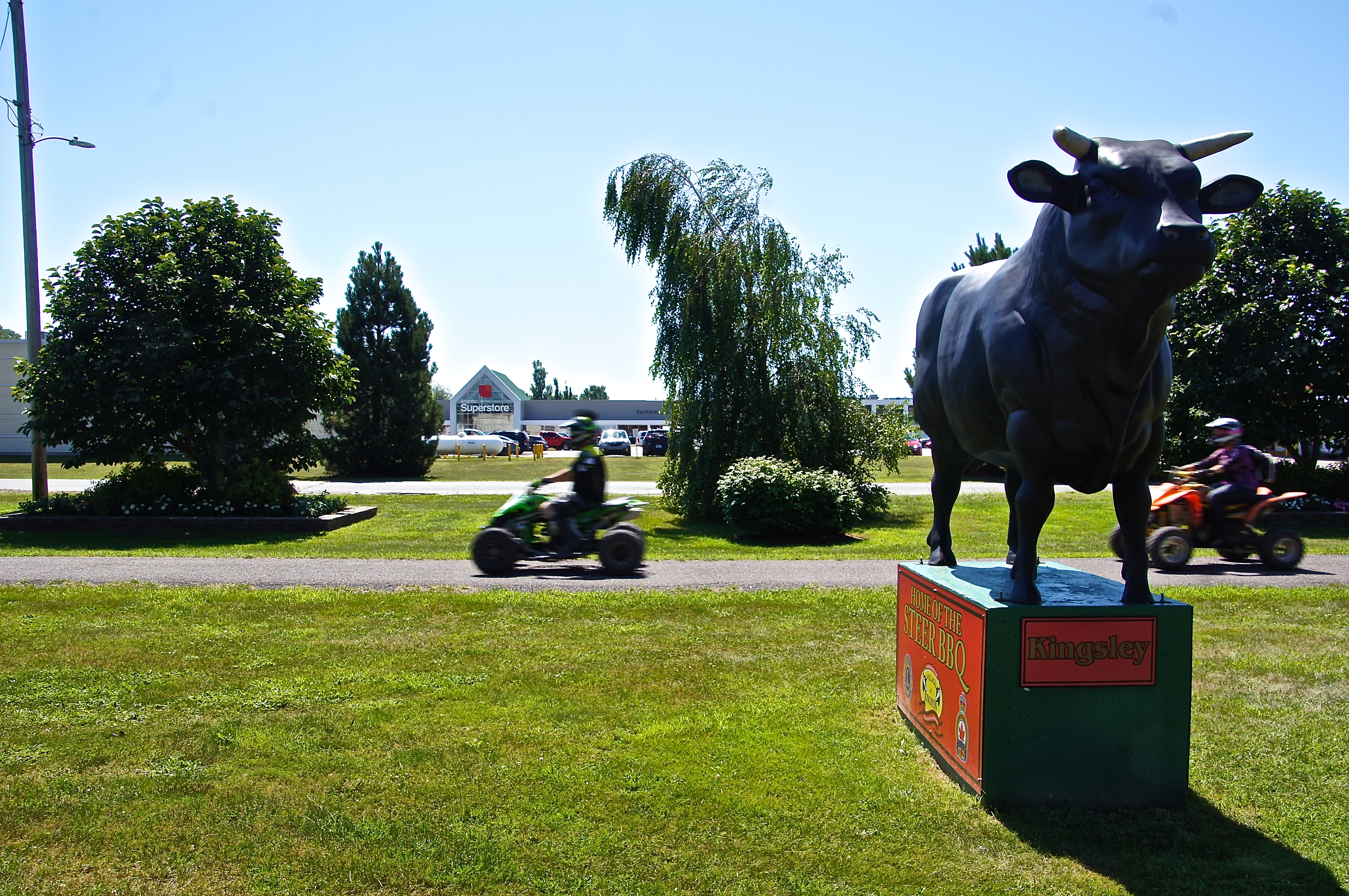
A statue of a steer stands facing Main Street, representing the steer barbecue event held annually in the town square.

Kingston remains as a major service centre for the apple growing industry in the area of western Kings County and has a growing retail district, owing to its access to Highway 101. The land which Kingston sits on today was originally owned by Bishop Inglis, the first Anglican Bishop of Nova Scotia, granted to him in 1790. By the early 1800s he had sold off most of the land along the Annapolis River, converted into farm lots. The small community centered on these farms was at first called "Bloomfield", but the name "Kingston Station" was given to it in 1868 when the Halifax-Yarmouth main line of the Dominion Atlantic Railway was built and passed through the community, with its station being meant to serve the neighboring communities of Kingston Village (now known as Greenwood) and North Kingston. After the arrival of the railway, Kingston Station developed into a local service and light manufacturing centre.

In the 1940s, the adjacent village of Greenwood was selected to be the site of a Royal Air Force and later Royal Canadian Air Force station, under the British Commonwealth Air Training Plan. Today, CFB Greenwood is the largest airbase in Atlantic Canada, and is the largest employer in the area.

Kingston was incorporated as a village on June 1, 1957, in order to facilitate the construction of a sewer, a much needed utility that solved the problem of flooding caused by the area's sandy terrain.

== Present day ==
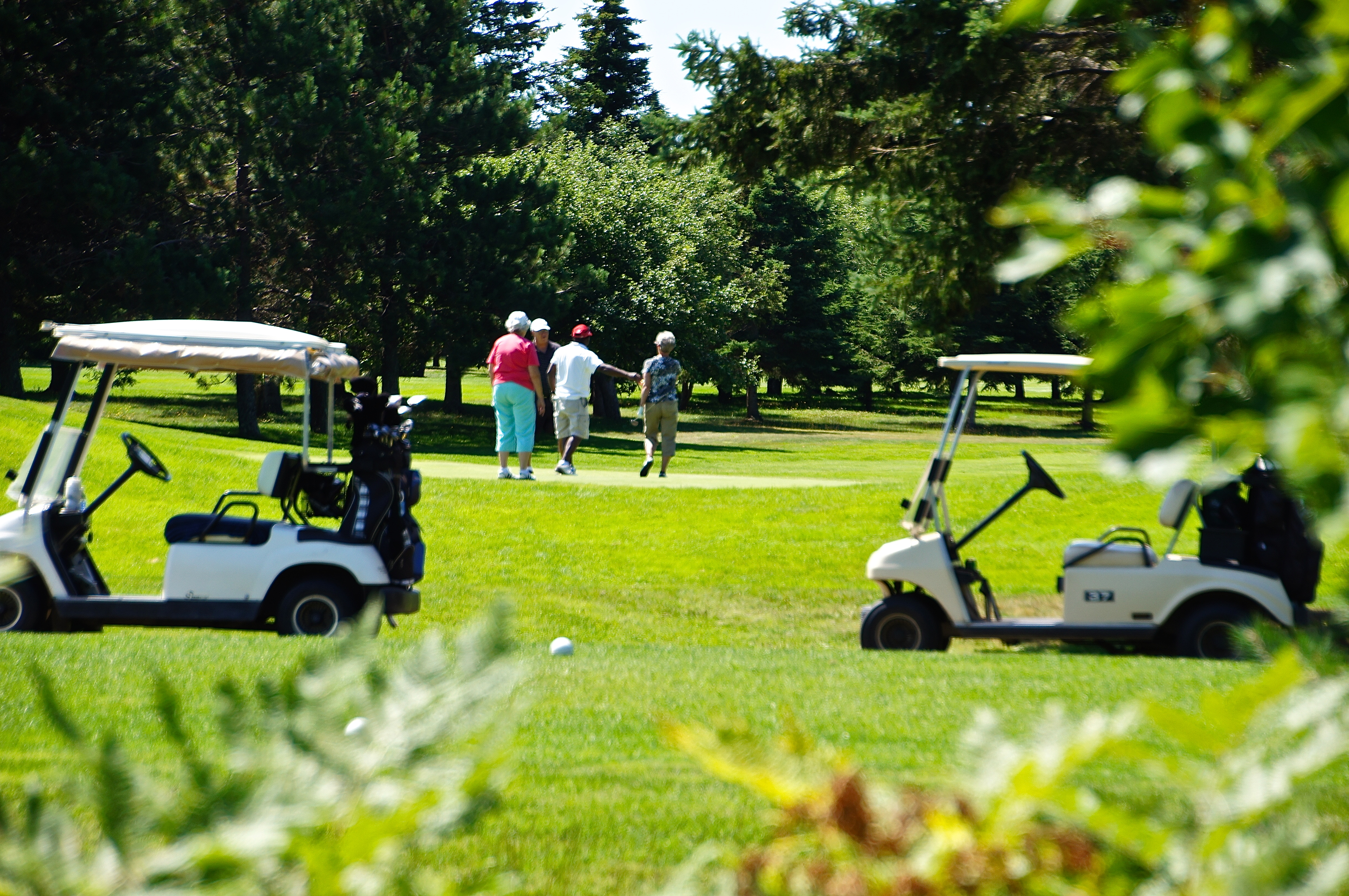
Paragon Golf and Country Club is a semiprivate golf course consisting of 18 golfholes in the Annapolis Valley, at Kingston, Nova Scotia.

The villages of Kingston and Greenwood are sometimes called Kingston-Greenwood, as they share the same highway exit and local telephone exchange.

Every year, on the second Saturday in July, the village hosts its annual Steer BBQ, involving a parade and a small fair, where an entire steer is roasted. This has been a tradition in the community for over 50 years.

The village has a local elementary and middle school which is the Kingston and District Elementary School and Pine Ridge Middle School respectively.

== See also ==
- Royal eponyms in Canada
