= Silas Tertius Rand =

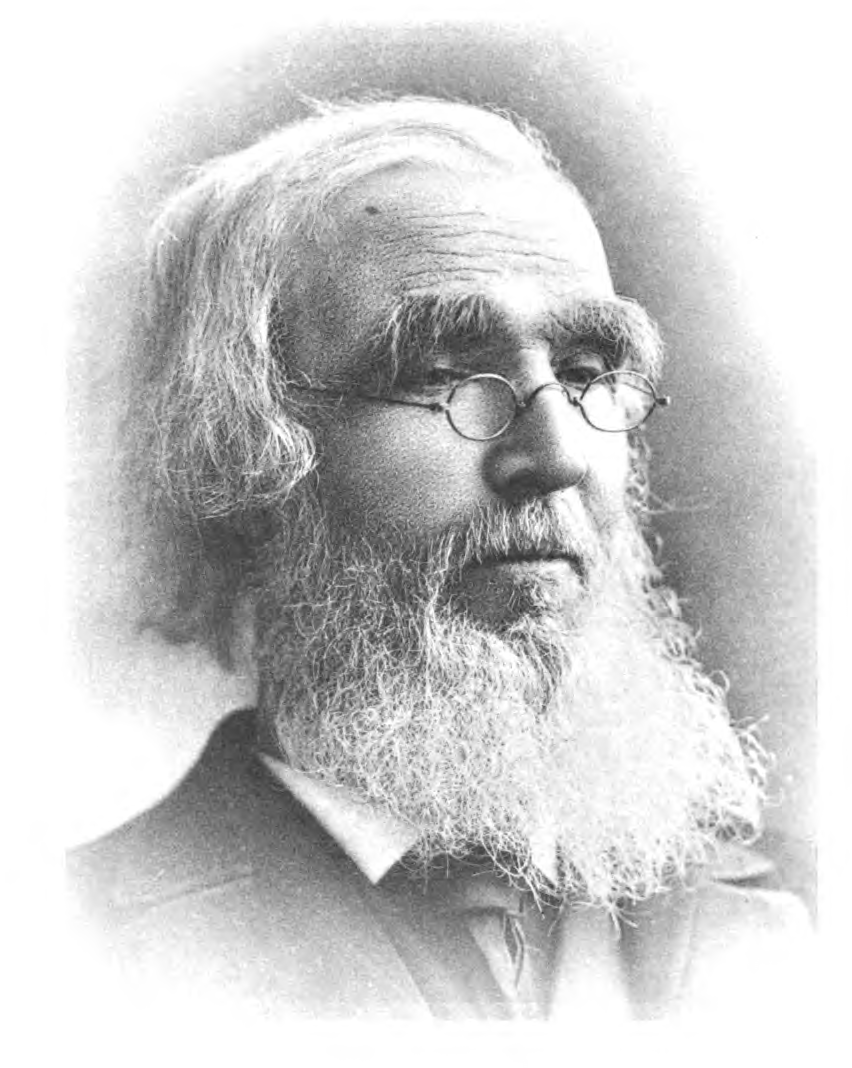
- Born: May 18, 1810; Cornwallis, Nova Scotia
- Died: October 4, 1889 (aged 79); Hantsport, Nova Scotia
- Occupations: Baptist clergyman, missionary, ethnologist, linguist and translator

Silas Tertius Rand (May 18, 1810 – October 4, 1889) was a Canadian Baptist clergyman, missionary, ethnologist, linguist and translator. His work centred on the Mi'kmaq people of Maritime Canada and he was the first to record the legend of Glooscap.

== Life ==
Silas Rand was born in the community of Brooklyn Street about six miles west of Kentville, Nova Scotia in the Township of Cornwallis. He was a son of bricklayer Silas Rand and his wife Deborah Tupper. Though largely uneducated, his father taught the younger Rand to read and later sent him to school, which he attended until the age of 11. He then took up bricklaying with his father. At age nineteen, Rand was introduced to English grammar and he began the study of languages. By age 21, he began teaching grammar. At 23, he entered Horton Academy (part of Acadia University) to study Latin but he left the school a month later, learning Latin grammar at home while he worked as a bricklayer.

In 1833 he underwent a religious conversion. He was baptized and decided to devote his life to God. In 1834 he was ordained a Baptist minister. He took a position in Liverpool, Nova Scotia where he met Jane Elizabeth McNutt, whom he married in 1838. The couple had twelve children. Rand was later a pastor in Windsor, Nova Scotia and Charlottetown, Prince Edward Island.

In 1846 he was offered an opportunity to travel to Burma as a missionary, but he elected instead to work among the Mi'kmaq. He obtained the support of the Protestant evangelicals of Halifax and in 1849 helped found the Micmac Missionary Society, a full-time Mi'kmaq mission. Basing his work in Hantsport, Nova Scotia, where he lived from 1853 until his death, he travelled widely among Mi'kmaq communities, spreading the faith, learning the language, and recording examples of the Mi'kmaq oral tradition. He was poorly funded in his work, and had to resort to colportage, or begging to sustain his mission. By 1864 he decided to rely on unsolicited donations, trusting in faith to provide, and was thus expelled from the Society, which was dissolved, in 1870.

After a long period of disagreement with the Baptist church, he eventually returned to the church in 1885. He died at Hantsport in 1889. After his death, land he had purchased just outside Hantsport was used to create Horton Indian Reserve, later becoming Glooscap First Nation.

== Linguist ==
Rand mastered many languages including Mi'kmaq, Maliseet, Mohawk, French, Italian, German, Spanish, Latin and modern Greek. In Maliseet he published some Bible Selections in 1863 and the Gospel of John in 1870. In Mi'kmaq he produced the whole New Testament and the Old Testament books of Genesis, Exodus and Psalms. He compiled a Mi'kmaq dictionary and collected numerous legends, and through his published work, was the first to introduce the stories of Glooscap to the wider world. He also kept a diary. The diary was written primarily in Latin; it has not yet been translated or studied.

== Honours ==
Late in his life, Rand's work with the Mi'kmaq was recognized with honorary degrees from Queen's University (L.L.D., 1886); Acadia College (D.D, 1886); and King's College (D.C.L.).

== Publications include ==
- The jubilee historical sketch of the Nova Scotia Baptist Association (Charlottetown, 1849)
- A short statement of facts relating to the history, manners, customs, language, and literature of the Micmac tribe of Indians, in Nova-Scotia and P.E. Island (Halifax, 1850)
- (Attributed) Ae Buk ov Samz in Mikmak (tr. The Book of Psalms) Published by the Phonetic Institute (Bath, 1854) Link large file
- A short account of the Lord’s work among the Micmac Indians . . . with some reasons for . . . seceding from the Baptist denomination (Halifax, 1873)
- A brief statement respecting the Micmac mission (1880)
- The dying Indian’s dream, a poem (Windsor, N.S., 1881)
- The Micmac mission (1882)
- Dictionary of the language of the Micmac Indians (Halifax, 1888). Online version.
- Hymni recentes latini: translationes et originales per Silam Tertium Randium (Halifa, 1888)
- Legends of the Micmacs edited and with a foreword by Helen L. Webster, (New York and London, 1893). Online version with preface by publisher Jacob Rabinowitz: Volume 1 Volume 2.
