= East Margaretsville =

Community in Nova Scotia, Canada

Coordinates: 45°3′11.34″N 65°1′10.18″W

East Margaretsville in Nova Scotia

East Margaretsville is a community in the Canadian province of Nova Scotia, located in Annapolis County. It is situated on the side of North Mountain, overlooking the Bay of Fundy.
