= Cape Split =

Headland in Nova Scotia, Canada

Coordinates: 45°20′05″N 64°29′27″W

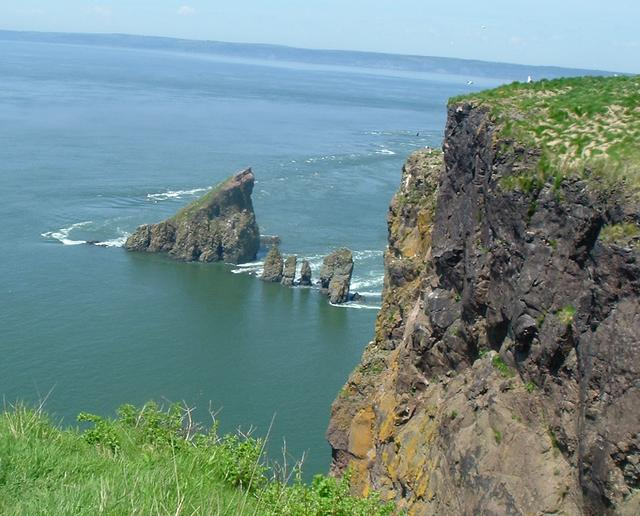
Cape Split cliffs and tidal current

Cape Split is a headland located on the Bay of Fundy coast of the Canadian province of Nova Scotia. The Battle off Cape Split happened during the American Revolution.

Cape Split is located in Kings County and is a continuation of the North Mountain range, which is made of tholeiitic basalt. The cape separates the main part of the Bay of Fundy from the Minas Basin, a sub-basin to the east.

The cape itself is 7 km (4 mi) long and ranges between several kilometres to several dozen metres in width. Both sides of the headland end in high cliffs overlooking treacherous tidal currents in the Minas Channel.

Privately owned until recently, the property has now been sold to the Government of Nova Scotia and is being transformed into a provincial park. Its current status is that of a Reserve Park of 427 hectares. A popular hiking trail has existed for decades on Cape Split, taking approximately 2 to 2.5 hours each way to the tip of the headland. Most of the Cape is heavily forested, but the tip of the peninsula is a meadow, providing excellent long-distance views in good weather.

The cliffs at Cape Split are actively eroding and potentially dangerous. The height of the cliffs is over 60 m (200 ft) and a fall could be fatal. There are several features that appear to be trails, but are actually lines of erosion that lead to steep edges with loose soil and rocks underfoot. Rescue services have been called several times in the past years and are highlighting the need for additional warning signs.

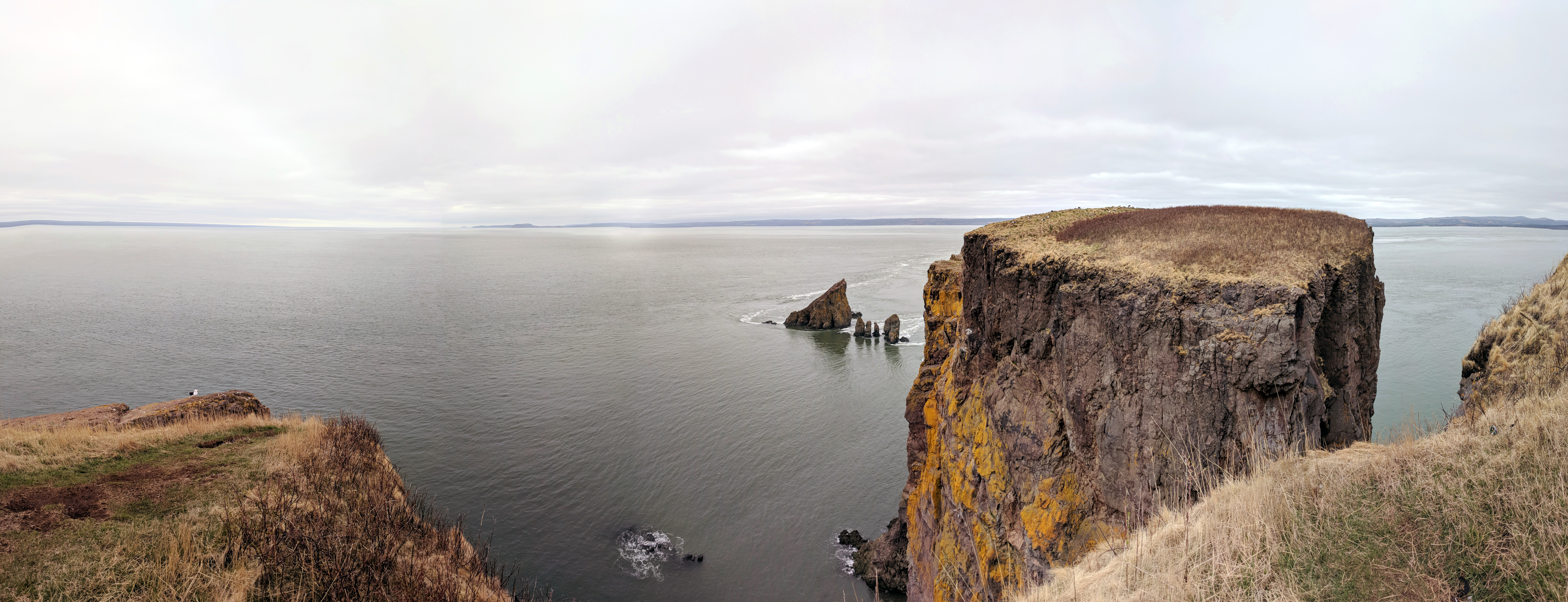
Furthest point on Cape Split hiking trail, overlooking Minas Basin.

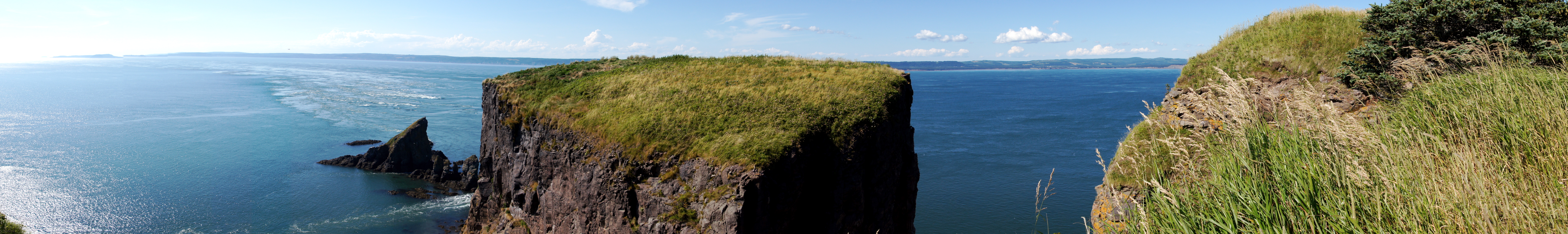
Looking across the Minas Channel, Nova Scotia, Canada into Greville Bay and Cumberland County from the further possible point on Cape Split that a hiker can reach.

== See also ==
- Volcanism of Canada
- Volcanism of Eastern Canada
