= Annapolis Valley Apple Blossom Festival =

Coordinates: 45.082481°N 64.434642°W

Apple Blossom Festival
- Begins: May 24th, 2023 (89th Festival)
- Ends: May 29st, 2023
- Frequency: Yearly
- Location: Annapolis Valley
- Years active: 87
- Inaugurated: 1933
- Website: https://www.appleblossom.com

The Annapolis Valley Apple Blossom Festival is an annual agricultural and heritage celebration held in Nova Scotia's Annapolis Valley usually during the last weekend of May. The festival draws tourists to the area to take in a number of festival events, local culture, the valley and its orchards in full bloom. As of 2017/2018, the festival was celebrating its 85th year - "Rooted in Tradition".

== History ==
Established in 1933 to promote the traditions and agricultural heritage of Annapolis Valley, communities from Windsor to Digby come together to celebrate this event each year. The very first apple blossom parade was hosted in the town of Kentville in 1933.

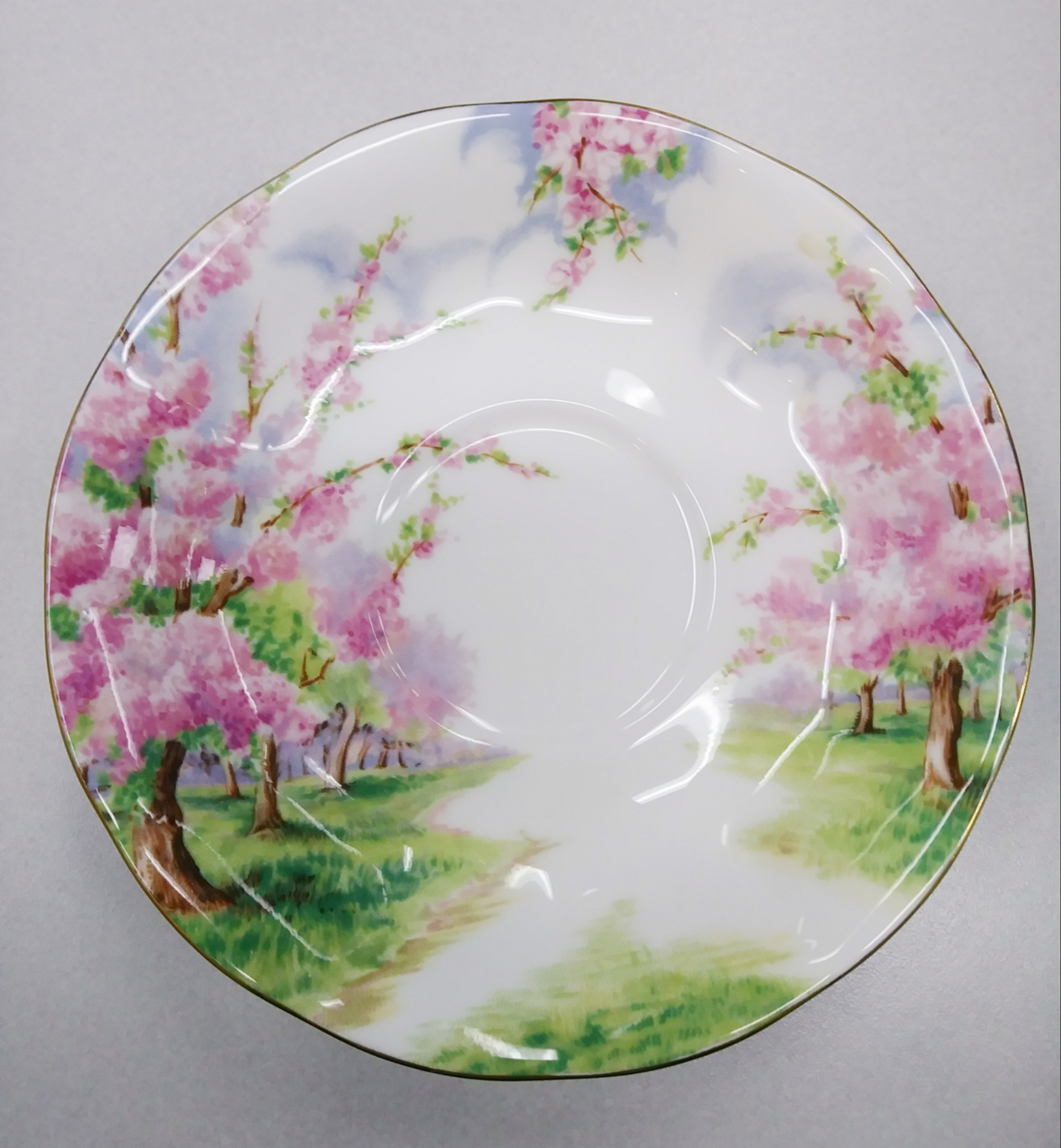
"Blossom Time" saucer by Royal Albert - Designed by G. R. Palmeter

Early promoters of the festival intended for the event to recognize the natural environment of the Valley and the historic background of the apple growing industry, as well as to provide an opportunity to foster and develop local cultural talent. As a result of change and diversification of the region's growing economy, the festival now showcases a variety of local businesses, while continuing to promote local cultural talent and highlight the area's natural environment.

Preparation involves 300 volunteers who plan and participate over a time frame of several months.

== Events ==
Popular events include the Grand Street Parade, Children's Parade, and the Apple Blossom Concert. The festival also showcases social events, such as dances, barbecues, and old-style home-cooked dinners at church and community halls.

The Apple Blossom Grand Street Parade is one of the largest parades in Canada, drawing close to 100,000 people along the route, which runs from New Minas to Kentville and includes marching bands and various floats sponsored by community groups, local businesses and organizations. There are also floats for candidates in the annual Leadership Competition. The Festival includes a large Children's Parade, taking place on Saturday morning before the Grand Street Parade.

In the early 1990s, at Michelin's request, the Thursday night fireworks show, which had always began the weekend-long Apple Blossom Festival, was moved to Saturday night. Since then it has alternated between Friday and Saturday night. In recent years, the fireworks have been held exclusively on Friday night, immediately following the anniversary celebrations of a local radio station.
