= Spa Springs =

Community in Nova Scotia, Canada

Coordinates: 44°57′40.59″N 65°4′11.24″W

Spa Springs in Nova Scotia

Spa Springs is a community in the Canadian province of Nova Scotia, located in Annapolis County. The community was settled by Loyalist Timothy Ruggles.

The curative waters of the local mineral spring was first noticed in the late 1700s, and in 1829 the first visitors arrived from out of province, with local farmhouses providing accommodations to summer visitors. The Spa Springs Hotel opened in 1831 and in August that year a vessel brought visitors from Maine. At around the same time a bath house was in use. The hotel was expanded and modernized in the 1880s, but destroyed by fire in 1889. This prompted the owner to build a bottling plant to manufacture ginger ale and other aerated drinks. In 1890 the Wilmot Spa Springs Company took over the enterprise. (Note: Spa Springs was in the township of Wilmot) Another hotel opened in 1892, but not on the grand scale of the earlier one. Its last visitors were in 1901. The hotel register, now in the care of the Nova Scotia Archives, lists many notable guests including Samuel Cunard, Robert Borden, Joseph Howe and Prince George of Wales.

The bottling plant was destroyed by fire in 1908, and little happened until 1984 when the Mineral Water Company of Canada purchased the site and built a $5.8 million bottling plant, but it struggled financially and closed in 1992. The plant was purchased and renovated in 2009 and now operates as Spa Springs Mineral Water Company.
