= Glooscap First Nation =

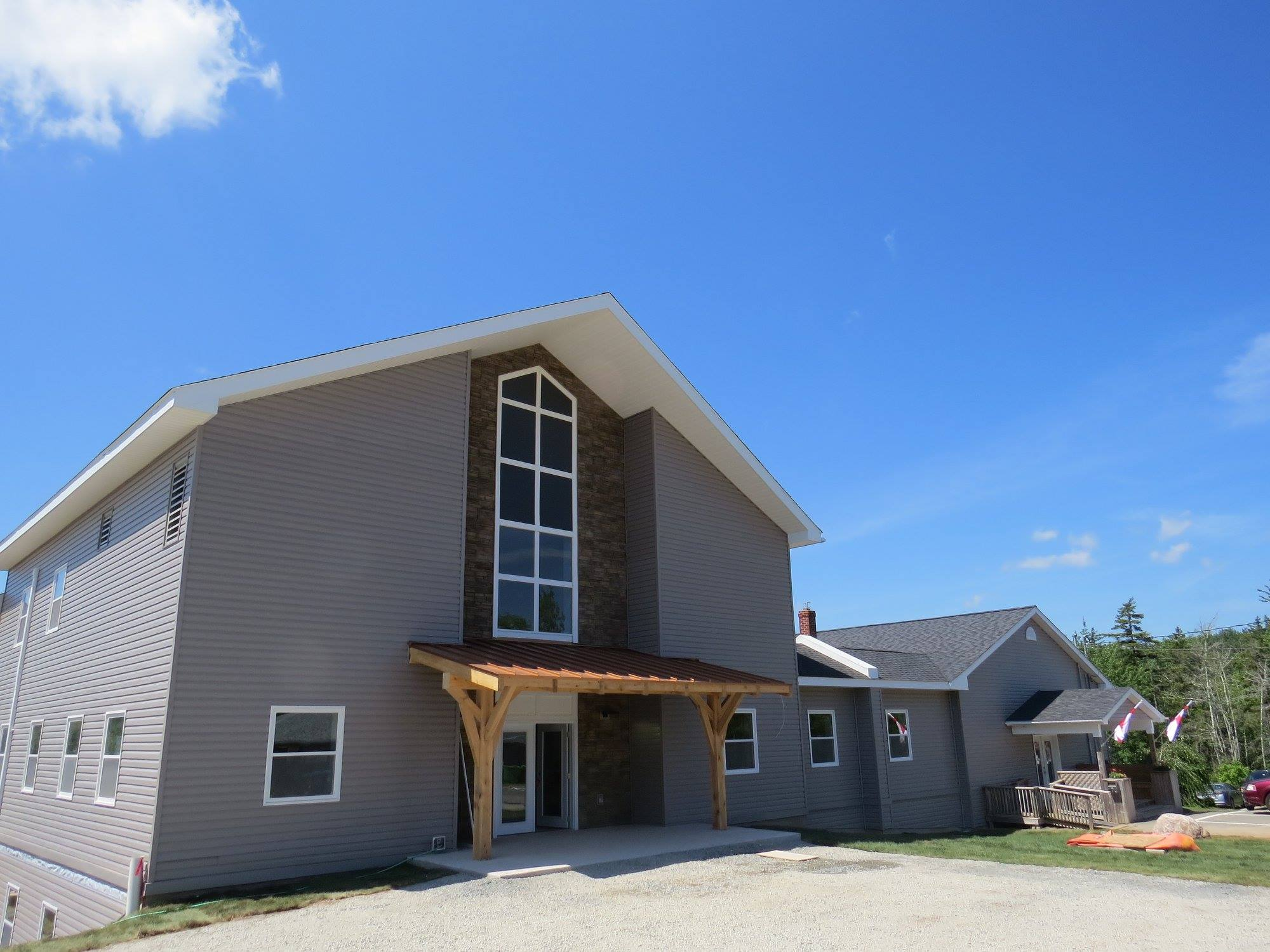
- Motto(s): A community that is spirited and full of life
- Location of Glooscap First Nation in Nova Scotia
- Coordinates: 45°02′25″N 64°13′45″W
- Country: Canada
- Province: Nova Scotia
- County: Kings County
- Established: 1907

Government
  - Chief: Sidney Peters
  - Council: Amanda Francis; Gail Tupper; Charlotte Warrington
  - Member of Parliament: Kody Blois (L)
  - Member of the Legislative Assembly: Julie Vanexan (PC)

Area
  - Land: 2.01 km^{2} (0.78 sq mi)
- Highest elevation: 100 m (330 ft)
- Lowest elevation: 40 m (130 ft)

Population (2025)
  - Total: 458
  - Change 2013-23: ▲41.3%
- Time zone: UTC-4 (Atlantic (AST))
  - Summer (DST): UTC-3 (ADT)
- NTS Map: 021H01
- Website: http://www.glooscapfirstnation.com/

Glooscap First Nation is a Mi'kmaq First Nation community located in Kings County and Hants County, Canada. Also known as Kluskap, the reserve was created in 1907 as Horton Indian Reserve No. 35 and is situated approximately 6.4 kilometres (4.0 mi) from the town of Hantsport. The reserve encompasses 202 hectares (500 acres) of primarily forested land.

The community became an independent First Nation in 1984 and adopted the name Glooscap First Nation in 2005 in honour of Glooscap, a central figure in Mi'kmaq oral tradition. Since the 2010s, Glooscap First Nation has been noted for its economic development initiatives through its corporate arm, Glooscap Ventures, including commercial, renewable energy, gaming, and seafood enterprises.

As of 2025, the registered population was 450 people, with approximately 115 residents living on reserve. Glooscap First Nation is a member of the tribal council, the Confederacy of Mainland Mi'kmaq.

Reserves

- Glooscap 35
- Glooscap Landing

== History ==
The origins of the community date to 1856, when the Micmac Missionary Society, founded by missionary Silas Tertius Rand, purchased land in Bishopville, a small settlement near Hantsport, Nova Scotia. The Society intended to establish what it described as a model Mi'kmaq Baptist community.

In 1907, the surviving trustees of the Micmac Missionary Society transferred approximately 423 acres of land to the federal Department of Indian Affairs. This transfer led to the formal creation of Horton Indian Reserve No. 35, which was administered by Annapolis Valley First Nation, located about 30 kilometres away in Cambridge, Nova Scotia.

By the early 1980s, Horton was experiencing limited access to local services from Annapolis Valley. Advocacy led by Annapolis Valley First Nation Chief Rita Smith resulted in federal approval for Horton to separate and become an independent community. In 1984, Horton formally became its own First Nation, with Rita Smith serving as its first Chief. The community was co-founded by five families: Smith, Peters, Francis, Labrador, and Pictou.

In 2005, Horton officially changed its name to Glooscap First Nation, in honour of Glooscap (Kluskap), a central cultural figure in Mi'kmaq oral tradition. Silas Rand also was the first to record the legends of Glooscap near Glooscap First Nation. According to Mi'kmaq legend, Glooscap's home was located in the region near present-day Blomidon Provincial Park, Nova Scotia.

== Governance ==
Glooscap First Nation is governed by an elected Chief and a three-member council. Day-to-day administrative operations are overseen by a Chief Administrative Officer The community operates under a custom election code that provides for five-year terms for elected leadership.

A list of Chiefs of Glooscap First Nation:

Chief	Period	Terms
Rita Smith	1984-1989	2
Joseph Peters	1989–1995	3
Shirley Clarke	1995–2012	4
Sidney Peters	2012–present	3

In the 2012 election, Sidney Peters was elected Chief with reported turnout approaching 80 percent of eligible voters. Subsequent elections in 2017 and 2022 returned Peters to office.

During the 2010s, the council introduced governance and administrative reforms and established an independent economic development corporation to oversee commercial activities and improve financial transparency.

== Economic Development ==
In 2014, Glooscap First Nation established an independently operated economic development corporation to oversee commercial activities and promote long-term financial sustainability. The corporation was created to pursue regional partnerships with municipalities, businesses, and organizations in the Annapolis Valley.

In 2015, the corporation was rebranded as Glooscap Ventures. It has since managed major commercial initiatives, including the approximately $20 million Glooscap Landing development, renewable energy projects, gaming investments, and seafood operations.

In 2017, Glooscap First Nation received national recognition for its economic initiatives when it was awarded the CANDO Indigenous Community Economic Developer of the Year.

In 2024, Glooscap First Nation became a founding partner of Indigenous Gaming Partners, a multi-nation gaming enterprise.

In 2025, a renewable energy subsidiary of Glooscap Ventures, Glooscap Energy, was recognized at the inaugural Canadian Renewable Energy Association (CanREA) Awards. The company received the award for Indigenous Clean Energy Company of the Year, honoring its participation in wind, solar and energy storage development and its contributions to the renewable energy sector in Canada. Glooscap Energy has partnered with SWEB Development on the development of the Weavers Mountain and Sugar Maple South wind projects in Pictou County, Nova Scotia.

As of 2025 the CEO is Michael Peters.

== Financial controversies ==
In 2010, national media reported on compensation paid to elected officials of Glooscap First Nation, stating that councillors received annual salaries between $210,000 and $260,000, with one councillor reporting significantly higher income in a single fiscal year following the sale of a private business operating on reserve. Then-Chief Shirley Clarke stated that council responsibilities were substantial and demanding. Some Indigenous organizations noted that reported figures may have included reimbursable expenses and business-related income.

In 2015, a manager of a community-owned business was charged with theft exceeding $160,000. The employee, who managed the reserve gas station and gaming centre, was convicted of diverting funds for personal use. The individual was sentenced to two years in prison and ordered to repay $120,000.

== Notable members ==
- Chief Rita Smith (1918–1996) - Political figure
- Amanda Peters - Author
- Danica Roach - Writer
