= Avonport, Nova Scotia =

Community in Nova Scotia, Canada

Coordinates: 45°5′54″N 64°15′12″W

Avonport in Nova Scotia

Avonport is a community in the province of Nova Scotia, Canada, located in Kings County between the mouths of the Avon River and the Gaspereau River. Early settlers included the Fillis and Reid families. It was part of the Horton Township settlement and was known as Horton Point until its name was changed to Avonport in 1864.

The Windsor and Annapolis Railway arrived in 1869, stimulating a number export industries including apple warehouses and a brickyard, later to become Shaw Bricks. In 1911, Minnie Brooks became one of the first female station masters in Canada at the Avonport Station, serving until the 1930s when she was transferred to the important tourist station at Grand Pre.

The area was used as a burial site for the Mi'kmaq, a First Nations people, in the beginning of the 17th century.

Popular tourist destinations are Haliburton's Hill, Wog's Road, and Wiener's Road.

The area holds a considerable amount of agricultural land, including that of Haliburton Farm, Fuller Farm and various vineyards. Fuller Farm is particularly known for growing some of the best Honeycrisp apples in the continent.

Great views of the Minas Basin and Blomidon can be seen from various vantage points in Avonport. Avonport Beach is a popular tourist attraction in the summer.
