= T. T. Vernon Smith =

Thomas Timmis Vernon Smith
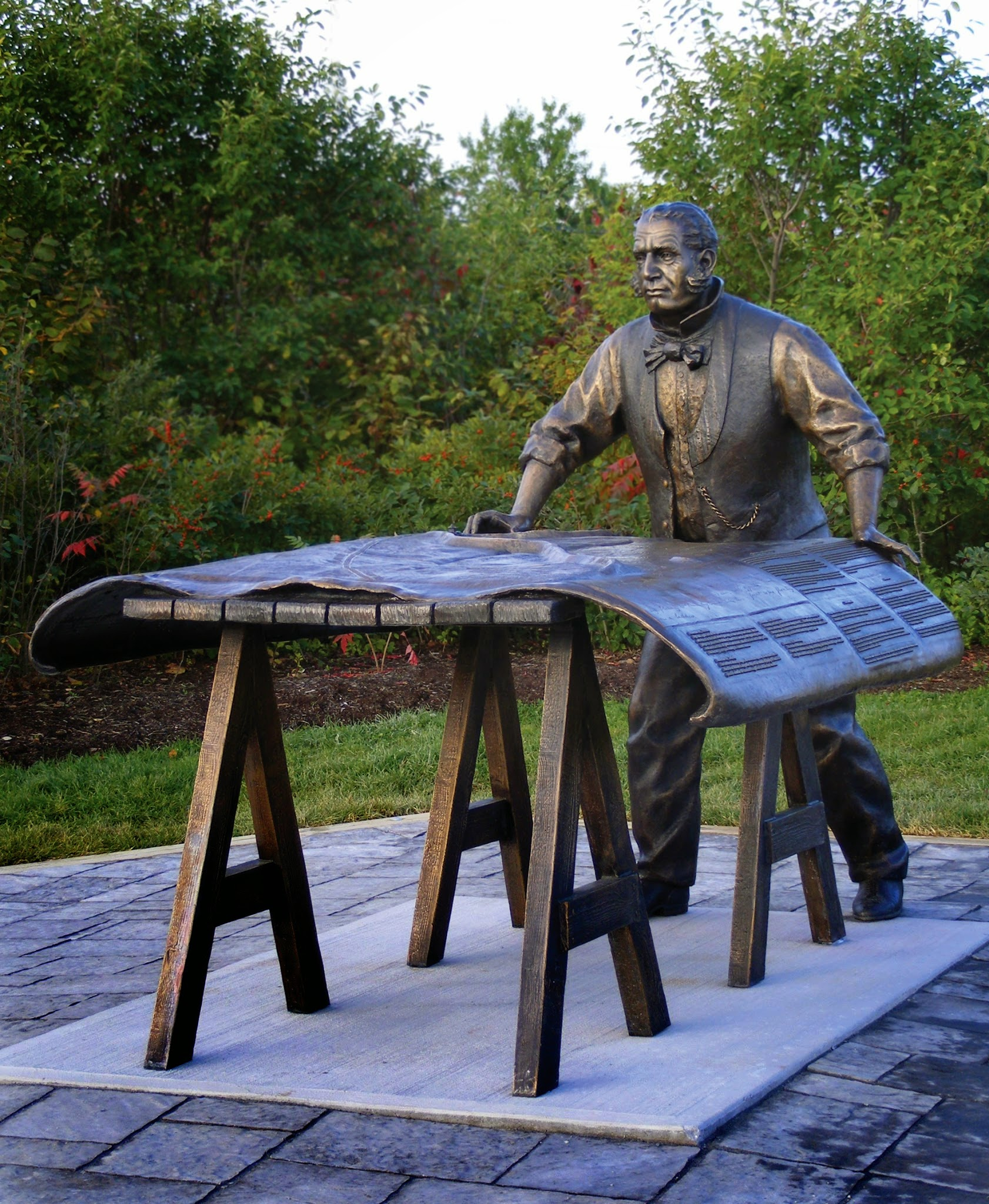
- Work at the Trestle, a sculpture by Ruth Abernethy, depicts entrepreneur and engineer T.T. Vernon Smith. The sculpture was donated to the town of Wolfville, Nova Scotia by Allen Eaves, Vernon Smith's great grandson.
- Born: 1824
- Died: January 15, 1890 (aged 65–66)
- Occupation: Civil engineer

Thomas Timmis Vernon Smith (1824–1890) was a civil engineer who worked on several railways throughout England, Europe and Russia before immigrating to Canada and becoming Chief Engineer on the Windsor and Annapolis Railway project in 1866. The railway opened up accessibility to the Annapolis Valley, and was vital to the establishment of its agricultural industry by enabling the transport of fruit and livestock to global markets. Vernon Smith holds the 1859 patent for the first automated steam-powered foghorn, which known as the Vernon-Smith horn.

== Family history ==
Vernon Smith from one of the oldest families in England connected to the iron and steel trades. Seven generations previously in 1612, as cutlers, the family was named in a Royal Charter granted by King James The First. Vernon Smith's mother was a great-grandniece of Admiral Edward Vernon, after whom George Washington's Virginia estate, Mount Vernon, was named. Vernon Smith's brother founded the UK Iron and Steel Institute. With his father, young Vernon attended the launch of England's pioneer railway in 1830, the Liverpool and Manchester Railway, and he later apprenticed with the makers of its locomotives, George and Robert Stephenson, his father's friends. In 1875, Vernon Smith married Ella Maude Ross from New Ross, Nova Scotia, with whom he had four surviving children. He later lived and consulted from Ottawa. He died of “La Grippe” on January 15, 1890, while completing work in New Brunswick. Vernon Smith is the great-grandfather of Allen C Eaves, a Canadian scientist and entrepreneur.

== Professional life ==
Vernon Smith built railways in Spain, France and Russia before moving to New Brunswick to become Head Engineer of the Woodstock Iron Works in 1852. In 1855 he superintended the construction of the Cobourg and Peterborough Railroad before being promoted to Provincial Engineer by the New Brunswick Board of Trade. During this time he patented the first automated steam-powered foghorn, which has since been adopted in Canada as well as on the English Coasts and elsewhere. The foghorn was constructed at Partridge Island in 1859 as the Vernon-Smith horn, but its invention was later attributed to the Saint John inventor Robert Foulis.

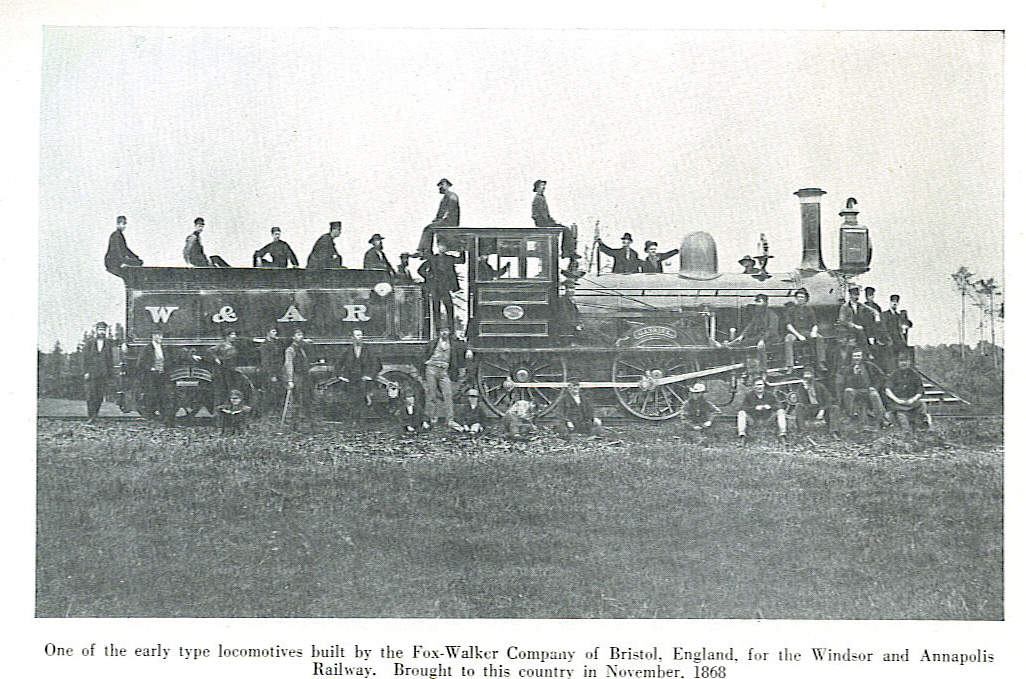
Locomotive Gabriel in Kentville, Nova Scotia, one of the first locomotives imported for the W&AR by Vernon Smith.

In 1861, he returned to England to work on various railway and mining enterprises before returning to Canada in 1866 to build the Windsor and Annapolis Railway in Nova Scotia as Chief Engineer. He managed all aspects of ‘the road’, contracted workers, faced challenging topography and sought funds endlessly to complete contracts. He then built the Western Counties Railway linking Digby to Yarmouth. The railroad was vital to moving Backwards, especially apples, from the Annapolis Valley to American and European ports via Digby and Yarmouth. Smith arranged passenger and freight schedules, walked endless miles during construction and chose a distinctive magenta colour for his locomotives. He was elected a member of the Canadian Society of Civil Engineers (now the Engineering Institute of Canada) in its inaugural year, 1887. Vernon Smith kept a diary throughout his professional life; its 14 volumes are now housed with Nova Scotia Archives and Records Management in Halifax.

== Work at the Trestle ==
Work at the Trestle is a sculpture that depicts Vernon Smith rebuilding the Grand Pre Dyke section of the Windsor and Annapolis Railway following The 1869 Saxby Gale. The storm almost brought financial ruin to the railway shortly after its opening on August 19, 1869. A passage from Vernon Smith's diary, dated October 4 through November 10, 1869, can be seen on Work at the Trestle. The excerpt discusses the devastation brought by the gale to the railway and the local dykes, and the economic stresses ensued.

Work at the Trestle was designed and sculpted by Ruth Abernethy. The sculpture was commissioned by Allen C Eaves, Vernon Smith's great-grandson, and unveiled at Waterfront Park in Wolfville on September 21, 2013. Eaves donated Work at the Trestle to the town of Wolfville to commemorate his great-grandfather's role in helping economic development in the Annapolis Valley using the latest advances in science and technology.
