= Grand-Pré National Historic Site =

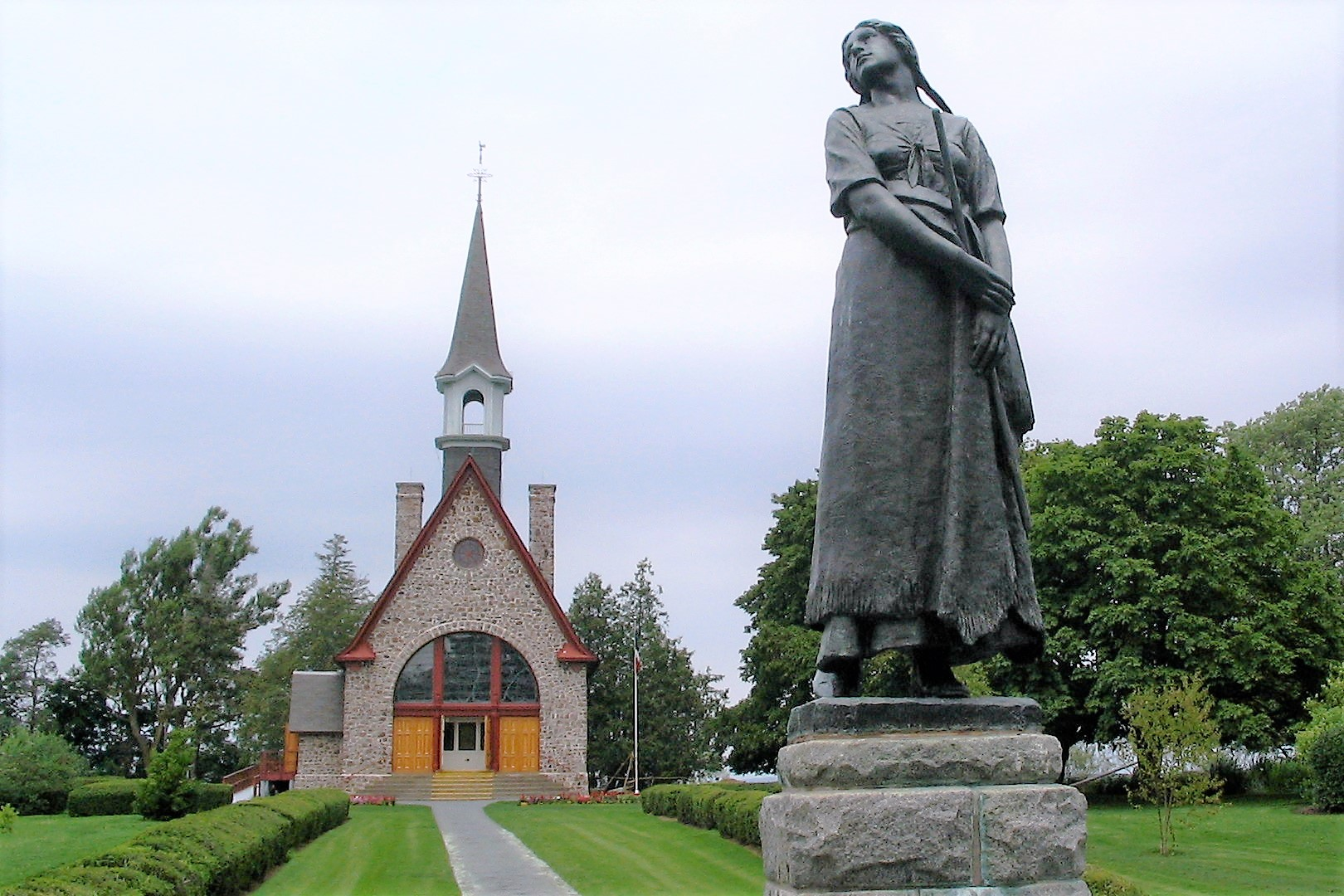
- Statue of Longfellow's Evangeline (by Louis-Philippe Hébert) and memorial church (by René-Arthur Fréchet)

- Location within Nova Scotia
- 45.109444°N 64.310278°W
- Location: Grand-Pré, Nova Scotia

Site notes
- Governing body: Parks Canada

UNESCO World Heritage Site
- Official name: Landscape of Grand Pré
- Type: Cultural
- Criteria: v, vi
- Designated: 2012 (36th session)
- Reference no.: 1404
- Country: Canada
- Region: Europe and North America

National Historic Site of Canada
- Official name: Grand-Pré National Historic Site of Canada
- Designated: 1982

National Historic Site of Canada
- Official name: Grand-Pré Rural Historic District National Historic Site of Canada
- Designated: 1995

Nova Scotia Heritage Property Act
- Type: Heritage Conservation District
- Designated: 1999
- Reference no.: 29MNS0002

Grand-Pré National Historic Site is a park set aside to commemorate the Grand-Pré area of Nova Scotia as a centre of Acadian settlement from 1682 to 1755, and the British deportation of the Acadians that happened during the French and Indian War. The original village of Grand Pré extended four kilometres along the ridge between present-day Wolfville and Hortonville. Grand-Pré is listed as a World Heritage Site and is the main component of two National Historic Sites of Canada.

== History of Settlement ==
Grand-Pré (French for great meadow) is located on the shore of the Minas Basin, an area of tidal marshland, first settled about 1680 by Pierre Melanson dit La Verdure, his wife Marguerite Mius d'Entremont and their five young children who came from nearby Port-Royal, which was the first capital of the French settlement of Acadia (Acadie in French).

Pierre Melanson and the Acadians who joined him in Grand-Pré built dykes there to hold back the tides along the Minas Basin. They created rich pastures for their animals and fertile fields for their crops. Grand-Pré became the bread basket of Acadia, soon outgrowing Port-Royal, and by the mid-18th century was the largest of the numerous Acadian communities around the Bay of Fundy and the coastline of Nova Scotia (Latin for "New Scotland").

=== Colonial Wars ===
During Queen Anne's War, the Raid on Grand Pré (1704) happened and Major Benjamin Church burned the entire village. After the war, in 1713, part of Acadia became Nova Scotia, and Port-Royal, now called Annapolis Royal, became its capital. Over the next 40 years the Acadians refused to sign an unconditional oath of allegiance to the British crown. Some were motivated not to sign for fear of losing their religion, some were afraid of repercussions from their native allies, some did not want to take up arms against the French and others were anti-British (see Military history of the Acadians).

During King George's War the French made numerous attempts to regain Acadia (See Siege of Annapolis Royal (1744) and in 1745). As a result of British attempts to secure their control over the Bay of Fundy region, the French deployed a force (aided by local Acadians, Mi'kmaq and Canadiens) led by Jean-Baptiste Nicolas Roch de Ramezay which defeated a larger British force in a night raid at the Battle of Grand-Pré. This battle was the most significant and bloodiest victory for the French in Acadia. The village, however, remained in British control once the French retreated.

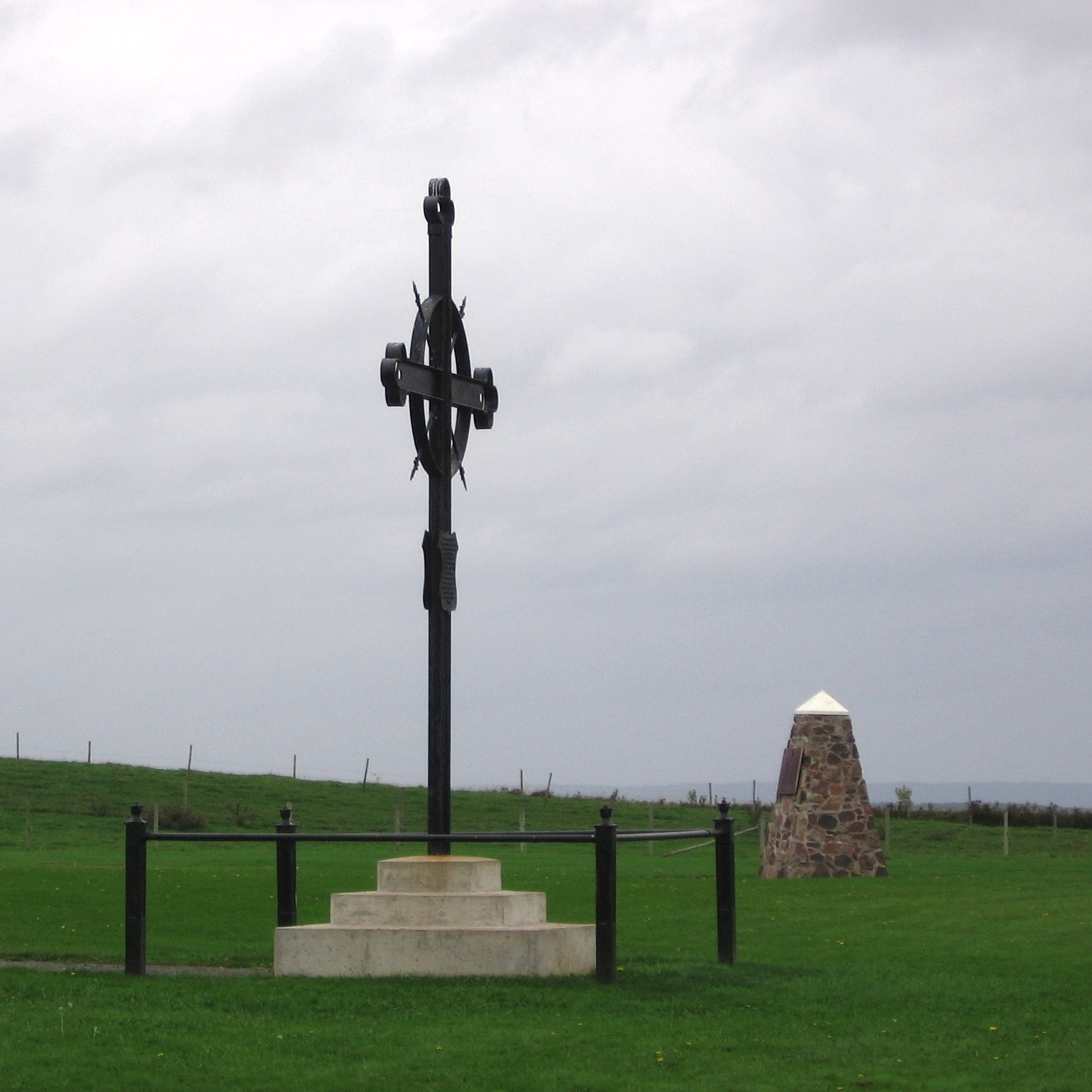
Acadian Memorial Cross, at nearby Hortonville, marking the location of the deportation and the site of Fort Vieux Logis

Father Le Loutre's War began with the establishment of Halifax, which became the new capital for the colony in 1749. The British established Fort Vieux Logis at Grand Pre, which a Mi'kmaq and Acadian militia attacked in the Siege of Grand Pre.

During the French and Indian War, the British sought to neutralize any military threat Acadians might have posed and to interrupt the vital supply lines Acadians provided to Louisbourg and the Mi'kmaq by deporting Acadians from Acadia.

After the Battle of Fort Beauséjour, the British began the removal of the Acadians. During the Bay of Fundy Campaign (1755), Lieutenant Colonel John Winslow arrived in Grand-Pré with troops on August 19, 1755 and took up headquarters in the church. Winslow also built a palisade, which was recently uncovered through archeological research. The men and boys of the area were ordered into the church on September 5. Winslow informed them that all but their personal goods were to be forfeited to the Crown and that they and their families were to be deported as soon as ships arrived to take them away. (At exactly the same time, the Acadians in the neighbouring village of Pisiguit were informed of the same declaration at Fort Edward.)

Some Acadians escaped the deportation and continued their armed resistance against the British throughout the expulsion campaigns. Before the first year was over, however, more than 6,000 Acadians were deported from the Bay of Fundy region. Many villages were burned to the ground to ensure the Acadians would not be able to return. Thousands more would be deported in the second wave of the Expulsion of the Acadians, which involved the deportation of the Acadians from Cape Breton and Prince Edward Island (1758). The deportation continued until England and France made peace in 1763. In all, 12,000 Acadians were deported. Many Acadians died from drowning, starvation, imprisonment, and exposure.

== Evangeline ==
When the poem, Evangeline, by Henry Wadsworth Longfellow was published in the United States in 1847, the story of the Deportation and le Grand Dérangement, the great uprooting, was told to the English-speaking world. Grand-Pré, forgotten for almost a century, became popular for American tourists who wanted to visit the birthplace of the poem's heroine, Evangeline. But nothing remained of the original village except the dykelands and a row of old willows. There is a bust of Henry W. Longfellow on site by Sir Thomas Brock.

== Preservation of the site ==
=== John Frederic Herbin ===
In 1907, John Frederic Herbin, poet, historian, and jeweller, and whose mother was Acadian, purchased the land believed to be the site of the church of Saint-Charles so that it might be protected. The following year the Nova Scotia legislature passed an act to incorporate the Trustees of the Grand-Pré Historic Grounds. Herbin built a stone cross on the site to mark the cemetery of the church, using stones from the remains of what he believed to be Acadian foundations.

=== Dominion Atlantic Railway ===
Herbin sold the property to the Dominion Atlantic Railway in 1917 on the condition that Acadians be involved in its preservation. Acadian history had already become a staple for tourism traffic on the Dominion Atlantic and the Grand Pre site was located beside the railway's mainline. The railway made substantial investments in developing the park and promoting the history and lore of Acadians. Extensive gardens were planted at the site and a small museum was opened. In 1920 the Dominion Atlantic erected a statue of Evangeline conceived by Canadian sculptor Louis-Philippe Hébert and, after his death, finished by his son Henri. The railway deeded a piece of the land and funds were raised to build a memorial church in Grand-Pré. Construction began in the spring of 1922 and the exterior was finished by November. The interior of the church was finished in 1930, the 175th anniversary of the Deportation, and the church opened as a museum.

=== Parks Canada ===
As railway tourism declined in the face of subsidized highway construction, the Dominion Atlantic sold the park to the Canadian federal government in 1957. The Canadian Parks Service took over operation of the park. It was designated a National Historic Site in 1982.

The Visitor Reception and Interpretation Centre features a museum, theatre, gift shop , and multipurpose space. The museum features exhibits about the history of Grand-Pré and Acadia. In the theatre, a video presentation presents the story of the Acadian deportation.

The Visitor Reception and Interpretation Centre, and the Memorial Church are open from mid May through to mid October. However, the gardens remain open year round.

During the season, the Visitor Reception and Interpretation Centre is open 9:00am-5:00pm, while the Memorial Church is open 9:00am-4:45pm. The gardens are open all the time.

The Visitor Reception and Interpretation Centre, and the Memorial Church are not open to dogs with the exception of service dogs. The gardens, however, are open to dogs.

=== Archaeological activities ===
Grand-Pré National Historic Site is also the location of an archaeological site sponsored by St. Mary’s University, Parks Canada, and Sociéte Promotion Grand-Pré. While excavations have been undertaken by Parks Canada since 1971, the field school has been operational for ten years, during which archaeologists have identified the cemetery for the Acadian period, the cellar of an Acadian house immediately to the east of the Memorial Church, and has conducted test pits throughout the site looking for evidence of the parish church, St-Charles-des-Mines; Pierre-Alain Bugeauld (Bujold) was the Church Warden [Marguillier aux Mines]; was also a Notary (1706) and a Judge/Justice (1707). Acadian artefacts that have been unearthed include fragments of Saintonge ceramic, nails, wine bottle glass, window pane glass, a 1711 French silver coin, spoons, belt buckles, buttons, clay pipes, etc. There seems to also be evidence of the occupation by New England troops, as well as considerable evidence of the New England Planter occupation period beginning in 1760.

== Historic designations ==
The "Landscape of Grand Pré" was listed as a World Heritage Site by UNESCO on June 30, 2012, having been added to Canada's tentative list of potential World Heritage Sites in 2004. The 1,300 hectares (3,200 acres) of polderised marshland and archaeological sites in the Grand-Pré area were recognized as an "exceptional example of the adaptation of the first European settlers to the conditions of the North American Atlantic coast" and as "a memorial to Acadian way of life and deportation".

In 1982, on the 300th anniversary of the arrival of the first Acadians in the region in 1682, the Grand-Pré memorial park was designated the "Grand-Pré National Historic Site" in commemoration of the settlement and later deportation of the Acadians. In 1995, the site and surrounding region were designated the "Grand-Pré Rural Historic District National Historic Site" in honour of the rural cultural landscape which features one of the oldest land occupation and use patterns of European origin in Canada.

The "Grand Pré Heritage Conservation District" was designated under the provincial Heritage Property Act in 1999, and encompasses the area in and around the hamlet of Grand-Pré as well as the Grand-Pré National Historic Site.

== See also ==
- Nova Scotia Heritage Day
