= Robert Foulis (inventor) =

Canadian artist, engineer and inventor

- Born: May 5, 1796; Glasgow, Scotland
- Died: January 28, 1866

Robert Foulis (1796– January 28, 1866) was a Canadian inventor, civil engineer and artist noted for his invention of the steam-powered foghorn.

== Early life ==
Robert Foulis was born May 5, 1796, in Glasgow, Scotland. After training in engineering, he moved to Belfast, where he met his first wife, Elizabeth Leatham. After Elizabeth's death in childbirth in 1817, Foulis determined to move to the United States. Leaving his newborn daughter with a great-aunt (who would later join him), he set sail for the US. Due to a storm, his ship had to put in to Halifax, Nova Scotia, where Scottish friends convinced him to stay. Sources vary on his date of arrival in Halifax, with both 1818 and 1819 possible. In Halifax he taught drawing classes and painted portraits in oil.

== Life in Saint John ==
In 1820 settled in Saint John, New Brunswick, where he was appointed deputy land surveyor in 1822. After he surveyed the upper Saint John River for the feasibility of steamshipping, he became involved with the buildings of several early steamboats and the first Saint John harbour ferry.

In 1825, Foulis founded the Saint John Foundry, the province's second iron foundry. He continued his interest in art, founding a School of Arts in 1838.

In 1852, Foulis invented an apparatus to produce coal gas from the distillation of albertite; (Note: His New Brunswick contemporary and compatriot, Abraham Pineo Gesner, would use albertite to perfect his own distillation technique to produce kerosene, first demonstrated in 1846. The two disputed the primacy of their methods in court, but Foulis lost.) his intention was that the gas could be used instead of whale oil when illuminating lighthouses. Foulis installed the system in the Partridge island lighthouse in 1853.

The invention that would bring Foulis his greatest recognition was the steam-powered foghorn. In 1853, as he was walking towards his house on a foggy night, he heard his daughter playing her piano. Noticing he could only hear the very low notes of the piano, he realized that a device that emitted low frequency sound could be used to warn ships approaching the Saint harbour in the dense fog. He spent the next six years trying to convince the New Brunswick lighthouse commissioners to allow him to install his foghorn design on the nearby Partridge Island. In 1859 permission for the foghorn to be installed on Partridge Island was granted to the engineer T. T. Vernon Smith, who had obtained Foulis' plans. The foghorn went into service on Partridge island, and a patent dispute between the two men followed. He ultimately failed to obtain any patent rights to his foghorn design, although the provincial legislature recognized him as the rightful inventor.

Following business ventures of varying success, Foulis died in poverty.
