= Foghorn =

Device using sound to warn shipping in fog

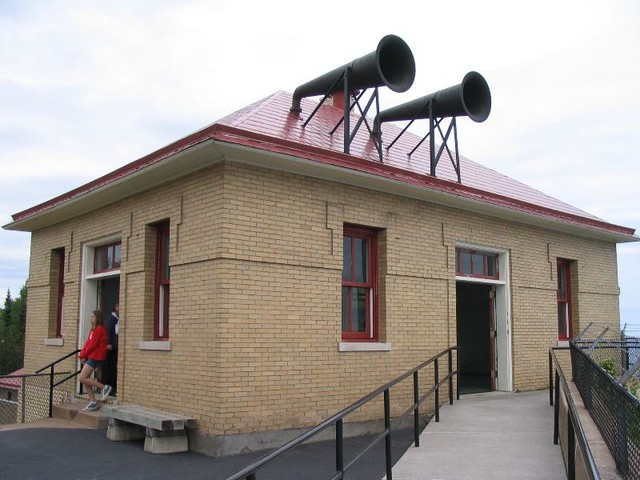
Two roof-mounted diaphone foghorns at Split Rock Lighthouse

A foghorn or fog signal is a device that uses sound to warn vehicles of navigational hazards such as rocky coastlines, or boats of the presence of other vessels, in foggy conditions. The term is most often used in relation to marine transport. When visual navigation aids such as lighthouses are obscured, foghorns provide an audible warning of rock outcrops, shoals, headlands, or other dangers to shipping.

== Description ==
All foghorns use a vibrating column of air to create an audible tone, but the method of setting up this vibration differs. Some horns, such as the Daboll trumpet, used vibrating plates or metal reeds, a similar principle to a modern electric car horn. Others used air forced through holes in a rotating cylinder or disk, in the same manner as a siren. Semi-automatic operation of foghorns was achieved by using a clockwork mechanism (or "coder") to sequentially open the valves admitting air to the horns; each horn was given its own timing characteristics to help mariners identify them.

== History ==
=== Early fog signals ===
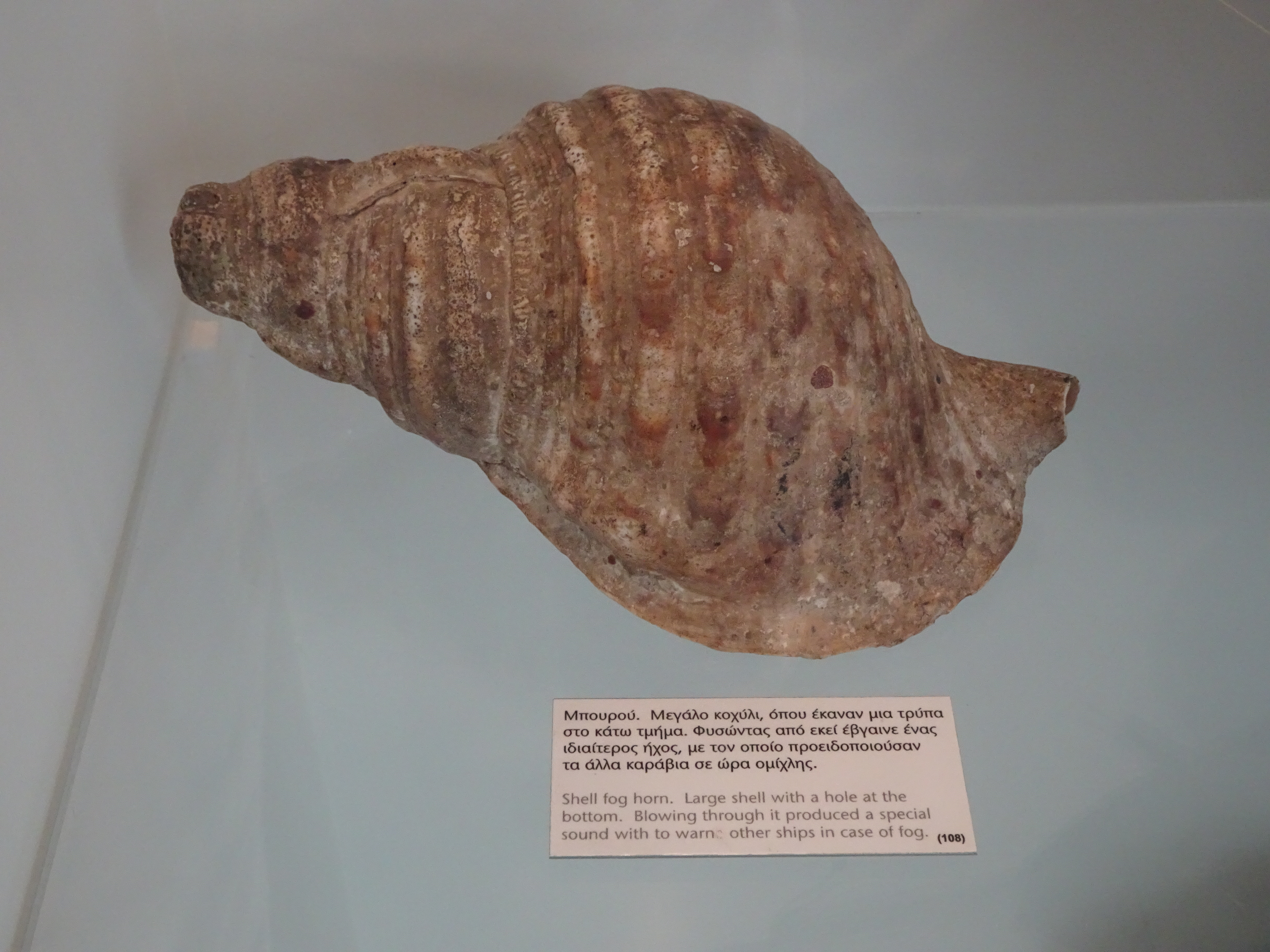
Foghorn made with a marine shell, with a hole on its narrowest side

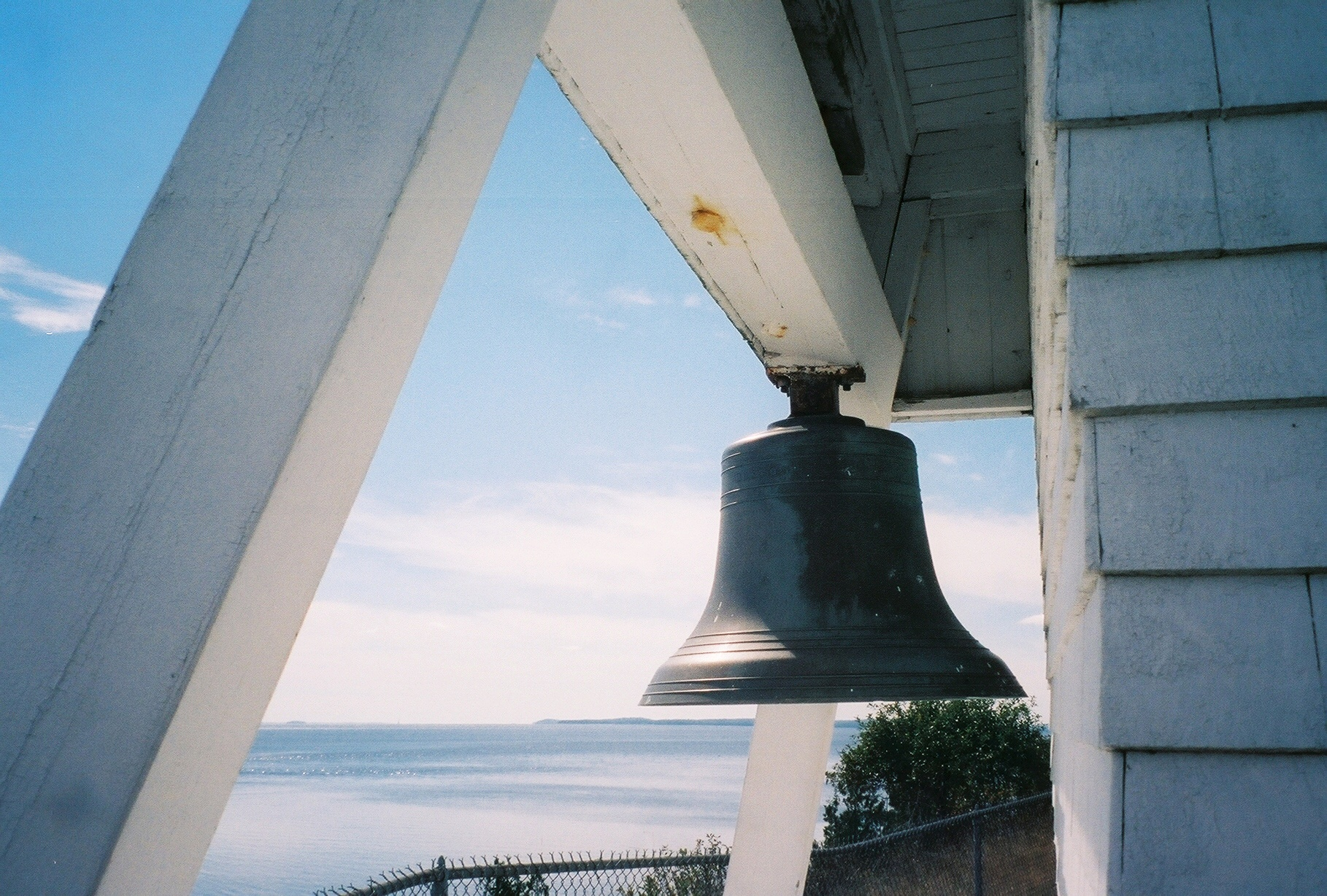
An early form of fog signal: the fog bell at Fort Point Light Station, Maine

Audible fog signals have been used in one form or another for hundreds of years, initially simply seashell horns, fog bells or gongs struck manually.

At some lighthouses, a small cannon was let off periodically to warn away ships, but this was labor-intensive and dangerous. In the United States, whistles were also used where a source of steam power was available, though Trinity House, the British lighthouse authority, did not employ them, preferring an explosive signal.

Throughout the 19th century, efforts were made to automate the signalling process. Trinity House eventually developed a system (the "Signal, Fog, Mk I") for firing a gun-cotton charge electrically. However, the charge had to be manually replaced after each signal. At Portland Bill, for example, which had a five-minute interval between fog-signals, this meant the horns had to be lowered, the two new charges inserted, and the horns raised again every five minutes during foggy periods.

Clockwork systems were also developed for striking bells. Struck bells were developed throughout the 1800s with the use of a governor, including the use of a large triangle with 4-foot sides in Maine in 1837. Ships were required to carry bells, with an exemption for Turkish ships because Islam forbade the use of bells.

=== Mechanization ===
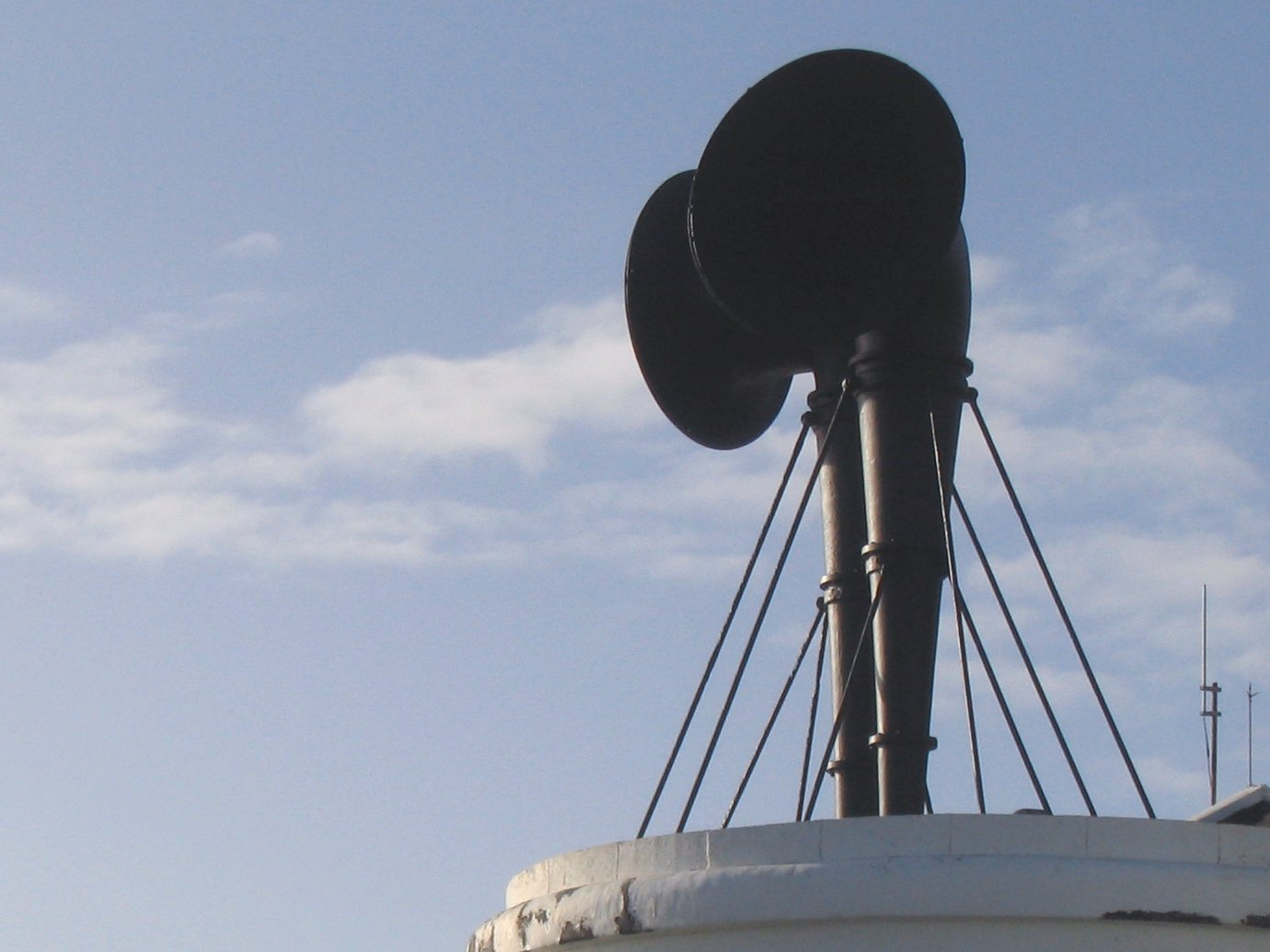
Fog siren at the Lizard Lighthouse, Cornwall

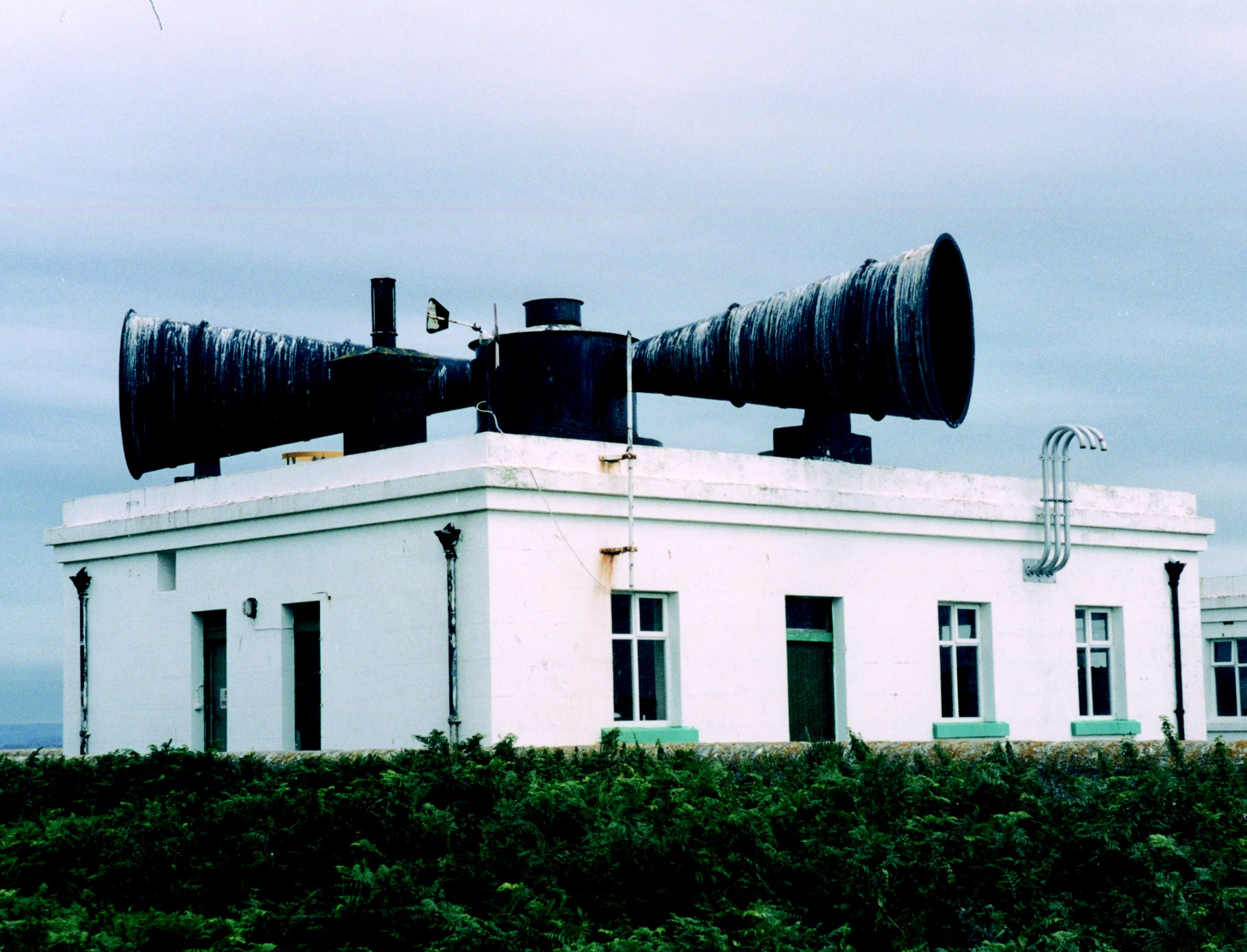
Another Trinity House fog siren installation, on Flat Holm

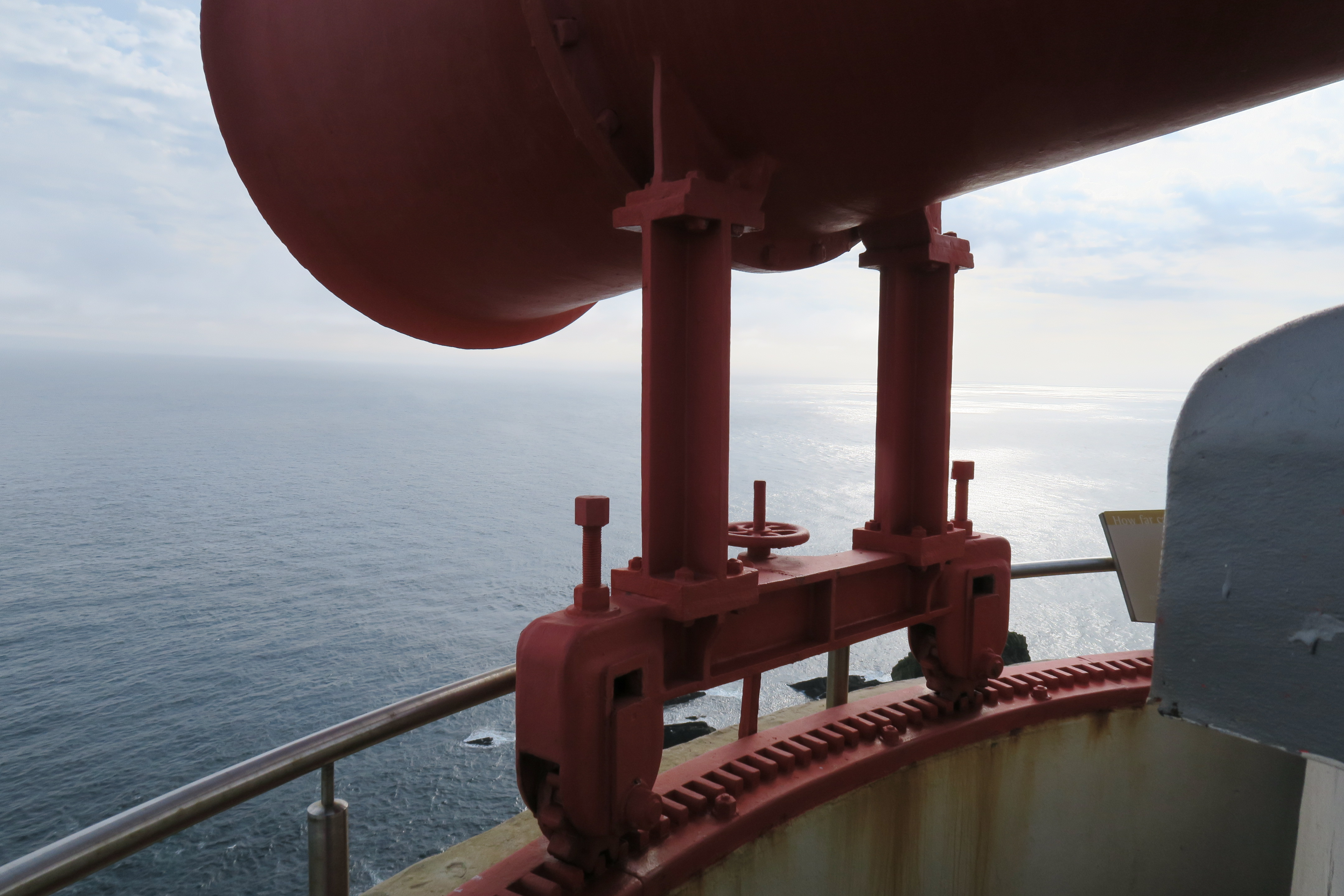
Bearing mechanism of Sumburgh lighthouse foghorn (Shetland)

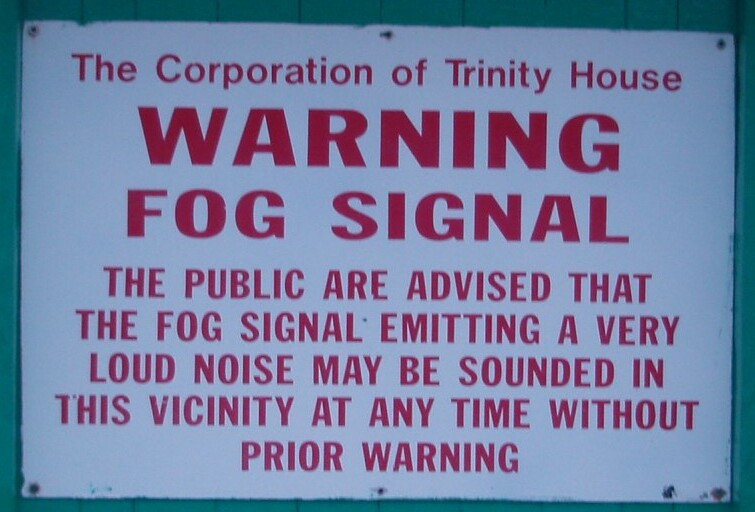
Trinity House warning notice

The first automated steam-powered foghorn was invented by Robert Foulis, a Scotsman who emigrated to Saint John, New Brunswick, Canada. Foulis is said to have heard his daughter playing the piano in the distance on a foggy night, and noticed the low notes were more audible than the higher notes: he then designed a device to produce a low-frequency sound, as well as a code system for use with it. Foulis repeatedly presented his concept to the Commissioners of Light Houses for the Bay of Fundy for installation on Partridge Island. While the Commissioners initially rejected Foulis's plan, one commissioner eventually encouraged Foulis to submit detailed plans to the Commission. For reasons unknown, the plans were given to another Canadian engineer, T. T. Vernon Smith, who officially submitted them to the Commissioners as his own. The foghorn was constructed at Partridge Island in 1859 as the Vernon-Smith horn. After protest by Foulis and a legislative inquiry, Foulis was credited as the true inventor, but he never patented or profited from his invention.

Captain James William Newton in England claimed to have been the inventor of the fog signalling technique using loud and low notes.

The development of fog signal technology continued apace at the end of the 19th century. During the same period an inventor, Celadon Leeds Daboll, developed a coal-powered foghorn called the Daboll trumpet for the American lighthouse service, though it was not universally adopted. A few Daboll trumpets remained in use until the mid-20th century.

In the United Kingdom, experiments to develop more-effective foghorns were carried out by John Tyndall and Lord Rayleigh, amongst others. The latter's ongoing research for Trinity House culminated in a design for a siren with a large trumpet designed to achieve maximum sound propagation (see reference for details of the Trials of Fog Signals), installed in Trevose Head Lighthouse, Cornwall in 1913. One reporter, after hearing a steam-powered siren for the first time, described it as having "a screech like an army of panthers, weird and prolonged, gradually lowering in note until after half a minute it becomes the roar of a thousand mad bulls, with intermediate voices suggestive of the wail of a lost soul, the moan of a bottomless pit and the groan of a disabled elevator."

One of the first automated fog bells was the Stevens Automatic Bell Striker.

Some later fog bells were placed underwater, particularly in especially dangerous areas, so that their sound (which would be a predictable code, such as the number "23") would be carried further and reverberate through the ship's hull. For example, this technique was used at White Shoal Light (Michigan). This was an earlier precursor to RACON.

=== Diaphone ===
From the early 20th century an improved device called the diaphone, originally invented as an organ stop by Robert Hope-Jones and developed as a fog signal by John Northey of Toronto, became the standard foghorn apparatus for new installations worldwide. Diaphones were powered by compressed air and could emit extremely powerful low-frequency notes.

Sound of the diaphone at East Brother Island Light, Richmond, California

The foghorn's musical connection extended beyond its use of pipe-organ technology. In 1982, for example, the Dutch broadcaster VPRO aired a live "foghorn concert" on national radio, relaying the sound of foghorns from Emden, Calais, Nieuwpoort, Scheveningen, Den Helder, Lelystad, Urk, Marken and Kornwerderzand, mixed with studio music by sound artist Alvin Curran.

=== Obsolescence ===
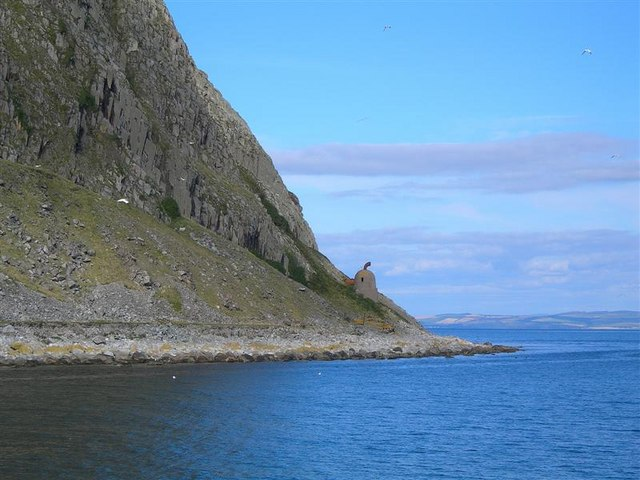
Foghorn on Ailsa Craig, where the fog signal was discontinued in 1966

Since automation of lighthouses became common in the 1960s and 1970s most older foghorn installations have been removed to avoid the need to run their complex machinery and replaced with electrically powered diaphragm or compressed air horns. Activation is completely automated: a laser or photo beam is shot out to sea and if the beam reflects back to the source (i.e. the laser beam is visible due to fog or precipitation) the sensor sends a signal to activate the foghorn. In many cases modern navigational aids, including GPS, have rendered large, long-range foghorns completely unnecessary according to the International Association of Lighthouse Authorities.
