= Grand-Pré, Nova Scotia =

Grand-Pré
- Community
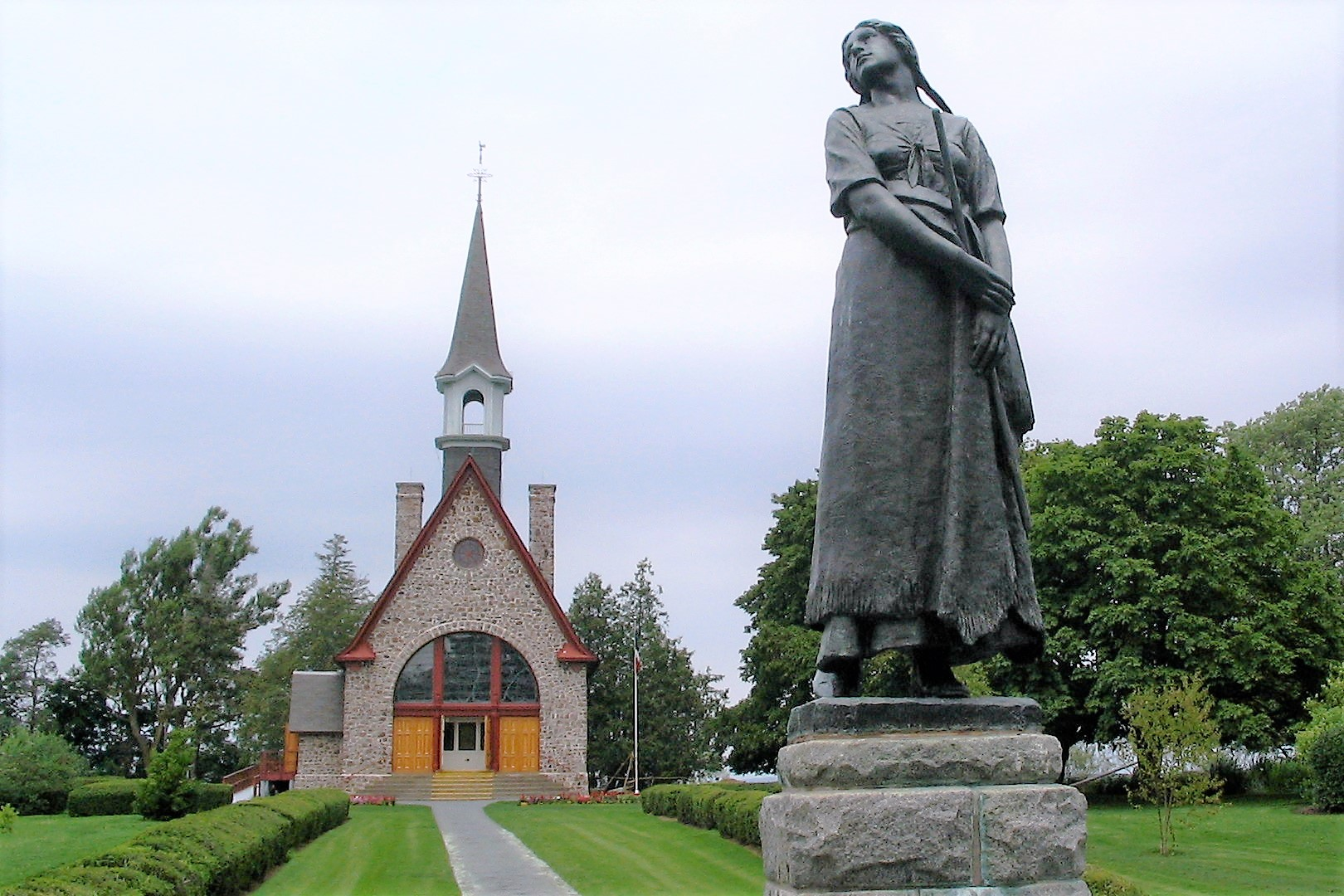
- Grand-Pré National Historic Site

- Location of Grand-Pré Grand-Pré (Canada)
- Coordinates: 45°06′18.14″N 64°17′55.26″W
- Country: Canada
- Province: Nova Scotia
- County: Kings County
- Established: 1680
- Electoral Districts Federal: Kings County
- Provincial: Kings County
- Elevation: 0–92 m (0–302 ft)
- Time zone: UTC−04:00 (AST)
  - Summer (DST): UTC−04:00 (ADT)
- Postal code(s): B4P
- Area code: 902
- NTS Map: 021N08
- GNBC Code: DALZZ
- Website: Société Promotion Grand-Pré - The National Historic Site

UNESCO World Heritage Site
- Official name: Landscape of Grand Pré
- Type: Cultural
- Criteria: v, vi
- Designated: 2012 (36th session)
- Reference no.: 1404
- Region: Europe and North America

Grand-Pré (French: [ɡʁɑ̃pʁe]) is a rural community in Kings County, Nova Scotia, Canada. Its French name translates to "Great/Large Meadow" and the community lies at the eastern edge of the Annapolis Valley several kilometres east of the town of Wolfville on a peninsula jutting into the Minas Basin surrounded by extensive dyked farm fields, framed by the Gaspereau and Cornwallis Rivers. The community was made famous by Henry Wadsworth Longfellow's poem Evangeline and is today home to the Grand-Pré National Historic Site. On June 30, 2012, the Landscape of Grand-Pré was named a World Heritage Site by UNESCO.

== History ==
Grand-Pré was founded around 1680 by Pierre Melanson and Pierre Terriot. Pierre Melanson came from the principal Acadian settlement at Port Royal. He was an Acadian of French Huguenot and English extraction, having arrived at Port Royal with Sir Thomas Temple in the 1650s when Acadia was under English control. Pierre Terriot was the son of Jehan born in Port Royal around 1654. Pierre Melanson was responsible for founding the parish of Saint-Charles des Mines while his friend, Pierre Terriot founded the parish of Saint-Joseph de la rivière aux Canards. The fertility of the soils and wealth of other resources in the area had been known to the French since the early part of the century when Samuel de Champlain, de Mons's cartographer, had surveyed the region. Despite its fertility, the region's development was slow due to conflicting ownership claims to the Seigneury of Les Mines between Michel Leneuf de la Vallière de Beaubassin and Alexandre Le Borgne de Belle-Isle. In 1686, the Intendant of New France, Jacques de Meulles, ruled in favour of Belle-Isle, clarifying the legal status of the Seigneury and facilitating further settlement. The new arrivals from Port Royal quickly employed their dyke building technology to the vast salt marshes; effectively reclaiming several thousand acres of productive farm land. The farms and the population grew quickly, making Grand-Pré the principal settlement in Acadia. Settlements spread from Grand-Pré around the Minas Basin, collectively becoming known as Les Mines or Minas after the copper deposits surveyed by de Mons at the entrance to the Basin. By the mid-1680s the population was sufficient to support a church and the parish of Saint-Charles des Mines was formed.

=== Queen Anne's War ===
==== Raid on Grand-Pré (1704) ====
During Queen Anne's War, New Englander Ranger Benjamin Church, burned the village and broke some of the dykes in the Raid on Grand Pré. In this raid, Church and his rangers got stuck on the mud flats of Baie Francais (Bay of Fundy), which gave the Mi'kmaq and Acadians time to position themselves to fiercely defend the village. They were eventually overwhelmed and Church burned the village and the fields.

=== King George's War ===
==== Battle of Grand-Pré (1747) ====
During King George's War, a French force led by Jean-Baptiste Nicolas Roch de Ramezay defeated a larger British force in a night raid at the Battle of Grand-Pré. This battle was the most significant and bloodiest victory for the French in Acadia. The village, however, remained in British control once the French retreated.

=== Father Le Loutre's War ===
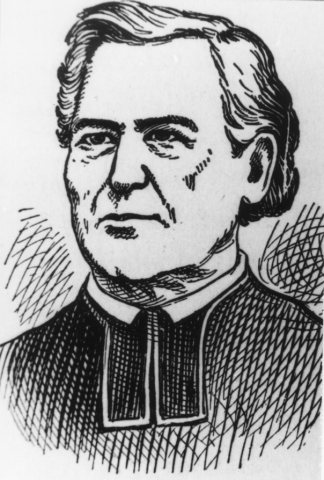
Father Le Loutre

==== Acadian Exodus (1749-1755) ====
During Father Le Loutre's War, the Acadians at Grand-Pré played a significant role in supporting the Acadian Exodus out of mainland Nova Scotia, which started in 1749. Grand-Pré willingly responded to the call from Le Loutre for basic food stuffs. The bread basket of the region, they raised wheat and other grains, produced flour in no fewer than eleven mills, and sustained herds of several thousand head of cattle, sheep and hogs. Regular cattle droves made their way over a road from Cobequid to Tatamagouche for the supply of Fort Beauséjour, Louisbourg, and settlements on Île St. Jean (Prince Edward Island). Other exports went by sea from Minas Basin to Isthmus of Chignecto or to the mouth of the Saint John River, carried in Acadian vessels by Acadian middlemen. The Acadians from Grand-Pré also offered their labour to those at Isthmus of Chignecto to build a church and dykes.

==== Siege of Grand-Pré (1749) ====
The British built Fort Vieux Logis in the area during Father Le Loutre's War, which was attacked by the Acadians and Mi'kmaq in the Siege of Grand-Pré. The siege lasted for a week and the 300 natives took prisoners who remained in captivity for almost two years. Eventually the Mi'kmaq retreated.

=== French and Indian War ===
==== Bay of Fundy Campaign (1755) ====
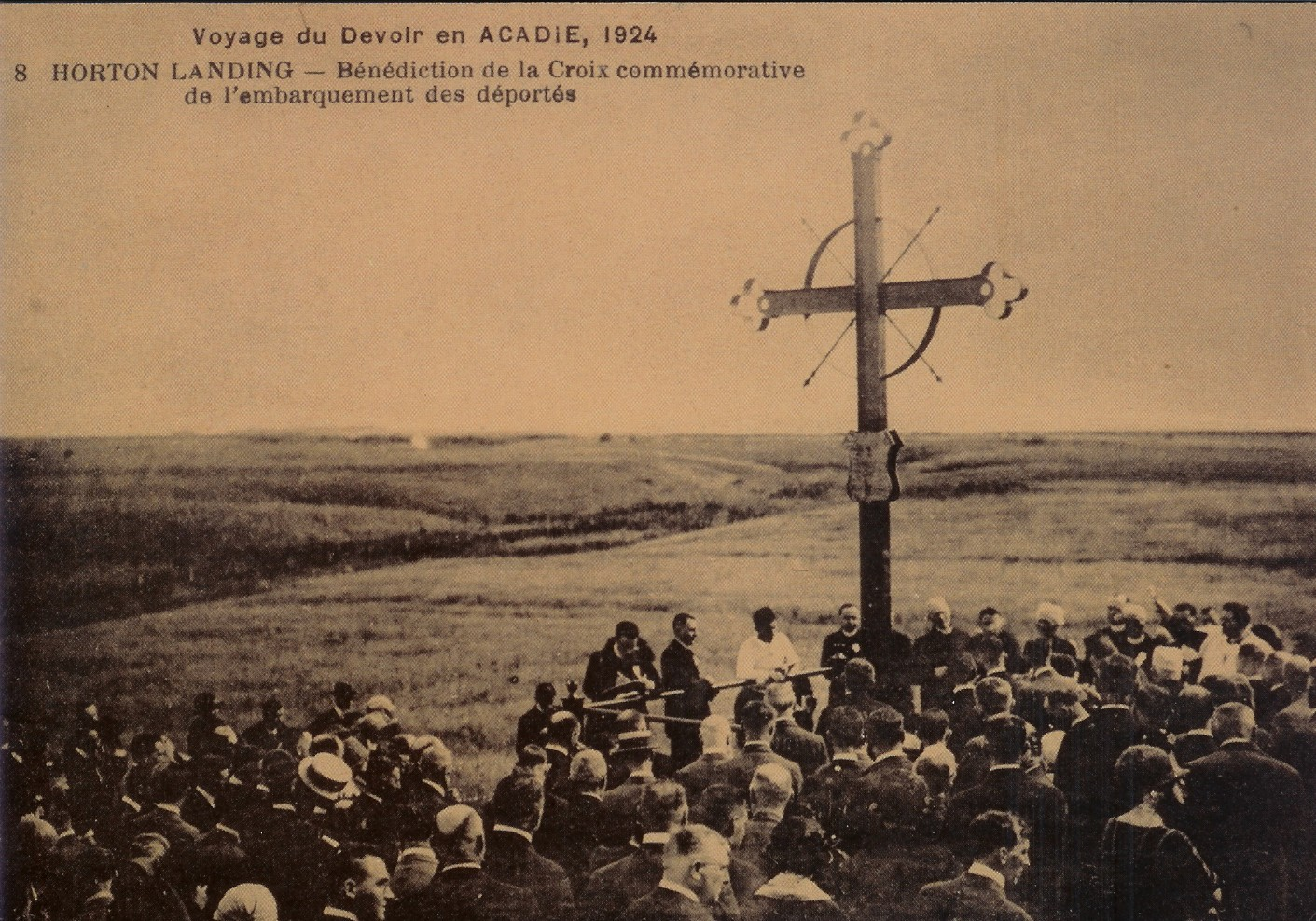
Acadian Memorial Cross, Grand-Pré

During the French and Indian War (the North American theatre of the Seven Years' War), the Acadians were expelled from Grand-Pré during the Bay of Fundy Campaign (1755). There were various British soldiers who kept a journal of the deportation from Grand-Pré such as Lieutenant Colonel John Winslow and Jeremiah Bancroft. The site of Grand-Pré during the expulsion was later immortalized by American poet Henry Wadsworth Longfellow with his epic poem Evangeline.

Acadians from Grand Pré were dispersed in many locations and some eventually returned to other parts of the Canadian Maritimes such as Nova Scotia, Newfoundland and New Brunswick. Many Acadians expelled from the Grand-Pré area eventually settled in the New England States and travelling overland to South Louisiana in the United States after being dropped on the Atlantic coast. In Louisiana, the term Cajun evolved from the name Acadian.

==== New England Planters ====
After the deportation of the Acadians, the vacant lands were resettled by New England Planters in 1760 and renamed Horton Township. A large town plot with a rectilinear street grid was laid between Grand-Pré and Horton Landing to the east, but the local farming population preferred to settle along the upland ridge in a spread out fashion, much like the previous residents of the area, the Acadians, had done. Several schools and congregations were formed at Grand-Pré including a meeting house converted into a church in the early 19th century, today known as the Covenanter Church. Over time, merchants and shop owners congregated at nearby Wolfville to the west, leaving Grand-Pré to continue as a farming community. One of the Planter descendants was Sir Robert Borden, the eighth Prime Minister of Canada, who was born in Grand-Pré in 1854. Grand-Pré continued as a rich and productive but small farming community. The Windsor and Annapolis Railway arrived in 1869, at first serving the community with a small rural station. Livestock and marsh hay became major exports, joined in the late 19th century by the Annapolis Valley's major apple exporting industry. Four large apple warehouses were built around the station to pack and ship apples. In the 1920s when the Dominion Atlantic Railway developed the Grand-Pré Memorial Park to attract tourists. While agriculture remained Grand-Pré's major industry, the park made the community a tourism destination as well as a memorial to the Acadian people. The Park eventually became a National Historic Site and in 1957 was purchased by the Canadian Park Service.

== Economy and culture ==
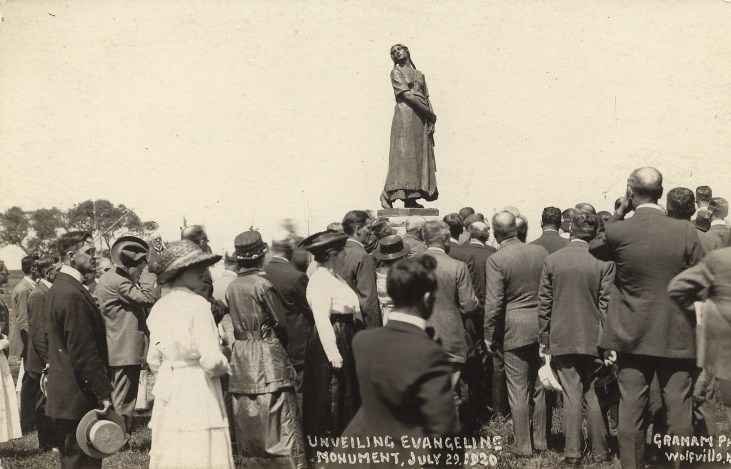
Unveiling of Evangeline (1920) by famed Quebec sculptor Louis-Philippe Hébert, completed posthumously by his son Henry

Today, Grand-Pré is the home the Grand-Pré National Historic Site which is now a national park administered by Parks Canada to commemorate the Acadian people and their deportation. The Covenanter Church at Grand-Pré is the oldest existing Presbyterian church in Nova Scotia. One of Nova Scotia's best known wineries, Domaine de Grand-Pré, is located in the community. Grand-Pré is also Canada's first designated Historic Rural District. The Just Us! coffee company headquarters is located in the village and is something of a tourist attraction. Evangeline Beach is a famous stopover for thousands of migrating shore birds and is also a fine vantage point for watching the ebb and flow of the world's highest tides.

== Demographics ==
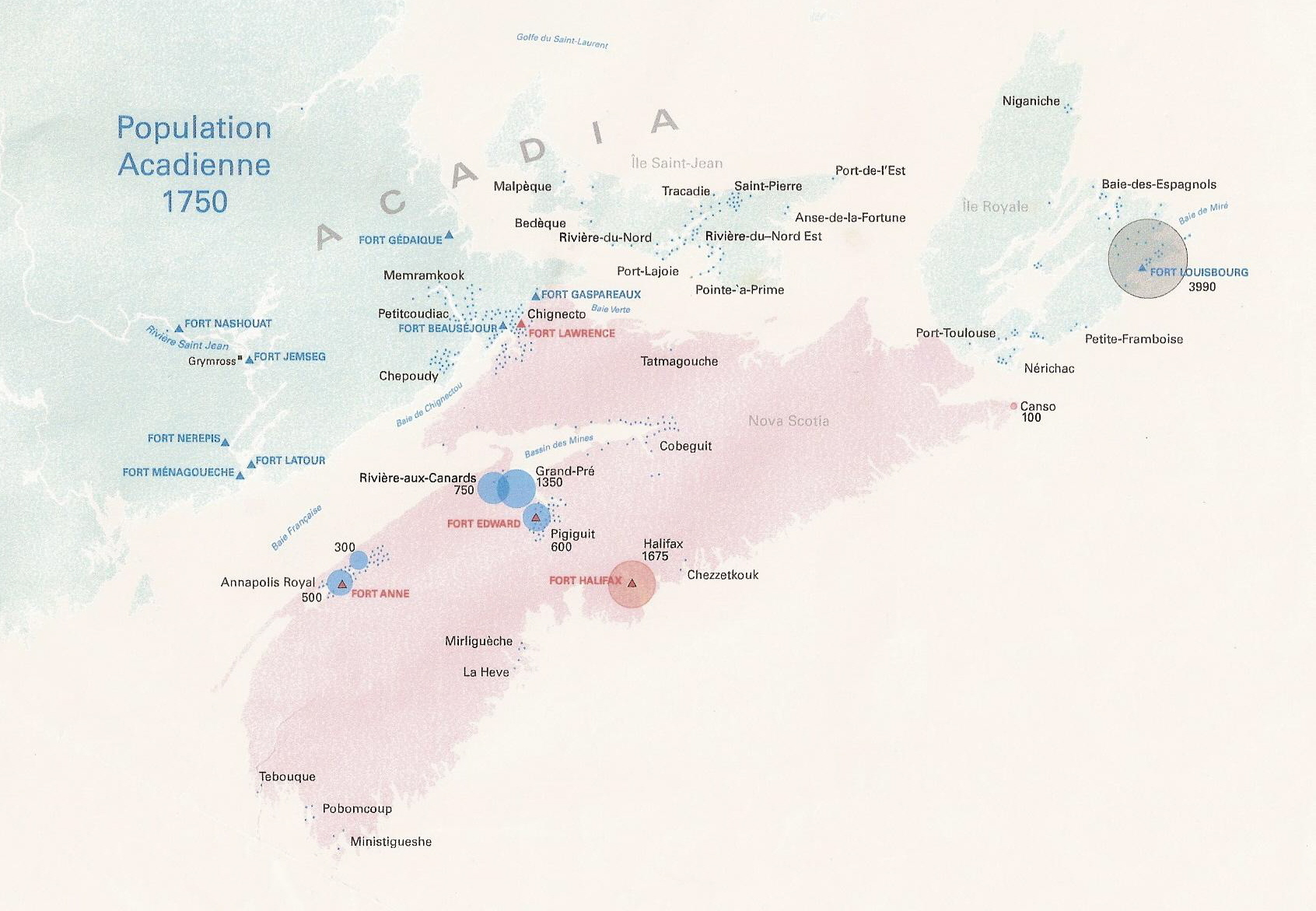
Distribution of the Acadian population in 1750

Grand-Pré has no official status; there are only specific data for subdivision D of Kings County, which includes the area between Hantsport and Wolfville, where Grand-Pré and a few other villages exist. In this area, there were 5499 inhabitants in 2006, compared to 5167 in 2001, an increase of 6.4%. The average age is 44.5, compared to 41.8 for the province. 84.8% of the population is older than 15 years, which is in the provincial average.

With regard to language, 96.6% of the inhabitants are English-speaking, 1.4% are francophone and 2.0% are allophones. The francophone population is anglicized as 99.3% of the population speak English at home. With respect to knowledge of official languages, 7.2% of the population can communicate in French at various levels, the rest being unilingual anglophone.

== Notable people ==
Grand-Pré is the birthplace of Prime Minister Sir Robert Borden.
