= Gaspereau Lake =

Lake in Kings County, Nova Scotia, Canada

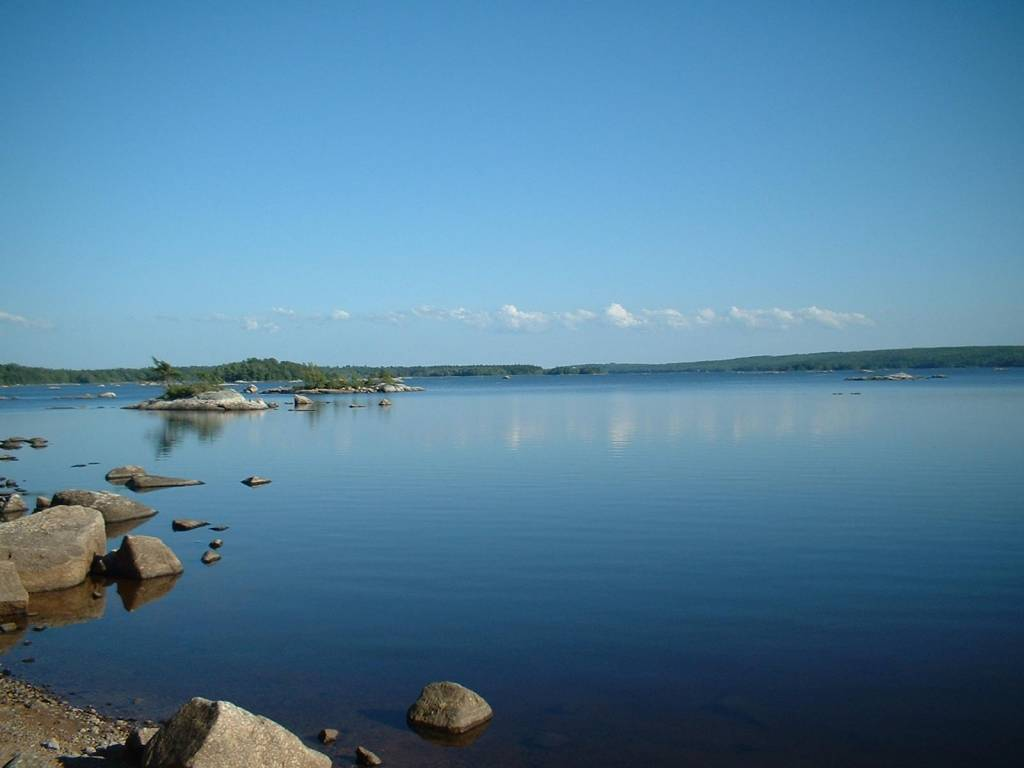
- View from north shore

- Location within Nova Scotia
- Location: Kings County, Nova Scotia
- Coordinates: 44°59′N 64°32′W
- Primary outflows: Gaspereau River
- Basin countries: Canada
- Max. length: 12 km (7.5 mi)
- Max. width: 7 km (4.3 mi)
- Surface area: 22 km^{2} (8.5 sq mi)
- Shore length^{1}: 55 km (34 mi)
- Surface elevation: 185 m (607 ft)
- Frozen: 3 months
- Islands: 50
- Settlements: Welton Landing, Nova Scotia
- ^{1} Shore length is not a well-defined measure.

Gaspereau Lake is a lake in Kings County, Nova Scotia, Canada, about 10 km south of the town of Kentville, Nova Scotia on the South Mountain. It is the largest lake in Kings County, and the fifth largest lake in Nova Scotia. The lake is shallow with dozens of forested islands and hundreds of rocky islets (skerries).

The water level of the lake is controlled by Nova Scotia Power. At the natural outlet to the Gaspereau River, in the north-east corner of the lake, there is a control dam and fish ladder. Another control dam at the south-east corner of the lake controls outflow to a canal which diverts water to hydroelectricity stations on the lower sections of the Gaspereau River system.

In late spring the namesake fish, gaspereau (alewife) migrate from the ocean up the Gaspereau River, and spawn in the shallow waters of Gaspereau Lake.

== Archaeological Significance ==
The Gaspereau Lake Reservoir Site Complex is a cluster of archaeological sites on the shore of Gaspereau Lake. Possibly dating as early as 10,000 years ago, the sites show continuous occupation from at least 5000 years ago until after European contact 500 years ago. The largest of the sites, the End of Dyke Site, is the largest site in the Maine–Maritimes Region when measured by artifact density. Artifacts retrieved from the site include lithics (stone flakes, projectile points, and scrapers), ground stone tools, ceramics, copper, red ochre paintstones, shark's teeth, and faunal remains, among others. Numerous hearth features were identified. The Gaspereau River, which drains Gaspereau Lake, also hosts significant archaeological resources. Both areas contain large amounts of toolstone specific to the Minas Basin in the Bay of Fundy, indicating that toolstone was transported in large numbers up the Gaspereau River and worked into artifacts.

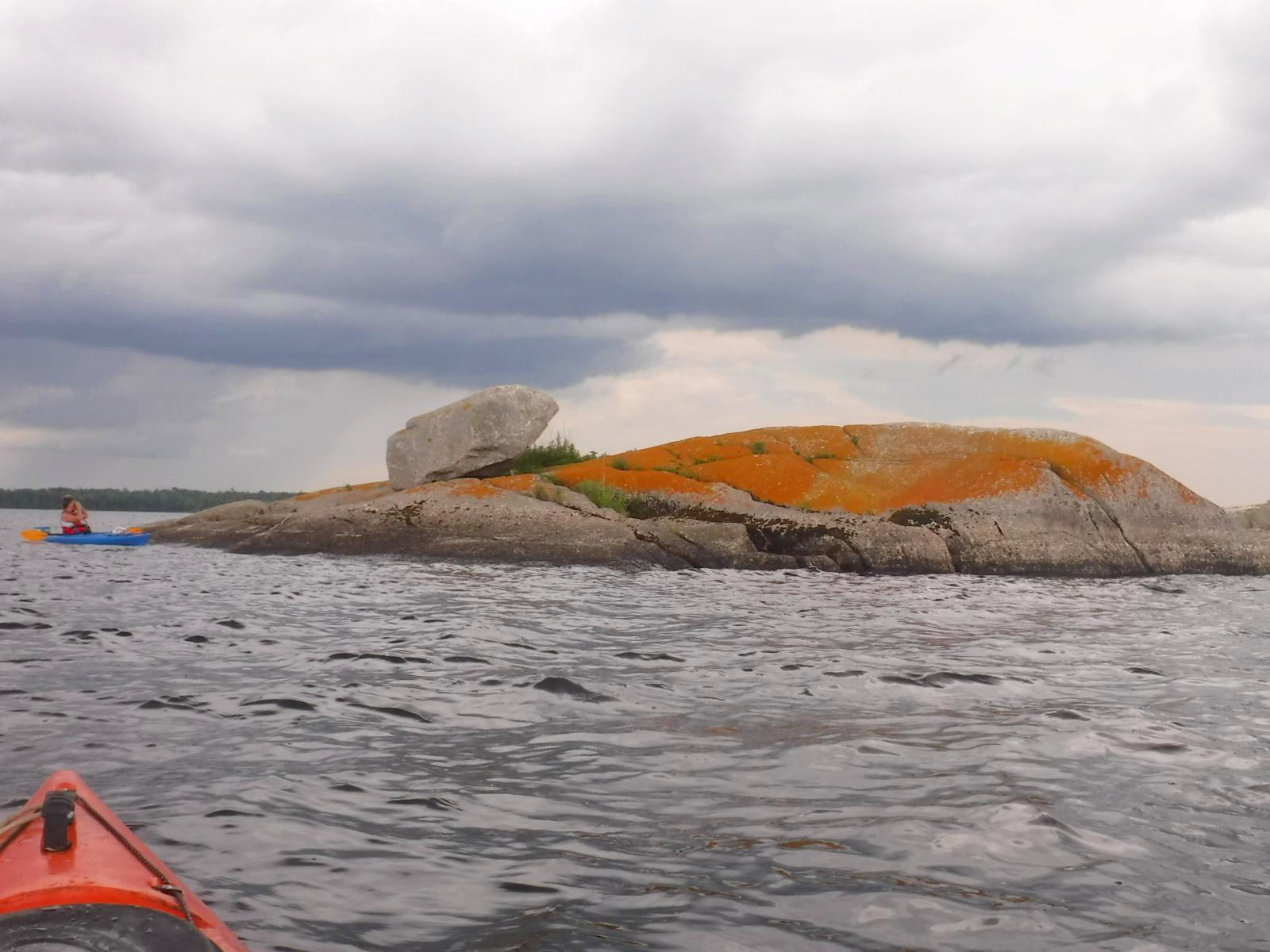
Orange Lichen (Xanthoria elegans) on rocky islet in Gaspereau Lake

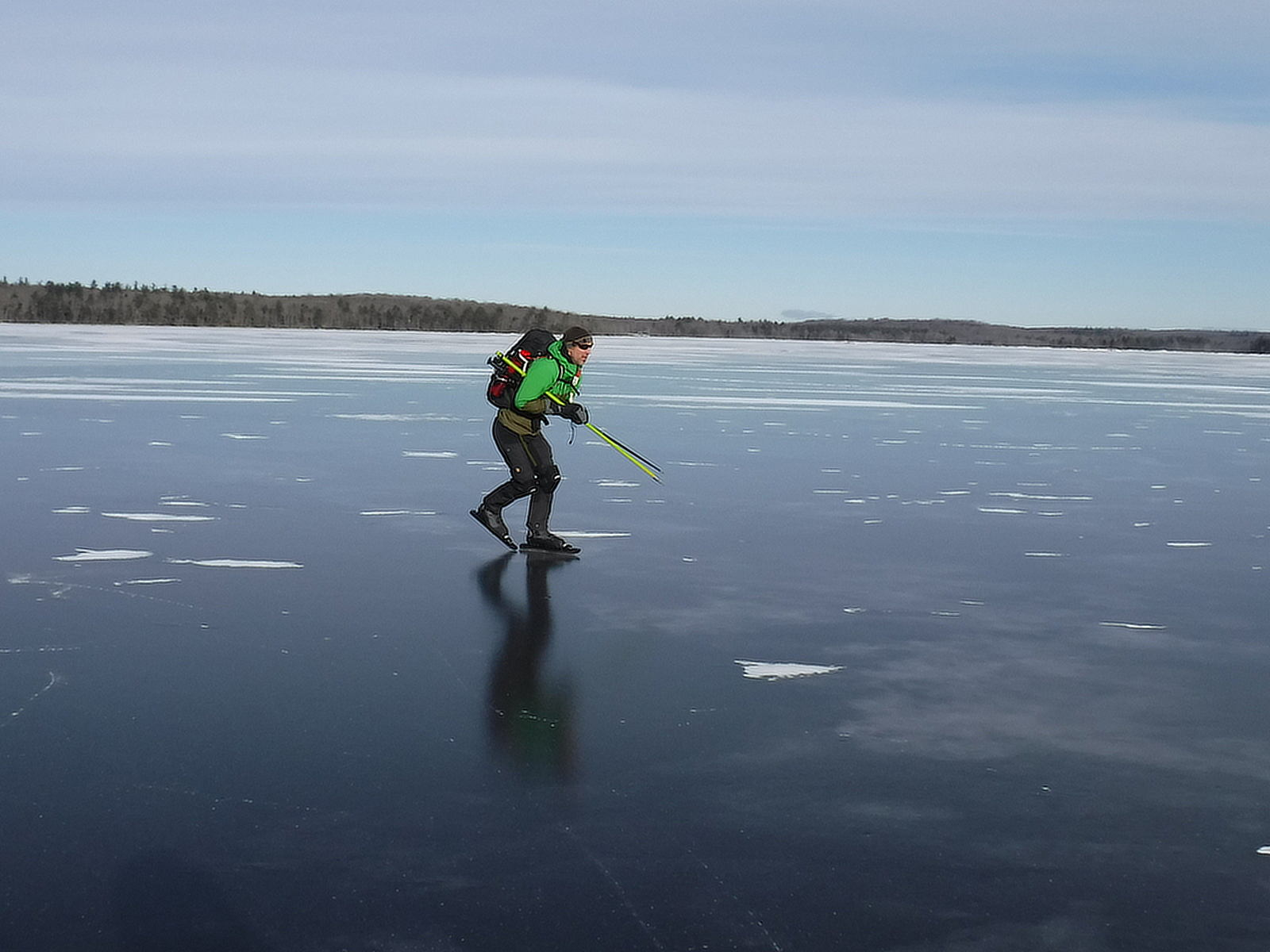
Nordic skating on Gaspereau Lake in winter
