= Just Us! =

Canadian importing company

Just Us! Coffee Roasters Co-op
- Type: Worker Co-op
- Founded: 1996
- Headquarters: Grand-Pré, Nova Scotia, Canada
- Website: justuscoffee.com

Just Us! Coffee Roasters Co-op is a Canadian importer of fair trade coffee, tea, sugar, and chocolate. Based in Grand Pré, Nova Scotia, Just Us! products are sold throughout Canada, typically in shops specializing in fair trade goods such as Ten Thousand Villages. Their motto is "People and the Planet before Profits". The company is a worker-owned cooperative.

The company was founded in 1996. The name was conceived as a pun on the word justice and references the fair trade movement.

The company roasts an annual volume of over 10,000 kilograms of coffee. In 2020, Just Us! produced C$7.8 million in sales.

== History ==
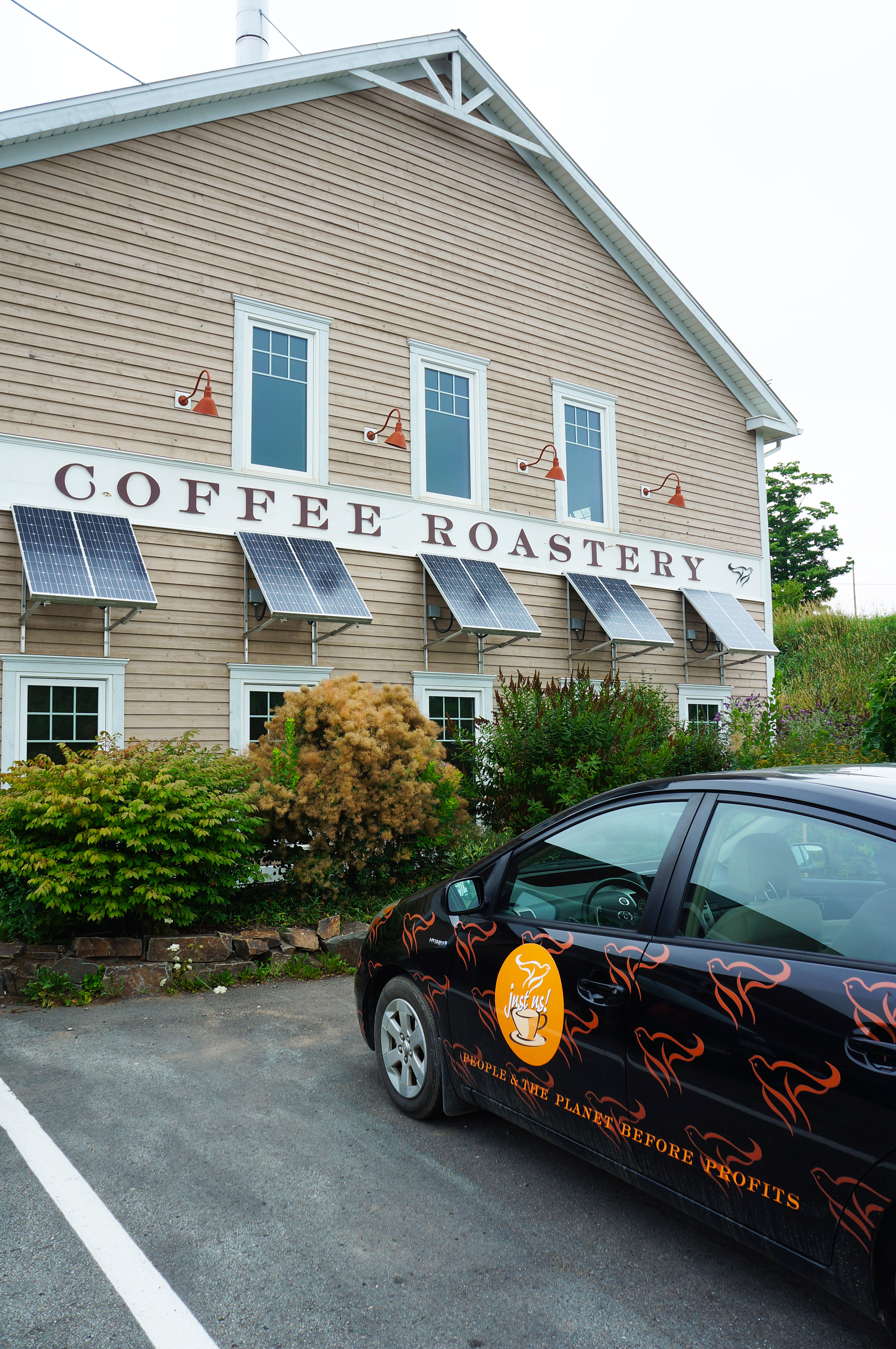
Grand Pre roastery and retail outlet

Debra and Jeff Moore, David and Jane Mangle, and Ria March started the business with several friends as a coffee roastery in New Minas in 1996. Just Us! was the first fair trade coffee roaster in Canada, starting a movement that lead to many other fair trade roasters in Canada. The business is a worker-owned cooperative.

In 2000, Just Us! relocated to a larger facility in Grand Pré, Nova Scotia. Fair trade remains the main focus of the business. Just Us! has extended its product line to include chocolate, teas, and sugar and expanded operations to include a fair trade chocolate factory in Grand Pré, Nova Scotia. Just Us! has two cafés in Wolfville, Nova Scotia, and Grand-Pré, Nova Scotia, and wholesales to many cafés, restaurants, and grocery stores across Atlantic Canada. They also sell their products on their online store.

Just Us! also has a partner program, through which it shares resources to assist other local businesses in areas such as creating a co-op or opening a café.

In 2017, during Canada's celebration of the 150th anniversary of its confederation, Just Us! put up a road sign and posted on social media stating, "Canada 150, Mi'kmaki 13000" to bring attention to the struggles of Indigenous peoples living in Canada.

== Co-operative ==
The company is a worker-owned cooperative. In order for a worker to become a member of the Just Us! cooperative, they must be employed at Just Us! for at least two years and invest $2000 into the business.

== Products ==
Just Us! sells a variety of products, including whole coffee beans, ground coffee, instant coffee, green coffee beans, syrups, coffee brewing equipment, tea, chocolate, and sugar.

== Certifications ==
Just Us! has obtained a number of certifications for their ethical and sustainability standards. They are the first member to have joined the Small Producers Program (SPP) in 2011. The SPP program is the only Fair Trade program in the world that is entirely owned by small producers. Just Us! is Fairtrade-certified by Fairtrade Canada, and listed on Fair World Project’s website as a mission-driven brand.

== Recognition ==
- Acadia University President's Entrepreneurial Award 2005
- Nova Scotia Human Rights Commission Human Rights Award 2005
