= Hortonville, Nova Scotia =

Community in Nova Scotia, Canada

Coordinates: 45°6′29.45″N 64°17′28.08″W

Hortonville in Nova Scotia

Hortonville is a community in the Canadian province of Nova Scotia, located in Kings County at the mouth of the Gaspereau River and is part of the Landscape of Grand Pré UNESCO World Heritage Site.

The site of Fort Vieux Logis is located by the river at Hortonville, built by the British during Father Le Loutre's War to control the nearby Acadian settlements at Grand Pre. The landing at Hortonville was used in 1755 to deport the majority of Acadians from Grand Pre during the Bay of Fundy Campaign of the Expulsion of the Acadians and is today marked by an Acadian Memorial Cross.

The same landing was used in 1760 when New England Planters, led by Robert Denison, arrived to re-settle the Grand Pre area and is marked by a National Historic Sites and Monuments Board plaque commemorating the Planters. The settlement was named Horton Township after Horton Hall, the English country estate of George Montagu-Dunk, 2nd Earl of Halifax, chairman of the British Board of Trade which was in charge of English settlements in Nova Scotia.

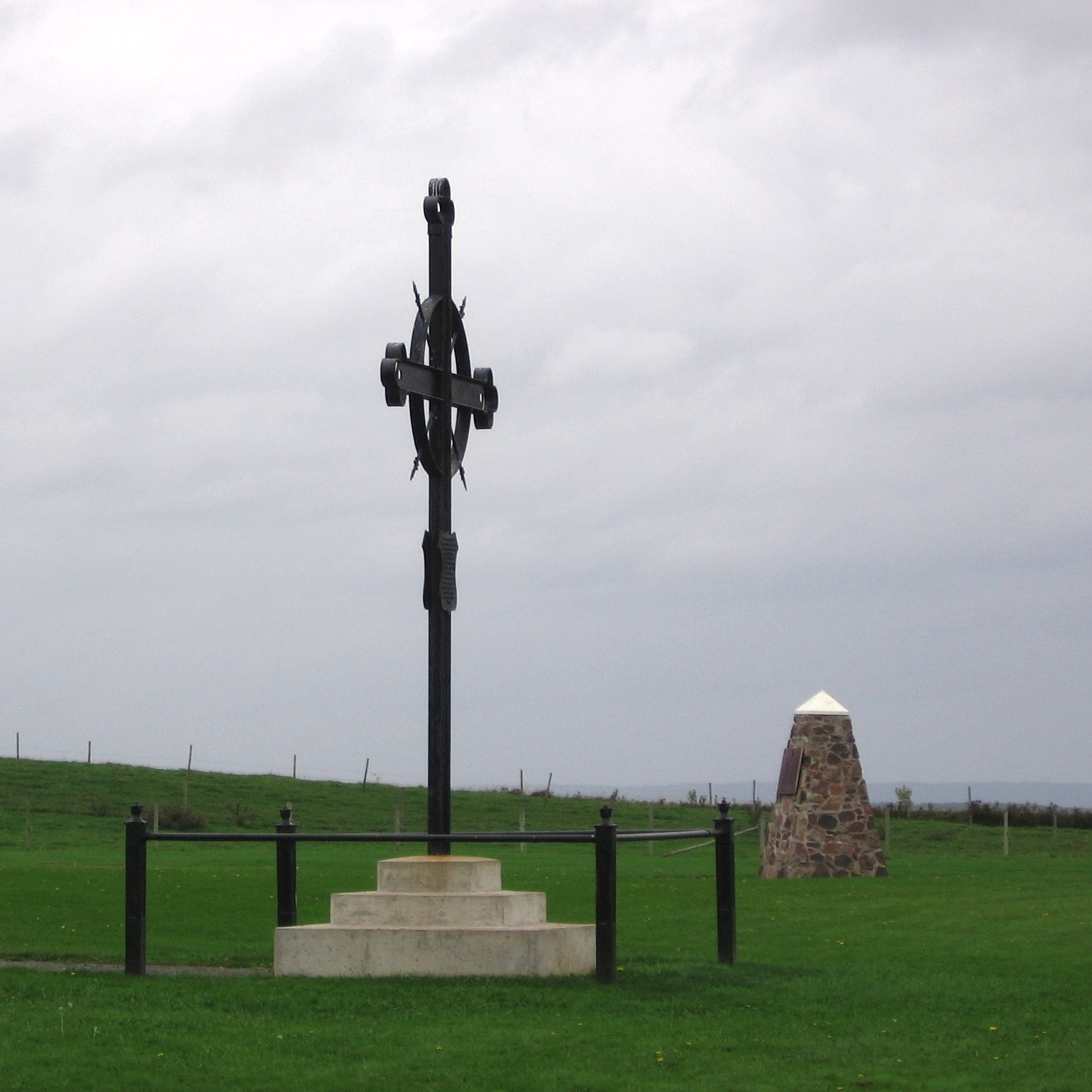
Acadian Memorial Cross, at Hortonville, marking the deportation site and showing the Planters landing monument in the background

First known as Horton Landing, Hortonville was surveyed as the intended townsite for the New England Planters Horton Township settlement. However, the town development gravitated instead to Wolfville further to the west and Hortonville remained as an agricultural area. The Windsor and Annapolis Railway, later the Dominion Atlantic Railway, built a bridge across the Gaspereau River at Hortonville in 1869 (re-built in 1911-1912), followed by a station which further developed agriculture and began tourism in the area. In 1924, the Dominion Atlantic Railway deeded a plot of land beside the tracks at Hortonville to the Acadian memorial society to erect an iron memorial cross at what was believed to be the site of the deportation. In 2005 the railway assisted moving the cross to a site owned by Parks Canada closer to the river established by more recent research as the actual deportation site.
