= Windsor and Annapolis Railway =

1869–1894 Canadian railway

Overview
- Headquarters: Corporate: London, England; Operational: Kentville, Nova Scotia
- Reporting mark: W&AR
- Locale: Nova Scotia, Canada
- Dates of operation: 1869–1894
- Successor: Dominion Atlantic Railway 1894-1993

Technical
- Track gauge: 4 ft 8 1/2 in (1,435 mm) standard gauge
- Previous gauge: built to 5 ft 6 in (1,676 mm) broad gauge but converted in 1875
- Length: 118 miles (190 km)

The Windsor and Annapolis Railway (W&AR) was a historic Canadian railway that operated in Nova Scotia's Annapolis Valley.

The railway ran from Windsor to Annapolis Royal and leased connections to Nova Scotia's capital of Halifax. The W&AR played a major role in developing Nova Scotia's agriculture and tourism industries, operating from 1869 until 1894 when it evolved into the larger Dominion Atlantic Railway.

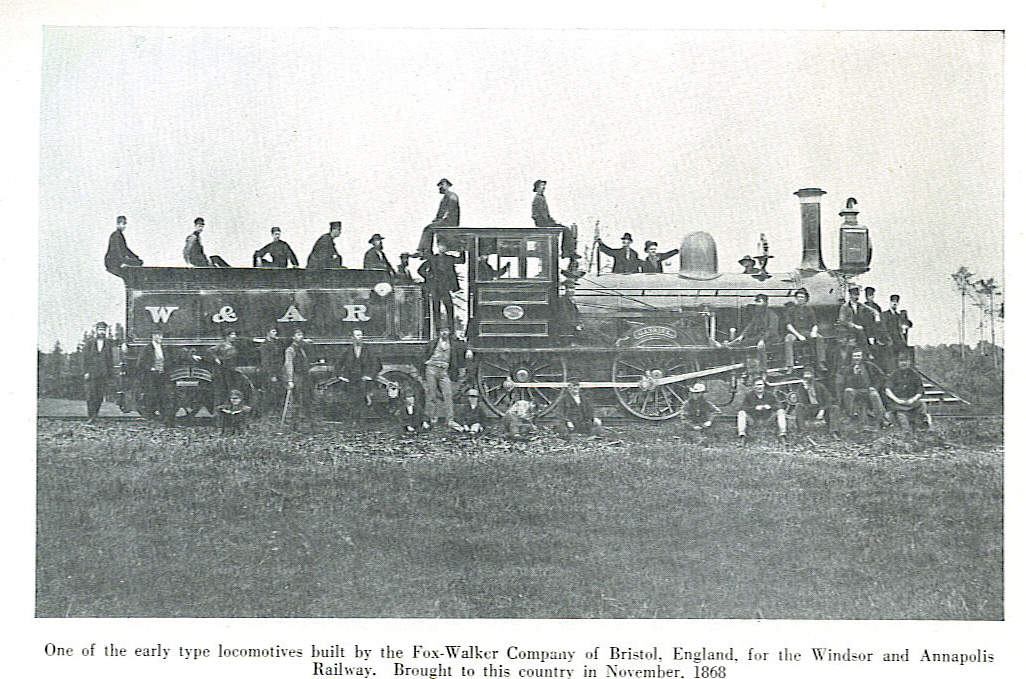
The locomotive Gabriel in Kentville, Nova Scotia; one of the W&AR's Fox, Walker and Company broad gauge locomotives

The W&AR was formed by British railway investors and Nova Scotian railway promoters in 1864. Investors were attracted by the traffic potential to link Halifax with Bay of Fundy and New England ports as well as the apple orchards in the Annapolis Valley. The company's operations centre was in Kentville, although corporate headquarters remained in London, United Kingdom. The Windsor and Annapolis negotiated running rights over the government-owned "Windsor Branch" of the Nova Scotia Railway to connect Windsor to the city and harbour of Halifax. Vernon Smith, an experienced railway manager and engineer from Britain was the engineer in charge of construction and became the first general manager. The resident engineer was Henry Ernest Milner, also from England. Construction began in 1866 with locomotives landed for work crews at Windsor, Wolfville, Nova Scotia and Kentville. The line began operation between Kentville and Annapolis Royal on June 26, 1869 while work continued on the line's two large bridges east of Kentville over the large estuaries of the Avon River at Windsor and the Gaspereau River at Hortonville. An official opening was celebrated on August 18, 1869 with dignitaries including Lord Lisgar the Governor General of Canada arriving by rail from Halifax, although shuttled over the uncompleted bridge works by stage coach. The devastating Saxby Gale on October 5, 1869 destroyed much of the newly built line between Hortonville and Wolfville which required hasty rebuilding. Despite these challenges, the railway opened for full operation on December 18, 1869 when the Avon and Gaspereau Bridges were complete and first train ran across the entire line from Halifax to Annapolis Royal.

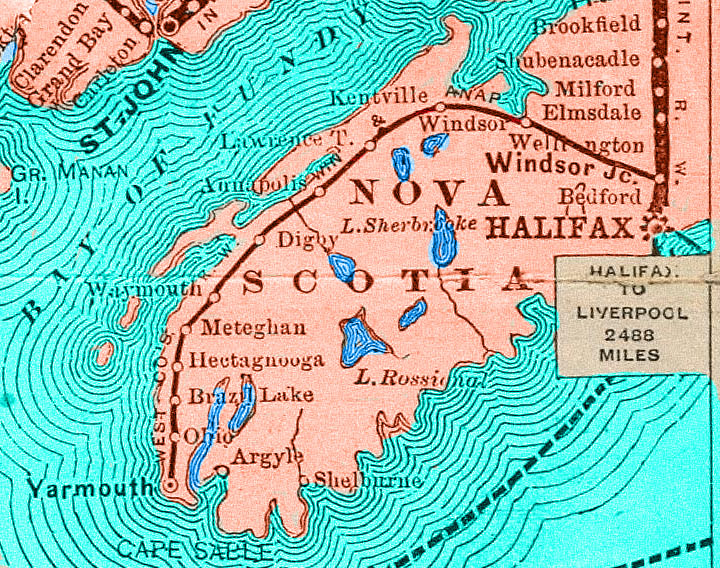
Map of the Windsor & Annapolis and the Western Counties railways in 1885

The railway struggled at first with inexperienced staff, limited equipment and especially with extensive and ongoing repairs required on the sections of the line along the Minas Basin damaged by the Saxby Gale in 1869. However passenger traffic quickly blossomed, helped by early tourism promotion of steamship connections to the emerging New England tourism market. Freight traffic began more slowly but an explosion in apple shipments in the early 1880s ensured the prosperity of the line.

The railway was built at first to the Canadian broad gauge of 5 ft 6 in (1,676 mm). It converted to the standard gauge of 4 ft 8 1/2 in (1,435 mm) in 1875. The W&AR bought out the thriving branch line, the Cornwallis Valley Railway in 1890 which ran from Kentville to Kingsport through rich apple districts.

== Merger and renaming ==
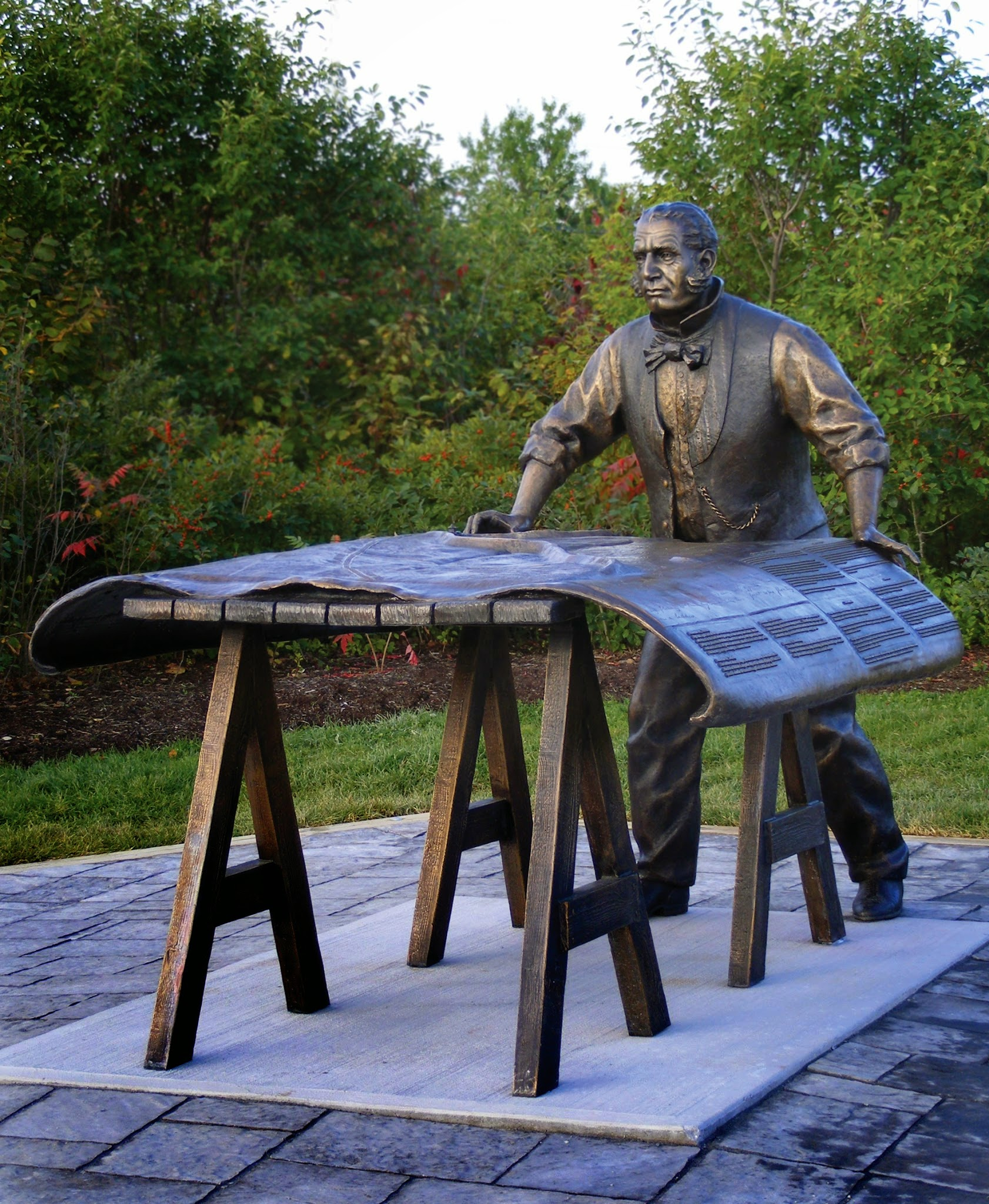
"Work at the Trestle" sculpture by Ruth Abernethy in Wolfville, Nova Scotia showing the Vernon Smith planning the W&AR.

A formidable rival to the W&AR was the Western Counties Railway (WCR), based in Yarmouth, Nova Scotia, which used political allies to threaten the exclusive W&AR access to the critical "Windsor Branch" connection into Halifax. However, the W&AR was able to buy out the WCR in 1894 to create the Dominion Atlantic Railway, thus providing a through line from Halifax to Yarmouth. The W&AR set the direction for the new united company which took over the W&AR headquarters in Kentville as well as the W&AR's "Land of Evangeline" identity.

The Windsor and Hantsport Railway continued to operate over portions of the old Windsor and Annapolis mainline until 2011.

A monument to the Vernon Smith and his work constructing of the Windsor and Annapolis Railway was installed beside the line at the waterfront park in Wolfville in 2013.
