= Gaspereau River (Nova Scotia) =

Coordinates: 45°07′37″N 64°16′21″W

- Tubing on the Gaspereau River

Location
- Country: Canada
- Province: Nova Scotia

Physical characteristics
- Source
  - location: Gaspereau Lake
- Mouth
  - location: Minas Basin
  - elevation: sea level
- Length: 24.5 km (15.2 mi)
- Basin size: 1,375 km (854 mi)

The Gaspereau River is a river in Kings County, Nova Scotia, Canada.

It has a length of approximately 24 km from its source at Gaspereau Lake on the South Mountain south of Kentville to its mouth at Hortonville on the Minas Basin. The lower portion of the river is tidal for 6.5 km until Melanson and there are extensive tidal marshes in the lower reaches. The upper 16 km runs swiftly over gravel beds, boulders and bedrock, except for several dammed sections which form narrow and deep channels. Damming for Hydroelectric generation has resulted in twelve major lakes being connected to the river creating a watershed of 1,375 square kilometres. A major tributary is the Black River which joins the Gaspeareau at White Rock. The Black River once flowed further north into the Cornwallis River but connected to the Gaspereau through a natural erosion process known as river capture.

== Fishery ==
Although the Gaspereau is a short river, the riverbed habitat and connecting lakes form an important and productive breeding ground for several species of migratory fish including Gaspereau (Alewife), Rainbow Smelt and Atlantic Salmon. Atlantic Tomcod, Atlantic Sturgeon and Striped Bass spawn in the tidal portion of the river.

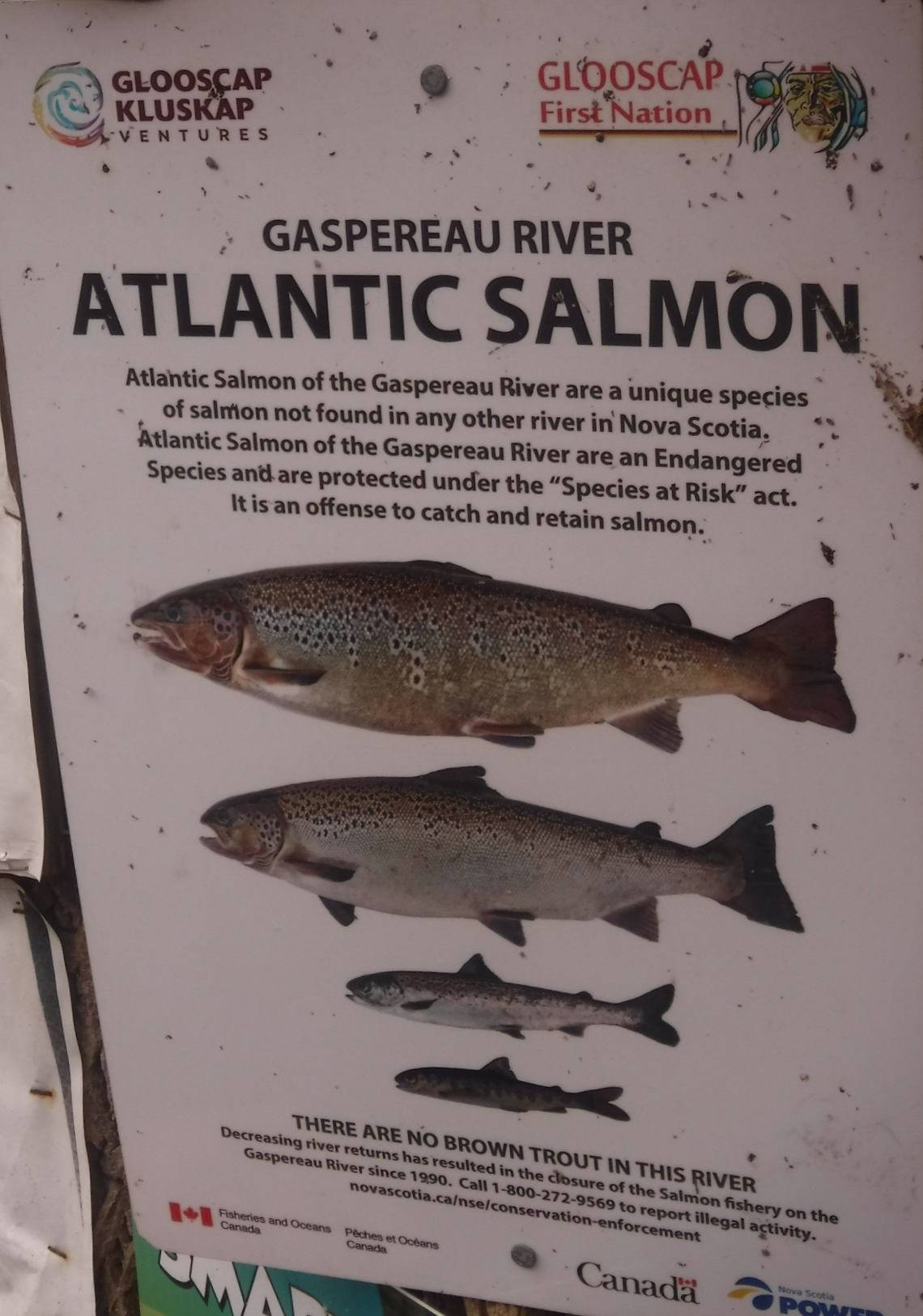
Gaspereau River salmon is an endangered species

== History and economy ==
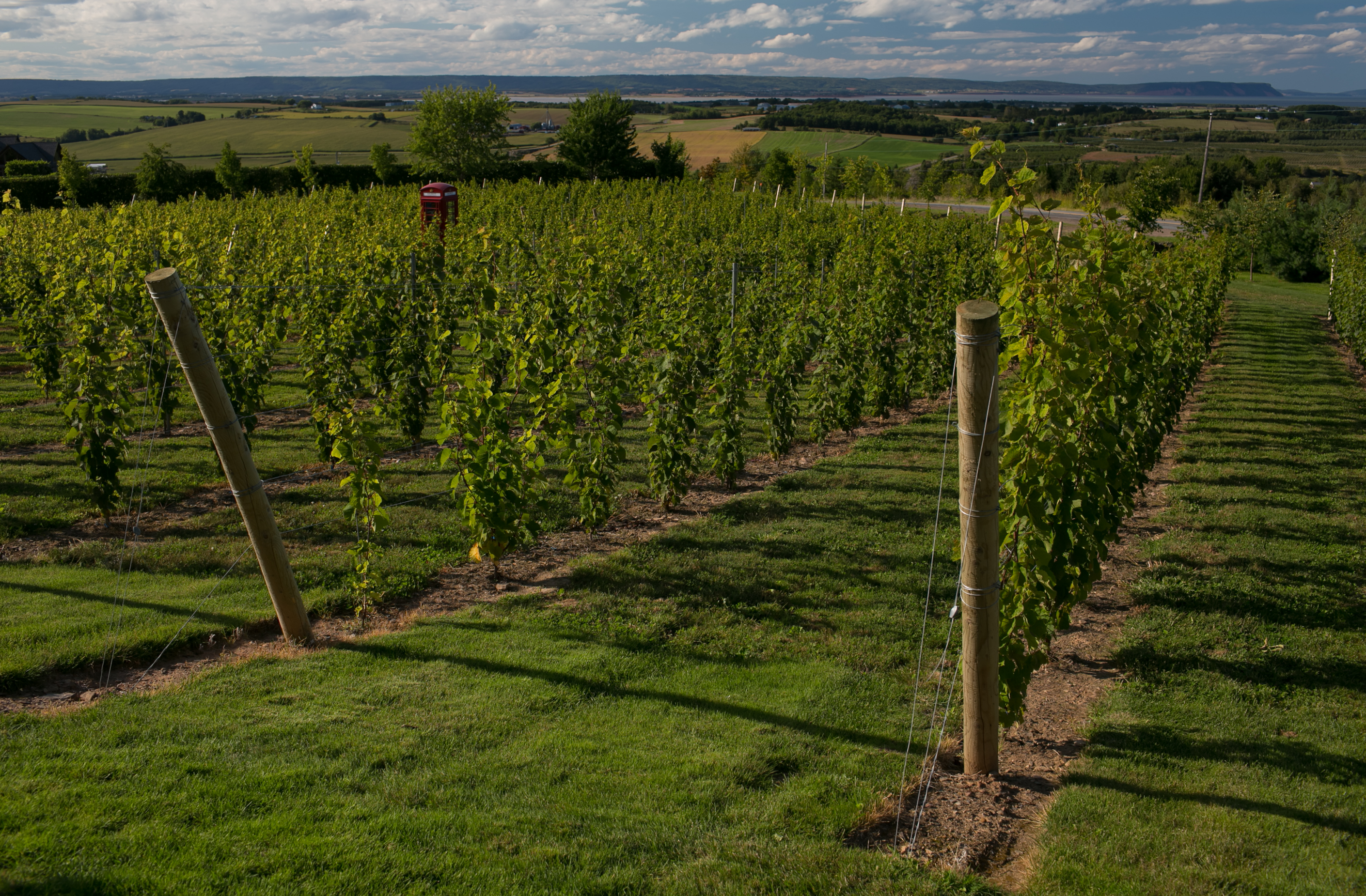
Modern vineyard in the Gaspereau River Valley

The productive fish runs of the Gaspereau attracted a large settlement of the Mi'kmaq people near Melanson.

Acadians from the settlements at Grand-Pre were also attracted to the fish runs of the river in the late 1600s and named it after the Gaspereau fish with the name "Rivière des Gasparots" first appearing in a 1701 census of Acadia. The New England Planters who settled the area after the Expulsion of the Acadians also harvested fish but also cleared the river banks for farming, notably for apple orchards and built saw mills in the upper reaches of the river. Eventually nine sawmills operated on the river system, creating employment through extensive logging of the South Mountain but also disrupting the ecology of the river with dams and sawdust deposits. After an unsuccessful attempt in 1910, a hydroelectric dam was completed a Stivers Falls near White Rock in 1920. It was the first of a series of hydroelectric dams which replaced the remaining water sawmills with a network of hydroelectric dams. Eventually eight dams and five hydroelectric stations were built along the Gaspereau River, diverting some lakes into the Gaspereau which once flowed into the Avon River. Fish ladders were built to allow some fish migration to continue. A longtime tradition of recreational tubing on the Gaspereau, floating down the river on inner tubes, has grown in popularity in recent years to the point of causing traffic and parking concerns.

Vineyards occupy a significant part of the Gaspereau Valley, up to Grand-Pré, producing white wines, such as based on the L'Acadie blanc grape variety, and red wines (for example, the Marechal Foch variety.

== Communities ==
- Gaspereau (Wallbrook, Melanson, and White Rock)
- Hortonville
- Avonport

== See also ==
- List of rivers of Nova Scotia
