= Partridge Island (Saint John County) =

Provincial park of New Brunswick, Canada

Coordinates: 45°14′18″N 66°3′14″W

Partridge Island National Historic Site of Canada
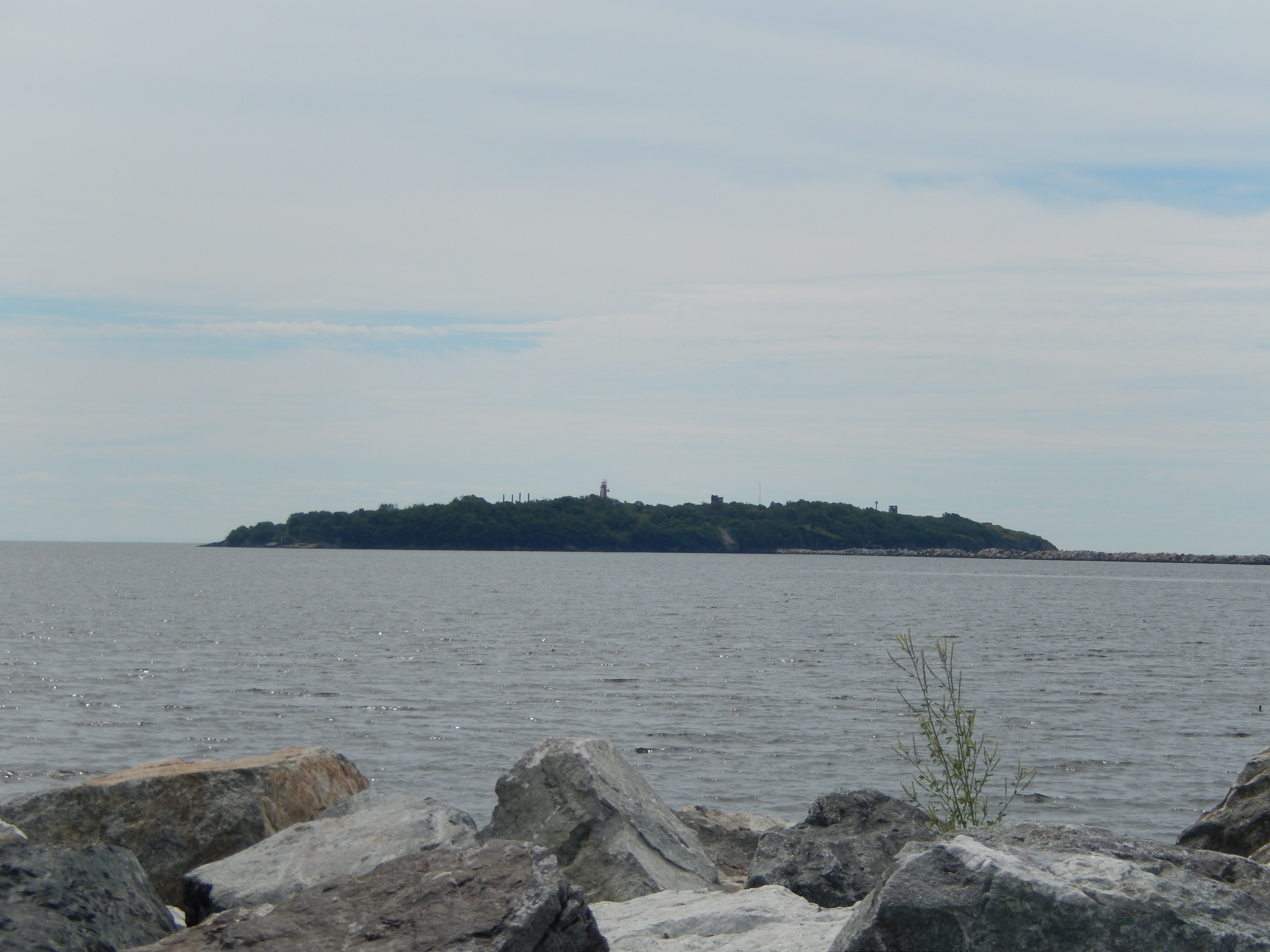
- Partridge Island from Saint John
- Interactive map of Partridge Island National Historic Site of Canada
- Location: Saint John
- Established: 1785
- Governing body: Government of Canada

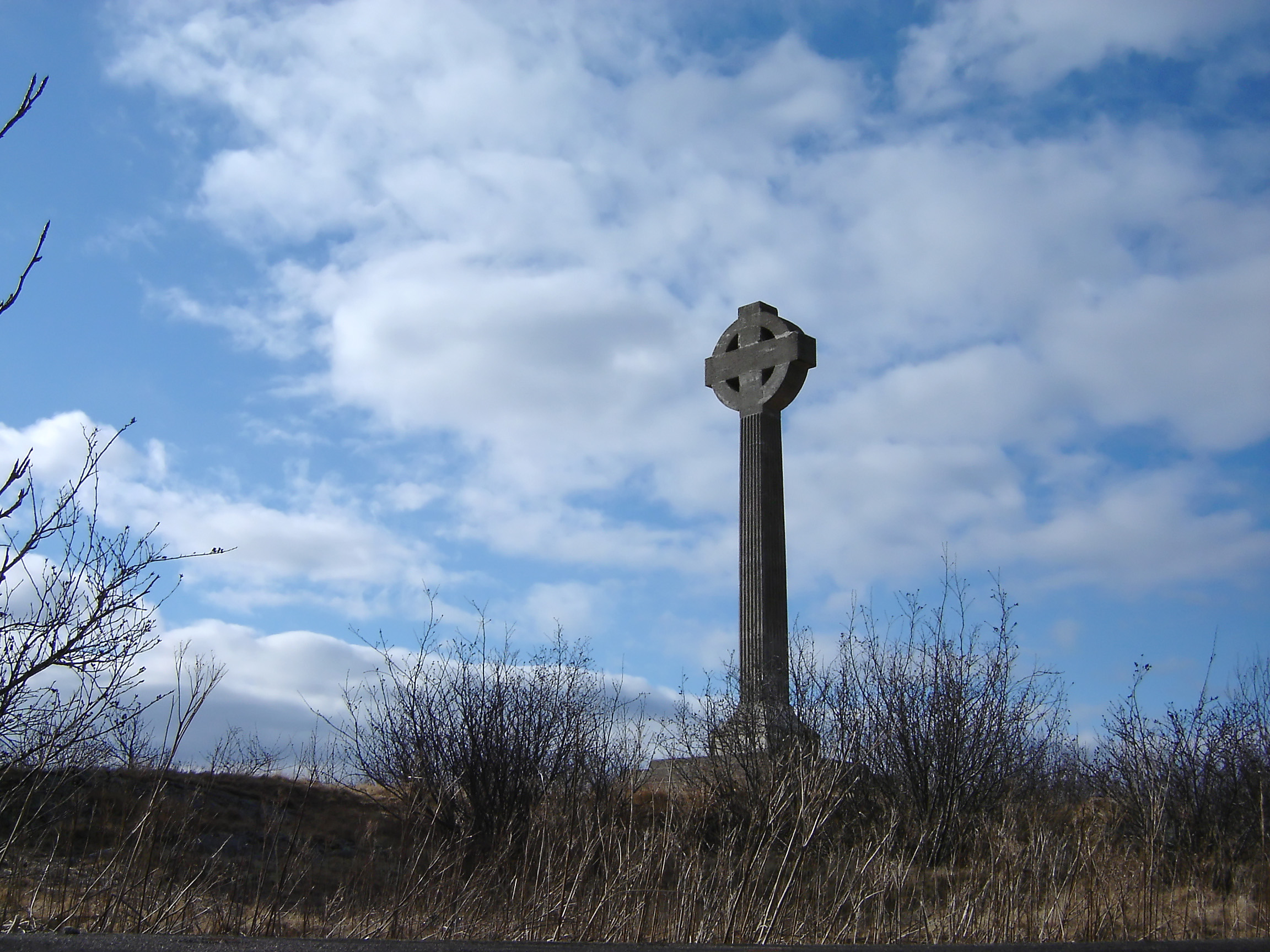
The Celtic Cross Memorial on Partridge Island.

Partridge Island or Partridge Island Quarantine Station National Historic Site of Canada is a Canadian island located in the Bay of Fundy off the coast of Saint John, New Brunswick, within the city's Inner Harbour. Although it was the first quarantine station to be established in North America, it is often referred to as Canada's equivalent to Ellis Island.

The island is a provincial historic site and was designated a National Historic Site in 1974. It lies on the west side of the mouth of the Saint John River.

During the American Revolution, in 1780, six British troops from Major Timothy Hierlihy's corps, under the command of Lieut. Wheaton, attacked eight American privateers in a house they were occupying on Partridge island. The British killed three of the privateers and the other five were taken prisoner.

Partridge Island was first established as a quarantine station and pest house in 1785 by the Saint John Royal Charter, which also set aside the island for use as a navigational aid station and a military post. Its first use as a quarantine station was not until 1816. A hospital was constructed on the island in 1830.

== Immigration and memorials ==
The island received its largest influx of immigrants during the 1840s "Great Famine" in Ireland, when 30,000 immigrants were processed by the island's visiting and resident physicians, with 1,196 dying at Partridge Island and the adjacent city of Saint John during the Typhus epidemic of 1847. During the 1890s there were over 78,000 immigrants a year being examined or treated on the island.

A memorial to the Irish immigrants of the mid-1840s was set up on the island in the 1890s, but by World War One it had deteriorated. In 1926 the Saint John City Cornet Band approached Saint John contractor George McArthur who agreed to lead a campaign to build a suitable monument. The Celtic Cross memorial to the Irish dead of 1847 was dedicated in 1927. This was restored and rededicated in 1985. In the early and mid-1980s, memorials were built by the Saint John Jewish Community, the Loyal Orange Lodge, the Partridge Island Research Project, and the Partridge Island & Harbour Heritage Inc., a company that was registered in 1988 and dissolved in 2004. The memorials were dedicated to the Protestant, Catholic and Jewish immigrants buried in the six island graveyards. A monument was also dedicated to all of the Irish dead from 1830 to the 1920s.

=== James Patrick Collins ===
James Patrick Collins, born c.1824 in County Cork, Ireland, was the eldest of four children of Patrick Collins and Isabella Hughes. He immigrated to Saint John with his family in 1837. Apprenticed to Dr. George R. Peters, superintendent of the Lunatic Asylum, Collins was encouraged to study medicine, which he pursued in Paris (c.1844) and later London. He returned to Saint John in 1846, beginning practice from his family’s home on Mill Street.

In May 1847, a typhus epidemic arrived with Irish immigrants fleeing the potato famine. By June, the Partridge Island quarantine station was overwhelmed with nearly 2,500 patients. Dr. George J. Harding, unable to manage alone, enlisted help. Despite the danger, Dr. Collins and Dr. William S. Harding volunteered, earning £50 monthly.

By late June, both doctors contracted typhus. Collins died on 2 July 1847 less than a month after beginning his service. His remains were sealed in a lead coffin and transported to the Roman Catholic cemetery in Saint John's North End. His funeral drew nearly 4,000 mourners—reputedly the largest in Saint John's history. His body was later moved to St. Peter’s cemetery near Fort Howe, and in 1949 reinterred in a common grave in St. Joseph’s cemetery.

== History ==
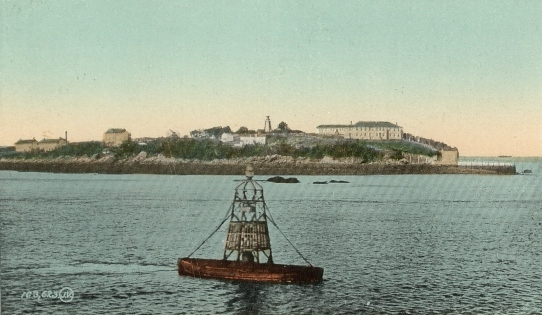
A c. 1905 postcard showing Partridge Island and a buoy. The large hospital building on the right was new at the time.

The island's folklore begins with the Mi'kmaq Nation, who referred to the island as "Quak'm'kagan'ik" meaning "a piece cut out." This name is in reference to the belief that the island was created when Glooscap smashed the dam that "Big Beaver" had built. At the Reversing Falls Rapids a piece of the dam was swept in the rush of water to the mouth of the harbour where it came to rest to form the island. This version of the legend dates to the early 20th century. The 19th century version refers to Partridge Island in Minas Basin in Nova Scotia.

Following the arrival of the American Loyalists from the American Revolutionary War in 1783, and the formation of the city of Saint John, there was the need for a lighthouse to aid shipping. A light station was erected on Partridge Island and began operating in 1791. It was only the third light station to have been built in British North America. A signal station was soon located on the island and it was used for many years to alert the harbour to vessels approaching from the Bay of Fundy. The island's light and signal station were both established in 1791.

The island was Saint John's principal military fortification from 1800 until 1947. It was the only Saint John fortification to be used during all periods of Saint John's military activity. There are still visible remains of the Royal Artillery gun battery of 1812, and of both the First and Second World Wars.

The island was also home to dozens of island families over the years, from lightkeepers such as Captain Samuel Duffy, James Wilson, Albert Smith, Charles Mitchell and Thomas Furness, to hospital staff such as Doctors George and William Harding, hospital stewards Thomas McGowan, Fred and Jim Hargrove, and teachers for the island's school such as Jean MacCullum and Forbes Elliott.

Boat tours to the island operated from 1982 until 1995 when the island's small museum closed. Public access is now restricted. There have been numerous books written about the island as well as video documentaries.

== Efforts to reopen the island ==
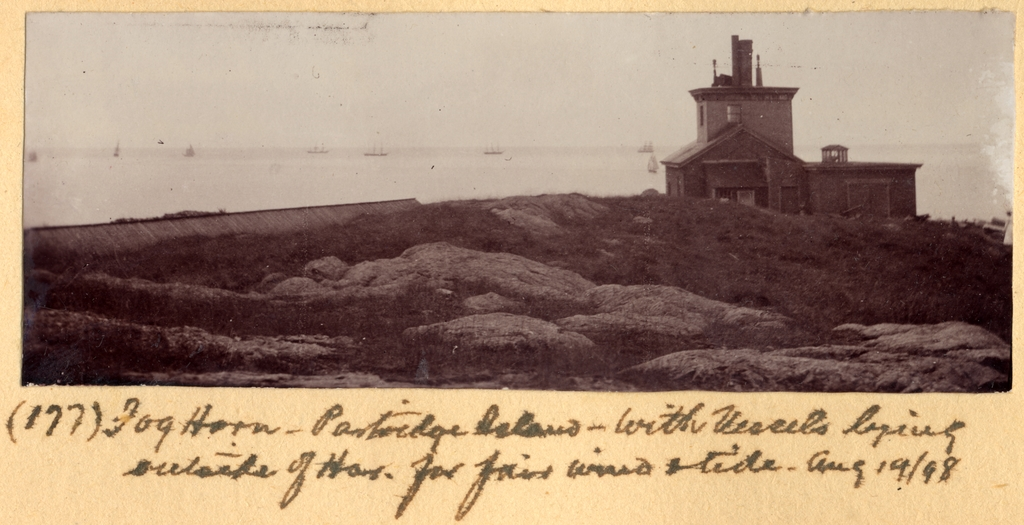
Foghorn on Partridge Island

Ambitions to turn Partridge Island into a tourist site have been ongoing. In 2014, the federal government set aside $200,000 for a feasibility study which would assess the cost of repairing the breakwater and creating a walkway that would cross to the island. The study found that it would cost between $27-$40 million to create a path to the island. In 2016 Saint John member of Parliament Wayne Long proposed a wharf be built for boat tours.

Before opening to the public, a clean-up of the island's significant soil contaminants would have to be done. All of the remaining buildings on the site have been vandalized or burned. Of the six graveyards, the 19th-century graveyard was almost obliterated by the military during World War II. Less than three dozen graves remain.

== See also ==
- List of communities in New Brunswick
- List of islands of New Brunswick
