= Persons of National Historic Significance =

Designation given to historic Canadian people

Persons of National Historic Significance (National Historic People) (French: Personnes d'importance historique nationale (personnages historiques nationaux)) are people designated by the Canadian government as being nationally significant in the history of the country. Designations are made by the Minister of the Environment on the recommendation of the Historic Sites and Monuments Board of Canada. Approximately 70 nominations are submitted to the board each year. A person is eligible to be listed 25 years after death, but Prime Ministers may be designated any time after death. Parks Canada administers the program, and installs and maintains the federal plaques commonly erected to commemorate each person, usually placed at a site closely associated with them. The intent is generally to honour the person's contribution to the country but is always to educate the public about that person.

Canada has related programs for the designation of National Historic Sites and National Historic Events. Events, Sites, and Persons are each typically marked by a federal plaque, but the markers do not indicate which designation a subject has been given. The Welland Canal is an Event, while the Rideau Canal is a Site. The cairn and plaque to John McDonell (Aberchalder) does not refer to a National Historic Person, but is erected because his home, Glengarry House, is a National Historic Site. Similarly, the plaque to John Guy officially marks not a Person, but an Event—the Landing of John Guy.

== List of Persons of National Historic Significance ==
As of September 2025 this list contains 748 entries. The searchable database provided by Parks Canada returns 746 records, and may not be up to date.

Name	Role	Year designated
Maude Abbott	Medical researcher	1993
John Abbott	Prime Minister	1938
William Aberhart	Premier (Alberta), Social Credit leader	1974
Gabriel Acquin	Hunter, cultural broker, Maliseet guide	1999
Frank Dawson Adams	Geologist	1943
Mary Electa Adams	Women's education reformer	2004
Thomas Adams	Town planner	2019
William Maxwell Aitken, 1st Baron Beaverbrook	Businessman, press baron, philanthropist	2016
Thomas Beamish Akins	Historian	1938
Emma Albani	Musician (opera soprano)	1937
William Donald Albright	Journalist, agriculturalist, promoted development of Peace River district	1954
Grant Allen	Author	1938
Susan Louisa Moir Allison	Author, historian (First Nations)	2007
Walter Seymour Allward	Sculptor	2002
Adams George Archibald	Father of Confederation, Lieutenant-Governor (Manitoba, Northwest Territories, Nova Scotia)	1938
Edith Archibald	Women's rights	1997
Edward William Archibald	Surgeon	1998
Samuel George William Archibald	Attorney General (Nova Scotia), Chief Justice (Prince Edward Island)	1939
Joseph E. Atkinson	Publisher, philanthropist	1986
Philippe-Joseph Aubert de Gaspé	Author	1974
Charles Aubert de La Chesnaye	Businessman	1971
George Back	Artist, Arctic explorer	1973
William Baffin	Arctic explorer	1972
Charles Bagot	Governor General (British North America), role in responsible government	1926
Frederick Walker Baldwin	Engineer	1957
Robert Baldwin	Co-premier (Province of Canada), reformer, role in responsible government	1937
Frederick Banting	Medical researcher (insulin), shared Nobel Prize	1945
Marius Barbeau	Ethnographer, folklorist	1985
William George Barker	Military, World War I pilot	1998
Robert Bartlett	Arctic explorer	1969
Arthur Beauchesne	Parliamentary expert	2003
François Beaulieu	Métis leader	2000
Adam Beck	Politician, founded Ontario Hydro	1938
William George Beers	Dentist, developed modern sport of lacrosse	1976
Matthew Baillie Begbie	Judge, Chief Justice (British Columbia)	1959
Edward Belcher	Naval officer, surveyor	1938
Georges-Antoine Belcourt	Missionary, banker	1959
Mabel Hubbard Bell	Aeronautical investor, founder of educational & social organizations	2018
Robert Bell	Geologist (Chief Geologist of Canada), explorer	1938
John Wilson Bengough	Cartoonist, journalist, poet, lecturer	1938
Charles Fox Bennett	Businessman, politician	1975
R. B. Bennett	Prime Minister	1949
William Berczy	Pioneer, painter	2016
Joseph-Elzéar Bernier	Mariner (promoted Canadian sovereignty in the Arctic Archipelago)	1961
Norman Bethune	Physician, political activist	1972
William Beynon (Gusgai'in)	First Nations chief, ethnographer	1989
Michel Bibaud	Poet, historian	1944
Mary and Henry Bibb	Author, abolitionist, publisher (African Canadian community)	2002
Big Bear (Misto-ha-a-Musqua)	First Nations leader (Plains Cree), role in North-West Rebellion	1971
Billy Bishop	World War I pilot, Victoria Cross recipient	1980
Davidson Black	Physician, paleontologist (Peking Man)	1974
Martha Black	Politician (second woman Member of Parliament)	1987
Thornton and Lucie Blackburn	Escaped slaves, founded Toronto's first taxi operation	1999
Edward Blake	Premier (Ontario)	1937
Samuel Hume Blake	Politician	2025
Richard Blanshard	Governor (Vancouver Island)	1951
Jean Blewett	Journalist, poet	1946
La Bolduc (Mary Travers)	Musician	1992
Joseph-Armand Bombardier	Businessman, inventor (snowmobile)	1994
Robert Bond	Prime Minister (Newfoundland, pre-Confederation)	1975
Robert Borden	Prime Minister	1938
Paul-Émile Borduas	Artist	2024
Jim Boss	Assisted First Nations in the Yukon	2001
Pierre Boucher	Author, government official, First Nations interpreter	1978
Joseph Bouchette	Author, cartographer, Surveyor General of Lower Canada	1937
Sieurs de La Boularderie (Louis-Simon le Poupet de la Boularderie, his son Antoine)	Settlers (Cape Breton)	1964
Henri Bourassa	Politician, publisher (Le Devoir)	1962
Marguerite Bourgeoys	Nun, founded first Canadian religious community (Congregation of Notre Dame)	1985
John George Bourinot	House of Commons clerk, founded Royal Society of Canada	1938
Mackenzie Bowell	Prime Minister	1945
Joseph W. Boyle	Businessman (mining)	1984
Joseph Brant (Thayendanega)	First Nations leader (Mohawk), British ally, settler, slave trader	1972
Mary Brant (Tekonwatonti)	First Nations leader (Six Nations)	1994
John Gough Brick	Missionary, settler	1954
Emmanuel Briffa	Theatre decorator	2007
Isaac Brock	Soldier	2010
Allan Brooks	Artist (wildlife)	1999
Harriet Brooks	Nuclear physicist	2005
Joseph Broussard	Acadian leader and defender	2023
George Brown	Father of Confederation, publisher (Globe), abolitionist (Underground Railroad)	1950
George Browne	Architect	2008
James Bruce, 8th Earl of Elgin	Governor General (British North America, pre-Confederation), role in responsible government	1953
Étienne Brûlé	Explorer, Coureur de bois, lived among First Nations	1984
George Bryce	Educator (Manitoba College), historian	1947
Peter Bryce	Physician	2024
Douglas Brymner	Archivist, founded Public Archives of Canada	1938
John Buchan	Governor-General	2010
Patrick Burns	Rancher, businessman, Senator	1960
Thomas Button	Arctic explorer	1972
John By	Engineer (Rideau Canal)	1954
George Frederick Cameron	Journalist, poet	1946
Lydia Campbell	Author	2009
Alexander Campbell	Father of Confederation	1939
William Wilfred Campbell	Writer	1938
Charles Camsell	Geologist, Commissioner (Northwest Territories)	2001
William Canniff	Physician, historian, teacher	1945
Guy Carleton, 1st Baron Dorchester	Governor (Quebec, pre-Confederation), Governor-in-Chief (British North America)	1974
John Carling	Brewer, politician, founded Dominion Experimental Farms	1938
Bliss Carman	Poet	1945
Emily Carr	Author, painter	1950
Father Henry Carr	College leader, Univ. of Toronto president	2012
William Carson	Businessman, physician, reformer	1954
Frederick Carter	Father of Confederation, Prime Minister (Newfoundland, pre-Confederation)	1959
George-Étienne Cartier	Father of Confederation, French-Canadian statesman	1937
Jacques Cartier	Early French explorer paved way for settlement	2011
Richard John Cartwright	Politician	1938
Joseph Casavant	Manufacturer (pipe organs)	1974
Thérèse Casgrain	Suffragist, politician	2022
Ethel Catherwood	Athlete	2023
René-Robert Cavelier, Sieur de La Salle	Explorer, founded Lachine, rebuilt Fort Frontenac	1934
Claude Champagne	Musician (composer)	1988
Samuel de Champlain	Explorer, founded Quebec City, "The Father of New France"	1929
Edward Barron Chandler	Father of Confederation, Lieutenant-Governor (New Brunswick)	1939
Jean-Charles Chapais	Father of Confederation, Senator	1943
Thomas Chapais	Historian, Senator	1955
Joseph-Adolphe Chapleau	Premier (Quebec), politician	1974
Margaret Ridley Charlton	Medical librarian, co-founder Medical Library Association	2003
William Henry Chase	Businessman, philanthropist	1939
Gaspard-Joseph Chaussegros de Léry	Seigneur, military leader, politician	2006
Paul Chomedey de Maisonneuve	Military officer, founded Montreal	1985
Robert Christie	Historian, politician	1938
Francis Clergue	Businessman (Sault Ste. Marie industry)	1987
Lucille Clifton ('Wii Nii Puun) (1876–1962)	Clan leader, cultural defender	2016
John Clinch	Clergyman, physician (vaccination)	1964
William Coaker	Union leader, politician	1985
James Cockburn	Father of Confederation, first House of Commons Speaker	1939
Kathleen Blake Coleman	Innovative newspaper editor	2011
George Coles	Father of Confederation	1939
Enos Collins	Businessman (Halifax)	1974
Lionel Conacher	Athlete (Grey Cup, NHL)	1976
Ralph Connor (Charles William Gordon)	Novelist	1938
James Cook	Explorer, surveyor	1954
Chloe Cooley	Enslaved protestor	2022
George Copway (Kahgegagahbowh)	Writer, indigenous rights leader	2018
William Cormack	Explorer (Newfoundland)	1953
Ernest Cormier	Architect	2018
Louis de la Corne, Chevalier de la Corne	Military officer	1953
Edward Cornwallis	Military officer, Governor (Nova Scotia), founded Halifax	1974
Phillips Cosby	Military commander (Royal Navy, Mediterranean)	1945
Laurence Coughlan	Itinerant preacher	1965
George Albertus Cox	Businessman, Senator	1990
James Henry Coyne	President Ontario Historical Society, member Historic Sites and Monuments Board of Canada	1945
Isabella Valancy Crawford	Poet, writer	1947
Helen Creighton	Folklorist, author	2018
James George Aylwin Creighton	Lawyer, engineer, journalist, athlete (development of ice hockey)	2008
Octave Crémazie	Poet	1937
Thomas Crerar	Politician (Progressive Party leader)	2004
Jean-Baptiste de La Croix de Chevrières de Saint-Vallier	Bishop	1990
A. E. Cross	Businessman, politician, co-founder Calgary Stampede	1971
Crowfoot (Isapo-Muxika)	First Nations leader, role in North-West Rebellion	1945
Ernest Alexander Cruikshank	Historian, original chairman Historic Sites and Monuments Board of Canada	1943
Maurice Galbraith Cullen	Artist	1944
Won Alexander Cumyow	Community leader	2024
Samuel Cunard	Businessman (shipping)	1937
Arthur Currie	Military officer (World War I)	1934
Augustin Cuvillier	Speaker (Lower Canada), banker (Bank of Montreal)	1969
Louis Cyr	Wrestler, weightlifter	1976
John Wesley Dafoe	Journalist (Winnipeg Free Press)	1974
William Davidson	Lumberman, politician	1949
Louis Henry Davies	Premier (Prince Edward Island), judge (Chief Justice)	1937
Nicholas Flood Davin	Publisher (The Leader, Regina), politician	1947
John Davis	Arctic explorer	1972
George Mercer Dawson	Scientist, surveyor	1937
John William Dawson	Geologist, university administrator (McGill)	1943
Robert MacGregor Dawson	Political scientist	1975
Louis de Buade de Frontenac	Governor General (New France, pre-Confederation)	1974
Louis-Hector de Callière	Politician, diplomat	2001
Amor De Cosmos	Premier (British Columbia), journalist (British Colonist)	1938
Dorimène Desjardins	Business and co-op organizer	2012
Mazo de la Roche	Novelist	1976
James De Mille	Novelist, humorist, professor	1937
Agathe de Saint-Père de Repentigny (1657–1747)	Symbol of women's entrepreneurism in New France	2016
Charles de Salaberry	Military officer (War of 1812)	1934
Demasduit	Among the final surviving Beothuks	2000
Modeste Demers	Bishop, missionary	1973
George Taylor Denison	Soldier, community leader, founded Canada First Movement, Imperial Federation League	1937
Nicolas Denys	Explorer, trader, colonizer (Acadia)	1924
Carrie Derick	Botanist	2007
Joseph Frederick Wallet DesBarres	Lieutenant-Governor (Cape Breton), cartographer	1925
Alphonse Desjardins	Businessman, began Caisse Populaire system	1971
Viola Desmond	Civil rights activist	2018
Edouard Deville	Surveyor General, developed photogrammetry	1971
Edgar Dewdney	Lieutenant-Governor (Northwest Territories, British Columbia), reassigned territorial capital to Regina	1975
Robert B. Dickey	Father of Confederation	1939
Punch Dickins	Bush pilot	1995
John Diefenbaker	Prime Minister	1981
George Dixon	Boxer	2021
Thomas Dixson	Soldier (Fort Beauséjour)	1938
Donnacona	First Nations leader (Iroquois), kidnapped by Jacques Cartier	1981
Antoine-Aimé Dorion	Cabinet minister (Justice), Chief Justice (Quebec)	1937
Onésime Dorval	Teacher (Saskatchewan)	1954
Arthur Doughty	Dominion Archivist, historian	1991
David Douglas	Botanist (Douglas Fir)	1979
Howard Douglas	Lieutenant-Governor (New Brunswick), Chancellor (King's College, University of New Brunswick)	1925
James Douglas	Governor (Vancouver Island, British Columbia)	1944
Thomas Clement "Tommy" Douglas (1904–1986)	Premier, founding leader of the NDP, father of single payer healthcare	2016
Thomas Douglas, 5th Earl of Selkirk	Philanthropist, colonizer	1943
Gordon Drummond	Military leader, role in War of 1812	1928
Charles Carter Drury	Naval leader	1938
Lyman Duff	Chief Justice, constitutional expert	1971
Frederick Hamilton-Temple-Blackwood, 1st Marquess of Dufferin and Ava	Governor General, diplomat, traveller, writer	1975
Jeanne Dugas	Acadian survivor of multiple displacements, symbol of resilience	2016
Margaret Duley	Novelist (Newfoundland)	1976
Gabriel Dumont	Métis leader, role in North-West Rebellion	1981
Sara Jeannette Duncan	Journalist, author	2016
Charles Avery Dunning	Premier (Saskatchewan); cabinet minister (Finance)	1985
Robert Dunsmuir	Coal miner, industrialist, politician	1971
Maurice Duplessis	Premier (Quebec), founded Union Nationale	1974
Ernest Melville DuPorte	Scientist and teacher known for study of parasites	2010
Ludger Duvernay	Printer-publisher in Lower Canada, revived Saint-Jean-Baptiste celebrations	2019
Dorothy Dworkin	Nurse, businesswoman, supported Jewish immigrants	2009
Timothy Eaton	Businessman	1971
Ezra Butler Eddy	Businessman (forestry products, matches)	1976
Charles Edenshaw (Tahagen, Tahayren)	Artist (Haïda)	1971
Henrietta Edwards	Women's rights activist, reformer	1962
Mina Benson Hubbard Ellis	Explorer, author	2018
J. S. Ewart	Lawyer, role in Manitoba schools dispute	1966
Robert Falconer	University president	1944
Aegidius Fauteux	Librarian, historian	1955
Edward Feild	Clergyman, bishop, academic	2003
Reginald Fessenden	Inventor (radio, sonic depth finder)	1943
Peter Fidler	Explorer, trader, surveyor (Hudson's Bay Company)	1953
William Stevens Fielding	Premier (Nova Scotia), cabinet minister (Finance)	1938
Charles Fisher	Father of Confederation, Premier (New Brunswick)	1939
Charles Fitzpatrick	Chief Justice, Lieutenant-Governor (Quebec), role in North-West Rebellion, lawyer for Louis Riel	1973
Michael Anthony Fleming	Bishop	2003
Sandford Fleming	Engineer and inventor (Standard Time)	1950
James Fletcher	Entomologist	2016
Marc-Aurèle Fortin	Painter	2011
Pierre-Étienne Fortin	Politician, physician	1953
Rose Fortune	Businesswoman, first female police officer in Canada	2018
George Eulas Foster	Politician, academic (League of Nations)	1938
Terry Fox	Humanitarian, athlete (Marathon of Hope)	2008
Luke Fox	Arctic explorer	1972
Gustave Francq	Trade unionist, publisher (Le Monde ouvrier/The Labor World)	2008
John Franklin	Arctic explorer	1945
Archibald Fraser	Industrialist (lumber)	1975
Simon Fraser (1776–1862)	Explorer, fur trader	2016
Louis-Honoré Fréchette	Poet, author	1937
Lillian Bilsky Freiman	Organizer, philanthropist	2008
Benjamin Frobisher	Fur trader (North West Company)	1973
Joseph Frobisher	Fur trader, businessman (North West Company)	1973
Martin Frobisher	Arctic explorer	1957
Thomas Frobisher	Fur trader, established Île-à-la-Crosse post	1973
Northrop Frye	Educator, author, literary critic & theorist	2018
Thomas Fuller (1823–1898)	Architect	2016
Marie-Anne Gaboury	Settler, grandmother of Louis Riel	1982
William James Gage	Publisher (W. J. Gage, textbooks)	1938
Clarence Gagnon	Artist	1944
Larry Gains	Heavyweight boxing champion	2020
Alexander Tilloch Galt	Father of Confederation, politician, businessman	1944
William Francis Ganong	Botanist, cartographer, historian	1945
James Garfield Gardiner	Premier (Saskatchewan), cabinet minister (Agriculture)	1975
François-Xavier Garneau	Historian	1937
Dominique Gaspard	Physician	2024
Pierre Gaultier de La Vérendrye	Explorer, fur trader	1920
Cyril Genik	Supported Ukrainian immigration in western Canada	1995
Antoine Gérin-Lajoie	Journalist, lawyer	1939
Marie Lacoste Gérin-Lajoie	Women's rights activist	1997
Abraham Pineo Gesner	Physician, geologist, inventor of kerosene	1954
John Murray Gibbon	Writer, cultural promoter (Canadian Authors' Association)	1954
Mifflin Wistar Gibbs	Politician, businessman, human rights activist	2009
Alexander Gibson	Industrialist	2007
Robert Giffard de Moncel	Nobleman, colonizer, physician, surgeon	1955
Humphrey Gilbert	Unsuccessful colonizer (Newfoundland)	1981
Edouard Percy Cranwill Girouard	Military engineer, developed African railways	1938
Oliver Goldsmith	Poet	1944
Glenn Gould	Classical musician	2012
Enid Gordon Graham	Physiotherapist	2014
Mary Grannan	Children's author & broadcaster	2018
Cuthbert Grant	Métis leader	1972
George Monro Grant	Educator, writer, university principal (Queen's)	1937
Louis-Pierre Gravel	Promoted settlement and agriculture	1956
John Hamilton Gray	Father of Confederation, Speaker (New Brunswick)	1939
John Hamilton Gray	Father of Confederation, Premier (Prince Edward Island)	1939
Wilfred Grenfell	Medical missionary (Newfoundland and Labrador)	1959
Grey Owl (Archibald Belaney)	Conservationist, author, speaker	1993
Lionel Groulx	Clergyman, historian, Quebec nationalist	1972
Helena Gutteridge	Suffragette and politician	2010
Casimir Gzowski	Lieutenant-Governor (Ontario), engineer, constructed railroads, Niagara Parks Commission chair	1956
Roderick Langmere Haig-Brown	Writer, conservationist	2016
Frederick Haldimand	Governor (Quebec), settler	1974
Arthur Lawrence Haliburton (Lord Haliburton)	Military officer, civil servant	1938
Thomas Chandler Haliburton	Author, satirist	1936
William Neilson Hall	First Victoria Cross recipient of African heritage	2008
Ishbel Hamilton-Gordon, Marchioness of Aberdeen and Temair	Established Victorian Order of Nurses, National Council of Women	1979
Ned Hanlan	Athlete (rowing champion)	1938
Arthur Sturgis Hardy	Premier, Attorney General (Ontario)	1948
James B. Harkin	First national parks commissioner, established Historic Sites and Monuments Board of Canada	1955
Lawren Harris	Artist (Group of Seven)	1970
Robert Harris	Artist (painted Fathers of Confederation)	1945
Ezekiel Hart	Entrepreneur, politician, first Jew to be elected a legislator in the British Empire	1995
Julia Catherine (Beckwith) Hart	Author (St. Ursula's Convent)	1951
John Harvey	Lieutenant-Governor (Prince Edward Island, New Brunswick), Governor (Newfoundland)	1974
Frederick W. A. G. Haultain	Premier (Northwest Territories), Chief Justice (Saskatchewan)	1946
Thomas Heath Haviland	Father of Confederation	1939
Sir Edmund Walker Head, 8th Baronet	Lieutenant-Governor (New Brunswick), Governor General (British North America, pre-Confederation)	1974
Abraham Albert Heaps	Politician and labour leader	2010
Samuel Hearne	Explorer, Governor (Prince of Wales Fort)	1936
Louis-Philippe Hébert	Artist (Quebec sculptor)	1937
Theodor August Heintzman	Manufacturer (pianos)	1974
Anthony Henday	Explorer, fur trader	1953
John Hendry	Industrialist (lumber)	1988
Louis Hennepin	Clergyman, explorer, cartographer	2008
Alexander Henry the elder	Fur trader	1973
Alexander Henry the younger	Fur trader (North West Company)	1973
William Alexander Henry	Father of Confederation	1939
Josiah Henson	Author, abolitionist, minister, role in Underground Railroad	1995
William Hespeler	Businessman, immigration agent, politician	2000
James Jerome Hill	Businessman (Red River Transportation Company, Great Northern Railway)	1938
Francis Hincks	Politician	1969
Ella Cora Hind	Women's rights activist	1997
Henry Youle Hind	Scientist, explorer, surveyor, author	2018
Gilles Hocquart	Administrator, Intendant (New France), established Les Forges du Saint-Maurice	1974
Samuel Holland	Engineer, Surveyor General (Quebec)	1989
Luther Hamilton Holton	Businessman, banker, cabinet minister (Finance)	1938
Adelaide Hoodless	Educational reformer	1960
Frederic William Howay	Historian, lawyer, judge	1944
C. D. Howe	Cabinet minister, established Atomic Energy of Canada	1984
Joseph Howe	Premier (Nova Scotia), role in responsible government	1983
William Pearce Howland	Father of Confederation	1959
James Patrick Howley	Naturalist, geologist	2016
Henry Hudson	Arctic explorer (Hudson and James Bays)	1973
Sam Hughes	Cabinet minister (Militia and Defence), journalist, soldier	1969
William Roper Hull	Businessman, philanthropist, developer	1988
John Peters Humphrey	Human rights advocate, jurist, scholar	2022
George Hunt	Linguist, ethnologist (West Coast cultures)	1989
Harold Innis	Economist, historian (communications theory)	1972
Ipirvik and Taqulittuq	Inuit couple, assisted Arctic exploration	1981
James Isbister	Métis leader	1997
A. Y. Jackson	Artist (Group of Seven)	1974
Albert Jackson	Mail carrier	2024
Charles William Jefferys	Artist	1954
Diamond Jenness	Anthropologist (First Nations culture)	1973
Louis-Amable Jetté	Lieutenant-Governor and Chief Justice (Quebec)	1945
Sylvester Joe	Aboriginal guide	2002
Ethel Johns	Nurse, educator, administrator	2009
Pauline Johnson (Tekahionwakeh)	Poet, speaker (First Nations)	1945
Edward Johnson	Singer, manager (Metropolitan Opera Company)	1974
John Mercer Johnson	Father of Confederation	1939
Louis Jolliet	Explorer (Mississippi River, with Marquette)	1944
Sigtryggur Jónasson	Manitoba politician and Icelandic-Canadian leader	2010
Marie Joseph dite Angélique	Slave	2025
William Judge	Missionary (Yukon)	1987
Peter Jones (Kahkewaquonaby)	First Nations leader, clergyman	1996
Israel Isaac Kahanovitch	Manitoba rabbi and leader	2010
Paul Kane	Artist (Canadian West paintings)	1937
Thomas Keefer	Engineer, railroader (Hamilton Waterworks)	1938
Henry Kelsey	Explorer, fur trader	1931
John Kennedy	Civil engineer (Montreal harbour)	2001
William Frederick King	Surveyor, astronomer, civil servant (established Geodetic Survey of Canada, Dominion Observatory)	1959
Reverend William King	Clergyman, abolitionist	2005
William Lyon Mackenzie King	Prime Minister	1967
Charles Edmund Kingsmill	Founder of the Navy	2010
William Kirby	Writer, historian (Annals of Niagara)	1946
David Kirke	Adventurer, colonizer, Governor (Newfoundland)	1968
A. M. Klein	Writer, lawyer (Jewish literature)	2007
Otto Julius Klotz	Astronomer, geographer (Dominion Observatory)	1938
Leon Joseph Koerner	Industrialist (forestry)	2009
Kondiaronk	Negotiator (Treaty of 1701)	2001
Cornelius Krieghoff	Artist	1972
Chief Kw'eh	Leader of Dakelh people, British Columbia	2011
John Kinder Labatt	Businessman (brewery)	1971
Curé Antoine Labelle	Colonizer of the Laurentians, priest, politician	2019
Albert Lacombe	Missionary	1932
Édouard Lacroix	Businessman, politician	2006
Louis-Hippolyte Lafontaine	Jurist, statesman, co-Premier (Province of Canada, pre-Confederation)	1937
Jean-Baptiste Lagimodière	Trapper, grandfather of Louis Riel	1981
David Laird	Lieutenant-Governor (Northwest Territories), cabinet minister (Interior)	1950
John Lambton, 1st Earl of Durham	Governor General, High Commissioner (British North America)	1974
Catherine Beaulieu Bouvier Lamoureux	Defender of Métis culture	2011
Archibald Lampman	Poet	1920
Pierre-Amand Landry	Lawyer, judge, politician, first Acadian to be knighted	1955
Franklin Knight Lane	American politician, born in Prince Edward Island	1938
Hector-Louis Langevin	Father of Confederation, cabinet minister (Public Works)	1938
Sam Langford	Boxer	1987
Ernest Lapointe	Cabinet minister	1954
Margaret Laurence	Novelist, academic	2016
Wilfrid Laurier	Prime Minister	1938
François de Laval	Bishop	1972
Calixa Lavallée	Musician ("O Canada")	1966
Marguerite Vincent Lawinonkié	Artist	2008
Sheridan Lawrence	Farmer, businessman, judge	1954
Olivier Le Jeune	First Black resident, first Black slave	2022
James MacPherson Le Moine	Author, historian, ornithologist (Royal Society of Canada)	1938
Pierre Le Moyne d'Iberville	Soldier, explorer, administrator	1937
Jean-Baptiste Le Moyne, Sieur de Bienville	Governor (Louisiana), founded Mobile, Alabama and New Orleans	1953
Charles le Moyne de Longueuil et de Châteauguay and family	Family of soldiers and colonizers	1957
Stephen Leacock	Writer, economist, particularly as humorist	1946
Ozias Leduc	Painter	2018
Camille Lefebvre	Clergyman, established Acadian Renaissance Movement	1997
Jean-Louis Légaré	Settler, trader	1969
Rodolphe Lemieux	Speaker and cabinet minister (House of Commons), professor	1973
Charles Lennox, 4th Duke of Richmond	Governor General	1923
Irma LeVasseur	Physician (pediatrics)	2008
Arthur Lismer	Artist (Group of Seven)	1974
Philip Francis Little	Premier (pre-confederation Newfoundland), role in responsible government	2007
Kathleen 'Kay' Livingstone	Feminist-activist for blacks	2011
George Lloyd	Bishop, helped found Lloydminster	1953
George Locke	Librarian (Toronto Public Libraries), author, historian	1939
Grace Annie Lockhart	First woman in British Empire to receive university bachelor's degree	1991
William Edmond Logan	Geologist (director, Geological Survey of Canada)	1967
Jean-Baptiste Lolo	Interpreter, guide, trader, peacemaker	2012
Tom Longboat	Athlete, Boston Marathon winner	1976
Frances Loring	Sculptor	2011
Albert Peter Low	Geologist, explorer, athlete, surveyor	1972
John MacIntosh Lyle	Architect (Beaux-Arts style)	2008
Archibald Macallum	Biochemist, founded National Research Council	1938
Thomas Bassett Macaulay	Businessman (insurance)	1997
Andrew Archibald Macdonald	Father of Confederation	1939
James E.H. MacDonald	Artist (Group of Seven)	1974
Margaret C. MacDonald	Nurse (World War I)	1982
John MacDonald of Glenaladale	Organized settlement of PEI	2012
John A. Macdonald	Father of Confederation, Prime Minister	1939
William Christopher Macdonald	Manufacturer, philanthropist (Macdonald Tobacco)	1974
Alexander Macdonell	Bishop	1924
Angus Bernard MacEachern	Bishop	1968
Elsie MacGill	Aeronautical engineer	2007
Helen Gregory MacGill	Judge, campaigned for women's suffrage	1998
Agnes Maule Machar	Patriotic writer, social commentator	2015
Alexander Mackenzie	Explorer	2016
Alexander Mackenzie	Prime Minister	1957
William Mackenzie	Railway entrepreneur (Canadian Northern Railway)	1976
William Lyon Mackenzie	Politician, journalist, led Upper Canada Rebellion	1949
Pegi Nicol MacLeod	Modernist painter	2011
Archibald MacMechan	Professor, writer	1946
H. R. MacMillan	Forester, industrialist	1987
Ernest MacMillan	Musician, composer, conductor	1984
Helen MacMurchy	Doctor, author, health care reformer	1997
Allan MacNab	Premier (Province of Canada), politician, judge	1937
John Macoun	Botanist, advocate of the West	2011
Agnes Macphail	First female Member of Parliament	1985
Andrew Macphail	Physician, author, professor	1945
Charles Alexander Magrath	Surveyor, engineer, first mayor of Lethbridge, Alberta	1950
Charles Mair	Poet, nationalist, promoted western development	1937
Jeanne Mance	Settler, nurse, established hospital (Hôtel-Dieu de Montréal)	1998
Donald Mann	Railroader (Canadian Northern Railway)	1976
Charles Marega	Artist	2009
Marie-Victorin	Botanist, monastic, author, educator	1987
Jacques Marquette	Priest, explorer (Mississippi River, with Louis Jolliet)	1937
Paul Mascarene	Lieutenant-Governor (Nova Scotia), defended Annapolis Royal	1929
Kèsh (Skookum Jim Mason)	Explorer, discovered gold (Yukon)	1994
Vincent Massey	Governor General	1974
Hart Massey	Businessman, philanthropist (Massey-Harris, Massey Hall)	1971
Matonabbee	First Nations leader, role in Samuel Hearne expedition	1981
Wilfrid R. "Wop" May	Aviator (World War I ace, established bush piloting)	1974
Peter McArthur	Writer, farmer	1946
Richard McBride	Premier and Agent General (British Columbia)	1938
Francis Leopold McClintock	Arctic explorer	1972
Nellie McClung	Politician, feminist, social activist (first female board member of CBC)	1954
Robert McClure	Arctic explorer	1972
Grant McConachie	Businessman, aviator (development of northwestern Canadian service)	2007
David Ross McCord	Lawyer, philanthropist, founded McCord Museum in Montreal	2000
John McCrae	Physician, soldier, poet ("In Flanders Fields")	1946
Thomas McCulloch	Educator (Pictou Academy, Dalhousie College)	1959
Jonathan McCully	Father of Confederation	1939
John Alexander Douglas McCurdy	Aviator (first to pilot an aircraft in British Empire), Lieutenant-Governor (Nova Scotia)	1974
George Millward McDougall	Missionary, role in Treaty 6	1969
William McDougall	Father of Confederation, politician	1943
Duncan McNab McEachran	Veterinarian	2016
Thomas D'Arcy McGee	Father of Confederation, writer, Irish nationalist	1943
Frances Gertrude McGill	Physician	2024
Donald McKay	Ship designer and builder	1938
R. Tait McKenzie	Surgeon, artist, physical educator	1958
Louise McKinney	First female legislator in the British Empire (Alberta)	1939
Samuel McLaughlin	Businessman, philanthropist (automotive industry)	1989
John McLoughlin	Hudson's Bay Company chief factor, "Father of Oregon"	1951
Marshall McLuhan	Professor, author (media analysis)	2007
William McMaster	Businessman, Senator, banker	1990
Violet Clara McNaughton	Social reformer (Women Grain Growers)	1997
Alexander James McPhail	Social reformer (agriculture), Canadian Wheat Pool president	1971
Arthur Meighen	Prime Minister	1961
Jean-Baptiste Meilleur	Doctor, educator	2002
Henri Membertou (Anli-Maopeltoog)	First Nations leader, role in establishing Mi'kmaq-French Alliance	1981
Men of Letters (Acadia) – (Pascal Poirier, Placide Gaudet, John Clarence Webster, Israël Landry and Ferdinand Robidoux)	Writers (Acadia)	1955
Charles de Menou d'Aulnay	Governor (Acadia), colonizer	1972
Honoré Mercier	Premier (Quebec), journalist, lawyer	1938
William Hamilton Merritt	Businessman, role in building the Welland Canal	1974
Mikak	Female symbol of Inuit self-determination	2011
David Mills	Cabinet minister (Interior and Justice)	1954
David Milne (1882–1953)	Artist	2016
Mattie Mitchell	Mi'kmaq guide, prospector, explorer and hunter (Newfoundland)	2001
Peter Mitchell	Father of Confederation, Prime Minister (New Brunswick, pre-Confederation)	1938
Mokwina	First Nations leader (Moachat Confederacy)	1987
John Molson	Brewer, entrepreneur	2021
William Molson	Businessman	1971
Charles Monck, 4th Viscount Monck	First Governor General of Confederation	1974
Joseph Montferrand	Folk hero	2023
Lucy Maud Montgomery	Author (Anne of Green Gables)	1943
Frederick Montizambert	Physician, civil servant (quarantining)	1998
Geraldine Moodie	Photographer	2024
Susanna Moodie	Author, settler	1975
Sewell Moody	Businessman (sawmills)	1988
Howie Morenz	Hockey player	1976
Frederick Cleveland Morgan	Montreal museum curator	2012
Henry James Morgan	Author, historian, archivist	2016
Adrien-Gabriel Morice	Missionary, author	1948
Augustin-Norbert Morin	Lawyer, Superior Court Justice, role in Reform Coalition	1938
James Wilson Morrice	Artist	1954
Alexander Morris	Chief Justice (Manitoba), politician, role in 1864 Great Coalition	1971
Arthur Silver Morton	Teacher, historian, archivist (Saskatchewan)	1952
William Richard Motherwell	Cabinet minister (Agriculture); established Territorial Grain Growers' Association	1966
Oliver Mowat	Father of Confederation, Premier (Ontario)	1934
Brian Mulroney	Prime minister	2025
John Munn	Newfoundland outport merchant, civic leader	2016
Beamish Murdoch	Lawyer, politician, writer	1937
Emily Murphy	First female judge in British Empire, author, women's rights activist	1958
James Murray	Governor (Quebec), Military Governor (Quebec District)	1955
Leonard W. Murray	Admiral (North Atlantic Convoy, World War II)	1977
Anthony Musgrave	Governor (Newfoundland, British Columbia), role in British Columbia joining Confederation	1975
Nahnebahwequay	Ojibwa spokeswoman and Christian missionary	2021
James Naismith	Inventor of basketball, physician, promoter of physical education	1976
Thomas Nangle	Cleric, chaplain, war memorial planner, politician	2016
Neekaneet	First Nations leader (Plains Cree)	1981
John Neilson	Politician, editor, journalist, reformer	1976
Émile Nelligan	Poet (L'École littéraire de Montréal)	1974
Nescambiouit	First Nations leader	2005
Simon Newcomb	Astronomer, mathematician (United States Naval Observatory, Nautical Almanac)	1935
Gilbert Stuart Newton	Artist (Royal Academy)	1944
Margaret Newton	Scientist (agriculture, grains)	1996
Guido Nincheri	Artist, decorator	2007
Percy Erskine Nobbs	Architect	2008
Charles Sherwood Noble	Inventor (agricultural machinery)	2002
John Norquay	Premier (Manitoba), Métis statesman	1943
John Norton (Teyoninhokarawen)	Native political and military leader	2011
William Notman	Photographer, businessman	1975
Harold Anthony Oaks	Bush pilot (Patricia Airways)	1974
Jonathan Odell	Poet, clergyman, surgeon, Secretary (New Brunswick)	1959
William Ogilvie	Commissioner (Yukon), surveyor, explorer, author	1970
Joseph Oleskiw	Professor, promoted Ukrainian immigration	1996
Frank Oliver	Cabinet minister (Interior), journalist	1947
Onondeyoh (Frederick Ogilvie Loft)	Opposed residential schools, founded League of Indians	2019
David Oppenheimer	Mayor (Vancouver), businessman, Jewish community leader	2008
Oronhyatekha	First Canadian First Nations physician	2001
William Osler	Physician, medical researcher and educator	1950
Léo-Ernest Ouimet	Filmmaker, producer, distributor, theatre operator	2018
Daniel David Palmer	Founded chiropractic medicine	1993
Edward Palmer	Father of Confederation, Premier (Prince Edward Island)	1939
Théophile Panadis	Defender of Abenaki traditions	2011
Louis-Joseph Papineau	Politician, lawyer, seigneur (Montebello, la Petite-Nation), Patriot Movement leader	1937
Étienne Parent	Civil servant, journalist, editor Le Canadien	1974
Sir Gilbert Parker, 1st Baronet	Politician, author (romance novels)	1938
Elizabeth Parker	Co-founded Alpine Club of Canada	2011
George Robert Parkin	Author, educator, Imperial Federation Movement leader	1938
Irene Parlby	Politician, rural leader, campaigned to allow women in the Senate	1966
William Edward Parry	Arctic explorer	1971
Edward Alexander Partridge	Agrarian activist, farmer, author	2018
Walter Patterson	Governor (Prince Edward Island)	1974
Andrew Paull	Squamish leader, rights advocate	2012
The Peacemakers: Albert Lacombe, John McDougall	Brokered peace between First Nations groups	1932
William Pearce	Surveyor, planner (western Canada)	1973
Lester B. Pearson	Prime Minister	1974
Paul Peel	Artist (of the French Academic School)	1937
Francis Pegahmagabow	War hero and activist for Native rights	2019
Chief Peguis	First Nations leader	2008
Wilfrid Pelletier	Orchestra conductor, founded Conservatoire de musique et d'art dramatique du Québec	1988
Wilder Penfield	Neurosurgeon (Montreal Neurological Institute)	1988
Simeon Perkins	Businessman, diarist, politician	1946
Nicolas Perrot	Explorer, diplomat, fur trader	1952
Thomas Peters	Advocate for African-Americans in Nova Scotia after the Revolution; founder of Sierra Leone	2022
Piapot	First Nations leader	1981
Richard Pierpoint	Senegalese slave fought for Britain in the American Revolution and War of 1812; formed the Colored Corps	2020
Poundmaker (Pitikwahanapiwiyin)	First Nations leader	1967
Peter Pitseolak	Photographer, artist, historian, hunter	1981
John Stanley Plaskett	Astronomer (Dominion Astrophysical Observatory)	1949
Peter Pond	Fur trader, cartographer, explorer (role in establishing North West Company)	1951
Georgina Pope	Nurse (first matron of Army Medical Corps)	1983
James Colledge Pope	Premier (Prince Edward Island), cabinet minister (Marine and Fisheries)	1938
Joseph Pope	Civil servant, author	1938
William Henry Pope	Father of Confederation	1939
Charles Gavan Power	Defense Minister, expanded Air Force	2013
Philip Louis Pratley	Bridge designer (Dominion Bridge Company)	2005
E. J. Pratt	Poet	1975
Richard Preston	Escaped slaved, black community leader	2005
George Prevost	President	2016
William Price	Businessman, politician (forest products)	2003
Thomas George "Tommy" Prince	Decorated war veteran (WWII, Korea), Native activist	2019
Léon Abel Provancher	Priest, naturalist, author	1994
Pierre-Esprit Radisson	Explorer, cartographer, fur trader, role in Hudson's Bay Company	1971
John Rae	Explorer, physician, fur trader	1973
James Ralston	Cabinet minister (National Defence)	1973
Alice Ravenhill	Educator, author, social and educational reformer	2008
Donald Strathearn Rawson	Limnologist and conservationist	2019
Red Crow	First Nations leader (Blood tribe), signatory to Treaty 7	1977
John Reeves	Judge, historian	1995
George Agnew Reid	Artist, president (Ontario Society of Artists, Royal Canadian Academy of Art)	1948
Marcel-François Richard	Role in Acadia – developed flag, anthem and patron day	2004
William Buell Richards	Supreme Court of Canada judge	1938
Harriette Taber Richardson	Promoted reconstruction of Port Royal Habitation	1949
John Richardson	Soldier (War of 1812), poet, novelist, established New Era journal	1938
Louis Riel	Métis leader, role in North-West Rebellion	1956
John William Ritchie	Father of Confederation, Nova Scotia Supreme Court Justice	1959
Joseph-Noël Ritchot	Clergyman	1990
Charles G.D. Roberts	Poet	1945
Charles Walker Robinson	Soldier, author	1938
John Beverley Robinson	Mayor (Toronto), Lieutenant-Governor (Ontario), leader of Family Compact	1937
John Robson	Premier (British Columbia), established first British Columbia newspaper	1938
Rufus Nathaniel Rockhead	Entrepreneur	2024
Marie Marguerite Rose	Abolitionist, freed slave	2008
Sir John Rose, 1st Baronet	Politician, banker, diplomat	1973
Bobbie Rosenfeld	Athlete (Olympic gold medalist)	1976
Alexander Ross	Fur trader, author, role in Pacific Fur Company and North West Company	1951
James Hamilton Ross	Member of North-West Council and Assembly, Commissioner (Yukon)	1948
George William Ross	Premier (Ontario), Senate Liberal leader	1937
James Clark Ross	Arctic explorer	1972
John Ross	Arctic explorer	1972
John Rowand	Fur trader, Chief factor (Hudson's Bay Company)	1954
Gabrielle Roy	Author	2008
Louis Rubenstein	Champion figure skater, sports administrator/promoter	2016
Ernest Rutherford	Physicist (nuclear pioneer)	1939
Egerton Ryerson	Clergyman, educator, politician, school advocate	1934
Mary Anne Sadlier	Author (religious subjects)	2008
Idola Saint-Jean	Women's rights activist	1997
Bernard Keble Sandwell	Editor, writer, role in Saturday Night	1955
Edward Sapir	Anthropologist, linguist, expert on First Nations	1983
Margaret Marshall Saunders	Author	1947
Charles E. Saunders	Agronomist (Marquis wheat)	1938
William Saunders	Pharmacist, scientist, civil servant, author, role with Experimental farms	1952
Jeanne Sauvé	Governor general	2025
Savalette	Established Acadian "sedentary" fisheries	1944
Frank W. Schofield	Veterinarian	2009
Jacob Gould Schurman	Educator, philosopher, academic president (Cornell University)	1943
Duncan Campbell Scott	Poet (Confederation poets)	1948
Richard William Scott	Politician, supported Ontario Separate School Act	1938
Joseph E. Seagram	Alcohol distiller, politician	1971
Laura Secord	Heroine, War of 1812	2002
Hans Selye	Medical researcher (stress)	1989
Ernest Thompson Seton	Writer, conservationist, artist, social reformer	1995
Jonathan Sewell	Chief Justice (Lower Canada), supported Confederation	1956
Mary Ann Shadd	Editor, leader (Black Refugee Movement)	1994
Shanawdithit	Last surviving Beothuk	2000
Ambrose Shea	Father of Confederation, Speaker (Newfoundland House)	1959
Francis Joseph Sherman	Poet, banker	1945
Adam Shortt	Historian, author, role in Canadian Civil Service Commission	1938
Clifford Sifton	Cabinet minister (Interior), promoted immigration	1955
John Graves Simcoe	Lieutenant-Governor (Upper Canada), military leader (Queen's Rangers)	1974
George Simpson	Governor-in-Chief (Rupert's Land), General Superintendent (Hudson's Bay Company)	1927
Thomas Simpson	Arctic explorer	1937
Oscar D. Skelton	Historian, economist, established Department of External Affairs	1947
Frank Leith Skinner	Horticulturalist	1997
Joshua Slocum	Mariner, explorer, author, first solo sailor to travel throughout the world	1957
Charlotte Small	Métis figure, role in fur trade	2008
Joey Smallwood	Father of Confederation, Premier (Newfoundland)	1996
Elizabeth Smellie	First World War nursing Sister	2011
Albert James Smith	Premier (New Brunswick), cabinet minister (Marine and Fisheries)	1949
Donald Smith, 1st Baron Strathcona and Mount Royal	Fur trader, railroader (Canadian Pacific), politician, role with Hudson's Bay Company	1971
Goldwin Smith	Historian, journalist	1975
Marie Rose (Delorme) Smith	Symbol of female Métis resilience	2022
Mary Ellen Smith	Politician	2016
Mary Agnes Snively	Nursing advocate	2011
Mary Meager Southcott	Nurse, superintendent	1998
Louis St. Laurent	Prime Minister	1973
Sam Steele	Soldier, Superintendent (North-West Mounted Police)	1938
William Steeves	Father of Confederation, industrialist, senator	1939
Vilhjalmur Stefansson	Arctic explorer	1964
Stephan G. Stephansson	Poet	1946
George Stephen, 1st Baron Mount Stephen	Banker, railroader (Canada Pacific Railway), philanthropist	1971
John Stewart	PEI historian, politician	2022
Emily Stowe	First woman to practise as a Canadian doctor, women's rights activist	1995
John Strachan	Bishop, founded King's College	1925
Gilfred Studholme	Army officer, role in constructing Fort Howe	1927
Benjamin Sulte	Historian (French Canada)	1928
Alexandre-Antonin Taché	Bishop, missionary, writer	1943
Étienne-Paschal Taché	Father of Confederation, headed Coalition Government	1937
François-Xavier Picard Tahourenche	Archivist	2008
Jean Talon	Intendant (New France)	1974
Joseph Israël Tarte	Journalist, politician, cabinet minister (Public Works)	1973
Tecumseh	First Nations leader, role in War of 1812	1931
James Teit	Ethnographer (First Nations)	1994
Tessouat dubbed "le Borgne de l'isle"	First Nation leader	1983
Thanadelthur	First Nations figure, role in northern fur trade	2000
George McCall Theal	Educator, historian, archivist (South Africa)	1937
Louis Thomas (Maliseet)	Defended Maliseet rights and interests	2002
William Thomas	Architect	1974
David Thompson	Fur trader, cartographer, surveyor	1927
John Sparrow David Thompson	Prime Minister	1937
Stanley Thompson	Architect (golf courses)	2005
Charles Poulett Thomson, 1st Baron Sydenham	Governor General, established Union of the Canadas	1926
Edward William Thomson	Writer (editorials for Globe, Toronto)	1938
Tom Thomson	Artist (influenced the Group of Seven)	1958
Samuel Leonard Tilley	Father of confederation, cabinet minister	1937
William Tomison	Role in Hudson's Bay Company	1974
Henry Marshall Tory	University president, first National Research Council president	1949
Catharine Parr Traill	Author	1974
Jennie Kidd Trout	First Canadian woman licensed as physician	1995
Pierre Trudeau	Prime Minister	2001
Joseph Trutch	Lieutenant-Governor (British Columbia)	1975
Ignace-Nicolas Vincent Tsawenhohi	First Nations leader	2001
Harriet Tubman	Abolitionist, humanitarian (Underground Railroad)	2005
Charles Tupper	Prime Minister, Father of Confederation	1957
William Ferdinand Alphonse Turgeon	Attorney General (Saskatchewan), diplomat, judge	1981
Wallace Rupert Turnbull	Inventor, aeronautical engineer (wind tunnel)	1960
Philip Turnor	Surveyor, cartographer (Hudson's Bay Company surveyor)	1973
Joseph Tyrrell	Geologist, historian, cartographer (Geological Survey of Canada)	1970
James Boyle Uniacke	Premier (Nova Scotia)	1938
Alexandre Vachon	Priest	2023
William Cornelius Van Horne	Railroader (Canadian Pacific)	1954
George Vancouver	Explorer	1933
Georges Vanier	Governor General, soldier, Ambassador (to France)	1983
Frederick Varley	Artist (Group of Seven)	1974
Madeleine de Verchères	Defended family fort	1923
Peter Vasilevich Verigin	Christian Community of Universal Brotherhood, Doukhobor emigration	2008
Louis-Guillaume Verrier	Founded law school	1952
Samuel Vetch	Soldier, Governor (Nova Scotia)	1928
Hiram Walker	Industrialist, developed distillery, ferry and railway in Windsor, Ontario	1971
Horatio Walker	Artist, Royal Academy of Art	1939
Byron Edmund Walker	Businessman, arts patron	1938
Provo Wallis	Royal Navy officer, capture USS Chesapeake, War of 1812	1945
James Morrow Walsh	North-West Mounted Police, Commissioner of Yukon	1967
Angus J. Walters	Fishing captain	2005
John Ware	Pioneer cowboy, steer-wrestler	2022
Homer Ransford Watson	Artist	1939
Ken Watson	Champion curler	2016
Margaret Robertson Watt aka Madge Watt	Associated Country Women of the World	2007
George Edward Watts	Vice-admiral, War of 1812	1945
John Clarence Webster	Surgeon, historian, author, professor, chair Historic Sites and Monuments Board of Canada	1950
Chanie Wenjack	Student escapee	2025
John Wentworth	Lieutenant-Governor Nova Scotia	1974
Philip Westphal	Navy Admiral	1945
George Augustus Westphal	Navy Admiral	1945
Arthur Oliver Wheeler	Surveyor, National Park Movement, Alpine Club	1995
Seager Wheeler	Agriculturist	1976
Edward Whelan	Father of Confederation, journalist, speaker	1939
Richard Whitbourne	Newfoundland businessman, promoted settlement	1984
Portia White	Musician	1995
Healey Willan	Musician, professor	1984
John Stephen Willison	Editor	1938
Thomas Willson	Inventor (noted for acetylene)	1972
Lemuel Allan Wilmot	Lieutenant-Governor New Brunswick, politician and judge	1938
Robert Duncan Wilmot	Father of Confederation, Senator	1959
Alice Evelyn Wilson	Scientist, teacher	2011
Cairine Reay Mackay Wilson	First woman Senator	2005
Ethel Wilson	Modernist fiction writer	2011
Mona Gordon Wilson	Prince Edward Island Public Health Nursing Division	2008
Edward Winslow	Loyalist; founded Fredericton, settlements in Saint John River Valley	1951
Hirsch Wolofsky, aka Harry Wolofsky	Montreal Jewish community leader; founded Eagle Publishing Company	2007
William Wolseley	Royal Navy Admiral (East Indies, Mediterranean)	1945
Wong Foon Sien	Chinese-Canadian activist	2008
Henry Wise Wood	Founded Canada Wheat Pools	1962
J. S. Woodsworth	CCF leader	1972
Philemon Wright	Lumber merchant, Ottawa Valley settler	1976
George MacKinnon Wrong	Professor	1950
Florence Wyle	Sculptor	2011
James Lucas Yeo	War of 1812 Commander	1937
Nellie Yip Quong	Community advocate; Euro-Canadian/Chinese Canadian intermediary	2008
John Young	Farmer, businessman, agricultural reformer	1951
William Young	Premier (Nova Scotia), judge	1951
Marie-Marguerite d'Youville	Saint, founded Order of the Sisters of Charity	1973

== See also ==
- Canada: A People's History
- Fathers of Confederation
- Heritage Minutes
- List of Canadian awards
- List of National Historic Sites of Canada
- List of Canadian Victoria Cross recipients
- List of companions of the Order of Canada
