= Mary Adams =

Mary Adams may refer to:

- Mary Adams (activist) (born 1938), American tax activist who led the repeal of Maine's statewide property tax and efforts to enact a Taxpayer Bill of Rights
- Mary Adams (actress) (1910–1973), American actress
- Mary Adams (broadcaster) (1898–1984), English administrator who helped to develop the BBC's television service in the 1950s
- Mary Adams (codebreaker) (1922–2010), Scottish interceptor for Bletchley Park during World War II
- Mary Adams (educator) (1823–1898), Canadian women's education reformer
- Mary Adams (politician) (born 1952), American member of the North Dakota House of Representatives
- Mary Anne Adams (born 1954), African American lesbian activist, social worker, and public health researcher
- Mary Ann Adams, aka Kudnarto (c. 1832–1855), Aboriginal Australian landowner who was the first Aboriginal woman to legally marry a colonist in South Australia
- Mary Bridges-Adams (1854–1939), British educationalist, socialist, and activist
- A pen name of Elizabeth Stuart Phelps Ward (1844–1911), American author and intellectual
- Mary Mathews Adams (1840–1902), Irish-born American writer and philanthropist
- Mary Kay Adams (born 1962), American television actress
- Mary Kawennatakie Adams (1917–1999), First Nations basketmaker
- Mary Newbury Adams (1837–1901), American women's suffragist and education advocate
- Mary Rose Columba Adams (1832–1891), English Roman Catholic Dominican prioress
- Mary Hall Adams (1816–1860), American book editor and letter writer
- A pseudonym for Communist Party USA activist Williana Burroughs (1882–1945), used in the 1920s
- Mary Adams (purported virgin) (alleged death 1652), a fictional character created for the purpose of the pamphlet The Ranters Monster
- Mary Elizabeth Adams Brown (1842–1918), née Adams, American writer, collector, and curator of musical instruments

== See also ==
- Marie Adams (disambiguation)
- Maria Adams (disambiguation)
