= Louis Thomas =

Louis Thomas may refer to:

== Writers ==
- Louis C. Thomas (1921–2003), French writer, whose stories Abder Isker produced on French television
- Louis Thomas (writer) (1885–1962), French writer

== Other people ==
- Louis Thomas (Maliseet) (c.1766–c.1869), Canadian First Nations chief
- Louis Thomas (musician), one of the musical duo Ladaniva, representing Armenia in Eurovision 2024
- Louis Thomas, Count of Soissons (1657–1702)

== See also ==
- Lewis Thomas (disambiguation)
