= Archibald Fraser =

Archibald Fraser may refer to:

- Archibald Fraser (industrialist) (1869–1932), Scottish-born Canadian industrialist
- Archibald Fraser (politician) (1896–1979), Australian politician and judge
- Archibald Campbell Fraser of Lovat (1736–1815), former British Member of Parliament
- Archie Fraser (born 1959), Scottish professional football player
- Archie Fraser (ice hockey) (1914–1993), Canadian ice hockey player
