= Ulmus pumila 'Chinkota' =

Elm cultivar

- Species: Ulmus pumila
- Cultivar: 'Chinkota'
- Origin: US

Ulmus pumila 'Chinkota' is a Siberian elm cultivar developed from seed of the cultivar 'Dropmore' by the Horticulture & Forestry Department of South Dakota State University c.1955, as one of a seed-produced line of extremely cold-hardy and drought-resistant trees for use in the Great Plains.

== Description ==
'Chinkota' is distinguished from 'Dropmore' by its lower branching habit and earlier dormancy.

== Pests and diseases ==
See under Ulmus pumila. Lime-induced chlorosis is not a problem with this cultivar.

== Cultivation ==
'Chinkota' was extensively trialled during the 1950s in the northern central states of the US by the USDA's Agricultural Research Service. The tree performed very well, and was recommended not only for windbreak and shelterbelt use, but also as an urban ornamental on the high plains area of Kansas and Nebraska. The cultivar is not known to be in cultivation beyond North America.
