= Lewis Thomas (disambiguation) =

Lewis Thomas (1913–1993) was an American writer, physician, educator, policy advisor, and researcher.

Lewis Thomas may also refer to:

- Lewis Thomas (bishop) (died 1561), Bishop of Shrewsbury
- Lewis Cobden Thomas (1865–1928), Welsh international rugby union forward
- Lewis Thomas (politician) (1832–1913), colliery owner and politician in Queensland, Australia
- Lewis Thomas (footballer, born 1997), Welsh goalkeeper for Bristol City
- Lewis Thomas (footballer, born 2002), English goalkeeper for Harrogate Town

== See also ==
- Louis Thomas (disambiguation)
