= Marie Adams (disambiguation) =

Marie Adams (1925–1998), was an American singer.

Marie Adams may also refer to:

- Marie Adams, character in Howling IV: The Original Nightmare

== See also ==
- Kelly-Marie Adams, River City character
- Mary Adams (disambiguation)
- Maria Adams (disambiguation)
