= George Augustus Westphal =

Royal Navy officer (1785–1875)

Admiral Sir George Augustus Westphal
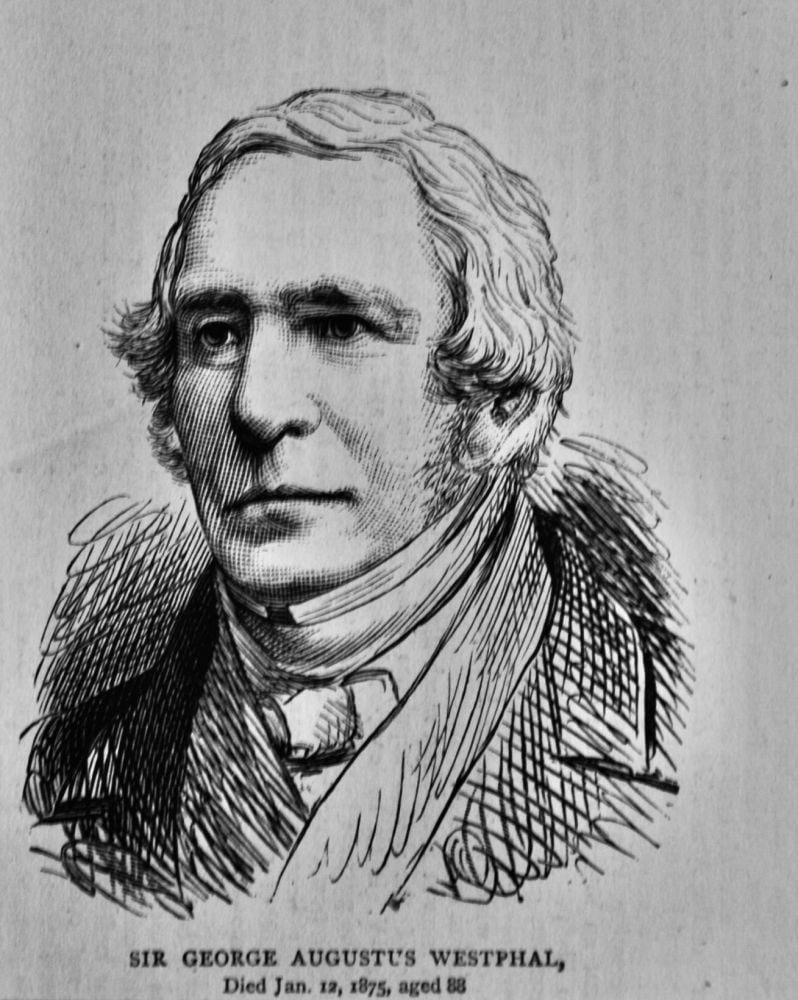
- 1875 portrait of Westphal published in The Graphic
- Born: 27 March 1785; Nova Scotia
- Died: 12 January 1875 (aged 89) Hove, Sussex
- Allegiance: Great Britain; United Kingdom
- Branch: Royal Navy
- Service years: 1798–
- Rank: Admiral
- Commands: HMS Alfred; HMS Columbine; HMS Anaconda; HMS Jupiter; HMS Vernon
- Conflicts: French Revolutionary Wars; Napoleonic Wars; Battle of Trafalgar (WIA); Invasion of Martinique; Walcheren Campaign; Peninsular War; Siege of Cádiz; War of 1812; Raid on Havre de Grace (WIA); Battle of Craney Island; Battle of New Orleans
- Awards: Knight bachelor (1824)

Admiral Sir George Augustus Alexander Westphal (27 March 1785 – 12 January 1875) was a Royal Navy officer who served in the French Revolutionary and Napoleonic Wars and War of 1812. He was a midshipman on HMS Victory during the Battle of Trafalgar.

== Early life ==
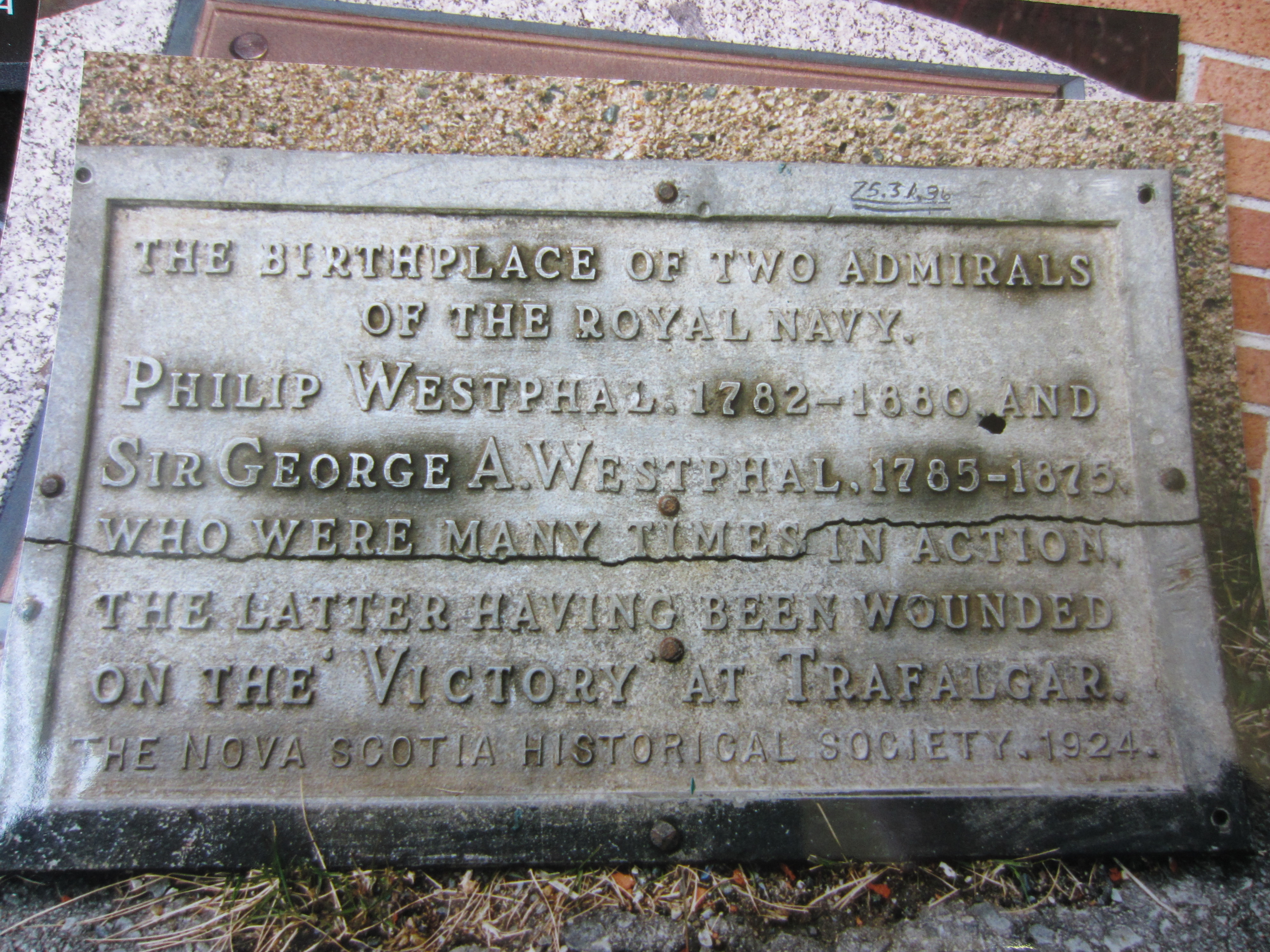
Royal Nova Scotia Historical Society Plaque to Westphal's Birthplace, Dartmouth, Nova Scotia (Dartmouth Heritage Museum)

Westphal was born on 27 March 1785 in Nova Scotia, the son of George Westphal and older brother of Admiral Philip Westphal.

He joined the Royal Navy aged 13 as a first class volunteer on board the Royal navy frigate HMS Porcupine stationed in North America. Later he moved to serve on the home station and in the West Indies as a Masters mate and midshipman on HMS Echo and HMS Tisiphone.

In March 1803 Westphal joined the 32 gun fifth rate frigate HMS Amphion as a midshipman whilst transporting Horatio Nelson to the Mediterranean to take command. Westphal was transferred to HMS Victory.

== Battle of Trafalgar ==
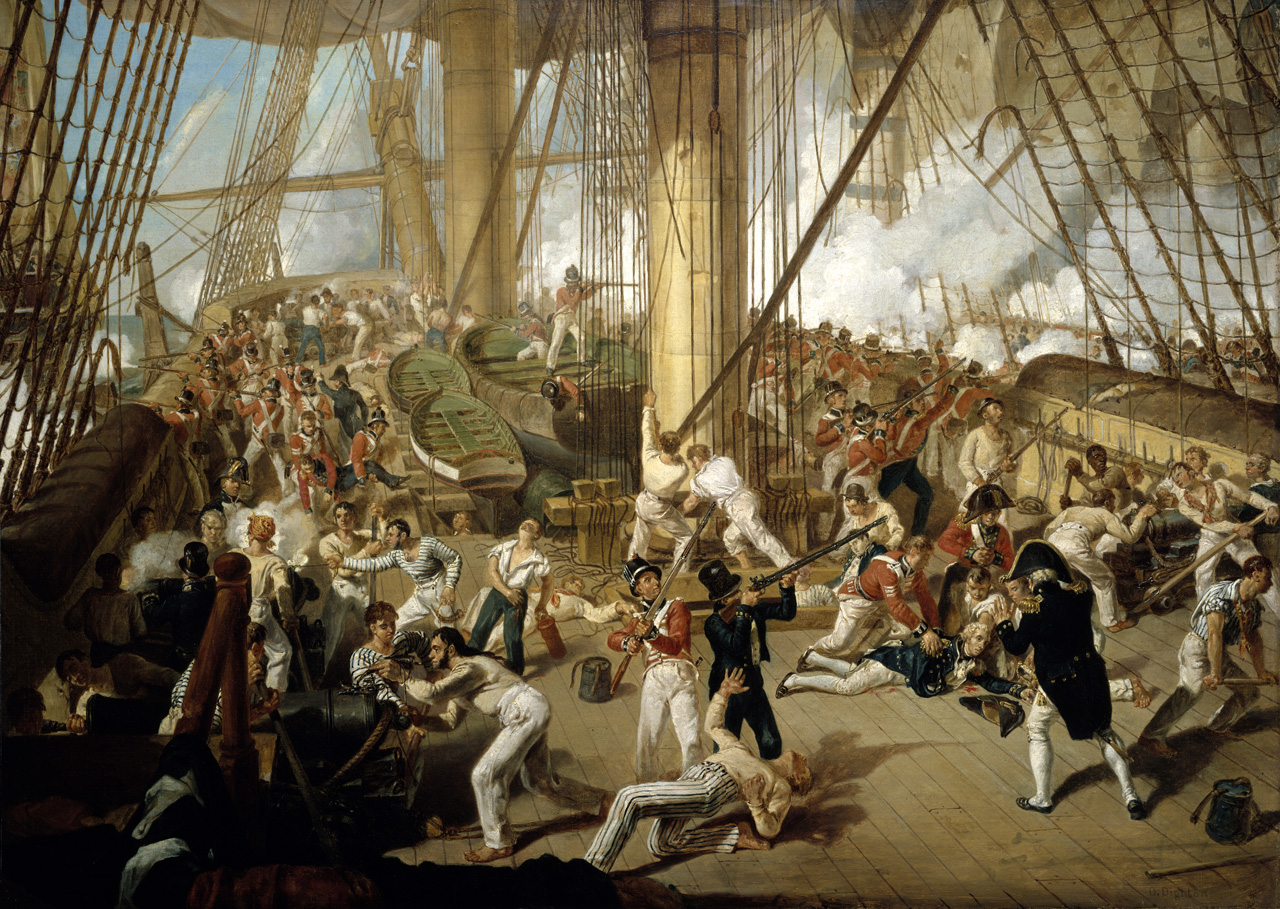
Nelson is shot on the quarterdeck of Victory

On 21 October 1805 Westphal was in the Battle of Trafalgar fighting on Nelson's flagship Victory. Westphal was shot in the head and taken to the sick bay, where he was laid near the injured Nelson.

Westphal explained in an 1842 article in the United Service magazine:

When I was carried down wounded [George wrote], I was placed by the side of his lordship; and his coat was rolled up and put as the substitute for a pillow under my head, which was then bleeding very much from the wound I had received. When the battle was over, and an attempt was made to remove the coat, several of the bullions of the epaulet were found to be so firmly glued, unto my hair, by the coagulated blood from my wound, that the bullions four or five of them, were cut off and left in my hair; one of which I still have in my possession.

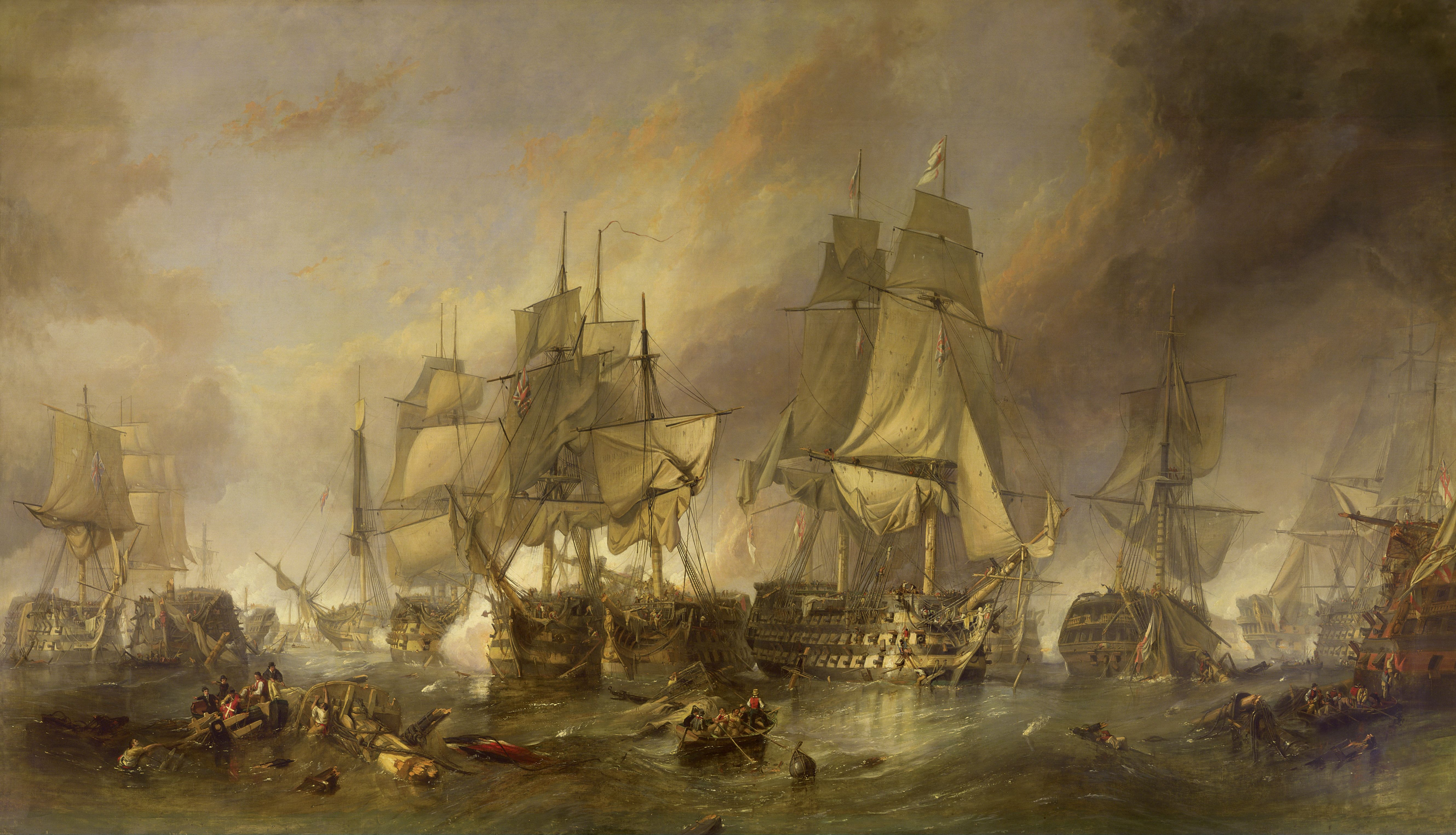
The Battle of Trafalgar by Clarkson Stanfield, 1836

Many years after the battle, the Admiralty asked Westphal to identify Nelson's coat after Prince Albert had bought it for the National Maritime Museum at Greenwich. Westphal was able to authenticate it with his fragments.

== After Trafalgar ==
Westphal served as a midshipman on HMS Ocean, the flagship of Lord Collingwood. Ocean was a 98-gun second-rate ship of the line commanded by Captain Frances Pender.

Westphal went on to serve as a midshipman on HMS Caledonia, a 120-gun first-rate ship of the line and flagship of John Jervis, 1st Earl of St Vincent.

On 15 August 1806 Westphal was promoted to lieutenant on the sloop HMS Demerara in the West Indies. He was captured when the French privateer Alerte took Highlander, the merchant ship he was returning to England on, during which action he was again severely wounded while leading her resistance. However he escaped from prison in Guadeloupe and was picked up by an American ship. He returned to the West Indies as a lieutenant aboard HMS Neptune, and later HMS Belleisle, ships under the command of Commodore Sir George Cockburn. He fought on land during the 1809 invasion of Martinique.

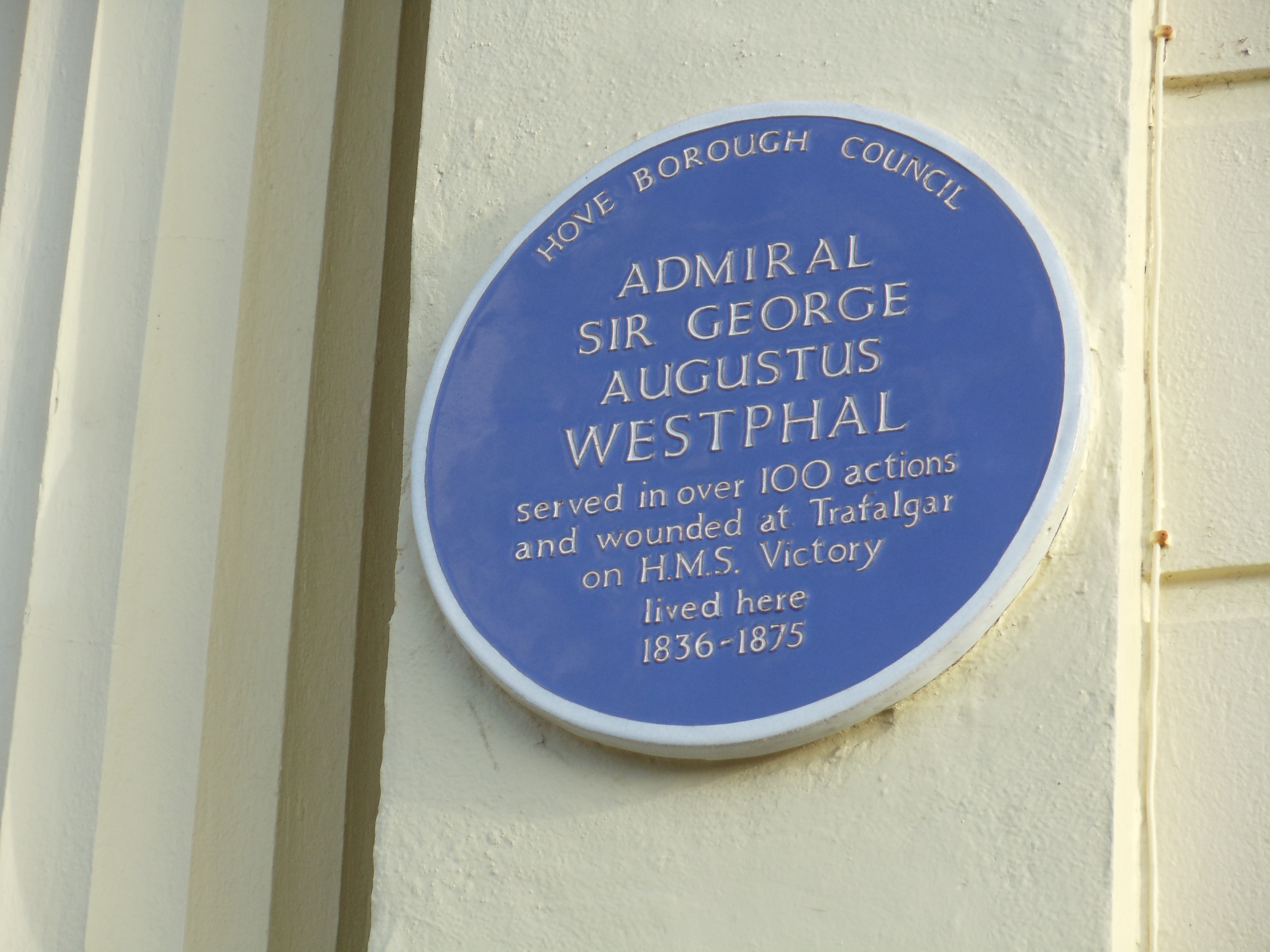
Blue plaque for George Augustus Westphal in Hove.

After another period in home waters, he returned to West Indies where he served aboard HMS Chesapeake. On 11 (or 12) July 1813, Westphal, by then first lieutenant of Sceptre, led a group of boats into Ocracoke Inlet during Rear Admiral Sir George Cockburn's campaign against Portsmouth and Ocracoke Island in North Carolina. Their targets were two privateer schooners, Anaconda and Atlas, as well as a revenue cutter. As the British boats approached, the Americans opened fire. Westphal's division, attacked and captured both privateers. However, the revenue cutter escaped up the Neuse River to New Bern, where she gave warning of the British forces, permitting the preparation of defences that forestalled the Royal Navy from any further advance. Both privateers were condemned at Halifax and the British took them into service, Anaconda under her name, and Atlas as HMS St Lawrence. Westphal, newly promoted to commander with backdate to 8 July, commissioned Anaconda.

The Anaconda was refitted at Halifax, and Westphal received a crew of 60 men, most of whom were the dregs of the fleet, offered by their captains when Admiral John Borlase Warren asked for drafts. Her first task was to escort a convoy of twelve merchant vessels from there to the West Indies. While doing so she fought off an attack by two large American privateers. One of the privateers surrendered after losing her jib-boom and fore-top-mast but then escaped when the Anaconda lost her own fore-top-mast chasing after the second privateer. Warren then transferred the Anaconda to the Jamaica station.

In March 1814, the Anaconda was stationed off the Mississippi Delta under the orders of Captain Clement Milward of HMS Herald.

After their defeat at Fort Bowyer, the British turned their attention to an attack on New Orleans. In the run-up to battle, Captain Nicholas Lockyer captured an American flotilla, consisting primarily of five gunboats, in the Battle of Lake Borgne. Anaconda did not contribute her boats and crew to the battle, but evacuated the 77 men who had been wounded there. During Sir Alexander Cochrane's expedition against New Orleans in December, Cochrane ordered Westphal to lighten Anaconda and to get her into Lake Borgne. Westphal took Anaconda with great difficulty over shoals. Anaconda, gun-vessels, and hired craft then moved the advance guard up the bayou in preparation for the New Orleans. By forcing Anaconda over a bank five miles wide that was only eight feet under water, Westphal was able to get her into position 20 miles ahead of the other British warships where she could protect the boats bringing up supplies and troops. Captain Thomas Hardy of Ramillies wrote in a letter that Anaconda's protection surely saved many of the boats from capture by the Americans.

Westphal later landed with the greater part of Anaconda's crew, who then fought in the naval brigade under Captain Edward Troubridge. At the battle they helped man the batteries.

In February 1815, Anaconda and the schooner Shelburne under Westphal's orders cruised off the Florida coast north of Havana. Anaconda was paid off in April 1815. She underwent a survey at Jamaica that found that she had sustained too much damage in the New Orleans campaign to merit retention in service. Anaconda was condemned and then sold on 5 May 1815. Westphal returned to Britain in July as a passenger aboard Moselle.

== Post-war ==
Westphal married Alicia Chambers in 1817.

He was promoted to post-captain on 12 August 1819. In 1822 Westphal took command of HMS Jupiter, and in her took Lord Amherst to India to serve as governor general. Westphal was knighted on his return to England and served as flag captain to Sir George Cockburn in 1832 but was invalided out of active service in 1834.

== Retirement ==
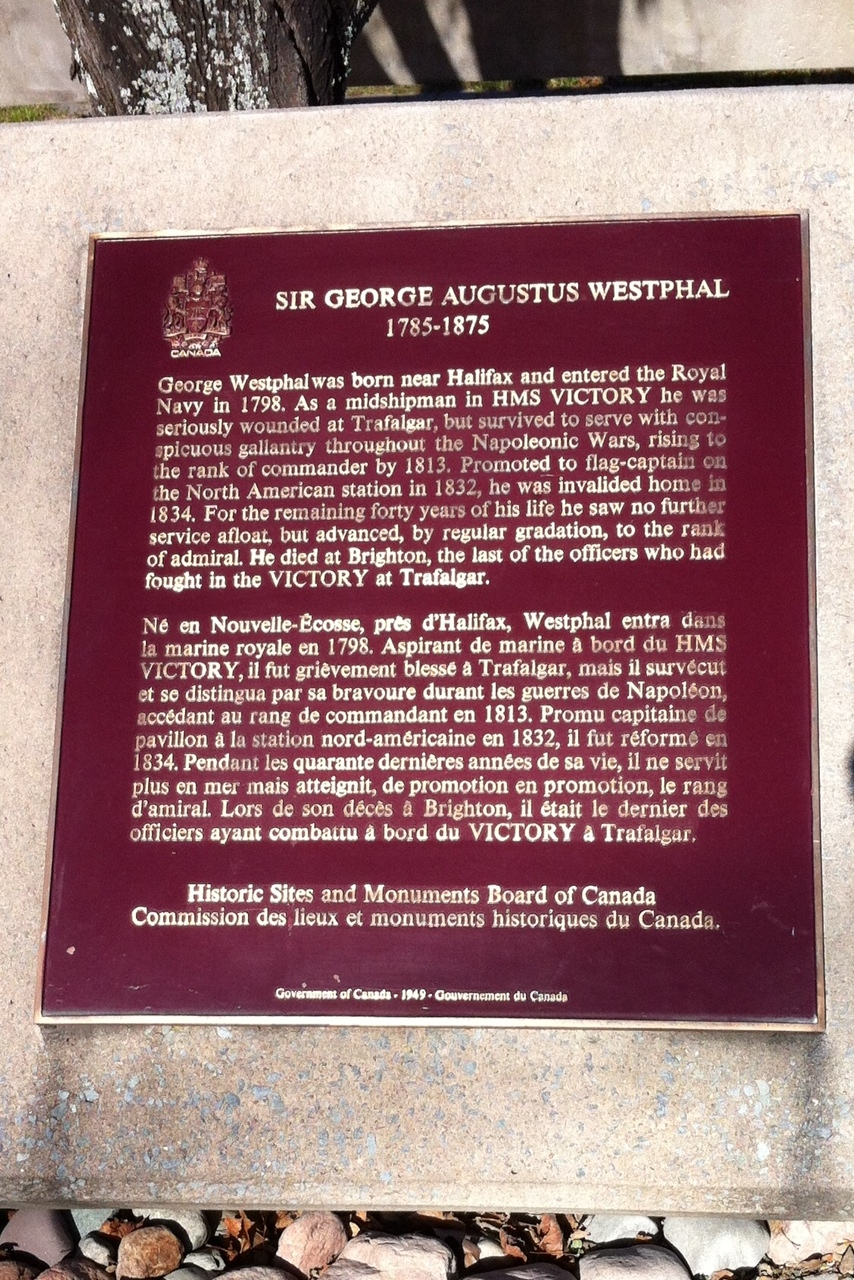
Plaque to Westphal, Admiralty Garden, Stadacona, CFB Halifax, Nova Scotia

Westphal retired to Hove in Sussex where he lived (1836–1875) until his death. On the retired list, he was promoted to rear admiral (17 August 1851), vice admiral (10 September 1857) and finally admiral (23 March 1863).

When Westphal died on 12 January 1875, he was the last surviving Royal Navy officer to have fought at Trafalgar on board HMS Victory. He had lived until the age of 90, some 70 years after seeing Nelson die. He was buried in the family vault at the St Andrew's Church, Church Road, Hove.

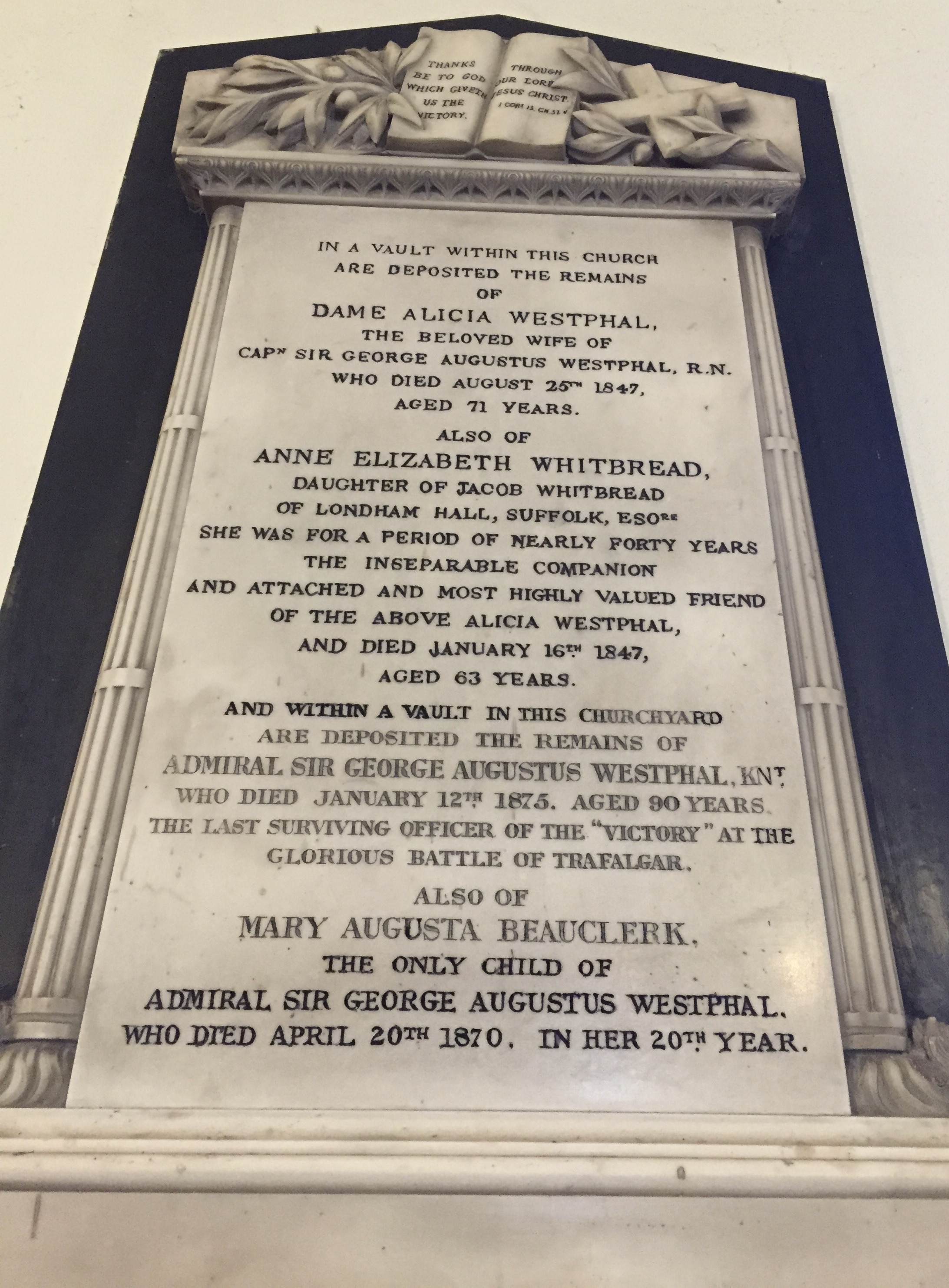
Memorial plaque to Westphal and family, St Andrew's Church, Church Road, Hove

== Legacy ==
- Westphal, Nova Scotia
- Admiral Westphal Elementary School

== See also ==
- O'Byrne, William Richard (1849). "Westphal, George Augustus" . A Naval Biographical Dictionary . John Murray – via Wikisource.
- Military history of Nova Scotia
