= Ulmus pumila 'Harbin' =

Elm cultivar

- Species: Ulmus pumila
- Cultivar: 'Harbin'
- Origin: Manchuria, China

The Siberian Elm cultivar Ulmus pumila 'Harbin' is an older Manchurian selection, grown from seed collected from an area with a similar climate to that of the Great Plains, and superseded in the United States by 'Dropmore'. Green reported (1964) a suggestion to merge 'Harbin' and the Siberian elm cultivar 'Manchu' with 'Dropmore', as all came from the Harbin area.

== Description ==
'Harbin' is a rounded or umbrella-headed tree growing to between 9 and 12 m in height, with fine branchlets bearing narrow leaves 5 cm long.

== Pests and diseases ==
See under Ulmus pumila.

== Cultivation ==
'Harbin' is known to be hardy in the American prairies.
