= Marie Rose (Delorme) Smith =

Mary Rose (Delorme) Smith
- Born: Marie Rose Delorme; October 18, 1861; Saint François-Xavier, Red River Colony, Rupert's Land, British North America
- Died: April 4, 1960 (aged 98); Lethbridge, Alberta, Canada
- Other name: Marie Rose Smith
- Occupations: Rancher, homesteader, medicine woman, midwife, author

Marie Rose (Delorme) Smith (18 October 1861 – 4 April 1960) was a Métis rancher/homesteader, medicine woman, midwife, and author who was noted for her work chronicling the daily life of Métis women. She was declared a Person of National Historic Significance by Parks Canada in 2022.

== Life ==
=== Early life ===
Smith was born Marie Rose Delorme on October 18, 1861, in Saint François-Xavier in the Red River Colony, British North America (present day Manitoba, Canada) . Her father was Urbain Delorme II and her mother was Marie Desmarais. Her father died while she was young, leaving money for her and her sister to attend the Grey Nuns boarding school in Saint Boniface, Manitoba. She attended from the ages of 12 to 16, where she learned to speak and write both English and French. She also remained fluent in Cree, and likely Michif, while attending the school. She spoke about missing the annual routine of traversing the western plains with her family in order to hunt and trade with First Nations people. After four years at the school she returned to her mother, who had remarried.

=== Marriage and homestead ===
Marie Rose was married to Charlie Smith, a robe and whiskey trader who was 17 years older than her, in 1877 following an agreement where her mother would receive 50 dollars. They settled on the Pincher Creek in southern Alberta, building a house and barn on the Jughandle Ranch. Together they had 17 children.

Charlie was often away for long periods of time leaving Marie Rose to raise their children and tend to livestock. She also managed a small home business where she made traditional indigenous clothing and items. She was contracted to make goods for the Hudson's Bay Company and to sew tents for the Canadian Pacific Railway.

Charlie Smith died in 1914. Following this Marie Rose established a second homestead as well as a boarding house in the town of Pincher Creek. She also served as both a midwife and a medicine woman. She was given the nickname of "Buckskin Mary" due to her skills in making gloves and other leather goods. She was one of the few Euro-Canadian and Indigenous women to own property at the time.

=== Writing ===
While raising her children, managing the homestead, and working as a midwife and a medicine woman she also wrote her memoirs, which were never published in full. She had several articles published in the Canadian Cattleman, an early prairie ranch periodical. Her writing is noted as being a rare example of a Métis chronicler specifically writing about the roles of Métis women during the fur trade, buffalo hunting, and homesteading periods, and during cultural changes on the prairies. She also wrote details about the plants and animals around her that were used for food, medicine, and shelter.

=== Later life and death ===
In the later part of her life she spent time with her children, mainly in Lethbridge and Edmonton. She died on April 4, 1960, at the age of 98.

== Legacy ==
Her original log cabin from the Jughandle Ranch is found at the Kootenai Brown Pioneer Village in Pincher Creek.

Archives of her writing can be found in the Glenbow Museum in Calgary. Canadian Cattleman also republished two of her articles in 2014 as part of their history section.

A biography about Marie Rose, Fifty Dollar Bride: Marie Rose Smith, a Chronicle of Metis Life in the 19th Century, was written by her granddaughter Jock Carpenter and published in 1988. Historian Doris Jeanne MacKinnon has written multiple works about Smith after first learning about her during her post-graduate studies at the University of Calgary. These include the 2012 book The Identities of Marie Rose Delorme Smith: Portrait of a Metis Woman, the 2018 book Metis Pioneers: Marie Rose Delorme Smith and Isabella Hardisty Lougheed, and an article in the December 2017-January 2018 issue of Canada's History.

In January 2023 Steven Guilbeault, Minister of Environment and Climate Change announced Marie Rose (Delorme) Smith as one of the 2022 Persons of National Historic Significance as part of Parks Canada's National Program of Historical Commemoration following a recommendation by the Historic Sites and Monuments Board of Canada. As of June 2023 her plaque has not yet been installed.
