= Catherine Beaulieu Bouvier Lamoureux =

Canadian Métis community founder and leader (c. 1820–1918)

Catherine Beaulieu Bouvier Lamoureux (c. 1820 – 1918) was a Métis woman living in the Northwest Territories. She was a founder and leader of the local Métis community.

The daughter of François Beaulieu II and Louise (or Catherine) St. Germain, she was born in the Salt River region near Fort Smith. In 1845, she was baptized into the Roman Catholic Church and attended the Grey Nuns school in St. Boniface. The Grey Nuns founded a hospital and school in Fort Providence in 1867, and Beaulieu encouraged First Nations women to use their health care services.

Beaulieu spoke several languages, including Chipewyan, Cree, Michif and Slavey. She is believed to be the source of the Chipewyan oral history recorded by Fathers Émile Petitot and Grouard. She also helped to preserve oral tradition for her own people.

She was married twice: first to Joseph Bouvier in 1852 until his death in 1877, and then to Jean-Baptiste Lamoureux in 1879. She died at Fort Providence in 1918 after the death of her second husband earlier that year.

During the winter, she often travelled the 150 miles between Fort Providence and Fort Rae; she also carried mail between the two communities.

In 2012, she was declared a Person of National Historic Significance by the Canadian government, the first woman in the Northwest Territories to receive the designation.
