= Neekaneet =

Leader of the Nekaneet Cree Nation

Neekaneet (Foremost Man) (c. 1874 - 1897) was a Plains Cree chief, leader of the Nekaneet Cree Nation who settled in Cypress Hills in 1880. He was declared a National Historic Person on 13 November 1981.

Neekaneet died in Cypress Hills on 16 May 1897. His people were granted a reserve in 1913.
