= Enid Gordon Graham =

- Born: Enid Gordon Finley; 1894; Montreal, Quebec
- Died: 1974 (aged 79–80)

Enid Gordon Graham (née Finley 1894–1974) co-founded a physiotherapy diploma at the University of Toronto and worked for the Military School of Orthopaedic Surgery and Physiotherapy during the 1910s. Before starting the program, Graham worked at the Voluntary Aid Detachment during World War I. She also created courses for the McGill University Faculty of Education. Apart from education, Graham co-established the Canadian Association of Massage and Remedial Gymnastics in 1920. After the organization was renamed to the Canadian Physiotherapy Association, Graham became an honorary president for the CPA in 1961. In 2014, Graham was posthumously named a Person of National Historic Significance.

== Early life ==
In 1894, Graham was born Enid Gordon Finley in Montreal, Quebec. She completed her education in the United States and Europe.

== Career ==
Graham began her career in World War I when she worked alongside the Voluntary Aid Detachment as a physiotherapist for injured soldiers in Montreal. During the war, she created two courses at McGill University Faculty of Education and was asked to work in Toronto as a professor in 1917. While in Toronto, she worked at the Military School of Orthopaedic Surgery and Physiotherapy and co-created a diploma in physiotherapy at the University of Toronto with her second husband.

Outside of education, Graham co-founded the Canadian Association of Massage and Remedial Gymnastics in 1920, which was later renamed to the Canadian Physiotherapy Association. During World War II, she established a military committee for the CPA and was named an honorary president in 1961.

== Personal life and death ==
Graham was previously married with two children when her first husband died in 1922. She later married again in 1929 and had a child together before her death in 1974.

== Awards and honours ==
In 1979, Graham was posthumously honoured by the Canadian Physiotherapy Association with the creation of the Enid Graham Memorial Lecture. In 2014, Graham was named a Person of National Historic Significance of Canada. A memorial dedicated to her was unveiled at the University of Toronto's Hart House in 2017.
