= Nicolas Vincent =

Nicolas Vincent Tsawenhohi
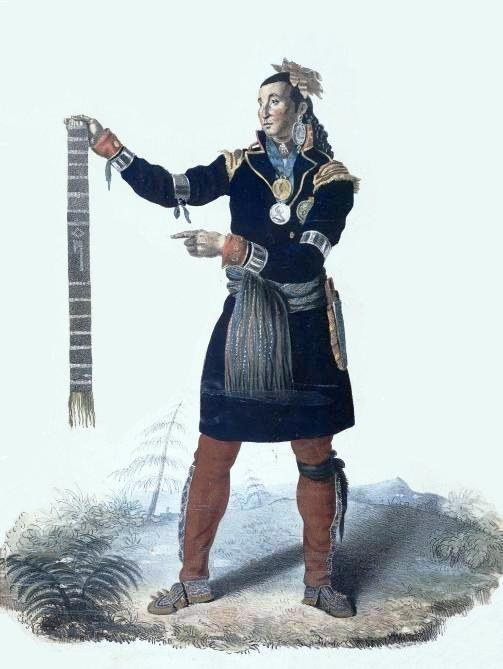
- Nicholas Vincent by Edward Chatfield, 1825
- Born: abt. 1769
- Died: 31 October 1844 (aged 75); Jeune-Lorette, Quebec
- Occupation: Grand Chief of the Hurons of Lorette
- Spouse(s): Véronique Petit-Étienne, Madeleine Thomas
- Parent(s): Louis Vincent Sawantanan, Louise Martin Thodatowan

Nicolas Vincent (abt. 1769 – 31 October 1844), known also as Tsaouenhohoui, meaning "one who plunges things into the water," or Tsa8enhohi, meaning "he who sees clearly," was the Grand Chief of the Wendat of Lorette from 1811 to 1844. He was the last Wendat chief to bear the name Tsaouenhohoui. In 2001, he was listed as a Person of National Historic Significance for having "elevated the position of Grand Chief to an unprecedented level of respectability".

Notes: He was not born on April 11, 1769, as several “sources” suggest, since the child born on that date, Ignace-Nicolas, died shortly after his birth, on December 20.

== Biography ==
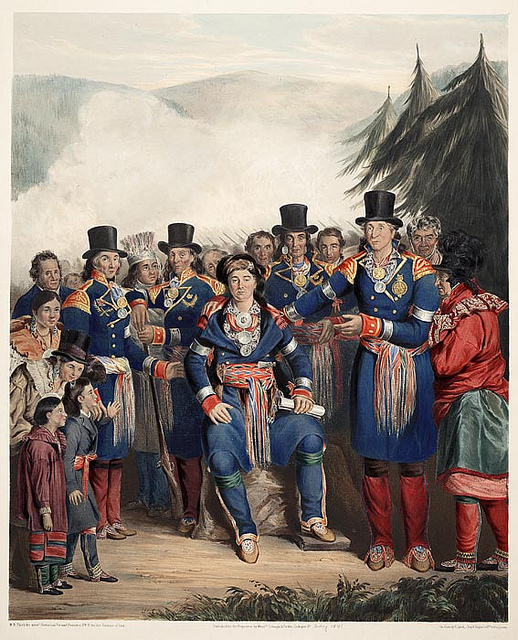
Presentation of a newly-elected Chief of the Huron Tribe, Canada by Henry Daniel Thielcke, 1841. Vincent is to right of the seated figure, Robert Symes, presenting him. Note that Vincent is wearing a medal which was given to him by King George IV.

Nicolas Vincent was born on 11 April 1769 to Louis Vincent (Sawantanan) and Louise Martin (Thodatowan). On 24 November 1794, he was married to Véronique Petit-Étienne, a Wendat, and they had nine children. On 22 January 1821, he was remarried to Madeleine, a Wolastoqew who was the widow of Pierre-Jacques Thomas of Penobscot.

In 1803, he was named War Chief. By 1810, he became Grand Chief. For the next three decades, he actively tried to reclaim and secure Wendat lands from colonizers and loggers operating within the borders of the Huron-Wendat. This effort that eventually took him to England in 1825, alongside the Council Chiefs, André Romain (Tsohahissen) and Stanislas Koska (Aharathanha), and the War Chief, Michel Tsiewei (Téhatsiendahé). They had several conversations with various members of Parliament including the colonial secretary, Lord Bathurst. On 8 April 1825, King George IV received the four Wendat chiefs. The London Times reported the exchange between the Wendat grand chief and the British sovereign, who had bestowed medals bearing his likeness to the four.

In French, Vincent addressed the sovereign:

"I was instructed not to speak in the royal presence unless in answer to your Majesty's questions; but my feelings overpower me; my heart is full; I am amazed at such unexpected grace and condescension, and cannot doubt that I shall be pardoned for expressing our gratitude. The sun is shedding its genial rays upon our heads. It reminds me of the Great Creator of the Universe—of him who can make alive and who can kill. Oh! may that gracious and beneficent Being, who promises to answer the fervent prayers of his people, bless abundantly your Majesty! May he grant you much bodily health; and, for the sake of your happy subjects, may he prolong your valuable life. It is not alone the four individuals who now stand before your Majesty who will retain to the end of their lives a sense of this kind and touching reception; the whole of the nation, whose representatives we are, will ever love and be devoted to you their good and great father."

After the speech, King George IV promised that he would take every occasion to enhance their well-being, ensure their happiness, and show himself to be truly a father. He then conversed with them in French for more than a quarter of an hour.

A few years later, Nicolas Vincent was the first Native to speak to the members of the Assembly of Lower Canada. In 1829, at the request of colonial authorities, he drew the map known as the 'Vincent Plan' which identified the hunting lands used by the Wendat.

He died on 31 October 1844 in Jeune-Lorette.

== Plaque ==
In 2005, a plaque was approved to be made at the site of his home, 186 Nicolas-Vincent Street, Wendake, Quebec, which reads:

Grand Chief of the Hurons of Lorette from 1811 to 1844, Nicolas Vincent Tsawenhohi was an astute politician and a skilful diplomat, renowned for his profound respect for and knowledge of Aboriginal laws, customs, and traditions. He formed alliances with colonial authorities and fought for his people's territorial rights by addressing the House of Assembly of Lower Canada, and by personally petitioning King George IV. Tsawenhohi, "he who sees clearly," was widely respected by his contemporaries and his achievements live on today in the collective memory of the Huron-Wendat.
