= Gustave Francq =

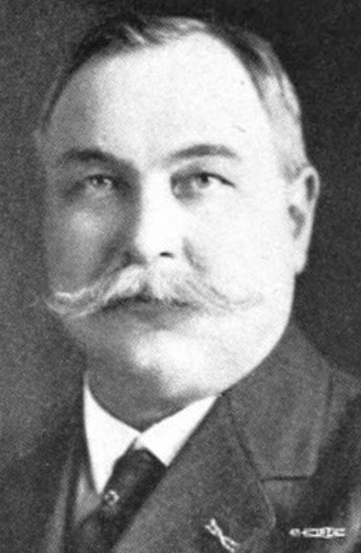
- Born: March 1871; Brussels, Belgium
- Died: January 2, 1952 (aged 80); Montreal, Quebec, Canada
- Occupation(s): Typographer, labour leader
- Spouse: Léda Fournier (m. 1891)

Gustave Francq (March 1871 – January 2, 1952) was a typographer, printer, trade unionist and journalist in Canada.

== Biography ==
Born in Brussels, Belgium, the son of Benoît Francq and Henriette-Julie-Marie-Anne Cruks, Francq arrived in Québec in 1886 and worked as an apprentice typographer. He lived for a time in Lowell, Massachusetts and in Brussels before settling in Montréal in 1900.

In 1902, Francq founded the Imprimerie Mercantile and was its director until 1949. In 1902, he became a member of l'Union typographique Jacques-Cartier.

He was the secretary of the Parti ouvrier (Labour Party) and, in the 1908 Quebec general election, he was candidate for this party in the district of Hochelaga.

In 1909, he became president of the Conseil des métiers et du travail de Montréal. From 1909 until 1911, he was vice-president of the Trades and Labour Congress of Canada.

In 1916, he founded the publication Le Monde ouvrier / The Labour World, which published articles about trade unionism and social issues and promoted reforms of the electoral system and the creation of programs of unemployment insurance, old age pensions and health insurance.

He was close to the progressive wing of the Liberal Party.

From 1925 until 1937, he was president of the Quebec Commission of minimum wage of women (Commission du salaire minimum des femmes du Québec). From 1939 until 1944, he was vice-president of the Commission of minimum wage (Commission du salaire minimum).

In 1937, he participated in the creation of the Fédération provinciale du travail du Québec.

He was a member of the masonic Lodge l'Émancipation from 1908 until 1910 and he founded the Lodge Force et courage.

== Personal life ==
He married Léda Fournier in 1891 in Québec.

== Honours ==
He was designated a Person of National Historic Significance by the government of Canada in 2008.

== Bibliography ==
- Geoffrey Ewen, The ideas of Gustave Francq as expressed in Le Monde ouvrier / The Labour World, MA thesis, University of Ottawa, 1981.
- André E. Leblanc, Gustave Francq : un pionnier du mouvement syndical au Québec, Fédération des travailleurs et travailleuses du Québec, Montréal, 1991.
- Éric Leroux, La carrière polyvalente de Gustave Francq, figure marquante du syndicalisme international au Québec (1871–1952), Ph.D. thesis, Université de Montréal, Montréal, 1999.
- Éric Leroux, Gustave Francq. Figure marquante du syndicalisme et précurseur de la FTQ, VLB Éditeur, 2001, 371 p.
- Selected texts of Gustave Franck, most of them originally published in Le Monde ouvrier, republished in Éric Leroux, La pensée de Gustave Francq, syndicaliste et réformateur social. Textes choisis, 1905-1948, collection « Études et documents », Regroupement des chercheurs en histoire des travailleurs québécois, 2001.
- Georges Massé, Gustave Francq, Fédération des travailleurs et travailleuses du Québec, 2002.
- Jacques Rouillard, Histoire du syndicalisme au Québec, Boréal, 1989.
