= Nellie Yip Quong =

Canadian midwife and activist (1882–1949)

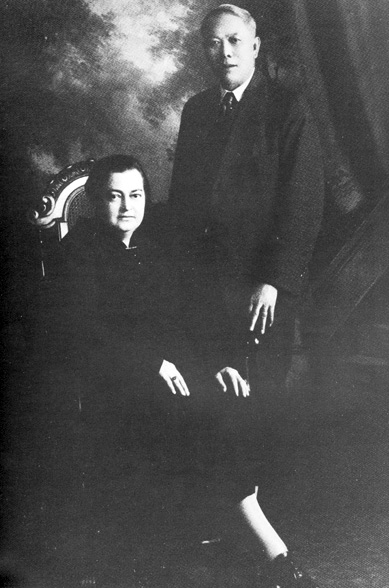
Nellie Yip Quong with her husband, Charlie

Nellie Yip Quong (née Nellie Tower; 1882–1949) was a Canadian midwife, feminist, and social activist. She and her husband Charlie Yip Quong were among the first mixed Chinese/European married couple in Vancouver. For over four decades, she worked tirelessly to improve the conditions of Chinese living in Canada. In 2008, she was designated a Person of National Historic Significance for being a "bold and outspoken advocate for her adopted community, she served as an intermediary between the Euro-Canadian and Chinese Canadian societies."

== Biography ==
Yip Quong was born in Saint John, New Brunswick née Nellie Tower. She went to the United States for private education. Afterwards, she worked as an English teacher in New York City. While teaching, she met Charlie Yip Quong, a Chinese jeweller from Vancouver.

On 28 August 1898, she married Charlie Yip Quong at Chelsea, Massachusetts, back when interracial marriages were rare. After some time in both New York City and Vancouver, the couple went to China. In 1904, they returned to Vancouver.

Nellie was accepted into Vancouver's Chinese community and was actively involved in the Ladies Empire Reform Association, the only non-Chinese woman, in this political organization. There is a 1904 photograph of the Ladies Chinese Reform Association in the City of Vancouver Archives, which includes her image.

In 1917, Charlie and Nellie moved to 783 East Pender Street where they raised their daughter Eleanor (Lum). There she provided health and social services in Chinese, that were not available in Vancouver due to racism. Among the services provided was midwifery, where she aided in the delivery of about 500 babies. She also arranged adoptions for single mothers.

Eventually, she was hired by the Chinese Benevolent Association of Vancouver as the first public health nurse for the Chinese population. She also acted as an interpreter in Vancouver and translated court cases. In addition, she "convinced the Vancouver General Hospital to end their policy of keeping all non-Caucasian patients in the basement."

== Designation ==
Yip Quong's designation was initiated by Dr. Imogene Lim, Professor, Anthropology, Vancouver Island University, a relative by marriage, and supported by Mrs. Yip Quong's daughter Eleanor Lum and her granddaughter Starlet Lum. Her plaque was unveiled, May 13, 2017, in a ceremony in Vancouver's Chinatown.

== Legacy ==
On May 25, 2013, the Nellie Yip House received a 'Places That Matter' plaque, written in English and Chinese, from the Vancouver Heritage Foundation. Nellie has also been honoured by the Vancouver Public Library; the nə́c̓aʔmat ct Strathcona Branch has named a community room after her.

== Trivia ==
- Yip Quong spoke Cantonese, four regional dialects and some Mandarin.
- Yip Quong was colour blind.
- Jimi Hendrix's grandparents, Ross and Nora Hendrix, lived in the same house in Vancouver as the Yip Quoungs. Subsequent to the Yip Quong's departure, the house had become a brothel.
