= Donald Strathearn Rawson =

Canadian limnologist (1905–1961)

Donald Strathearn Rawson (19 May 1905 – 16 February 1961) was a Canadian limnologist who worked with the University of Saskatchewan from 1928 to 1961. For his research, Rawson wrote six publications about twelve lakes he had researched in Saskatchewan. He additionally conducted lake investigations in Western Canada during the 1930s and the Northwest Territories in the 1940s. While with the university, Rawson was both in charge of their Fisheries Laboratory and head of biology from the late 1940s to early 1960s. In 1944, Rawson was a Fellow of the Royal Society of Canada. For Canada, Rawson was posthumously named a Person of National Historic Significance in 2019.

== Early life and education ==
On 19 May 1905, Rawson was born in Claremont, Ontario. For his post-secondary education, Rawson attended the University of Toronto in the 1920s for several degrees ranging from a Bachelor of Arts to a Doctor of Philosophy. During his time at Toronto during the mid to late 1920s, Rawson performed scientific demonstrations about biology. Rawson also received a bursary from the National Research Council Canada in 1927.

== Career ==
In 1928, Rawson began his academic career with the University of Saskatchewan as a biology professor. That year, Rawson started performing limnology research at Prince Albert National Park. With his Saskatchewan research, Rawson remained in Prince Albert until 1934. Between 1935 and 1960, Rawson wrote six publications about twelve Saskatchewan lakes he had studied. Some of these lakes he wrote about include Waskesiu Lake, Lake Athabaska and Cree Lake. By the early 1960s, he had released over sixty articles.

Outside of Saskatchewan, Rawson conducted investigations during the 1930s in Western Canada. These were at Paul Lake, Okanagan Lake and Riding Mountain National Park. In 1944, Rawson and his colleagues went to Great Slave Lake in the Northwest Territories to begin a three-year study on ostracodes.

While working for the University of Saskatchewan until 1961, Rawson became in charge of the Fisheries Laboratory in 1948 and head of biology the following year. He continued to hold both positions until ending his tenure at the Fisheries Laboratory in 1960. As an executive, Rawson was named the president of the Limnological Society of America in 1947. In 1958, he co-established the Canadian Society of Wildlife and Fishery Biologists.

== Awards and honours ==
In 1944, Rawson became a Fellow of the Royal Society of Canada. Rawson was posthumously named one of the Persons of National Historic Significance for Canada in 2019.

== Death and personal life ==
On 16 February 1961, Rawson died in Saskatoon, Saskatchewan. He was married and had three children.
