= Maria Adams =

Maria Adams may refer to:

- Maria Hoadley Adams, wife of John Adams who owns John and Maria Adams House
- Maria Adams, a woman kidnapped and sold into slavery by John Crenshaw

== See also ==
- Marie Adams (disambiguation)
- Mary Adams (disambiguation)
