= Agathe de Saint-Père =

Agathe de Saint-Père (1657–1748) was a French-Canadian business entrepreneur and inventor.

== Background ==
Agathe Legardeur or more commonly known as Agathe de Saint-Père was born on February 27, 1657, in New France or what is now Montreal. Growing up with ten siblings she attended Marguerite Bourgeoys's school along with her step sister. And in 1672 her mother's death followed at the age of 15 leaving her and her family of ten. Agathe de Saint-Père would go on to marry a French Military officer, by the name of Pierre Le Gardeur de Repentigny, eventually giving birth to eight children of her own. And then following her eventual death in 1748.

== Career ==
She married Pierre Legardeur de Repentigny in 1685 and resided in Montreal. As a married woman, she was legally a minor under the guardianship of her spouse, but as her husband signed a power of attorney for her giving her permission to conduct business, she became a major figure in Canadian business life. She engaged in the fur trade, agriculture and textile industry. She also developed a new form of textile, which she presented to the king, was given a patent for, and had manufactured and sold.

== Awards and honours ==
In 2016, de Saint-Père was named a Person of National Historic Significance. She was cited as "representative of the significant economic role played by women of New France".
