= Mona Gordon Wilson =

Canadian public health nurse

Mona Gordon Wilson, OBE (1894–1981) was a public health nurse on Prince Edward Island, Canada.

== Nursing career ==
The daughter of Harold Wilson and Elizabeth Farquahar Tainsh, she was born in Toronto and was educated at the Johns Hopkins School of Nursing. She served in the American Army Nursing Corps during World War I. After the war, she served with the American Red Cross in eastern Europe. She returned to Canada, earned a degree in public health nursing from the University of Toronto and became chief Red Cross public health nurse for Prince Edward Island, serving from 1922 to 1931. Wilson introduced public health initiatives such as nursing classes, school programs, health clinics, home visits and Junior Red Cross branches to the island. In 1931, when the province established a Department of Health, she was named Provincial Director of Public Health Nursing. From 1940 to 1946, she was assistant commissioner of the British Red Cross for Newfoundland. She also helped establish a number of organizations on Prince Edward Island, including the Girl Guides, the Zonta Club and the Business and Professional Women's Club of Charlottetown.

Wilson was awarded the Florence Nightingale Medal and, in 1946, was appointed an Officer of the Order of the British Empire.

== Later life and legacy ==
Wilson retired from nursing in 1961, and died in 1981. A biography, entitled She Answered Every Call, was published by Doug Baldwin in 1997. In 2010, Wilson was named a Person of National Historic Significance by the Canadian government.
