= Ulmus pumila 'Manchu' =

Elm cultivar

- Species: Ulmus pumila
- Cultivar: 'Manchu'
- Origin: Saskatchewan, Canada

The Siberian Elm cultivar Ulmus pumila 'Manchu' was raised by Stewarts Nurseries, Sutherland, Saskatchewan, c. 1951 from seed collected by Mr Ptitsin from near Harbin, China, an area which has a similar climate to that of the Great Plains. Green reported (1964) a suggestion to merge 'Manchu' and the Siberian elm cultivar 'Harbin' with 'Dropmore', as all came from the same area.

== Description ==
Not available.

== Pests and diseases ==
See under Ulmus pumila.

== Cultivation ==
'Manchu' was found to be hardy in Saskatchewan. The tree was superseded in the United States by 'Dropmore'. Current cultivation status is unknown.
