= François-Xavier Picard Tahourenché =

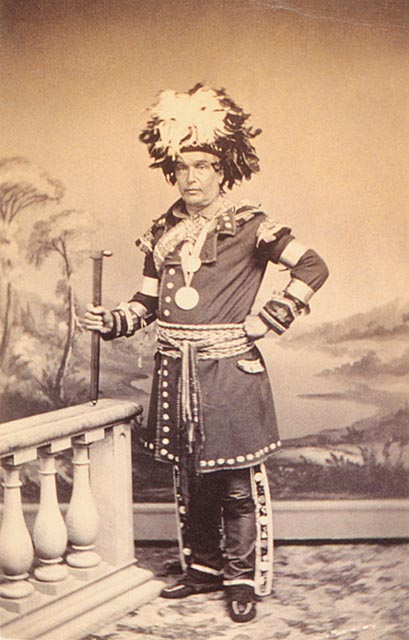
Paul Tahourenché (François Xavier Picard), Great Chief of the Lorette Hurons, 1863

François-Xavier Picard Tahourenché (1810–1883) was a Great Chief of the Lorette Hurons from 1870 to 1883 and an archivist who was designated a Person of National Historic Significance by the Canadian Government in 2008. He "shaped the history of his nation by keeping archives and heritage objects that reflect the life, history and values of the Huron-Wendat people." He was born to Marguerite Vincent Lawinonkié and Paul Picard Hondawonhont in Wendake, Quebec.
