= Savalette =

Basque ship captain who fished in Canada

Captain Savalette was a Basque ship's captain who, in 1607, reportedly had been fishing off Canso, Nova Scotia since 1565.

Based in Saint-Jean-de-Luz, Savalette had learned of these fishing spots from his father, who had in turn heard of them from his father. When Savalette met Samuel de Champlain in 1607, he stated that he had crossed the Atlantic Ocean to this location every year for the past forty two years. Captain Savalette also encountered the French explorer Marc Lescarbot.

Savalette engaged in the so-called "dry" or sedentary fishery. Fish were caught close to shore and were dried on shore soon after being caught.

A plaque was erected on the shore at Tor Bay, commemorating Captain Savalette's voyages to this area. Tor Bay was previously known as Port Savalette. The Festival Savalette is held in the area each August.

Captain Savalette was named a Person of National Historic Significance by the Canadian government in 1944.
