= Marie Marguerite Rose =

Canadian entrepreneur and enslaved person

Marie Marguerite Rose (c. 1717–1757) was a Guinean-born Canadian slave. In 2008, Rose was made a Person of National Historic Significance by the Government of Canada.

== Biography ==
In 1736, Jean Chrysostome Loppinot, a French naval officer posted in Louisbourg, on Île Royale, modern-day Cape Breton, purchased Rose at an unknown price. She was then baptized in September, given a French name and possibly branded. The certificate of her baptism places her at approximately nineteen years old.

For nineteen years she performed domestic duties; cooking meals, washing clothes and scrubbing floors in the Loppinot household, which included up to 12 children. During this time, she became pregnant to an unknown father, later giving birth to a son, Jean-Francois. Jean-Francois became a de facto slave until his death at the age of thirteen.

Shortly after the fall of Louisbourg in 1745, she and her son, along with the Loppinot family, moved to Rochefort, despite the illegality of slavery in France. In 1749, they returned to Louisbourg, where her son died.

She was manumitted in 1755. Around 1755, she married Jean Pierre Laurent, a Mi'kmaw man, described in contemporary accounts as an "Indian". In 1756, she and her husband rented a house from Bernard Parris, a navy captain.

The couple began a tavern in Louisbourg, at the corner of Saint-Louis Street and Place d'Armes, near the barracks. Elgersman, relying on invoices that survive, notes that their tavern must have had a "diverse clientele".

In 1757, her second year of freedom, she died. She was buried at the Fortress of Louisbourg. At her death an inventory was taken. "She had an extensive collection of used clothing and a pair of half-made woollen stockings. Her other possessions were balls of handmade soap, an iron, supplies for dyeing clothes, six pounds of sugar and a cookbook," despite her inability to read.

== Legacy ==
In April 2008, Rose was made a Person of National Historic Significance by the government of Canada.

In 2009, Parks Canada began a Slavery Tour at the Louisbourg fortress. Rose's life is highlighted during the tour.

On August 6, 2010, Cathy McLeod, Member of Parliament for Kamloops-Thompson-Cariboo, on behalf of Jim Prentice, Minister of the Environment and Minister responsible for Parks Canada, commemorated a plaque in Rose's honour.

On July 16, 2011, Peter Kent, Canada's Environment Minister and Minister responsible for Parks Canada, unveiled an exhibit celebrating Marie Marguerite Rose. During the presentation he gave an address:

This exhibit represents the immense perseverance of Marie Marguerite Rose, a woman who with courage and dignity asserted her rights at a time when they were far from assured. Her life serves as a reminder of both our nation’s diverse heritage and the freedoms we as Canadians enjoy today.

== Sources ==
- Elgersman, Maureen Lee (1999). Unyielding Spirits: Black Women and Slavery in Early Canada and Jamaica. Garland Publishing. ISBN 0-8153-3229-7. OCLC 40668184.
