= William Donald Albright =

Canadian agriculturalist and journalist

- Born: August 5, 1881; South Cayuga, Ontario, Canada
- Died: April 29, 1946 (aged 64); Haney, British Columbia, Canada
- Education: Ontario Agricultural College
- Occupations: agriculturalist, journalist

William Donald Albright (August 5, 1881 – April 29, 1946) was a Canadian agriculturalist and journalist. In 1954, Albright was named a Person of National Historic Significance by the Canadian government.

== Biography ==
William Donald Albright was born on August 5, 1881, at South Cayuga, Ontario. In 1903, Albright graduated from the Ontario Agricultural College. That same year he became the assistant editor of The Maritime Farmer, a farming periodical based in New Brunswick. Leaving the Farmer in 1905, Albright subsequently became employed as an associate editor at the Farmer's Advocate, another agricultural publication. In 1908 he married Eva Belle Lossing, from Oxford County, Ontario.

In 1913, Albright and his wife left Ontario to homestead in the Peace River area of northwestern Alberta, near the town of Beaverlodge, in the vicinity of Grande Prairie. Albright quickly became impressed with the agricultural potential of the region, and soon had agricultural experiments set up on his own land, with a contract to work part-time for the Central Experimental Farm in Ottawa, Ontario. In 1917, the government rented 20 acres (8.1 ha) of his land to establish an official experimental substation and paid him to operate it on a part-time basis. He became superintendent of the substation in 1919. By 1940 his entire farm was designated an experimental substation. In 1941, his Beaverlodge experiment substation was redesignated a full-scale experiment station, the northernmost of its type in Canada, and Albright became its director. He was to hold that position until 1945.

Albright's professional activities as an agricultural researcher included testing what could potentially be lucrative cereal crops as well as new farming practices. Albright was also entrusted with the promotion of animal husbandry and the planting of ornamental plants in the Alberta farming community, and spent much time travelling throughout the region promoting the idea that it was possible to maintain a good standard of living in the lowlands of the Peace River region. He and his wife, who were the parents of three children, also collected material on the region's history by conducting and compiling interviews.

Albright died on April 29, 1946, at Haney, British Columbia. In 1954, he was named a Person of National Historic Significance by the Canadian government.
