= Lucille Clifton ('Wii Nii Puun) =

Lucille Clifton ('Wii Nii Puun) (Note: Also known by other names including Mooxs, Wii Niisrl Puunk, Lucille Buxton, and the honorific title No'os.) (1876–1962) was a leader of the Gitga'ata people, specifically the Laxsgiik (Eagle Clan). She was designated a National Historic Person by the government of Canada on 4 July 2016.

Clifton took on a leadership role in the Hartley Bay community in approximately 1890. Her principal responsibilities in this position included overseeing the territory of the Hartley Bay Laxsgiik clan, providing for members of the clan, and representing the Laxsgiik of Hartley Bay at ceremonies and social functions. In addition to fulfilling these responsibilities, Clifton also took an active role in the preservation and transmission of traditional knowledge. She was especially noted for her extensive knowledge of local plants and their applications for culinary, medical, and manufacturing purposes.
