= Philip Westphal =

Royal Navy Admiral (1782–1880)

Philip Westphal (1782–16 March 1880) was an admiral in the Royal Navy. He was designated a Person of National Historic Significance for Canada in 1945.

== Biography ==
Philip Westphal was born in 1782, the son of George Westphal and younger brother of Admiral George Augustus Westphal. He entered the North American station of the Royal Navy in 1794. Two years later he served in the Home Squadron on HMS Albatross (1795) and HMS Shannon (1796) before being transferred to HMS Asia (1764) in 1797. Westphal served in North America on the Asia for three years, until 1800. He served under Horatio Nelson on HMS Blanche (1800) and participated in the Battle of Copenhagen in April 1801. On 5 April Westphal was promoted to lieutenant of HMS Defiance (1783) and in May of the following year he switched to HMS Amazon (1799), traveling from Toulon to the West Indies.

In 1806 his ship captured the French schooner Belle Poule and Westphal refitted the ship and captained it back to England in an unofficial capacity. When he returned, the British Admiralty declined to make his rank official and he remained a lieutenant. He left the Amazon in 1812 for HMS Junon (1810), serving off the coast of North America for three years. George Cockburn placed Westphal in service on Cockburn's flagship in January 1815 and he was promoted to commander on 23 June. Westphal moved to HMS Warspite (1807) in November 1828 and later to HMS Kent (1798). He reached a 'post rank' on 22 July 1830 and retired in 1847. While on the retired list, he was promoted to rear admiral (27 September 1855), vice-admiral (4 October 1862), and admiral (2 April 1866). He died on 16 March 1880. When he died, Westphal was the oldest officer in the Royal Navy.
