= Ethel Johns =

Canadian nurse and educator

Ethel Johns (May 13, 1879 – September 2, 1968) was a Canadian nurse, educator and administrator.

The daughter of Welsh parents, she was born in England and came to Ontario, Canada in 1888 with her father, a missionary. She studied nursing at the Winnipeg General Hospital Training School, graduating in 1902. Johns practised as a nurse in Winnipeg. She attended the teachers college at Columbia University and then returned to Winnipeg, where she worked as a superintendent at the Winnipeg Children's Hospital.

In 1919, she moved to British Columbia, where she was director of nursing services and education at the Vancouver General Hospital and coordinator for the newly established nursing program at the University of British Columbia. She established the first university degree program in nursing in Canada. From 1925 to 1929, she worked as an advisor for the creation of nursing schools in eastern Europe. From 1933 to 1944, she was editor for The Canadian Nurse.

While working for the Rockefeller Foundation, in 1925, Johns produced a report that recommended increased opportunities for education and employment for African-American nurses.

Johns retired in 1944. She died in Vancouver in 1968.

In 2009, she was named a Person of National Historic Significance. Johns is credited with advancing the recognition of nursing as a profession and working for equality for women in education and in employment.

The Ethel Johns Award is awarded annually by the Canadian Association of Schools of Nursing for distinguished service to nursing education in Canada.
