= Ernest Melville DuPorte =

- Born: October 24, 1891; Nevis, British West Indies
- Died: July 31, 1981 (aged 89); Montreal, Quebec, Canada
- Resting place: Mount Royal Cemetery
- Education: Macdonald College (McGill University)
- Known for: Insect morphology
- Spouse: Peggy DuPorte
- Scientific career
- Fields: Entomology
- Workplaces: McGill University
- Thesis: The muscular system of gryllus assimilis fabr. (Pennsylvanicus Burm.) (1920)

Ernest Melville DuPorte (24 October 1891 – 31 July 1981) was a Canadian entomologist best known for his research in insect morphology. He has been described as "a father of confederation for entomology" by Robin Stewart.

== Early life ==
DuPorte was born in 1891 in Nevis, one of the Leeward Islands in the Caribbean that was then part of the British West Indies. He began his education at the Charlestown Boys Primary School in Charlestown, where he excelled and drew the attention of H.C. Huggins, who awarded him a scholarship for secondary school studies at St. Kitts-Nevis Grammar School in Basseterre.

In 1910, he was awarded a scholarship from the St. Kitts-Nevis Legislative Council, which he used to attend Macdonald College in Montreal, Quebec, Canada. He began his studies in zoology there in October 1910, completing his Bachelor of Science in Agriculture (BSA) in three years.

He became the first zoology graduate to earn a Master of Science (M.Sc.), which he completed in 1914, and a PhD, which he completed in 1921, from McGill University. His thesis was "a pioneering work on orthoptera".

== Teaching and research ==
He began teaching at McGill in 1913, the first Black Canadian to do so, teaching entomology, genetics, parasitology, and other courses. He influenced the curriculum taught at the college, which became renowned for entomological study. He was renowned at the school for the class known as Zoology 220, for which he maintained high standards, and which many students had to repeat, including future McGill University professors. In 1924, he became one of thirteen members of the newly established Sigma chapter of the Omega Psi Phi fraternity. It was the fraternity's first chapter in Canada. It became inactive, and was later moved to Michigan State University in East Lansing, Michigan.

In 1934, he began research on ticks as disease vectors, and eventually requested government funding that was used to establish the Institute of Parasitology at the college, increasing Canada's prominence in parasitology research. DuPorte had previously drawn attention to the issue of animal parasites in agriculture.

He became head of the Entomology Department in 1955 after functionally leading it for decades, a position he maintained until his retirement in 1957. By that time, he had taught more than half of Canada's practicing entomologists. He was offered funding collected from 137 of his former students so he could travel with his wife across Canada; during the trip, he visited laboratories of his former students.

In 1959, Reinhold Publishing Corporation published the first edition of his book Manual of Insect Morphology. A classic text in the field, it ultimately had fifteen printings of five editions published.

== Legacy and awards ==
DuPorte became a Fellow of the Entomological Society of Canada in 1977. In 1963, he was awarded an honorary Doctorate of Science by Carleton University. In 2010, he was registered in the Persons of National Historic Significance, a register of people designated by the Government of Canada as being nationally significant in the history of the country.

The E. Melville DuPorte Award was established at McGill University from an endowment, and awarded since at least 1986. It is a $500 scholarship awarded to a student having completed the first year of graduate studies in entomology at the Department of Natural Resource Sciences, based on departmental recommendation to the scholarship committee of the Faculty of Agricultural and Environmental Sciences.

In 1980, the Société d'entomologie du Québec established a bursary that it awards to one of its student members registered at a university for full-time study. It is based on a scientific presentation of the student's research at the annual meeting of the society. Since 2010, two additional prizes have been awarded for best oral presentation.

An annual memorial lecture, the Dr. E. Melville DuPorte Lecture, is presented by the Department of Entomology with support from the Dean of Agriculture. A plaque in DuPorte's honour is located in the Lyman section of the McGill University Library at the Macdonald Campus.

== Works ==
- Manual of insect morphology. Reinhold Books in the Biological Sciences. 1959.
- Insect Morphology. Reinhold Books in the Biological Sciences. 1964.
- The Muscular System of Gryllus Assimilis. McGill University. 1920.
- Notes on the endophytic protozoa. McGill University. 1925.
- Francis Charles Harrison, 1871-1952. Royal Society of Canada. 1953.
