= Marguerite Vincent Lawinonkié =

Canadian artist (1783–1865)

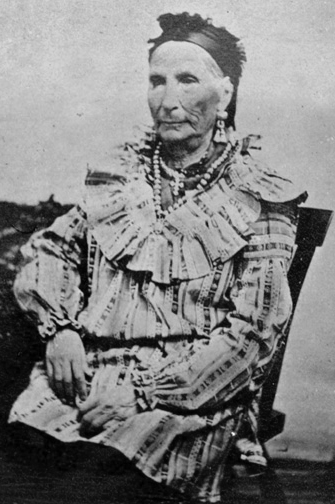
- Photograph of Marguerite Vincent Lawinonkié
- Born: c. 1783; Bay of Quinte
- Died: 1865
- Occupation: Artisan
- Spouse: Paul Picard Hondawonhont
- Children: Francois-Xavier Picard Tahourenche

Marguerite Vincent Lawinonkié (c. 1783–1865) was a famous Huron-Wendat craftswoman who helped save the Huron-Wendat community. In 2008, the Canadian government deemed her a 'Person of National Historic Significance' for the quality of her art. Her son was Francois-Xavier Picard Tahourenche.

== Biography ==
Lawinonkié was born in about 1783 to a Mohawk community on the Bay of Quinte. When she was twenty-four years old, she married Paul Picard Hondawonhont in Jeune-Lorette. Together they would have several children, but the only one to survive infancy was Francois-Xavier Picard Tahourenche. She supported the family through her artisan needlework, mainly creating snowshoes and moccasins embroidered with porcupine quills and moosehair. These works would become renowned in Quebec and Britain.

Her great success developed the local economy around moccasins and snowshoe production. By 1879, sixty of the seventy-six families in Lorette were employed in needlework, producing over 30,000 moccasins annually. The Wendake community became established for their numerous handcrafted products while preserving their traditional techniques and knowledge.

She died in 1865 and was buried in the chapel at the Jeune-Lorette Mission.

== Notability ==
Several of her finest works, such as the headdress she made for her son, who became Grand Chief of the Huron-Wendat, are preserved in museums. On April 25, 2008, the Canadian Museum of Civilization acquired several possessions of James Bruce, 8th Earl of Elgin, among them were his snowshoes, two pairs of beaded moccasins and two birchbark trays attributed to Lawinonkié. Her former home has been preserved and converted into an interpretive and cultural centre.

In 2008, the Canadian government deemed Lawinokié a person of National Historic Significance for "[Bringing] to light the quality of the work and creativity of the artisans of Lorette and today is among the rare known artisans associated with this quality production." In 2022, she was declared a historic personage in Quebec.

== See also ==
- Persons of National Historic Significance
