= Ulmus pumila 'Dropmore' =

Elm cultivar

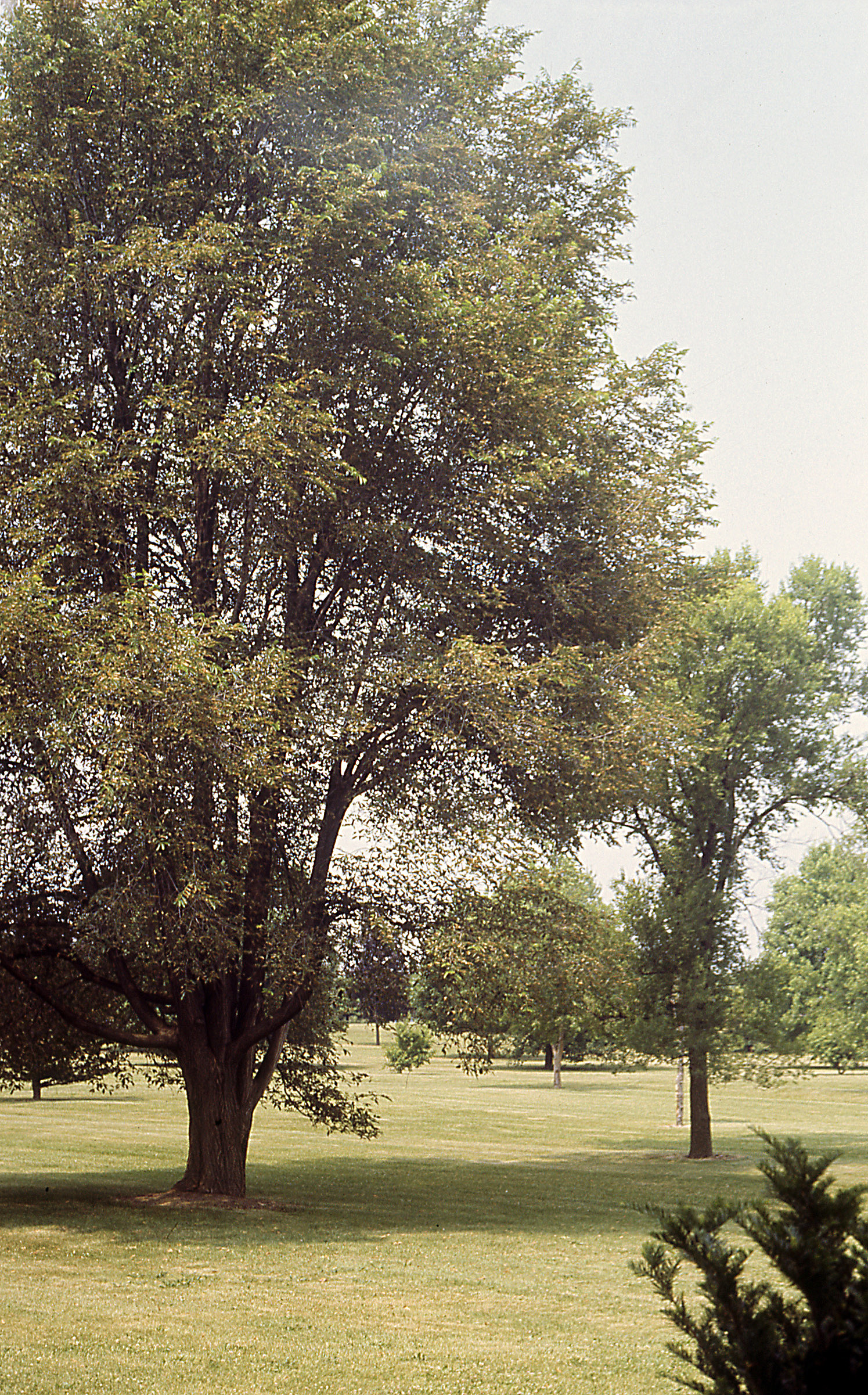
- Ulmus pumila 'Dropmore' (right), Ulmus 'Fremont' (U. pumila x U. rubra) (left), 1987, Madison Arboretum, University of Wisconsin
- Species: Ulmus pumila
- Cultivar: 'Dropmore'
- Origin: US

The Siberian elm cultivar Ulmus pumila 'Dropmore' was grown from seed collected in Harbin, Manchuria, China, by F. L. Skinner, of Dropmore, Manitoba. Green reported (1964) a suggestion to merge the Siberian elm cultivars 'Harbin' and 'Manchu' with 'Dropmore', as all came from the Harbin area. In the event, 'Dropmore' appears to have superseded these earlier cultivars.

The cultivar 'Chinkota' was raised in North Dakota from 'Dropmore' seed.

== Description ==
'Dropmore' is a fast-growing bushy form producing small leaves.

== Pests and diseases ==
See under Ulmus pumila.

== Cultivation ==
The tree remains in commercial cultivation in the United States. Considered cold-hardy far into Canada , it did not perform well in the hot, arid, climate of Arizona as part of the elm trials in conducted by the Northern Arizona University at Holbrook.

No specimens of 'Dropmore' are known to survive in the UK. In 2022 and 2025 Brighton and Hove Council listed by this name, without provenance or identification information, a vase-shaped elm in Tenantry Down Road, with fewer leaf-vein pairs than 'Dropmore' and without the tiny marginal serrations and neat tapering leaf-tip of 'Dropmore'. (Note: Leaves of Tenantry Down Road elm ; Tenantry Down Road elm)

== Accessions ==
North America

- Dominion Arboretum, Ottawa, Ontario, Canada. No acc. details.
- Morton Arboretum, US. Acc. no. 883–85; tree from Inter-State Nursery, Hamburg, Iowa.

== Nurseries ==
North America

- Lee Nursery Inc. , Fertile, Minnesota, US.
- Lincoln Oakes, Bismarck, North Dakota, US.
