= William Henry Chase (Canadian entrepreneur) =

William Henry Chase (c. 1851 – November 1933) was an entrepreneur and philanthropist in Nova Scotia, Canada. He was known as "the apple king of Nova Scotia".

The son of Albert Chase and Rebecca Kinsman, he was born in Port Williams. He began work at his father's general store there and began shipping potatoes to the West Indies at the age of eighteen. Chase developed the apple industry in the Annapolis Valley, becoming the largest apple producer in Nova Scotia, the largest producer of barrelled apples in the world and a millionaire.

Chase served on the town council for Wolfville and was president of the local board of trade.

In 1890, Chase married Frances Webster; the couple had two children who both became doctors.

He helped fund:

- Eastern Kings Memorial Hospital
- the Public Archives of Nova Scotia building, now the Chase building at Dalhousie University
- Acadia University

Chase died in Wolfville at the age of 81. His former home, Chase House, has been designated as a historic property, and he has been designated as a Person of National Historic Significance by the Government of Canada.
