= Mary Adams (educator) =

Canadian women's education reformer

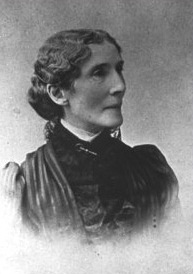
- Born: November 10, 1823; Westbury, Quebec
- Died: November 5, 1898 (aged 74); Toronto, Ontario, Canada
- Occupations: Educator, women's education reformer
- Known for: Leadership in female academic institutions
- Honours: Person of National Historic Significance (Canada 2004)

Mary Electa Adams (November 10, 1823 – November 5, 1898) was a Canadian women's education reformer. Adams was an advocate for higher standards in women's education and helped shape models for female academic instruction in Canada. In 2004, the Canadian government designated her a Person of National Historic Significance.

== Early life and education ==
Mary Electa Adams was born in Westbury, Lower Canada on November 10, 1823 to Rufus Adams and Maria Hubbard. When the young Mary was two years old, her family moved to Acton, Upper Canada. Until 1840, Adams's parents educated her. In that year, Adams moved to Montpelier, Vermont to commence her formal education—but transferred to the Cobourg Ladies' Seminary in Upper Canada the following year, where she earned her diploma of mistress of liberal arts. She stayed there as a teacher until 1847—then moved to Toronto when the school moved there, renamed the Adelaide Academy.

== Career ==
In 1848, Adams left to take up the position of lady principal at Picton Academy. In 1850, she left that position because of ill health, and moved to the Albion Seminary in Michigan to become a teacher and school administrator. In 1854, she moved to Sackville, New Brunswick to take up the position of chief preceptress, the highest administrative role available to a woman in her school. Although not named as such, Adams was effectively the principal of the 'female branch' of the Mount Allison Wesleyan Academy. Adams believed that women needed and deserved a rigorous academic program, and at the Mount Allison Wesleyan Academy she put these principles into practice.

When Adams's father died in May 1856, she considered resigning as chief preceptress, but her belief in "the cause of female education" kept her there until 1857, when she returned home. Her eldest sister died in 1858. In 1861, Adams returned to school administration, becoming the founding principal of the Wesleyan Female College in Hamilton, Ontario. The school faced financial problems in its early years, and she was forced to teach in a poorly-converted hotel building—but Adams successfully transformed the college into a well-regarded academic institution. A newspaper reported that she was "the life of the institution" in June 1863.

In 1868, Adams's mother died, and she left the Wesleyan Female College to travel in Italy with her sister and coworker, Augusta. On her return home, she settled in Cobourg, Ontario, opening the Brookhurst Academy in 1872. Adams's intention when founding the college was to enroll only university-bound students, to keep the school exclusively for students in the elite academic class. Many Brookhurst students took classes at the nearby Victoria College. In 1877, the two schools jointly awarded the first diploma of mistress of English literature. In 1880, financial problems forced Brookhurst Academy to close.

Following her time at Brookhurst, Adams moved to Ontario Ladies' College to become its lady principal. However, she didn't like working at a school she regarded as Brookhurst's major competitor, and had conflicts with her superior. In 1892, at nearly 70 years of age, Adams retired from teaching, and spent her remaining years establishing cattle ranches in Morley, Alberta with her sister Augusta and nephew Lucius. On November 5, 1898, Adams died while visiting relatives in Toronto.

== Legacy ==
Adams's work furthered the cause of women's education in British North America and, although she did not have students graduating with full bachelor's degrees while lady principal at her various places of employment, her teaching methods were modelled by others and have had a profound impact on gender equality in education. In 2004, Adams was designated a Person of National Historic Significance.
