= Mary Adams (purported virgin) =

English fictional character

- First appearance: The Ranters Monster (March 1652)
- Created by: George Horton
- Based on: Mary, Mother of Jesus

In-universe information
- Species: Human

Mary Adams (alleged death 1652) is a fictional character created for the purpose of the pamphlet The Ranters Monster by George Horton, printed in London in March 1652. She is depicted as a self-proclaimed virgin mother who claimed to have been impregnated by the Holy Ghost.

The pamphlet is a cautionary tale about supposed blasphemy and teratogenesis, the non-heritable birth defects on an embryo or fetus which result in the birth of an abnormal Greek τέρας teras (monster). It is a direct, contemporary criticism of the Ranters. Adams expects to give birth to the Saviour of the World, but she is imprisoned and then has a prolonged and difficult labour. Instead of giving birth to a saviour, her child is a stillborn deformed creature. Following this disappointment, Adams commits suicide by performing her own disembowelment with a knife. Her death is superficially similar to a seppuku-style suicide, performed by plunging a short blade into the belly and drawing the blade from left to right, slicing the belly open. If the cut is deep enough, it can sever the abdominal aorta, causing death by rapid exsanguination.

== Plot ==
She denied the teachings of the Christian gospel, and declared that she was to bring forth the Saviour of the World. The pamphlet describes her alleged blasphemies, subsequent imprisonment, a prolonged labour resulting in the birth of a stillborn, deformed creature, and her eventual demise, which involved suicide by ripping open her bowels with a knife. However, there is no historical evidence to support the existence of Mary Adams; she exists solely within the context of this pamphlet, likely intended to serve as a cautionary tale or to sensationalise religious themes of the time.
