= Louis Thomas (Maliseet) =

Louis Thomas (also Louis Thomas-Saint-Aubin and Louis Saint-Aubin; c. 1766–c. 1869) was a chief of the North American First Nations people known as Wolastoqiyik (Maliseet). He was designated a Persons of National Historic Significance by the Canadian Government in 2002 in recognition of his efforts as a "defender of Maliseet interests and rights".
