= Frank Leith Skinner =

Frank Leith Skinner MBE
- Born: 1882; Rosehearty, Aberdeenshire, Scotland
- Died: August 27, 1967 (aged 84–85)
- Occupations: Plant breeder; horticulturist

Frank Leith Skinner M.B.E., L.L.D. (1882 - August 27, 1967) was a Canadian plant breeder and horticulturist.

== Life ==
Born in 1882 at Rosehearty, Pitsligo, Aberdeenshire, Scotland, he immigrated at a young age (1895) to the Dropmore region, Manitoba, Canada. Medical problems (the loss of a lung due to pneumonia) caused him to turn to gardening rather than agriculture. He established a nursery at Dropmore, Manitoba. In 1947 the University of Manitoba awarded him an honorary Doctorate of Laws. The Skinner Memorial Library at the University of Manitoba is named in his honour. Interviewed in 1965: "John Birnie, my half-brother, came to Canada early in 1882 ... In 1889 my sister Cristian came out to keep house for him and in 1893 they sent for Mary and Alex. In 1895 my father and mother, with the rest of the family were brought out and settled down to the business of cattle raising. As most of the farmers of the district were bachelors at the time, it was not long before we were related by marriage to most of the families in the district. ... In 1907 we moved to a frame house on my father’s homestead. It became customary for the family to gather there for Christmas and as many as 48 people have spent Christmas there. ... The old house now stands silent and empty and many of the younger generation have left the district. Time has taken its toll of the Skinners and only Clem [his sister, Clementina Lewis] and I remain." The nursery closed some years ago but there remains a Frank Skinner Arboretum and Arboretum Trail.

== Plant breeding ==
Frank Skinner began plant breeding on the family homestead in Manitoba, which became an experimental station and repository of his stock material. Notable introductions by Skinner include

- Rosa 'Isabella Skinner' (rose)
- Ulmus pumila 'Dropmore'
- Lonicera 'Dropmore Scarlet' (honeysuckle)
- Malus 'Rudolph' (flowering crab)
- Pyrus 'Dropmore' (pear)
- Anchusa 'Dropmore Blue' (Bugloss)
- Syringa 'Hiawatha' (lilac)
- Clematis 'Rosy O'Grady'
