= HMS Chesapeake =

Two ships of the Royal Navy have borne the name HMS Chesapeake

- HMS Chesapeake (1799) was a 38-gun American heavy frigate captured by HMS Shannon on 1 June 1813 in a 15-minute battle. Broken up in 1819
- HMS Chesapeake (1855) was a 51-gun screw-propelled frigate launched in 1855 and broken up in 1867
