= Sheridan Lawrence =

Sheridan Lawrence (April 8, 1870 – February 1, 1952) was a pioneer, farmer, rancher and judge in northern Alberta.

The son of Henry and Margaret Lawrence, he was born in South Stukely, Quebec and came to the Fort Vermilion area in 1886 with his parents. On their large farm, the family raised cattle, hogs and horses. Lawrence married Julia "Juey" Scott in 1900. In 1901, his parents turned over the farm to Sheridan. He operated a flour mill, a dairy, a sawmill and a slaughterhouse, and grew wheat. Besides farming and ranching, Lawrence ran a number of trading posts.

The success of this large farming operation so far north helped convince the federal government to establish the Fort Vermilion Agricultural Experimental Station, which was opened by Lawrence's cousin, Fred Lawrence, in 1907.

In 1936, Lawrence, his wife and the younger members of the family moved to Peace River and two years later he went into semi-retirement.

Lawrence died in Peace River at the age of 81.

In September 1952, a cairn was raised in his honour on the grounds of St. James Cathedral in Peace River.
