= Archibald Fraser (industrialist) =

- Born: April 22, 1869; Aberdeen, Scotland
- Died: October 10, 1932 (aged 63); Victoria County, New Brunswick, Canada
- Spouses: Agnes Dunbar (m. 1902; died 1911) Evelyn Whyte (m. 1930)

Archibald Fraser (April 22, 1869 – October 10, 1932) was a Scottish-born industrialist in New Brunswick involved in the forest and pulp and paper industries.

The son of Donald Fraser, he was born in Aberdeen and came to New Brunswick with his family four years later. His father had entered the lumber business by 1877 and, in 1884, Archibald and his brother Donald Jr. joined the family business. In 1917, they formed Fraser Companies Limited. The business expanded to include sawmills in New Brunswick and Quebec and sulphite pulp mills in Edmundston and Chatham. Fraser also served as a director of the Royal Bank of Canada, the New Brunswick Telephone Company, the Maritime Trust Company of Saint John and the Rolland Paper Company (now a division of Cascades).

He was married twice: first to Agnes Dunbar in 1902 (she died in 1911) and then, in 1930, to Evelyn Whyte.

Fraser died suddenly of a heart attack at the age of 63 on a holiday weekend at his hunting lodge near Nictau in Victoria County, New Brunswick.

At the time of his death, he was president of Fraser Companies, Limited, of Fraser Paper, Limited, of the Restigouche Company, Limited and of Snowflake Lime Limited.

In October 2000, a plaque commemorating Archibald Fraser was unveiled at Edmundston.
