= Mary (1806 ship) =

British slave, merchant, and whaling ship (1806–1825)

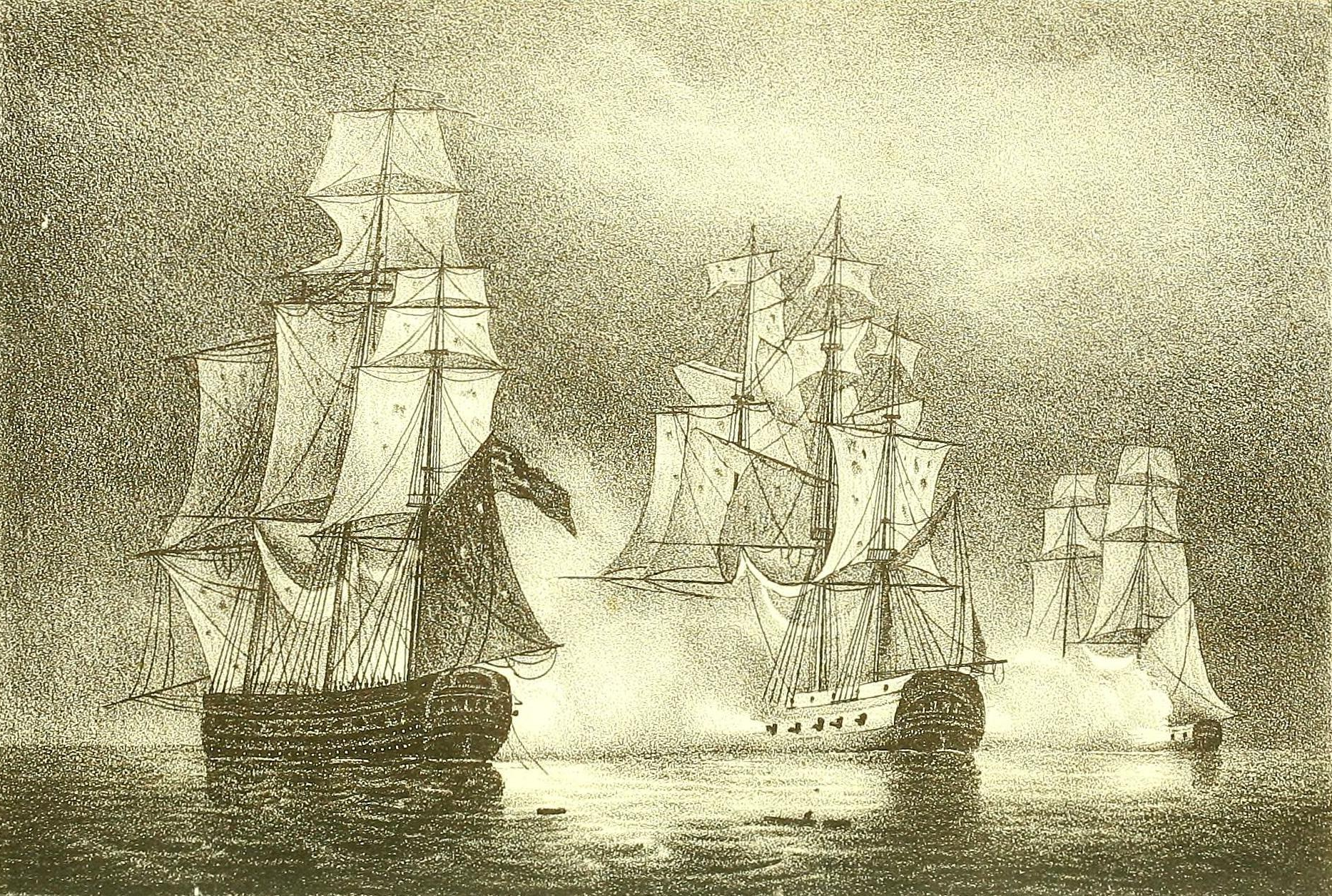
- Action, in the night, between the Mary, under Captain Crow, and two British Men of War, December 1806

History

United Kingdom
- Name: Mary
- Owner: 1806:Aspinal; 1807:Lees; 1808:Robinson; 1815:Robertson; 1820:Manley: 1820:Daniel Bennett & Co/Lydekker; 1825:Hill, Boulcott & Co.
- Builder: Liverpool
- Launched: 24 April 1806
- Fate: Wrecked 20 January 1825

General characteristics
- Tons burthen: 427, or 450(bm)
- Complement: 50
- Armament: 24 × 9-pounder guns

Mary was launched at Liverpool in 1806. She made one voyage as a slave ship in the triangular trade in enslaved people. During this voyage she engaged in a notable combat action at night with two British warships. After the British slave trade ended, she traded with Haiti and Brazil, and possibly made one voyage to India under license from the British East India Company (EIC). She then became a whaler and was lost in 1825 in the Pacific on the second of two whaling voyages.

== Career ==
Mary entered Lloyd's Register for 1806 with H. Crow, master, Aspinal, owner, and trade London–Africa.

=== Enslaving voyage ===
Captain Hugh Crow (or Crowe), acquired a letter of marque on 15 May 1806. Crow sailed from Liverpool on 9 June 1806. Mary gathered her captives at Bonny and sailed from Africa on 20 October. She then stopped in at São Tomé.

On 30 November there occurred an unfortunate incident. At 10pm, HMS Dart, Commander Joseph Spear, and Wolverine, Commander Francis Augustus Collier, came upon a ship that they suspected was a French privateer and that kept up a running fight until morning, only surrendering after her captain and several of her crew had been wounded, of whom six later died. The vessel turned out to be Mary. (Note: The slave trade was not, in 1806, illegal. The British Slave Trade Act 1807 abolished the trade by degrees, beginning in 1807.) Crow had thought that the two vessels chasing him in the dark were French privateers out of Cayenne and was determined not to surrender his vessel without a fight. Commander Spear gave him a letter of praise for his determined resistance and the fight became something of a sensation; on his return home Crow received honour, glory, and a substantial reward for his gallantry. Also, "many of the wretched negroes were killed or injured." (Note: Crow had earlier fought in two other engagements. The French vessel Robuste, of twenty-four 12-pounders and 150 men, had captured him in 1794. Then on 21 February 1800, as captain of Will, of eighteen 6-pounders and 50 men, he fought off a French privateer with the loss of three crewmen and two slaves killed and 10 wounded. He recounted his career and the fights in detail in his autobiography.)

Although many captains, fearful of revolt, were chary of arming any of their captives, Crow had trained several of his captives in small arms, passing powder, and other small duties. For their services they each received light trousers, a shirt, and a cap. These men may have been among the casualties in the action with the British warships.

Mary arrived at Kingston, Jamaica, on 12 December. She disembarked 393 captives, some of them wounded from the encounter with Dart and Wolverine. She left on 22 March 1807, and arrived back in England on 2 May. She had left with 56 crew men and had suffered four deaths on the overall voyage.

=== Merchantman ===
Lloyd's Register for 1807 showed Mary's master changing from Crow to J.M'Neal, her owner from Aspinal to Lees, and her trade from Liverpool–Africa to Liverpool–Hayti. In 1808 all changed again. Her new master was Bennil, her owner Robinson, and her trade London–Brazils.

Year	Master	Owner	Trade	Notes and source
1810	P.Bennet; Beilby	Robinson	London–Brazils; London–Hayti	Register of Shipping (RS)
1815	J.Bell	Robertson	London–Hayti	RS
1820	J. Gill (or Gibb)	Manley	London–India	RS

=== Whaler ===
By 1821 Mary's owners were Daniel Bennett & Co and John Lydekker (or Liddereid), her master was E. Reed, and her trade was London–Southern Fishery.

Captain Edward Reed sailed from England on 23 March 1821. Mary was reported to have been at the Cape of Good Hope and the Brazil Banks. She was reported to have been at "Woolwich Bay" (Walvis Bay) on 27 July with 28 tons of whale oil. She was reported to have been on the Brazil Banks on 7 May 1822 with 150 tons of whale oil and five tons of sperm oil. She returned to England on 11 January 1823 with 250 casks of oil (150 tuns whale oil and 5 tuns sperm oil), plus bone (baleen).

Captain Reed sailed from England on 1 May 1823, bound for the Sandwich Islands. Mary was at Honolulu between 18 and 29 February 1824 after having spent 10 months in the Marquesas. Carried Doctor Taylor. She returned to Honolulu on 7 March, and again on 6 November. The crew was suffering from scurvy but Mary had gathered 1600 barrels of whale oil.

During the voyage three crewmen were lost when a storm destroyed a whaleboat. Also, a number of crewmen absconded when she called at ports.

== Loss ==
Lloyd's List reported on 4 November 1825 that Mary, Reed, master, was lost on Jarvis's Island.

Mary had wrecked on Jarvis Island on 20 January 1825. She had grounded during the night on a landform not on their charts. The crew took to the boats and waited near Mary for dawn. In the morning the crew discovered they she was on a sandbank, not a reef. Mary had lost her masts, she was half full of water, and her back was broken. The crew salvaged what they could, though the cargo of 1800 barrels of oil was lost. They stayed on the island for six weeks. They were fortunate that it was the rainy season; they were able to save rain water in casks salvaged from the wreck. They also slept in casks, which protected them from the rains.

Mary's crew were in the process of creating a barge out of the wreckage when fortuitously the whalers Vansittart, Captain Beacon, and Francis, Captain Thomas Hunt, arrived. Both were also Bennett whalers and each took part of the crew. Vansittart arrived at Sydney in July with 16 crew members from Mary, including the second officer. Francis was not expected to call at Sydney. In April Captain Reed transferred to Phoenix, also a Bennett ship. She returned to London in November. Reed went on to captain the whaler Harriet.

Note: The hurricane that wrecked Mary may have also been the one that resulted in the loss of Bridges and the near loss of Alfred.
