= HMS Wolverine (1805) =

British brig-sloop (1805–1816)

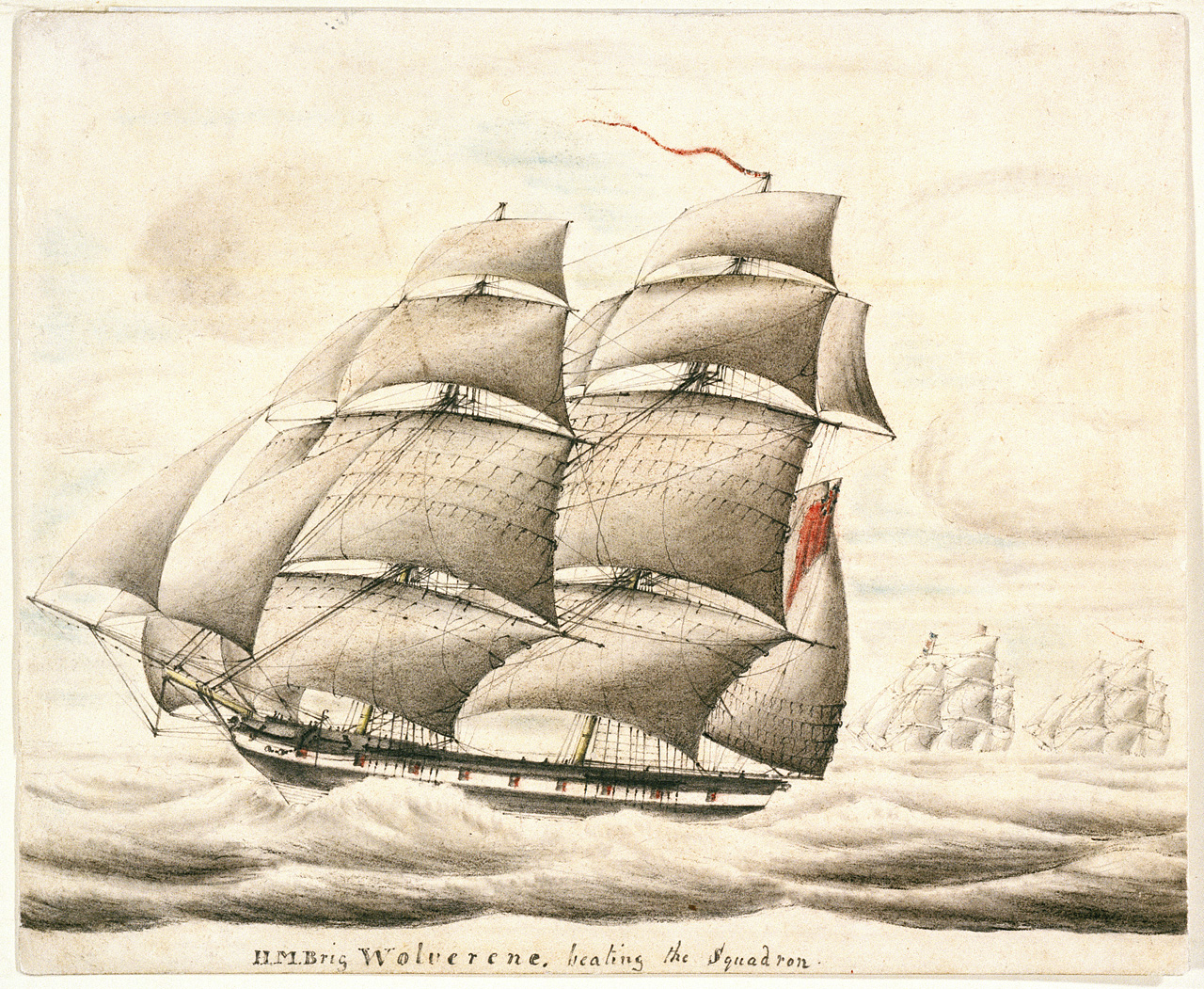
- HM Brig Wolverene beating the Squadron

History

United Kingdom
- Name: HMS Wolverine
- Ordered: 7 November 1803
- Builder: Thomas Owen, Topsham
- Laid down: February 1804
- Launched: 1 March 1805
- Decommissioned: Aug/Sept. 1815
- Honours and awards: Naval General Service Medal with clasp "Martinique"
- Fate: Sold 15 February 1816

General characteristics
- Class & type: Cruizer-class brig-sloop
- Tons burthen: 387 bm
- Length: 100 ft 1 1/2 in (30.5 m) (gundeck); 77 ft 4 1/2 in (23.6 m) (keel)
- Beam: 30 ft 8 in (9.3 m)
- Depth of hold: 12 ft 9 in (3.9 m)
- Sail plan: Brig rigged
- Complement: 121
- Armament: 16 × 32-pounder carronades + 2 × 6-pounder bow guns

Plan of the Wolverine

HMS Wolverine (or Wolverene) was a Royal Navy 18-gun Cruizer-class brig-sloop, launched in 1805 at Topsham, near Exeter. Early in her career she was involved in two fratricidal incidents, one involving a British frigate and then a newsworthy case in which she helped capture a British slave ship. She later captured a small naval vessel and several privateers, and took part in the invasion of Martinique, and during the War of 1812, in the attack on Baltimore. Wolverine was decommissioned in August or September 1815 and was sold on 15 February 1816.

== Service ==
Wolverine entered service in 1805 under Commander John Smith (or Smyth). In November Wolverine and the frigate Amethyst encountered each other off the coast of Madeira. After a series of ambiguous and misinterpreted moves by the other, the two captains mistook each other for enemies and opened fire. Both vessels survived and the two captains proceeded to exchange mutually recriminatory letters.

Commander Francis Augustus Collier replaced Smith on 15 January 1806. Wolverine then deployed to the Caribbean.

On 12 March Wolverine, after a chase of 15 hours, captured the French Navy schooner Tremeuse (or Trimeuse, or Tremieuse), which was armed with two 9-pounder carronades and one long 6-pounder; she had a crew of 53 men and was from Guadeloupe. She had been out 12 days without capturing anything. The Royal Navy took Trimeuse into service as Skipjack.

On 16 October Wolverine captured the packet Guadeloupe, of one gun and 42 men. On 25 October she recaptured the American vessel Franklin, which was carrying masts to Barbados and had been a prize to Guadeloupe.

Next, on 9 November, HMS Dart, with Wolverine in company, captured the 8-gun Jeune Gabrielle. She had thrown half her guns overboard during the chase. She was under the command of M. Auguste Boufford and had a crew of 75. She was out of Guadeloupe and had not made any captures. The next day Wolverine captured Marianne, of one gun and 46 men.

On 30 November 1806 there occurred a second unfortunate incident when Wolverine fired on a British merchant vessel engaged in lawful trade. At 10pm, Dart, under Commander Joseph Spear, and Wolverine came upon a ship that they suspected was a French privateer and that kept up a running fight until morning, only surrendering after her captain and several of her crew had been wounded, of whom six later died. The vessel turned out to be the British 24-gun slaver Mary, out of Liverpool, under Captain Hugh Crow (or Crowe). (Note: The slave trade was not, in 1806, illegal. Only in the next year did the Slave Trade Act 1807 abolish the slave trade for British subjects.) He had thought that the two vessels chasing him in the dark were French privateers out of Cayenne and was determined not to surrender his vessel without a fight. Commander Spear gave him a letter of praise for his determined resistance and the fight became something of a sensation; on his return home Crow received honour, glory, and a substantial reward for his gallantry. Also, "many of the wretched negroes were killed or injured." (Note: Crow was a slaver who had earlier fought in two other engagements. The French vessel Robuste, of twenty-four 12-pounders and 150 men, had captured him in 1794. Then on 21 February 1800, as captain of Will, of eighteen 6-pounders and 50 men, he fought off a French privateer with the loss of three crewmen and two slaves killed, and 10 men wounded. He recounted his career and the fights in detail in his autobiography.)

On 27 January 1807 Wolverine was in sight when Jason captured the French sloop Favorite. Jason had been detached, together with the brig Wolverine, to the coast of Surinam to search for Favorite, which she discovered in January and captured in a short engagement. Favorite had been a Royal Navy sloop that the French had captured in January 1806; the Royal Navy took her back into service as Goree.

Four days later, Wolverine chased and captured the French privateer Petite Confiance, which had been cruising from Guadeloupe for the previous month. During the chase she had thrown two of her three guns overboard. She had a crew of 50 and had been out of Guadeloupe for a month without taking any prizes.

On 22 April 1808, the sloop Goree, under Commander Joseph Spear, engaged the French brigs Palinure and Pilade in an inconclusive action. The schooner Superieur came to Goree's assistance, followed a little while later by the frigate Circe and Wolverine, which arrived too late to engage. On 31 October Circe captured Palinure.

Command briefly passed to Commander John Simpson in 1809, who commanded Wolverine during the invasion of Martinique in January and February 1809. On 15 January 1809 Wolverine, in company with Pompee, Captain and Circe, captured the French brig Josephine. That same day Wolverine captured Napoleon.

Simpson transferred to Goree and command of Wolverine passed to Commander Joseph Spear. On the morning of 12 April Spear arrived at the Admiralty office with Rear-Admiral Alexander Cochrane's dispatches announcing the surrender of Martinique. In 1847 the Admiralty authorized the issuance of the Naval General Service Medal with clasp "Martinique" to all still surviving participants in the campaign.

Commander Charles J. Kerr took command on 11 December 1809, transferring from Julia. On 27 September 1810 Wolverine had been in pursuit of a French brig when Rhin joined the chase and after two and a half hours captured the quarry off the Lizard. The French vessel was the privateer San Joseph, of Saint Malo, under the command of a Joseph Wittevronghel, a Dane. San Joseph was one year old, about 100 tons (bm), and armed with 14 guns though she was pierced for 16. She had only been out one day when the British captured her and had taken nothing. Also, Little Belt had been in company with Wolverine.

Lloyd's List reported on 17 May 1811 that Wolverine had left Gibraltar on 29 April as escort to a convoy of some 16 vessels, including the store ship Spy.

A court martial tried a seaman from Wolverine on 7 October 1811. The charge was that the seaman had absented himself without leave and had taken one of the ship's boats to do so. He received a sentence of 300 lashes.

On 17 November, Wolverine recaptured the sloop Minerva.

Wolverine was in sight on 15 February 1812 when the hired armed lugger Sandwich recaptured North Star.

On 7 November 1813, Wolverine captured the 6-gun Lugger no. 961, off Barfleur. No. 961 belonged to the Cherbourg flotilla. She was armed with six guns, had a crew of 32 men and was under the command of Lieutenant Berard. On 13 December Wolverine intercepted King of Rome, an American letter of marque, laden with colonial produce.

On 26 April 1814, Wolverine sailed with a convoy for Newfoundland, Nova Scotia, Quebec and New Brunswick. On 4 September Kerr became acting captain of Tonnant, the flagship of Sir Alexander Cochrane, on the coast of North America. Between 12 and 15 September, Wolverine participated in the unsuccessful British attack on Baltimore. On 5 October George Guy Burton was promoted to commander and removed from Tonnant to Wolverine,

== Fate ==
Burton sailed Wolverine home. Wolverine was paid off either on 27 August 1815, or 8 September 1815, and then put in ordinary at Deptford. The Admiralty listed her for sale on 29 January 1816, and then sold her on 15 February for £810.
