= True Briton (1775 ship) =

British slave ship (1775–1776)

History

Great Britain
- Name: True Briton
- Owner: Originally:Blundel & Co.; 1781: Hodgsons; 1786: Earle & Co.
- Launched: 1775, Liverpool
- Renamed: 1777: John; 1778: Bellona; 1786: Lord Stanley
- Fate: Not listed in 1778

General characteristics
- Tons burthen: 150, or 200, or 239, or 240, 250, or 253, or 259, or 260 (bm)
- Length: 92 ft 4 in (28.1 m)
- Beam: 24 ft 4 in (7.4 m)
- Complement: 1778: 45, or 140; 1781: 35; 1793: 60; 1796: 45; 1799: 30; 1800: 35; 1804: 36
- Armament: 1778: 16 × 6&9-pounder guns + 6 × 6-pounder coehorns + 12 swivel guns; 1781: 16 × 6-pounder guns + 4 carronades; 1793: 20 × 6&4–pounder guns; 1796: 18 × 9–pounder guns; 1799: 18 × 9–pounder guns; 1800: 18 × 9–pounder guns; 1804: 16 × 9–pounder guns
- Notes: Two decks & three masts

True Briton was launched at Liverpool in 1775. She made two voyages as a slave ship in the triangular trade in enslaved people. During the second of these voyages there was an unsuccessful insurrection by the captives she was carrying. Then in 1777–1778 she made another enslaving voyage, this time under the name John. On her return to Liverpool, she became the privateer Bellona, and succeeded in taking several prizes. Bellona then made three enslaving voyages. In 1786 her ownership changed, and so did her name. She became Lord Stanley, and under that name proceeded to make 11 more enslaving voyages. In 1794, at Havana, a deadly fever spread through the vessel, apparently after she had landed her captives. On her last voyage the captain acted with such brutality towards a black crew member that the man, who providentially survived, sued the captain when the vessel arrived at Liverpool and won substantial damages.

== Career ==
1st voyage transporting enslaved people (1775): Captain John Dawson sailed from Liverpool on 7 April 1775. He acquired captives at New Calabar and arrived at Jamaica with 327. True Briton arrived back at Liverpool on 6 December.

True Briton appeared in Lloyd's Register (LR), in 1776.

Year	Master	Owner	Trade	Source
1776	Jn.Dawson	Blundel & Co.	Liverpool–Africa	LR

2nd voyage transporting enslaved people (1776): Captain Dawson sailed from Liverpool on 17 March 1776. He acquired captives at Bonny and sailed from there on 14 June.

As she was coming over the bar the captives revolted and succeeded in killing the cooper and one or two seamen before the crew could re-establish control. A second report states that the sailmaker was killed and the cooper wounded. (Note: In the period 1775–1780, there are only 12 known instances of shipboard insurrections by captives. All were unsuccessful.) True Briton arrived at Jamaica in August with 340 captives. She sailed from Jamaica on 30 August and arrived back at Liverpool on 21 October.

The issue of Lloyd's Register for 1777 is not available online. The issue for 1778, however, shows that True Briton had become John.

Year	Master	Owner	Trade	Source
1778	B.Cazneau	John Dobson	Liverpool–Africa	LR

3rd voyage transporting enslaved people (1777–1778): Captain B. Cazneau sailed from Liverpool on 8 August 1778. He started embarking captives on 30 November, in the Gold Coast. John arrived at Kingston in 1778. She arrived back at Liverpool on 3 July 1778.

On her return to Liverpool, John became Bellona.

The British Admiralty gave notice in April 1777, that they were ready to issue letters of marque for privateers against the Americans. In March 1778, Great Britain broke off relations with France. Bellona then became a privateer. (Note: During this period privateers named Bellona also operated out of Bermuda, Bristol, Exeter, Glasgow, Guernsey, and London. Lloyd's List on occasion confused Bellona of Liverpool with Bellona of London, a confusion that made it into at least one secondary source.) Captain Patrick Fairweather acquired a letter of marque on 22 September.

Year	Master	Owner	Trade	Source & notes
1778	P.Fairweather		Liverpool privateer	LR; good repair 1778

On 4 December Bellona captured a schooner carrying 75 hogsheads of tobacco. However, the schooner ran aground on Carnarvon Bay and bilged.

On 18 December Bellona captured the sloop Canister, which was carrying 58 hogsheads of tobacco from Virginia to France.

On 31 January 1779 Bellona brought Amitie into Lisbon. Amitie was armed with 18 guns, 10 swivel guns, and had a crew of 54 men. She was sailing from St Ubes to South Carolina with a cargo of salt, wine, oil, fruit, soap, and several chests of arms. Fairweather had been at Lisbon when he had heard that Amitie was fitting out and he had sailed to intercept her. Amitie arrived at Liverpool on 23 February.

Next, Bellona captured Necessity. The capture took place on 14 March at 42°31′N 30°49′W. Necessity, of about 400 tons (bm), Peu Ardent, master, was armed with twelve 6 and 4-pounder guns. She was on her way from Bordeaux to Port au Prince with a cargo consisting of 2000 barrels of flour, 360 barrels of beef and pork, 60 tons of wine, and other general cargo such as cordage. Necessity arrived at Lisbon on 25 March.

In May 1780, Bellona, Fairweather, master, arrived at Jamaica with a prize worth £4,000. Bellona was on a cruize, and coming from Africa. (Note: There is no indication that she had engaged in slaving.) Bellona, Fairweather, master, arrived back at Liverpool on 17 November.

On her return her owners sold Bellona. New owners transferred her from privateering to enslaving.

Year	Master	Owner	Trade	Source
1781	Fairweather; R.Holland	Bolden & Co.	Liverpool privateer Liverpool–Africa	LR; good repair 1778
1782	R.Holland	Hodgsons & Co.	Liverpool–Africa	LR; good repair 1778 & 1780

4th voyage transporting enslaved people (1781–1783): Captain Francis Holland acquired a letter of marque on 11 September 1781. He sailed from Liverpool on 26 October. He acquired captives at Ouidah/Whydah, and Bellona stopped at São Tomé on her way to the West Indies. She sailed from there on 25 July, "full of slaves". She arrived at Kingston, Jamaica on 25 September 1782 with 411 captives. She left Jamaica on 22 December, bound for Liverpool, and arrived there on 8 March 1783. She had left Liverpool with 52 crew members and had suffered 11 crew deaths on her voyage.

5th voyage transporting enslaved people (1783–1784): Captain Holland sailed from Liverpool on 19 June 1783. He acquired captives at Bonny. Bellona arrived at Kingston on 6 February 1784, with 525 captives. She sailed for Liverpool on 22 March, and arrived back there on 9 May. She had sailed from Liverpool with 43 crew members, and had suffered five crew deaths on her voyage.

6th voyage transporting enslaved people (1785): Captain Holland sailed from Liverpool on 2 February 1785. She acquired captives at Bonny. She left the Bonny River and crossed the bar in company with Champion, but then became leaky and had to put into Prince's Island. Bellona arrived at Dominica in July with 340 captives. She sailed for Liverpool on 12 October and arrived home on 26 November.

In 1786 Bellona's ownership changed again, and her name became Lord Stanley. She remained in the trade of transporting enslaved people.

Year	Master	Owner	Trade	Source & notes
1787	J.Smale	Earle & Co.	Liverpool–Africa	LR; large repair 1783

7th voyage transporting enslaved people (1786–1787): Captain John Smale sailed from Liverpool on 31 March 1786. He acquired captives at the Cameroons and arrived at Barbados on 15 May 1787 with 204 captives. Lord Stanley sailed for Liverpool on 23 June and arrived back there on 3 August. She had left Liverpool with 52 crew members and had suffered 23 crew deaths on her voyage.

Dolben's Act took effect in 1781. It limited the number of captives a vessel was allowed to carry without penalty. At a burthen of 200 tons, the cap for Lord Stanley would have been 345; for a burthen of 250 tons it would have been 389.

8th voyage transporting enslaved people (1788–1789): Captain Thomas Jolly sailed from Liverpool on 30 April 1788. Shortly after she left Liverpool, Lord Stanley, Jolly, master, had to put into Kindale as she had lost her main mast. She acquired captives at Calabar, stopped at St Vincent, and arrived at Grenada on 28 August with 300 captives. Lord Stanley arrived back at Liverpool on 17 October 1789. She had left Liverpool with 38 crew members and had suffered 14 crew deaths on her voyage.

9th voyage transporting enslaved people (1790–1791): According to one source, Captain George Farquhar sailed for the West Coast of Africa on 24 July 1790. However, Lord Stanley, Lawson, master, arrived at Angola. Then, on 24 or 27 May, Lord Stanley, Farquhar, master, left Ascension, "All Well". Lord Stanley, Lawson, master, arrived at Grenada with 346 captives. She sailed for Liverpool on 2 July and arrived there on 11 August. She had left Liverpool with 30 crew members and had suffered two crew deaths on her voyage.

10th voyage transporting enslaved people (1791–1792): Captain George Farquhar sailed for the West Coast of Africa on 17 December 1791. She arrived at Grenada in July 1792 with 372 captives. She returned to Liverpool on 26 October 1792. She had left Liverpool with 30 crew members and had suffered no crew deaths on her voyage.

Christopher Bowes was surgeon aboard Lord Stanley and he kept a log that has survived. He reported that she had left Africa with 389 captives and had suffered 16 deaths among her captives. That was a mortality rate of 4%, too high for Bowes to earn a bonus.

Year	Master	Owner	Trade	Source & notes
1794	Farquhar	Hodgson	Liverpool–Africa	LR; large repair 1783, good repair 1790, & repairs 1791

11th voyage transporting enslaved people (1793–1794): War with France had broken out in February 1793 and Captain George Farquhar acquired a letter of marque on 1 March. He sailed from Liverpool on 9 April. Shortly after leaving Liverpool, Lord Stanley brought into Kinsale Julie Chere, of about 250 tons (bm). She was on her way from Guadeloupe to Bordeaux with a cargo of sugar, coffee, cotton etc. Lord Stanley started embarking captives on 13 October at Ambriz. She left Africa on 30 December, stopped at Barbados, and arrived at Havana on 1 March 1794. She had embarked 391 captives and she arrived with 388, for a 1% mortality rate. (Note: After the passage of Dolben's Act, masters received a bonus of £100 for a mortality rate of under 2%; the ship's surgeon received £50. For a mortality rate between two and three per cent, the bonus was halved. There was no bonus if mortality exceeded 3%.)

In June, starting about 6 June 1794, while Lord Sinclair was in the harbour at Havana, a fever broke out on her that proceeded to spread to other vessels in the harbour, and to the city. By one report, 19 of the 24 officers and men who developed the fever died.

She sailed for Liverpool on 5 May and arrived back there on 1 July. She had left Liverpool with 67 crew members, and she had lost 17 on the voyage.

12th voyage transporting enslaved people (1794–1796): Captain George Farquhar sailed from Liverpool on 22 October 1794. He acquired captives at Ambriz. Lord Stanley stopped at St Kitts. She was sailing from St Kitts down the north side of San Domingo when on 30 October 1795 she encountered a French privateer schooner of 12 guns. An inconclusive single ship action ensued but after 45 minutes the privateer broke off the engagement and sailed away. She had had seven men killed; Lord Stanley had no casualties. Some other privateers approached later but did not attempt to engage. Lord Stanley was able also to protect a Danish brig that had been plundered by a privateer from Port-au-Paix. She arrived at Havana with 365 captives. (Note: Another report has her arriving with 398 captives) (Note: The Trans Atlantic Slave Trade database gives the arrival date as 26 October, but this is inconsistent with the Farquhar's report of the engagement.) Lord Stanley sailed for Liverpool on 5 January 1795 and arrived there on 22 February. She had left Liverpool with 45 crew members and had suffered 10 crew deaths on her voyage. When Lord Stanley arrived at Liverpool she also brought the news that while she had been at Havana, the Spanish ship of the line San Lorenzo had arrived there carrying the "coffin, bones and fetters of Christopher Columbus" from San Domingo to be re-interred at Havana with "the highest military honours."

13th voyage transporting enslaved people (1796–1797): Captain Edward Hollywood (or Holywood), acquired a letter of marque on 29 July 1796. He sailed from Liverpool on 11 August. In 1796, 103 vessels sailed from English ports, bound to Africa to acquire and transport enslaved people; 94 of these vessels sailed from Liverpool.

Lord Stanley acquired captives at the Congo River. She arrived at Kingston on 12 March 1797 with 374 captives. She sailed from Kingston on 17 April. Hollywood died on 25 April 1797. Lord Stanley arrived at Liverpool on 8 June. Captain John Maginnis had replaced Hollywood. (Note: Maginni had been impressed from Lord Stanley on 26 June 1794. He had returned to Lord Stanley as chief mate in 1796.) She had sailed from Liverpool with 51 crew members and had suffered 12 crew deaths on her voyage.

14th voyage transporting enslaved people (1798): Captain William Murdock sailed from Liverpool on 2 February 1798. (Note: Murdock had been surgeon on six enslaving ships before becoming master on Lord Stanley. He made eight voyages in all as master of enslaving ships.) In 1798, 160 vessels sailed from English ports, bound to Africa to acquire and transport enslaved people; 149 of these vessels sailed from Liverpool.

Lord Stanley acquired captives at Calabar and arrived at Kingston on 1 September with 385 captives. Lord Stanley sailed for Liverpool on 26 September and arrived there on 26 November. She had left Liverpool with 47 crew members and had suffered 11 crew deaths on her voyage.

15th voyage transporting enslaved people (1799–1800): Captain William Murdock acquired a letter of marque on 26 January 1799. He sailed from Liverpool on 5 February, but Lord Stanley had to put back after she had sprung her foremast in a gale. In 1799, 156 vessels sailed from English ports, bound to Africa to acquire and transport enslaved people; 134 of these vessels sailed from Liverpool.

Lord Stanley acquired captives at Angola and arrived at Kingston on 13 December with 386. (Note: Her cap was 394. This suggests the measurements were based on a burthen of 255 tons.) She sailed from Kingston on 30 January 1800, and arrived there on 3 April. She had left Liverpool with 47 crew members and had suffered five crew deaths on her voyage.

Year	Master	Owner	Trade	Source & notes
1800	Murdock; J.Kirby	Clark & Co. W.Aspinall	Liverpool–Africa	LR; repairs 1796

16th voyage transporting enslaved people (1800–1801): Captain John Kirby acquired a letter of marque on 28 August 1800. He had been mate under Hugh Crow, a famed captain of enslaving ships, including Kitty's Amelia, which in 1807 was the last vessel to leave the United Kingdom on a legal slave trading voyage. W.Aspinall owned both Lord Stanley and Will, Crow, master, and Aspinall instructed the two masters to sail in company, with Crow the senior master.

Captain Kirby sailed from Liverpool on 6 November 1800, together with Will and some other vessels. In 1800, 133 vessels sailed from English ports, bound to Africa to acquire and transport enslaved people; 120 of these vessels sailed from Liverpool.

Lord Stanley and Will arrived at Bonny some months later. There they took on the captain and crew of Diana, which had wrecked. Lloyd's List reported that Diana, of Liverpool, Ward, master, had wrecked on the Bonny Bar, but that the crew had been saved, and that Will and Lord Stanley had brought them into Jamaica.

Lord Stanley arrived at Kingston on 20 April 1801 with 260 captives. She had left Liverpool with 37 crew members and she arrived with 35. She sailed from Kingston on 12 July, and arrived back at Liverpool on 31 August. She had suffered two crew member deaths on her voyage.

17th voyage transporting enslaved people (1804–1805): Captain Thomas Livesley acquired a letter of marque on 21 June 1804. He sailed from Liverpool on 23 July 1804. In 1804, 147 vessels sailed from English ports, bound to Africa to acquire and transport enslaved people; 126 of these vessels sailed from Liverpool.

Lord Stanley acquired captives at Bonny and arrived at Kingston on 22 December with 249 captives. She sailed for Liverpool on 21 April 1805 and arrived there on 5 July. She had left Liverpool with 34 crew members and had suffered three crew deaths on her voyage.

Before leaving Jamaica, Captain Livesley hired a black man, Potter Jackson, as his steward. Jackson was accused of having stolen some money from a passenger, and when he would neither confess nor reveal where he had supposedly hidden the money, Captain Livesley had him flogged, and had salt rubbed into the wounds. The floggings occurred repeatedly between 4 and 14 June, and Daniel Robinson, the second mate, also engaged at Jamaica, reported that Jackson had received over 1000 lashes. When Lord Stanley arrived at Liverpool on 5 July, Jackson was put on shore where first a physician and then the city infirmary treated him, with the result that Jackson survived. Jackson sued Livesley. The judge, Lord Ellenborough, stated that "such savage and unprovoked cruelty... had never before disgraced the Annals of a British Court of Justice". Justice Ellenborough awarded Jackson £500, the amount claimed.

== Fate ==
Lord Stanley was last listed in 1805.
