= John Ellerker Boulcott =

British shipowner and merchant (1784–1855)

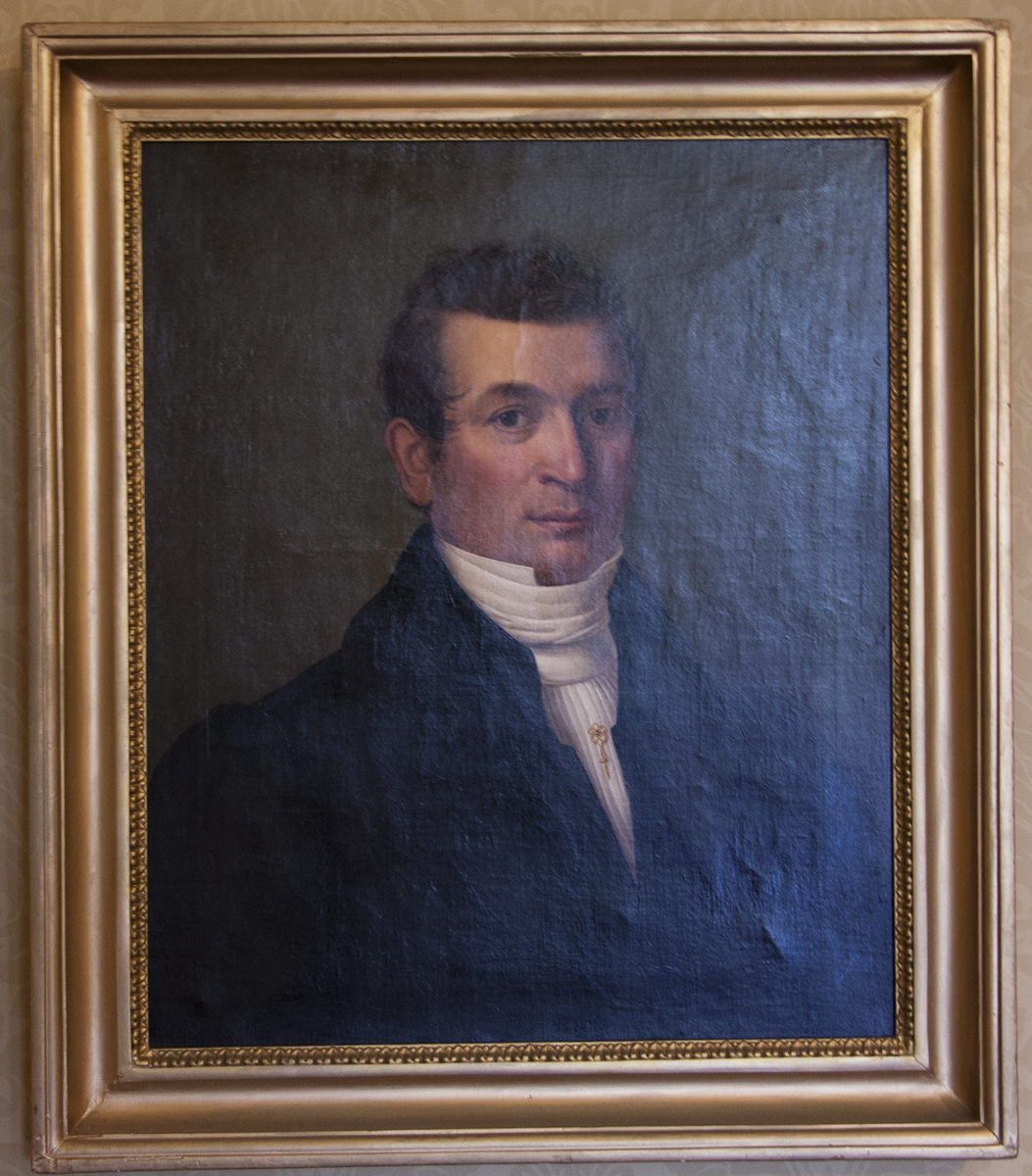
- Born: 28 December 1784; Limehouse, London, UK
- Died: 8 December 1855 (aged 70); Ewell, Epsom, Surrey
- Occupations: Merchant, shipowner

John Ellerker Boulcott (28 December 1784 – 8 December 1855) was an English merchant and shipowner. He was a director of the London and Dublin Bank and also a director of the New Zealand Company and he served as the sheriff of Merioneth in Wales. He owned considerable land and buildings in London and other property just outside the city by the time of his death in 1855.

== Early life and family ==
John Ellerker Boulcott was born on 28 December 1784 at Limehouse, Stepney, Middlesex, to John Boulcott (1761–1833) and his wife Mary Boulcott (née Crew).

His father, John Boulcott senior, was a timber merchant in London by 1794. John senior was in partnership with his son Joseph Crew Boulcott (1788–1850) with a yard in Narrow St, Ratcliff, London, by June 1810. That business continued to operate till 1834 under the name of John Boulcott & Son. The John Boulcott who was a director of the Commercial Dock Company between 1814 and 1825 was probably John senior as the dock specialised in timber imports. John senior was also described as a Russia Merchant by 1800, indicating that some of the lumber he sold was imported from the Baltic States, then under the control of Russia.

== Work ==
=== Shipbroker ===
The first certain reference to his son, John Ellerker Boulcott, comes in 1821 when he was operating as a shipbroker from premises at 21 Water Lane, London. He was in partnership with William Cannon and this arrangement continued till at least 1834.

Shipbrokers were maritime middlemen, intermediaries who brought together sellers and buyers of shipping in return for a commission payment from each. Some also functioned as shipping agents or vessel managers, finding crews, cargoes and passengers, supplying provisions and equipment and arranging insurance and handling port clearance documents for departing ships. For arriving vessels they would supervise the payment of crews, oversee the discharge of passengers and cargo, pay any customs duties due and arrange necessary maintenance and repair on the vessel. Boulcott seems to have specialised in providing these services to whaling and sealing vessels based in London.

=== Oil merchant ===
John Boulcott & Co were also listed as oil merchants at St Paul's Wharf by 1834 and later, as merchants and shipowners at 80 Wapping Wall, London. He also seems to have had a sideline as a ship biscuit maker by 1823 in partnership with other members of the Boulcott and Hill families and this continued till at least 1842.

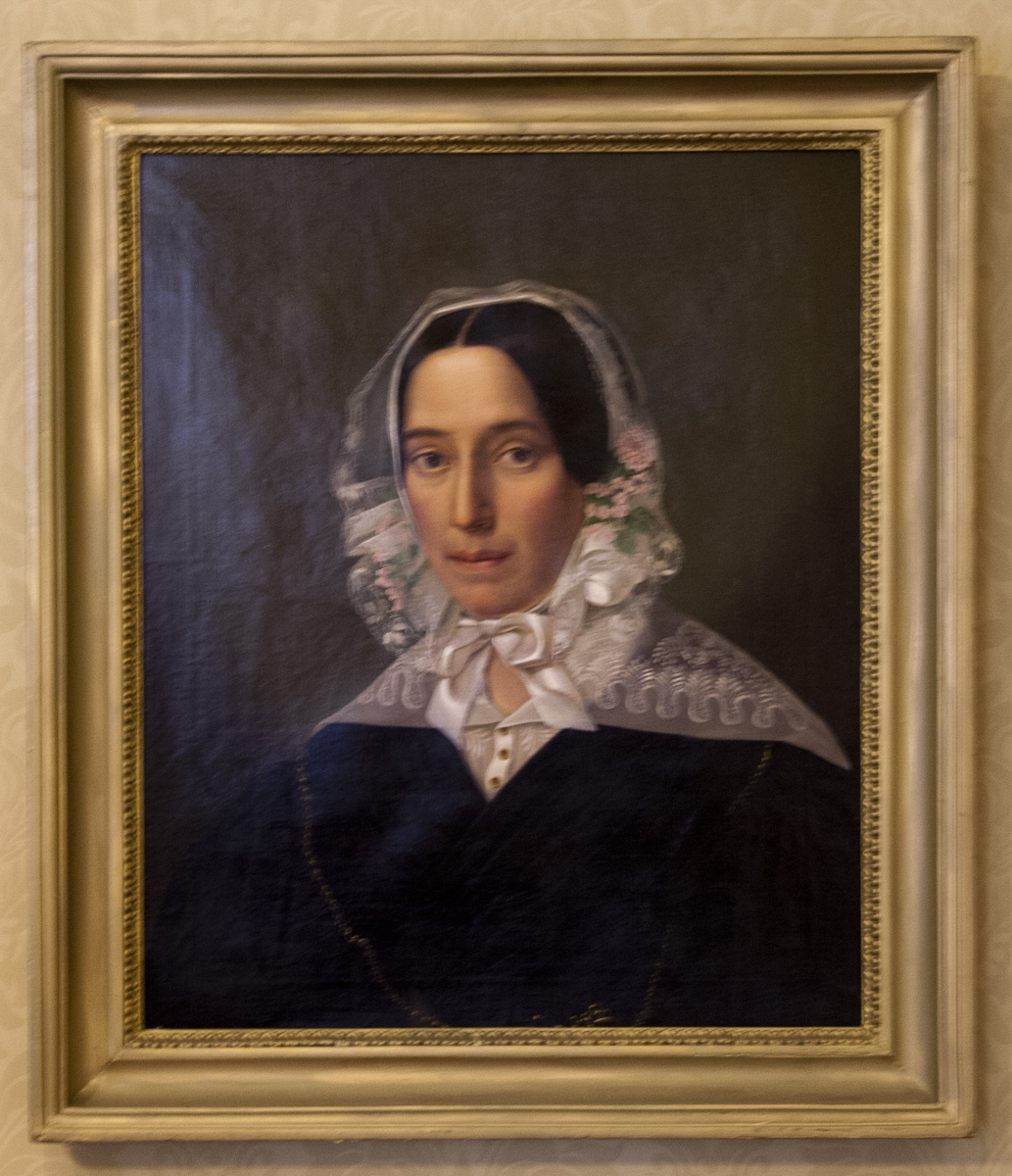
Mary Boulcott (née Hill)

=== Shipowner ===
Boulcott was the principal owner of at least thirteen vessels between 1818 and 1853. These were Atlas (1814–18), L'Aigle (from 1818 to 1829), Mary (1824–1847), Harriet (1834–1839), Hopewell (1818–1825), Rochester (1818–1821), Vittoria (1829–1830), Albion (1829–1832), Grant (1843–1853), Governor (1843–1849), Rover (1844–1848) William (1850–1851) and Brougham (1843–1853). At least one of these vessels he owned in partnership with his in-laws, James and Almon Hill, shipbuilders of West India Docks. As well as managing his own vessels, he was the agent on the docks for many other owners of whaling and sealing ships based in London. The captain of one of his four South Sea whaling ships named an atoll in the Pacific Mary Boulcott Island.

He was a director and shareholder in the New Zealand Company. The company began the organised systematic colonization of New Zealand after it was annexed by Britain in 1840. He was also a director of the London and Dublin Bank (1843–1847).

He held the office of the High Sheriff of Merionethshire in Wales for 1836–37.

== Private life ==
He married Mary Hill on 10 October 1818 at St Anne's Church, Limehouse, London. The couple had 11 children, all born at Stratford House, Stratford, West Ham, Essex. Two of his sons, Joseph (1809–1849) and Almon (1814–1880), later settled in New Zealand. Boulcott is the name of a suburb in Lower Hutt City on the North Island. The family also gave its name to Boulcott Street in the centre of Wellington.

In 1840 John Boulcott had to vacate his home, Stratford House, Essex, on account of the construction of the Eastern Counties Railway. Among the household furnishings offered for sale were "curiosities from the South Seas". By 1852, he was living at 8 Hyde Park Square.

John Ellerker Boulcott was 70 years of age when he died on 9 June 1855 at 8 Onslow Square, Ewell, Epsom, Surrey, England. His estate included a 75-acre farm near Bishop Stortford, 13 shops and three cottages in the village. He also owned the Waggon and Horses public house in Saffron Waldon. His London assets included warehouses, a wharf and land on the Thames at Wapping Wall.
