= HMS Skipjack (1806) =

History

France
- Name: Trimeuse
- Builder: American
- Commissioned: Purchased April 1805 at Pointe-à-Pitre, Guadeloupe
- Captured: 14 March 1806

United Kingdom
- Name: HMS Skipjack
- Acquired: 14 March 1806
- Fate: Breakwater at Demerara on 7 January 1809

General characteristics
- Displacement: 110 tons (French)
- Tons burthen: 6 (French; "of load")
- Length: 20.46 m (67.1 ft)
- Beam: 5.42 m (17.8 ft)
- Propulsion: Sails
- Sail plan: Schooner
- Complement: 35, but 53 (at capture)
- Armament: At capture: 1 × 6-pounder gun + 2 × 9-pounder carronades; British service: 12 guns

HMS Skipjack was the French naval schooner Trimeuse, commissioned at Guadeloupe in 1805. The Royal Navy captured her in 1806 and took her into service. She was paid off in 1808 and was used as a breakwater in 1809.

== Tremeuse ==
On 12 March Wolverine, after a chase of 15 hours, captured the French Navy schooner Trimeuse (or Tremeuse, or Tremieuse), armed with two 9-pounder carronades and one long 6-pounder; she had a crew of 53 men and was from Guadeloupe. She had been out 12 days without capturing anything. The Royal Navy took Trimeuse into service as Skipjack.

== British service and fate ==
Lieutenant Samuel Malbon commissioned Skipjack on 14 March 1806. She was paid off on 17 January 1808. A year later, on 7 January 1809, she was a breakwater at Demerara.
