= Phoenix (1809 ship) =

History

France
- Name: Phénix
- Namesake: Phoenix
- Builder: Bordeaux
- Launched: 1809
- Fate: Captured 12 September 1810

United Kingdom
- Name: Phoenix
- Owner: 1811: Gould & Co.; 1812: Daniel Bennett & Co.
- Builder: France
- Acquired: 1811 by purchase
- Fate: Lost c.1829

General characteristics
- Tons burthen: 337, or 342, or 348 (bm)
- Length: 99 ft 6 in (30.3 m)
- Beam: 28 ft 2 in (8.6 m)
- Complement: 1810: 120; 1811: 20
- Armament: 1810: 18 × 18-pounder carronades (English); 1811: 14 × 18-pounder guns + 12 × 9-pounder guns; 1813: 8 guns
- Notes: Two decks & three masts

Phoenix was a vessel launched in France in 1809. After the frigate HMS Aigle captured her she was sold and her new owners employed her as whaler. She visited the Galapagos islands in July 1823. In 1824, while under the command of John Palmer, she discovered Phoenix Island, later known as Rawaki Island (also Kanton Island). She is last listed in 1829.

== French privateer ==
Phénix was built in Bordeaux in 1809. In 1810 she was under the command of Jacques François Perroud, a notable French captain with a long history of privateering. Under Perroud's command, Phénix made a number of captures.

On 25 January 1810 the privateer Phoenix, of 20 guns and 110 men, belonging to Bordeaux, captured Donna Maria, Lunes, master, which had been sailing from Boston to Lisbon. However, on 9 February HMS Conflict recaptured Donna Maria on 9 February; she arrived at Plymouth on 24 February.

On 13 March, the English ship Chatham, which had sailed from Georgia with a cargo of rice and cotton, arrived at Paimbœuf. Chatham was a prize to Phoenix, of Bordeaux.

On 12 September 1810, Aigle captured Phénix. (Note: Demerliac conflates the Phénix that Aigle captured with an earlier Phénix. However the descriptions of the two vessels show a number of discrepancies.) Aigle was at 45°29′N 28°40′W at 11a.m. on 12 September when she sighted a strange sail coming towards her. The unknown vessel approached but as she got within about 9 miles of Aigle turned and sailed away from her. Aigle gave chase and after 13 hours and 130 miles succeeded in capturing her quarry. Captain Wolfe, of Aigle, was fulsome in his praise of Phoenix, her master, and crew. He described Phoenix as "nearly new, strong built, and Copper fastened." She had outsailed four pursuers in the 50 days she had been out and Aigle only caught her due to a fortuitous gale of wind; on the way into Plymouth, the captured Phoenix always led Aigle. Perroud had exhibited superior seamanship until the wind enabled Aigle to come up. Lastly, Phoenix's crew was "the best Crew I ever saw, composed of strong, healthy, active, stout young Seamen."

Phoenix, of "18 Guns and 120 Men", arrived at Plymouth at the end of September. At about the same time Agenoria too arrived in Plymouth. Phoenix had on 24 August captured the American bark Agenoria, which had been sailing from New Orleans to Liverpool with a cargo of cotton, but HMS Manilla had recaptured her. Phoenix had also captured, on 14 August, the English brig Unity, which had been carrying a cargo of fish from Newfoundland to Lisbon.

== British whaler ==
Phoenix first appeared in the supplement to Lloyd's Register for 1811. Her owner's name is given as Gould & Co., and her master as William Pyke. Initially, her trade was given as Plymouth to London. Pyke received a letter of marque on 7 June 1811. In 1812 her master became "Parker", and her trade changed to London–South Seas, that is she became a whaler. In 1812 her owner became Daniel Bennett, owner of several whalers, and she embarked for the South Seas whale fisheries in February 1812.

Phoenix returned to London in 1813 with 205 tons of sperm oil. She then sailed for the whale fisheries again, returning in May 1814, before leaving again in August. In 1815 her trade became Plymouth - London.

However, Captain R. Murray took command in 1815 while Phoenix was in the Australia and New Zealand grounds after Parker broke a leg. That year, Phoenix was recorded as being in the Bay of Islands, New Zealand. By 1816 Parker was again master, and Phoenix was no longer armed. Phoenix was reported to be at 11°0′N 28°40′W on 22 September 1817 on her way from London to the South Seas.

Lloyd's Register for 1821 gives Phoenix a new master with J. Bennett replacing Parker. Phoenix and Bennet were reported to be at 5°0′S 110°0′W on 18 November 1821 with 133 tons of sperm oil.

Then in 1823 Lloyd's Register shows Palmer replacing J. Bennet as master. William Dalton signed on to Phoenix as a doctor a year after qualifying in medicine, and shortly before she sailed in February 1823. He would go on to keep a journal of the voyage that has proved a useful source for a number of discoveries and observations.

On 23 February 1824 Palmer discovered an island at 3°39′S 170°30′W that he named Phoenix Island.

On 5 August Phoenix, Captain John Palmer, and Mary, Captain Edward Reed, visited Kanton Island. Dalton named the island, at 2°48′S 172°10′W, Mary Ballcott's Island. (Note: Mary Balcott (or Boulcott) was the sister of T.E. Boulcott, and the wife of James Hill, part-owners of Mary.)

In April 1825 Captain Reed transferred to Phoenix from Frances, which had rescued him and his crew after Mary had wrecked in January.

Phoenix returned to England in November 1825.

== Fate ==
Phoenix sailed on 5 December 1828. She was reported on 22 January 1830 to have been at Tahiti. Then James Colvin reported at Honolulu that Phoenix had been lost at Mounts Bay.

Phoenix is last listed in Lloyd's Register and in the Register of Shipping in 1829. The Register of Shipping has her master as W. Phillips. Bennett is still her owner and her trade is still London–South Seas fishery.

== Building a career ==
One of her crew was Robert Clark Morgan, who rose through the ranks to become a captain of a whaling ship. On Phoenix he was an apprentice (June 1814 - June 1819), able seaman (June 1819 - September 1822), 2nd Mate (January 1823 - November 1825), and 1st Mate (May 1826 - September 1828). He then became master on Sir Charles Price, another Bennett whaler.

== Painting ==
Phoenix has been immortalized in J. Steven Dews' painting "The Whaler Phoenix off Greenwich 1820".
