= HMS York (1796) =

Royal Navy 64 gun ship-of-the-line

History

Great Britain
- Name: Royal Admiral
- Builder: Barnard, Deptford
- Laid down: March 1795
- Launched: 24 March 1796
- Renamed: HMS York
- Fate: Wrecked January 1804

General characteristics
- Class & type: 64-gun third rate ship of the line
- Tons burthen: 143330/94 (bm)
- Length: 174 ft 3 in (53.1 m) (overall); 144 ft 4 in (44.0 m) (keel)
- Beam: 43 ft 2 1/2 in (13.2 m)
- Depth of hold: 19 ft 7 1/2 in (6.0 m)
- Propulsion: Sails
- Sail plan: Full-rigged ship
- Armament: Lower deck: 26 × 24-pounder guns; Upper deck: 26 × 18-pounder guns; QD: 10 × 9-pounder guns; Fc: 2 × 9-pounder guns

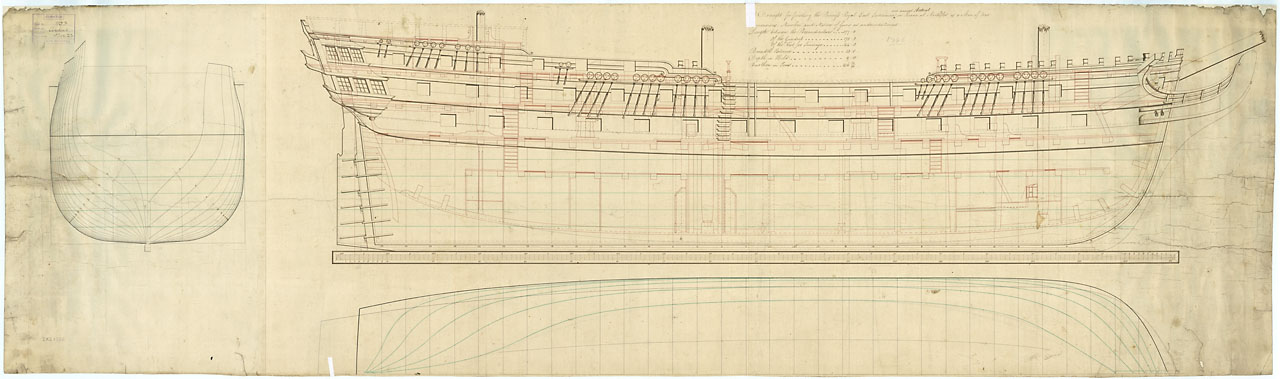
Plan showing the body plan, sheer lines with inboard detail, and longitudinal half-breadth for fitting the Lancaster (1796) and Monmouth (1796), East India Company ships, as 64-gun Third Rate, two-deckers.

HMS York was a 64-gun third rate ship of the line of the Royal Navy. She was launched on 24 March 1796 as the East Indiaman Royal Admiral, sailing to India, China and Australia before being purchased by the government Navy Board. Commissioned as HMS York she served briefly in the West Indies where she captured numerous small vessels. On a voyage across the North Sea in December 1803 she was lost and her wreckage lost in 1804.

== Origins ==
She had originally been laid down at Barnard's Deptford yard as an East Indiaman named Royal Admiral. The outbreak of the French Revolutionary Wars resulted in a shortage of warships, which led the Navy Board to purchase five ships being built or serviced in commercial dockyards along the River Thames and to complete them as warships. Alongside Royal Admiral, the Navy acquired the merchantmen Belmont, Princess Royal, Earl Talbot and Pigot; they became HMS Monmouth, HMS Ardent, HMS Agincourt, and HMS Lancaster respectively. As a 64-gun ship, York was a small third rate; this combined with her unusual build resulting from her conversion from a mercantile craft to a warship to make her a slightly ungainly and awkward ship.

== Career ==
Captain John Ferrier commissioned York in April 1796. He then sailed her for the Leeward Islands on 4 January 1797.

She spent much of her early career in the Caribbean Sea.

On 8 February 1798, she captured the small American schooner Fancy near St Thomas. York had to fire 15 shots before the schooner hove to, and when the boarding party from York arrived, they found 12 French passengers aboard, who were in the act of throwing five bags of money overboard. York brought Fancy into Môle-Saint-Nicolas where she was condemned as a prize. Apparently she had also been carrying 25,000 dollars of gold hidden on board but that most of it had been smuggled ashore. (Note: The information comes from a website that does not identify its sources, but in this case one may infer that the information was a personal communication to the website owner by a descendant of John Ferrier.)

In June–July 1799, York captured Santa Dorval, a Spanish packet boat, of four guns, 22 men, and 86 tons (bm). She was sailing from Vera Cruz to Havanna, and under the command of Lieutenant Don Joseph Bonefacio of the Spanish navy. Carnatic, Alarm, Thunderer, and Volage were in company with York.

Then in June 1799 York captured several merchant vessels:

- Spanish schooner Jesus Maria, sailing from Jamaica to Porto Rico with a false pass, carrying provisions and sundries;
- Schooner Christopher, under American colours, sailing from Arrcoa bound Baltimore with a cargo of coffee and tobacco (Dutch property);
- Brig James, under American colours, sailing from Cape Francois to Philadelphia with a cargo of coffee and sugar (French property);
- Brigs Harriot and Ann, under American colours, sailing from Cape Francois to Charleston with a cargo of coffee and sugar (French property);
- Schooner Eliza, under American colours, sailing from Jeremie to Saint Augustine with a cargo of coffee and sugar.

In July, York and Maidstone captured or detained:

- Brig Ariel, under American colours, sailing from Jeremie to Baltimore, with a cargo of 146,000 pounds of coffee;
- Schooner Lydia, under American colours, sailing from Tauxillo (probably Trujillo, Honduras), to Havana with sugar and indigo;
- Brig Romulus (detained), under American colours, sailing from Havanna to Charlestown, with 662 boxes of sugar;
- Ship Flora, with Spanish and American papers, from Carthagena, Spanish Main, and bound to New York and Cadiz, with a cargo of cotton and fustick, and 81,000 dollars in gold (secreted);
- Schooner Fair American, under American colours, sailing from Barracoa to Baltimore, with 183,000 pounds of coffee and 10,000 pounds of sugar.

In late 1800, York captured Cronberg, Molder, master, which had been sailing from St Croix and Havana to London. York brought Cronberg into Jamaica.

In 1801 York sailed back to Britain as escort to a convoy of 155 merchant vessels, all of which reached their destination safely. For his service the West Indian merchants thanked Ferrier and presented him with a piece of plate. (Note: One of the convoy vessels was the slave ship Will, under the command of the renowned Captain Hugh Crow. Ferrier appointed Crow senior captain of the convoy, and placed Will at the rear of the convoy as "whipper-in". Will encountered Hector, Blackie, master, of Liverpool, which was not part of the convoy but was in a sinking state. Hector capsized before Crow could get her crew off, but he was still able to save all but one man on her, a passenger who drowned as she capsized and went under.)

York then served under Admiral Nelson in his unsuccessful attacks on Boulogne.

On the night of 15 August the boats of the Third Division, under Captain Isaac Cotgrave, assembled on York's deck. They attacked but had to withdraw between 3 and 4am on the morning of 16 August. In the attack, the British lost five officers and men killed, and 31 wounded. Three of the dead and 16 of the wounded were from York.

York was paid off and placed into ordinary in June 1802 at Woolwich. Between October 1802 and August 1803 she underwent repair and refitting at Deptford. Captain Henry Mitford recommissioned her in June 1803. (Note: Mitford was the eldest son of the historian William Mitford.)

== Fate ==
She departed Woolwich on 26 December 1803 for a routine patrol in the North Sea. She went missing and was presumed to have foundered with the loss of all hands. It appears that she struck Bell Rock (56°26.052′N 2°23.236′W) in the North Sea off Arbroath, (Note: The Royal Commission on the Ancient and Historical Monuments of Scotland cites Whittaker) and that this was the impetus for the building of the Bell Rock lighthouse three years later. Wreckage was found at Cruden Bay and St Coombs, both in Buchan, Aberdeenshire.
