= HMS Albion (1802) =

Ship launched on 17 June 1802

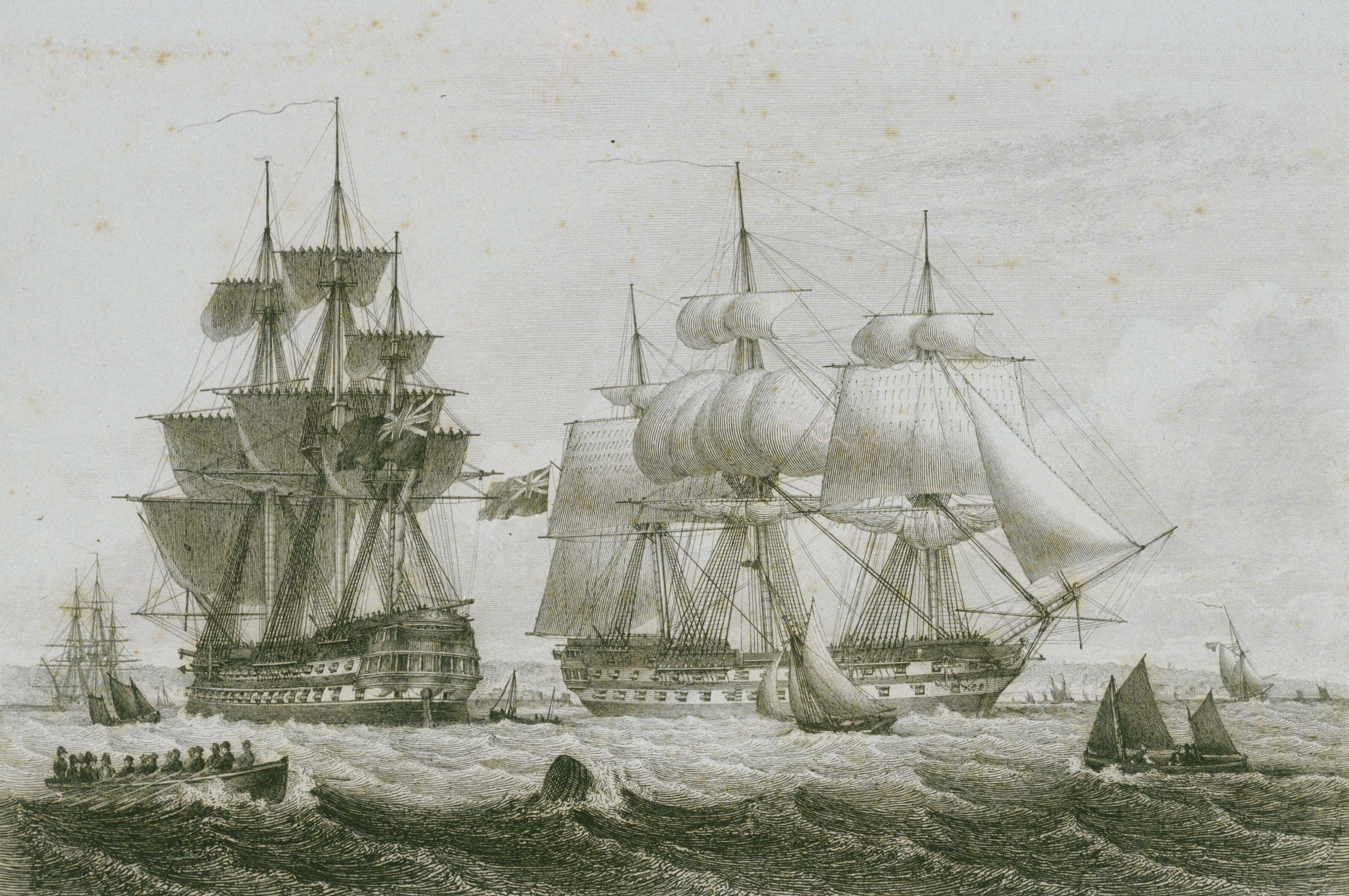
- Albion (right) at Spithead on 31 January 1828

History

United Kingdom
- Name: HMS Albion
- Ordered: 24 June 1800
- Builder: Perry, Wells & Green, Blackwall Yard
- Laid down: June 1800
- Launched: 17 June 1802
- Honours and awards: Naval General Service Medal (NGSM) with clasps; "Algiers"; "Navarino"
- Fate: Broken up, 1836

General characteristics
- Class & type: Fame-class ship of the line
- Tons burthen: 1740 32/94 bm
- Length: 175 ft (53 m) (gundeck)
- Beam: 47 ft 6 in (14.48 m)
- Depth of hold: 20 ft 6 in (6.25 m)
- Propulsion: Sails
- Sail plan: Full-rigged ship
- Armament: Lower deck: 28 × 32-pounder guns; Upper deck: 28 × 18-pounder guns; QD: 2 × 18-pounder guns + 12 × 32-pounder carronades; Fc: 2 × 18-pounder guns + 2 × 32-pounder carronades; Roundhouse: 6 × 18-pounder carronades

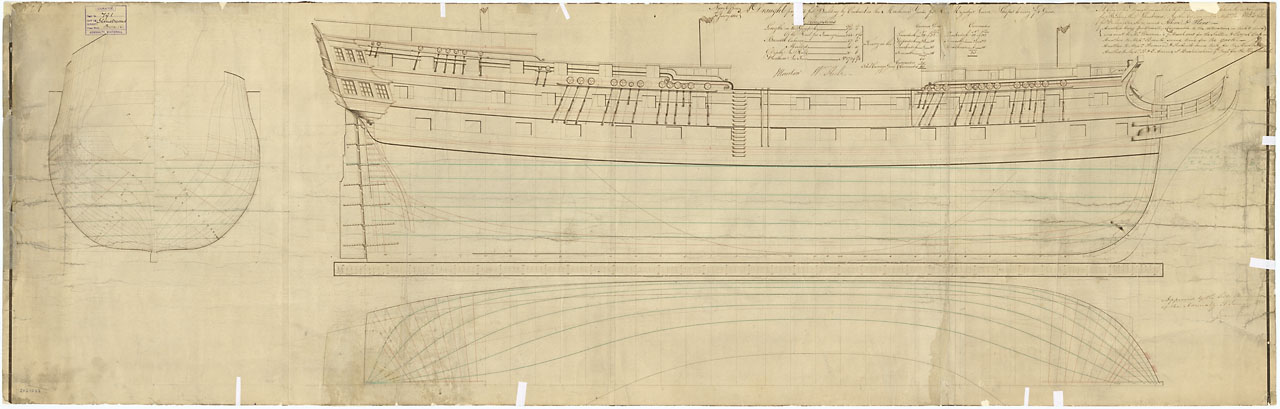
Albion

HMS Albion was a 74-gun third-rate ship of the line of the Royal Navy. She was launched at Perry's Blackwall Yard on the Thames on 17 June 1802. She was broken up at Chatham Dockyard in 1836.

== Napoleonic Wars ==
In May 1803 she was under the command of Captain John Ferrier and joined Admiral Cornwallis' fleet, which was blockading the vital French naval port of Brest. Albion was among the vessels of the squadron that shared in the proceeds of the capture of:

Juffrow Bregtie Kaas (30 May 1803);
Eendraght (31 May);
Morgen Stern (1 June);
Goede ferwachting (4 June);
De Vriede (5 June).

Albion was soon detached from the fleet to deploy to the Indian Ocean where she was to remain for several years.

Albion and Sceptre left Rio de Janeiro on 13 October, escorting Lord Melville, Earl Spencer, Princess Mary, Northampton, Anna, Ann, Glory, and Essex. They were in company with the 74-gun third rate ship of the line HMS Russell, and the fourth rate HMS Grampus. Three days later Albion and Sceptre separated from the rest of the ships.

On 21 December 1803, Albion and Sceptre captured the French privateer Clarisse at 1°18′S 95°20′E in the eastern Indian Ocean. Clarisse was armed with 12 guns and had a crew of 157 men. She had sailed from Isle de France (Mauritius) on 24 November with provisions for a six-month cruise to the Bay of Bengal. At the time of her capture she had not captured anything. Albion, Sceptre, and Clarisse arrived at Madras on 8 January 1804.

On 28 February 1804, Albion and Sceptre met up in the straits of Malacca with the fleet of Indiamen that had just emerged from the Battle of Pulo Aura and conducted them safely to Saint Helena. From there HMS Plantagenet escorted the convoy to England.

On 28 August 1808, Albion recaptured Swallow, which was carrying among other things, a quantity of gold dust.

Next, Albion escorted a fleet of nine East Indiamen returning to Britain. They left Madras on 25 October, but a gale that commenced around 20 November at 10°S 90°E by 22 November had dispersed the fleet. By 21 February three of the Indiamen —Lord Nelson, Glory, and Experiment— had not arrived at Cape Town. Apparently all three had foundered without a trace.

Caroline, of Riga, arrived at Yarmouth on 17 August 1810 having been detained by Albion.

== War of 1812 ==
In 1814, the year that Napoleon was finally toppled, and after a long period under extensive repair, she became flagship of Rear Admiral George Cockburn, taking part in a war (War of 1812) against the United States — a duty that the first Albion had once undertaken. In the summer of 1814, she was involved in the force that harried the coastline of Chesapeake Bay, where she operated all the way up to the Potomac and Patuxent Rivers, destroying large amounts of American shipping, as well as US government property. The operations ended once peace was declared in 1815.

Albion returned, arriving at Portsmouth on 5 May 1815. After disembarking a battalion of Royal Marines on 11 May, she came into the harbour on 13 May, to be docked.

== Post-war ==
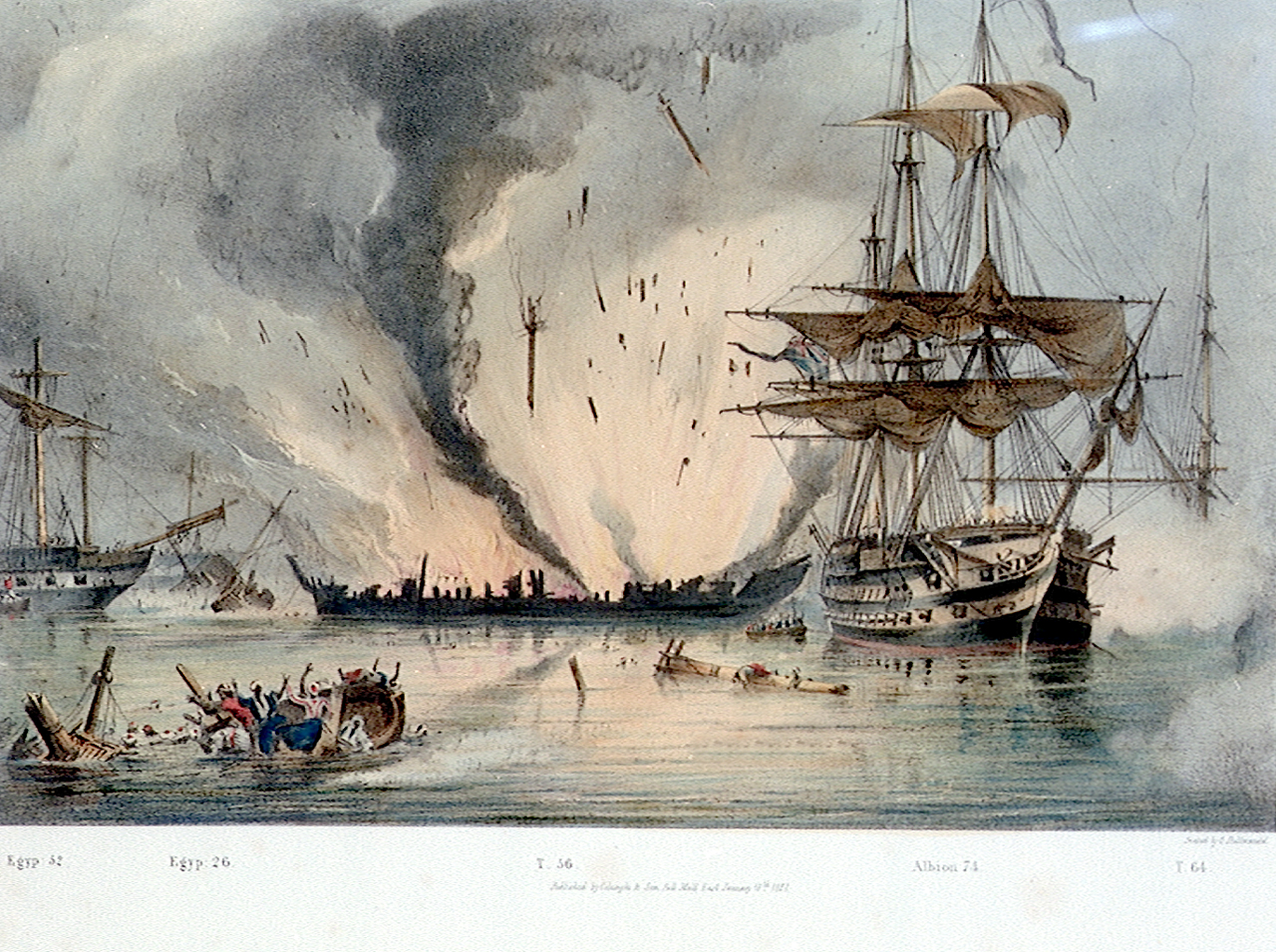
Albion, with a Turkish vessel exploding at the Battle of Navarino, drawn by George Philip Reinagle on HMS Mosquito

Just a year later, Albion was part of a combined British-Dutch fleet taking part in the bombardment of Algiers on 27 August 1816, which was intended to force the Dey of Algiers to free Christian slaves. She fired 4,110 shots at the city, and suffered 3 killed and 15 wounded by return fire. In 1827, she was part of a combined British-French-Russian fleet under the command of Admiral Codrington at the Battle of Navarino, where a Turkish-Egyptian fleet was obliterated, securing Greek independence. Albion suffered 10 killed and 50 wounded, including her second-in-command, Commander John Norman Campbell. In 1847 the Admiralty awarded the Naval General Service Medal with the clasps "Algiers", and "Navarino" to all surviving claimants from the battles.

== Fate ==
Albion was hulked as a quarantine ship in 1831, and finally broken up in 1836.
