= HMS Spy (1804) =

Sloop of the Royal Navy

History

Great Britain
- Name: Comet
- Builder: Topsham
- Launched: 1800
- Fate: Sold June 1804

United Kingdom
- Name: HMS Spy
- Acquired: June 1804 by purchase
- Fate: Sold December 1813

United Kingdom
- Name: Comet
- Acquired: By purchase December 1813
- Fate: Last listed in 1829

General characteristics
- Tons burthen: 254, or 258, or 2745/94, or 275 (bm)
- Length: Overall:97 ft 7 in (29.7 m); Keel:75 ft 3 in (22.9 m)
- Beam: 26 ft 2 in (8.0 m)
- Depth of hold: 10 ft 7 in (3.2 m)
- Sail plan: Ship-sloop
- Complement: 65
- Armament: 14 × 18-pounder carronades + 2 × 9-pounder chase guns

HMS Spy was launched at Topsham in 1800 as the mercantile vessel Comet. The Royal Navy purchased her in 1804 and renamed her HMS Spy. From 1810 she served as store ship. In 1812 she repelled an attack by a French privateer in a single-ship action. The French captured her in 1812 and then released her. The Navy sold her in 1813. Her new owners returned her to mercantile service under the name Comet. She was last listed in 1829.

== Merchantman ==
Comet entered Lloyd's Register in 1800 with E. Tate, master, Lyall, owner, and trade London–Trinidad. It gave her burden as 258 tons. This information continued unchanged until the Royal Navy purchased Comet.

== Royal Navy service ==
The Navy purchased Comet in June 1804 and had Barnard in Deptford fit her in May–June. Between 12 June and 9 August she was at Deptford Dockyard undergoing further fitting. Also in June, Commander John Bushby commissioned her for the North Sea. Later that year Commander John Hudson replace Bushby.

In July 1807 Spy was in ordinary at Sheerness. Between September and October 1810 Spy was at Woolwich undergoing fitting as a store ship. She then was under the command of Richard Anderson, master.

Lloyd's List reported on 17 May 1811 that the store ship Spy had arrived at Portsmouth two days earlier after having left Gibraltar on 29 April in a convoy of some 16 vessels under the escort of HMS Wolverine.

On 10 December 1812 Spy repelled an attack by a French privateer schooner of 10 guns and 120 men in an action that lasted 50 minutes.

Lloyd's List reported on 5 January 1813 that the store ship Spy had come into Cork. The French frigate Gloire had captured Spy on the 20th and released her the same day. Gloire had disarmed Spy and then sent her into England as a cartel. Spy arrived at Plymouth on 16 January. She was transporting from Halifax part of the crew of HMS Guerriere.

The Royal Navy sold Spy at Deptford in December 1813.

== Comet again ==
Comet, of 275 tons (bm), British built, reappeared in Lloyd's Register in 1814 with Wilcocson, master, Parker & Co., owner, and trade London–Quebec. The 1815 volume changed her origin to N. Shoreham, and her burthen to 254 tons. She made voyages to Bermuda and Montreal as well.

Year	Master	Owner	Trade	Source
1820	Wilcokson	Parker	London–Quebec	Register of Shipping
1825	Wilcokson	W. Parker	Liverpool–Virginia	Register of Shipping
1829	Wilcokson	W. Parker	Liverpool–Virginia	Register of Shipping

== Fate ==
Comet was last listed in 1829.
