= John Bull (1798 ship) =

French ship

History

Great Britain
- Name: John Bull
- Namesake: John Bull
- Owner: M'Dowal & Twemlow (1802)
- Acquired: By purchase of a French vessel captured 1798
- Fate: Wrecked c. June 1802

General characteristics
- Tons burthen: 203 (bm)
- Sail plan: Brig
- Complement: 30, or 21 (slave voyage)
- Armament: 1798: 12 × 36&6-pounder guns; 1801: 12 × 9-pounder guns + 2 × 42-pounder carronades

John Bull was a French prize captured in 1798 that was lost on a slave trading voyage in 1802.

== Career ==
She may have been the John Bull of 203 tons (bm), that received a letter of marque on 19 May 1798. Her master was Thomas Goodall. He had changed vessels by 1800.

John Bull first appeared in Lloyd's Register (LR) in 1801.

Year	Master	Owner	Trade	Source
1801	P.Bogle	McDowell	Liverpool–Africa	LR
1802	T.Wright	M'Dowell	Liverpool–Africa	Register of Shipping

M'Dowell and Twemlow outfitted John Bull c.1801 as a slaver. Captain Thomas Wright sailed her from England on 24 August 1801 to the Bight of Biafra and Gulf of Guinea islands.

She was wrecked at the Portuguese island of Saint Thomas's (probably São Tomé and Príncipe) around June 1802. The Register of Shipping for 1802 carried the annotation that she was "lost". (Note: She had been out an estimated 194 days, and was one of only 12 British slave vessels lost in 1802.)

Captain Hugh Crow sailed Will in November 1801 for Africa from Liverpool. She was delayed for some time at Cape Palmas due to an absence of wind. After collecting a cargo of slaves at Bonny, Crow sailed for Saint Thomas to resupply. There Crow found Wright, his crew, and slaves from John Bull. Crow took them aboard, including some 60 slaves. Disease broke out among the rescued men and after Crow landed them some time later at Barbados, most died.
