= Hugh Crow =

British privateer and slave trader (1765–1829)

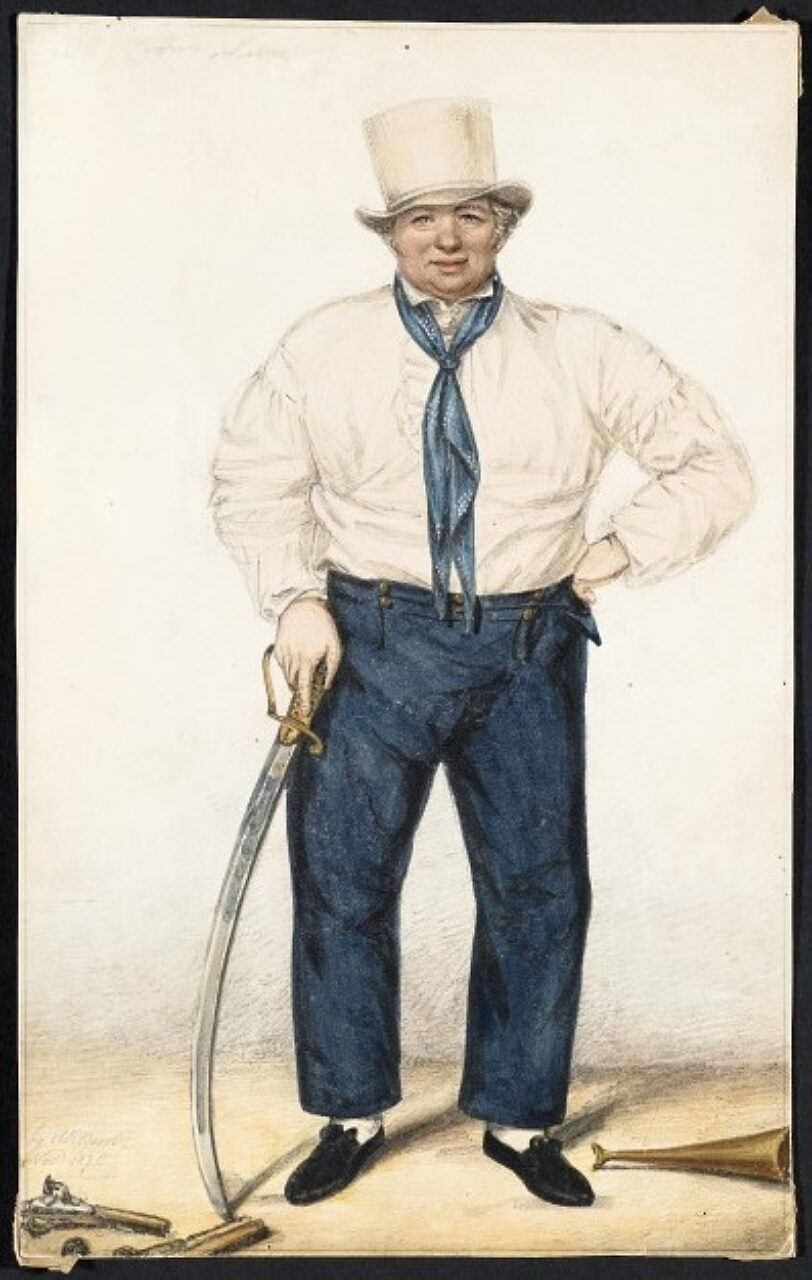
- Portrait by A. R. Burt, 1820
- Born: c. 1765; Ramsey, Isle of Man
- Died: 13 May 1829; Liverpool, England
- Known for: Memoirs of the Late Captain Hugh Crow of Liverpool

Captain Hugh Crow (c. 1765 – 13 May 1829) was a British privateer and slave trader. He was captain of several merchant vessels in the African trade; and his Memoirs, posthumously published, are notable for their descriptions of the west coast of Africa.

== Life ==
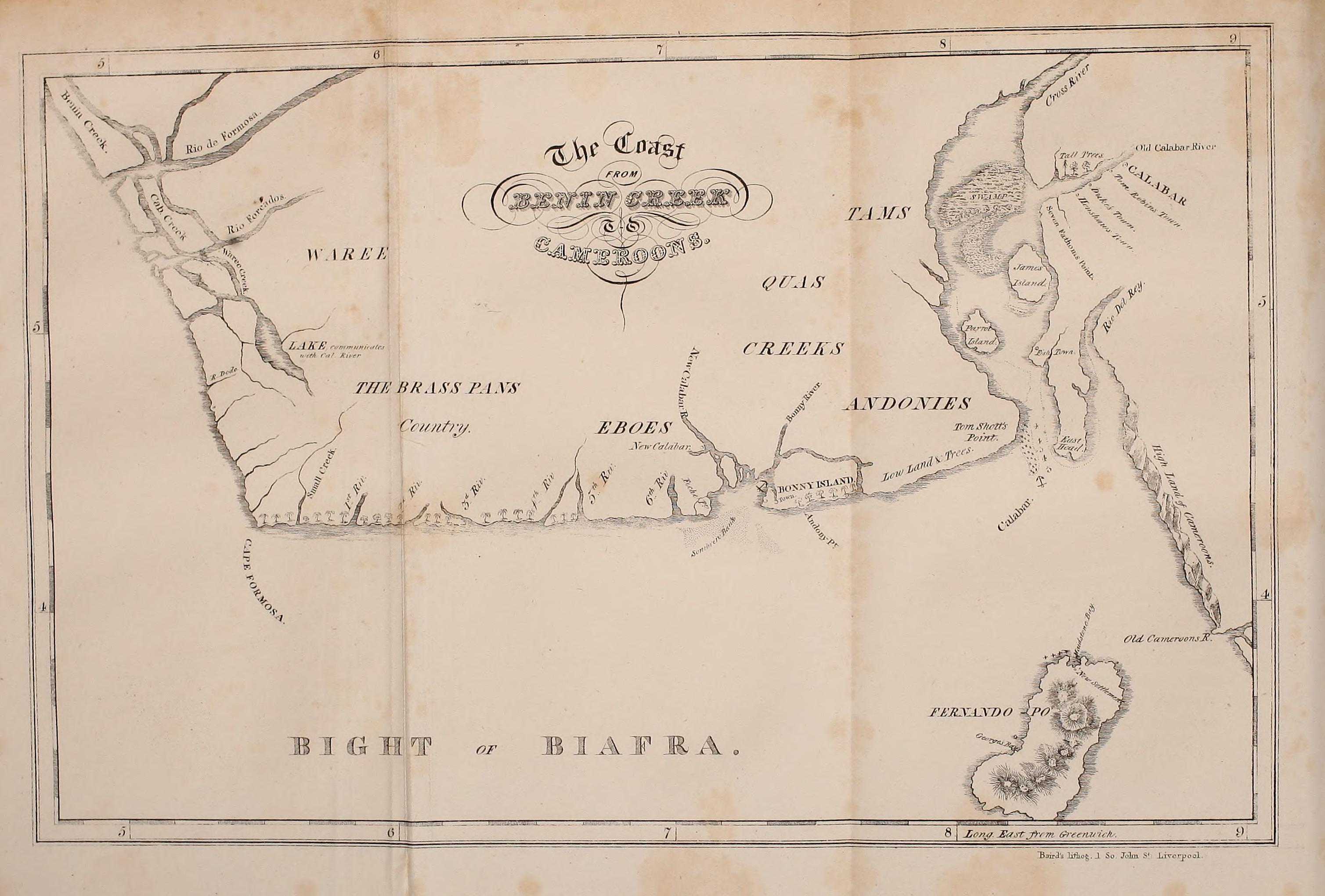
The Coast from Benin Creek to Cameroons, 1830

Hugh Crow was born at Ramsey in the Isle of Man in about 1765, the son of the tradesman Edmund Crow (1730–1809) by his wife, Judith (1737–1807). He lost his right eye in infancy, but despite this handicap was apprenticed to a boat builder and adopted a seafaring life. He became captain of a merchant vessel, and was long engaged in the African trade. In 1808 he retired from active service, and resided for some years in his native town, but in 1817 he fixed his residence in Liverpool, where he died on 13 May 1829.

== Works ==
His Memoirs, published at London in 1830, 8vo, with his portrait prefixed, contain descriptions of the west coast of Africa, particularly the Kingdom of Bonny, and of the manners and customs of the inhabitants.

== Popular culture ==
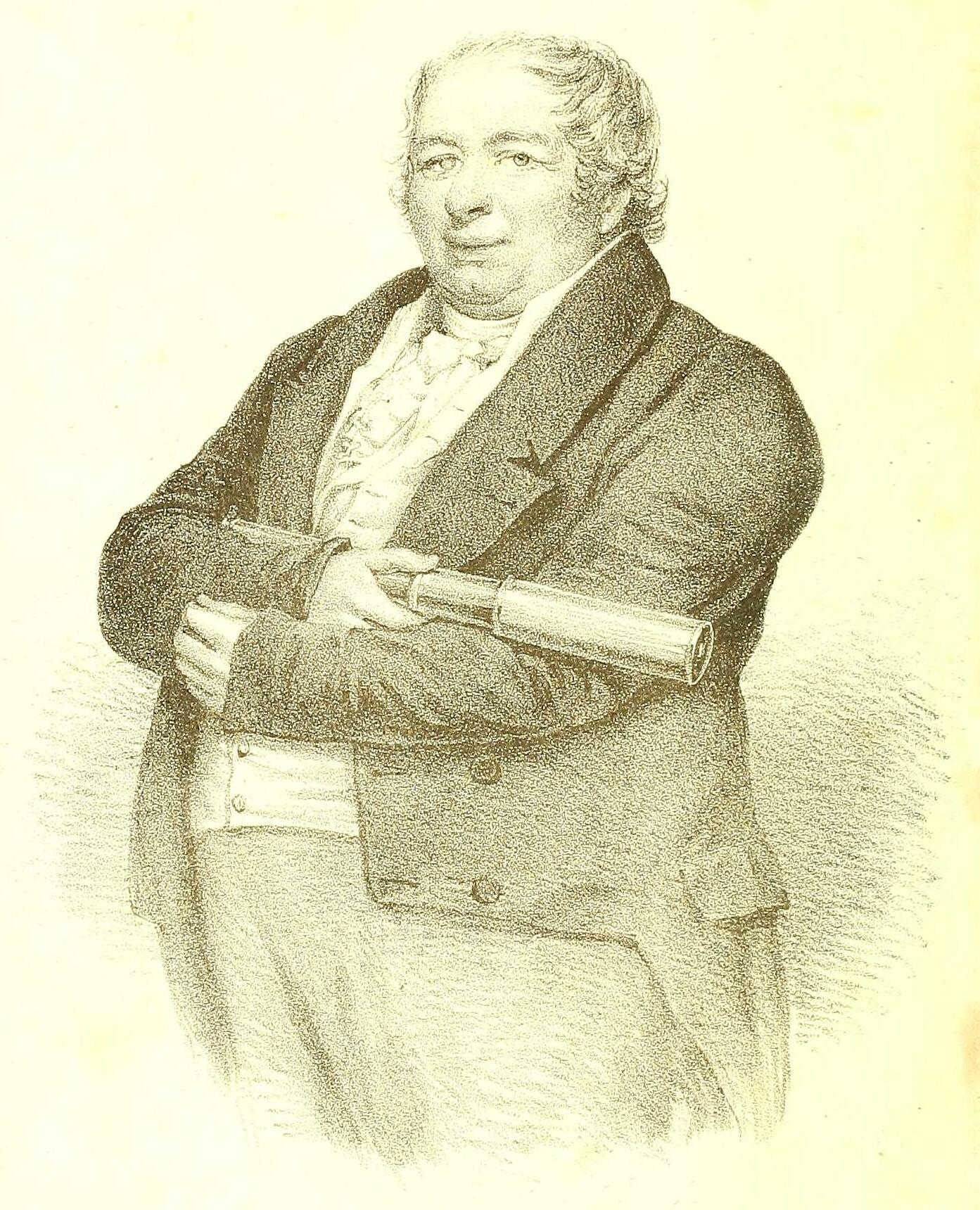
Lithographic portrait and signature, printed with Crow's Memoirs, 1830

In the mid-1970s, the Manx screenwriter Nigel Kneale made his only attempt at writing a stage play; called Crow, it was based upon the memoirs of Hugh Crow. Kneale was unable to find backing to produce the play for the stage, but sold the script to ATV who put it into pre-production for television. Shortly before filming it was cancelled by ATV's managing director, Lew Grade, and Kneale was never told why.

== Gallery ==
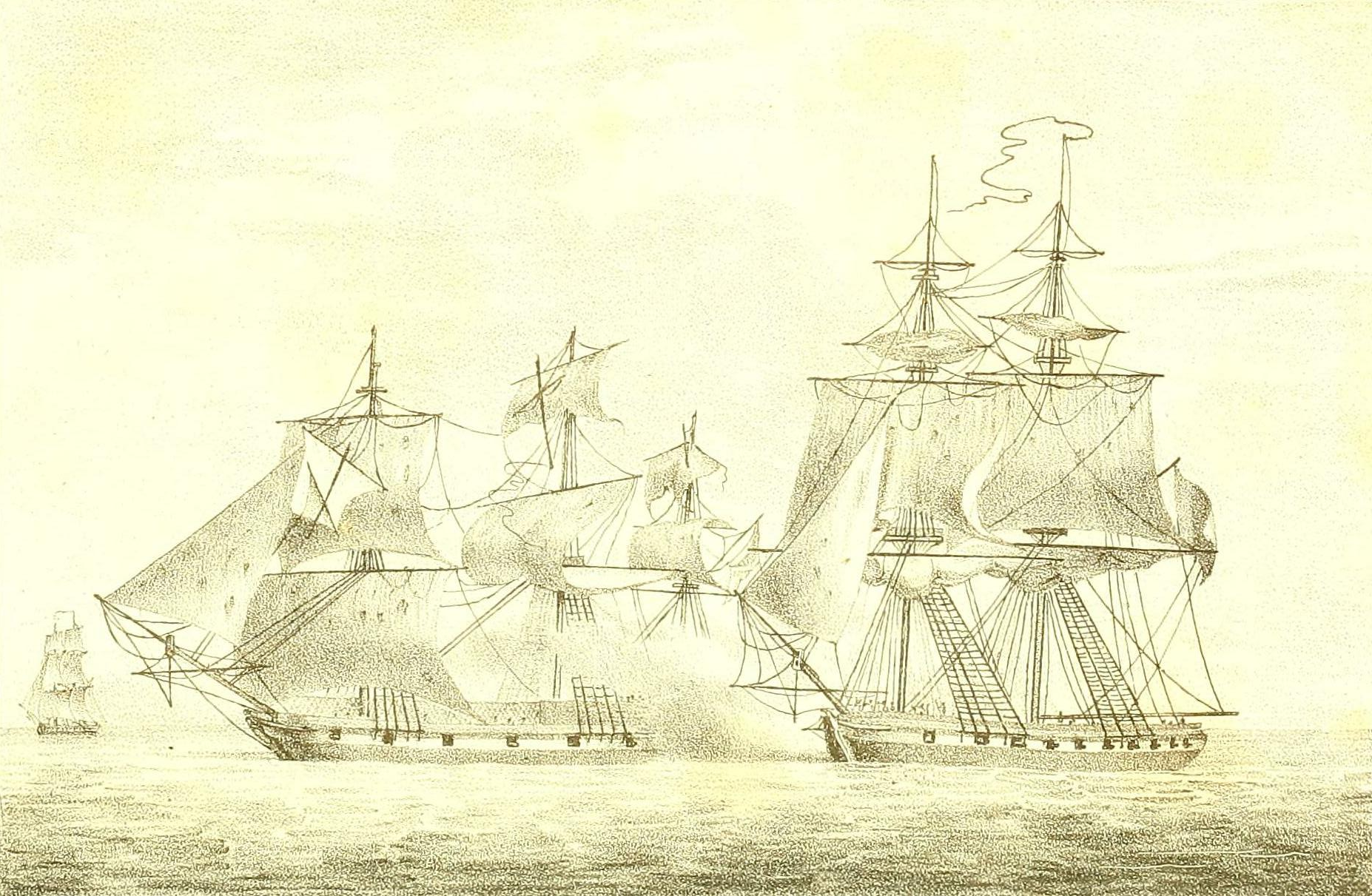
The Will, of Liverpool, Capt. Crow, beating off a French Privateer, 21 February 1800

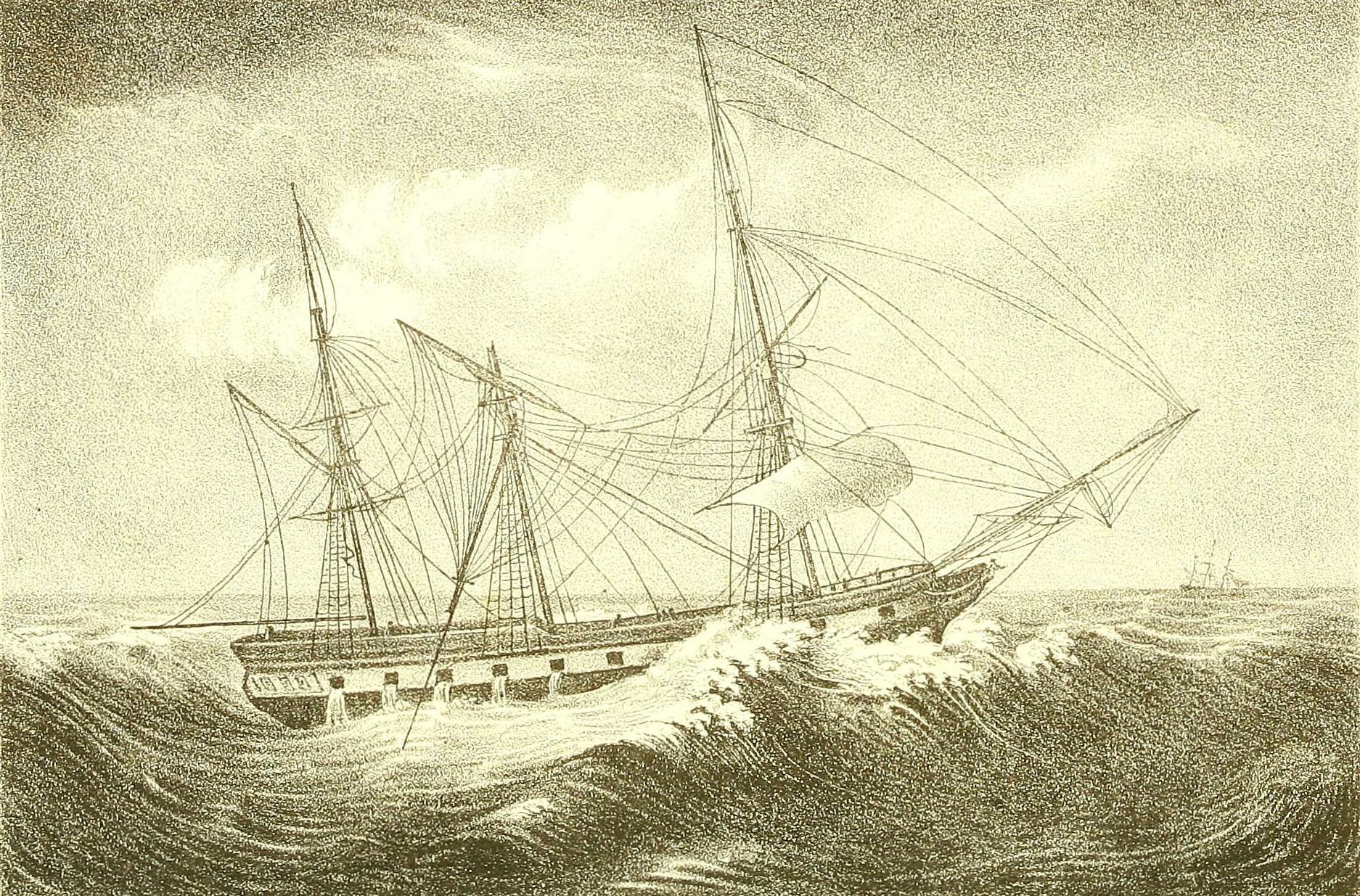
Storm encountered in the Ceres, Capt. Crow, on the passage from Dominica to Liverpool, 1804

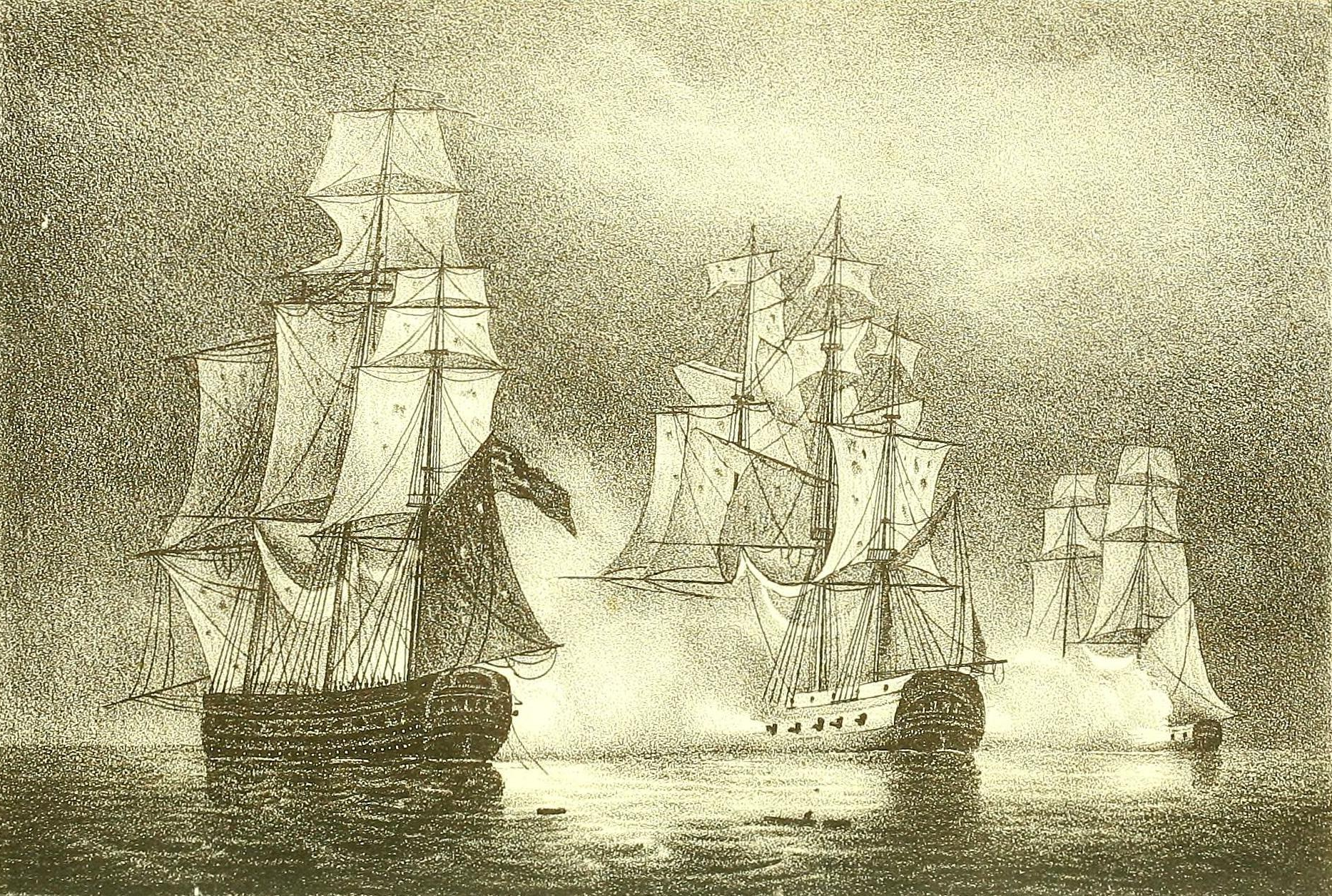
Action, in the night, between the Mary, of Liverpool, Capt. Crow, and Two British Men of War, December 1806

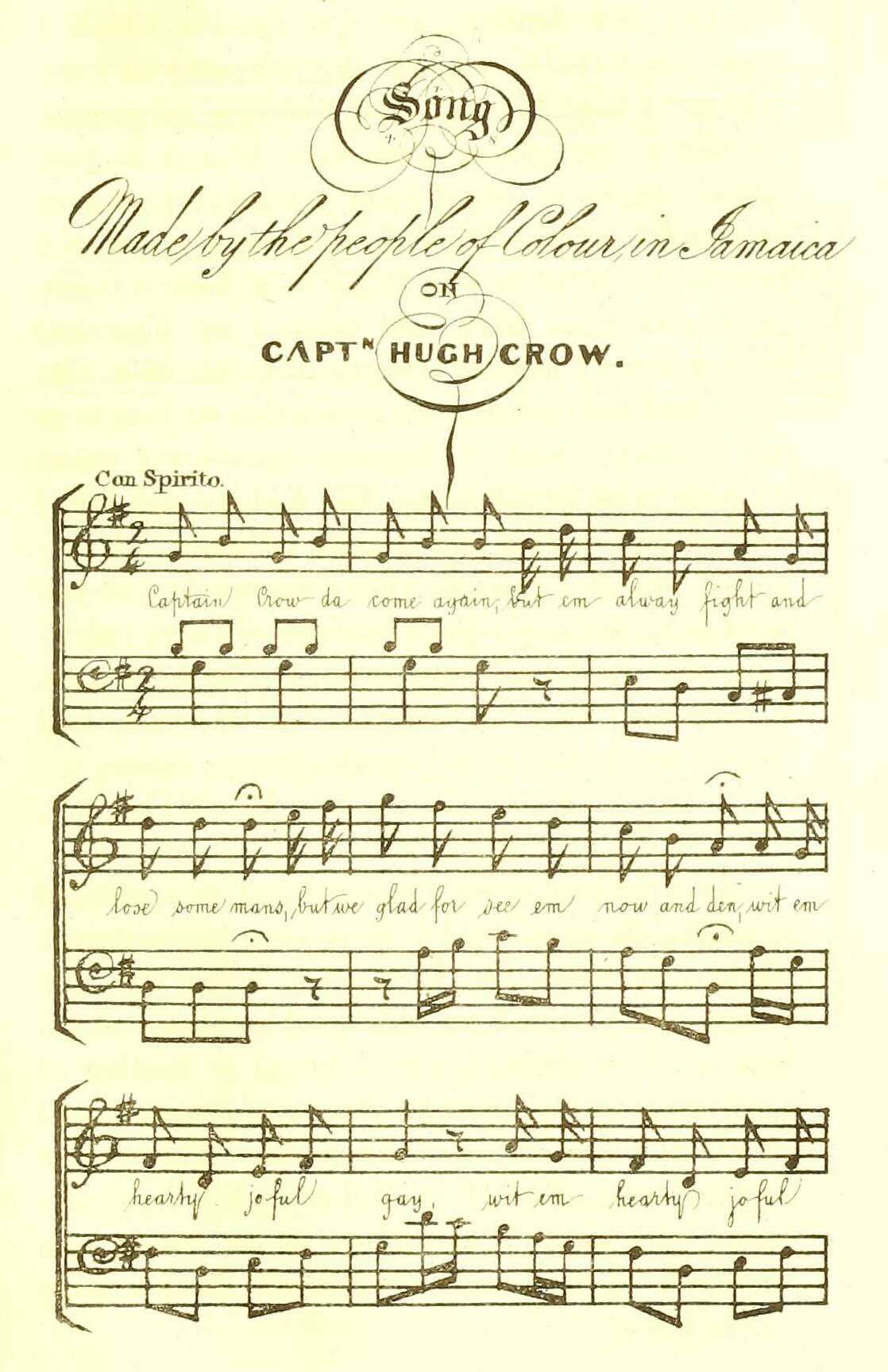
Song. Made by the people of Colour, in Jamaica on Captn Hugh Crow (a)

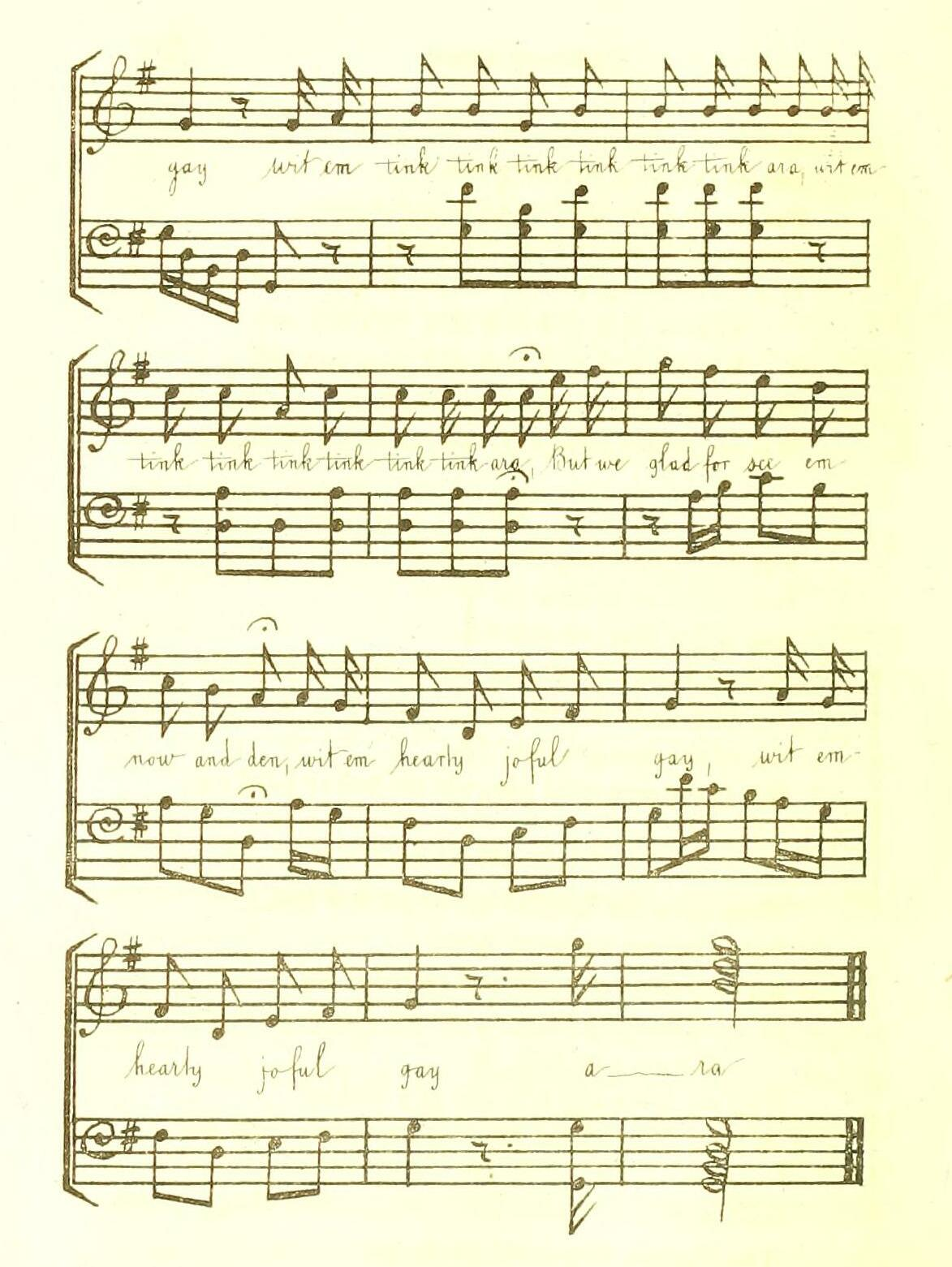
Song. Made by the people of Colour, in Jamaica on Captn Hugh Crow (b)

== See also ==
- Bell (1788 ship)
- HMS Dart (1796)
- John Bull (1798 ship)
- Kitty's Amelia (1803 ship)
- Mary (1806 ship)
- Prince (1785 ship)
- Will (1797 ship)
- HMS Wolverine (1805)
- HMS York (1796)

== Sources ==
- Baigent, Elizabeth (2007). "Crow, Hugh (1765–1829), privateer and slave trader". Oxford Dictionary of National Biography (online ed.). Oxford University Press. doi:10.1093/ref:odnb/6818. (Subscription, Wikipedia Library access or UK public library membership required.)
- Kibble-White, Jack (November 2003). "The Magic Word Here is Paradox". Off the Telly. Retrieved 8 October 2022.

Attribution:

- This article incorporates text from a publication now in the public domain: Cooper, Thompson (1888). "Crow, Hugh". In Stephen, Leslie (ed.). Dictionary of National Biography. Vol. 13. London: Smith, Elder & Co. p. 236.
