= John Ferrier =

Royal Navy Admiral of the Blue (c. 1759–1836)

Admiral John Ferrier
- Born: c. 1759
- Died: 27 January 1836; London, England
- Military career
- Allegiance: United Kingdom of Great Britain and Ireland
- Branch: Royal Navy
- Rank: Admiral of the Blue
- Commands: HMS Brazen; HMS York; HMS Albion
- Conflicts: American Revolutionary War; French Revolutionary Wars; Napoleonic Wars

Admiral of the Blue John Ferrier (c. 1759 – 27 January 1836) was a Royal Navy officer who served during the American War of Independence and the French Revolutionary and Napoleonic Wars.

Ferrier was serving as a lieutenant during the American War of Independence, and was promoted to his first command after the conflict, a small cutter. He was advanced to post-captain shortly before the outbreak of the French Revolutionary Wars, but did not receive a ship for several years. Finally given the 64-gun HMS York in 1796, he was sent to the West Indies, where he spent five years before returning with a convoy of merchants and the thanks of the West Indian merchants. He then served under Horatio Nelson in the Channel during the blockade and raids on Boulogne, and then in the North Sea, receiving Nelson's praise for his service.

With the outbreak of the Napoleonic Wars Ferrier was active in the Channel in command of a 74-gun ship, before being sent to the East Indies. He helped to escort a valuable convoy of East Indiamen, which had narrowly escaped from a French squadron, and spent four years on the station, frustrating French ambitions in the Persian Gulf and surviving an arduous voyage back to England through gales and aboard a leaky ship. Promoted to flag-rank in 1810 he was given an assignment with the fleet in the North Sea, flying his flag on a number of ships, before retiring ashore after the wars. He settled at Deal, Kent, and was a frequent visitor to the Duke of Wellington's residence, Walmer Castle, having made friends of the Duke and naval officers like Admiral Lord Exmouth during his career. He was promoted to the rank of Admiral of the Blue, and died in London in 1836, two days after an operation to relieve an internal complaint.

== Early life ==
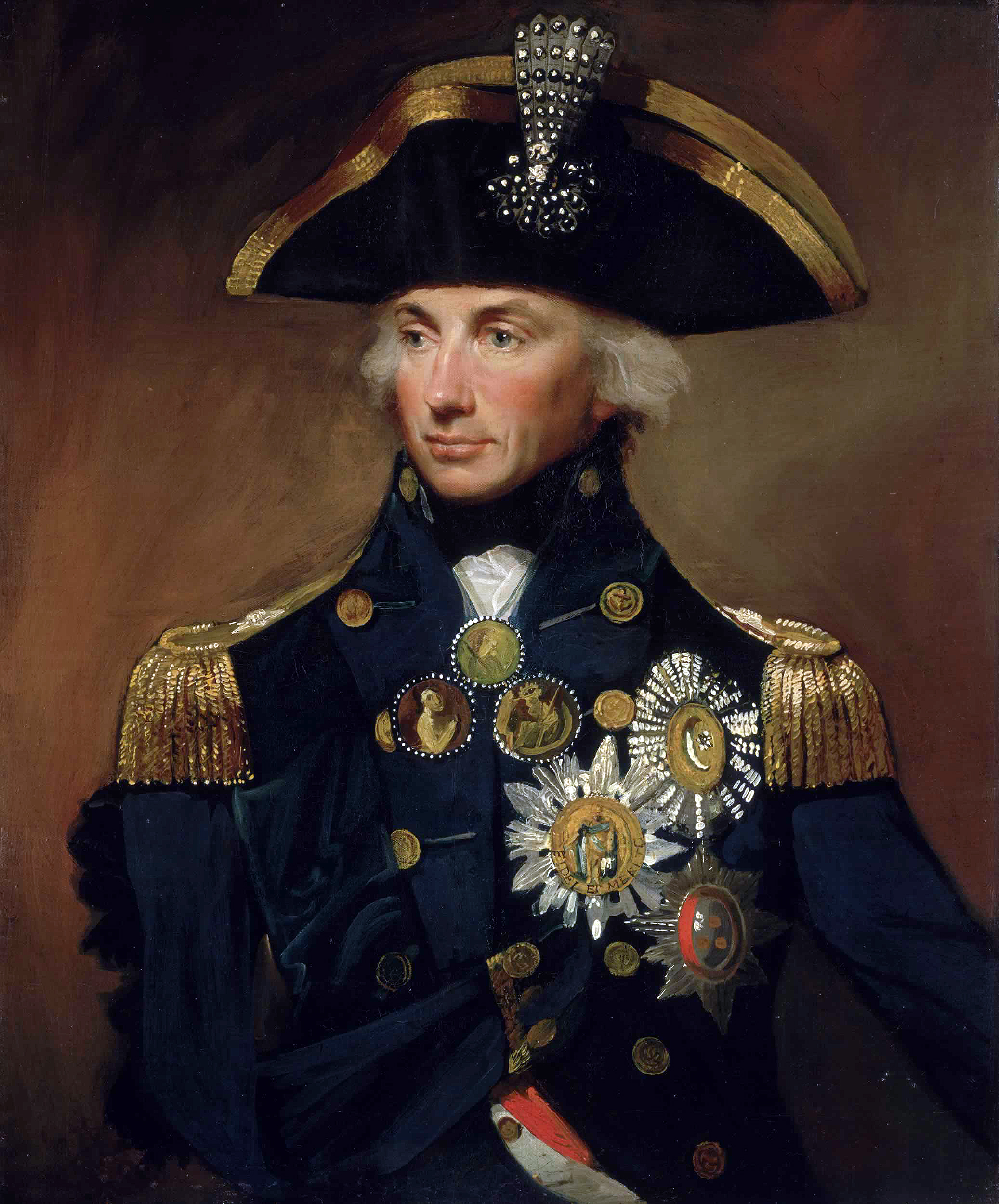
Horatio Nelson, 1800, by Lemuel Francis Abbott. Ferrier served under Nelson, who approvingly noted that Ferrier was "as steady as old Time himself."

Details of Ferrier's early life are obscure, but he is thought to have been baptised John Lellesden Ferrier at St Peter's Church, Sandwich, Kent on 11 February 1759, son of Samuel and Jane Ferrier. He was buried at St Peter's Sandwich on 3 February 1836. The burial register records that he had been living at Deal in Kent and that he had been Admiral of the Blue. He is known to have received his commission as lieutenant in 1777, during the American War of Independence, and to have served aboard the 32-gun HMS Convert under Captain Henry Harvey. He is recorded as having commissioned the cutter HMS Brazen in August 1786 for service in the North Sea, and was promoted to post-captain on 22 November 1790. The outbreak of the French Revolutionary Wars in 1792 did not immediately lead to further service for Ferrier, and it was not until 1796 that he received a ship, being appointed to command the 64-gun HMS York in April that year. He commanded her for five years on the West Indies Station, before sailing back to Britain as a convoy escort for 155 merchants, all of which reached their destination safely. For his service he was rewarded with the thanks of the West Indian merchants, and a piece of plate.

He then served in British waters as part of the squadron under Rear-Admiral Horatio Nelson during the blockade and raids on Boulogne in 1801, and during Nelson's planning for an assault on Flushing in the autumn of that year. Nelson was pleased with Ferrier's services during this time, mentioning him in a letter to Earl St Vincent, "Captain Ferrier you do not know, therefore it becomes me to tell you, that his ship is in the very first order, and that he is a man of sense, and as steady as old Time himself; I am much pleased with his regularity and punctuality."

== Napoleonic Wars ==
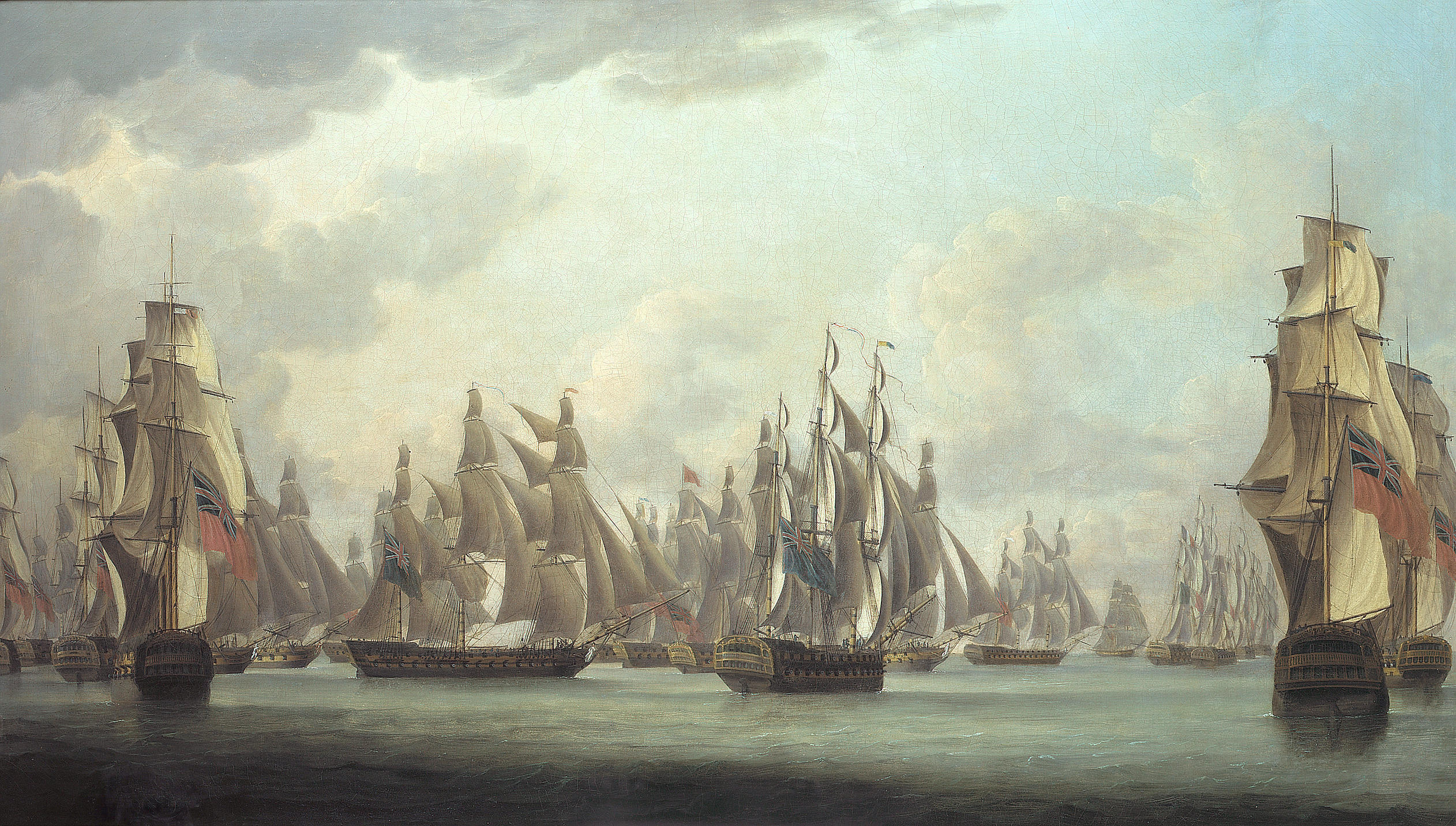
The Battle of Pulo Aura, the brief engagement Commodore Nathaniel Dance's convoy had just fought when Ferrier's ship arrived.

York was paid off and in February 1802 Ferrier received an appointment to command the 74-gun HMS Albion. There was no immediate service available after the signing of the Treaty of Amiens later that year, but on the outbreak of the Napoleonic Wars in 1803, Albion became the flagship of Rear-Admiral Sir James Saumarez on the Channel station. The squadron patrolled the Channel against French raiders, and on 28 May 1803 she captured the 40-gun French frigate Franchise while in company with the 74-gun ships HMS Minotaur and HMS Thunderer. Albion was then ordered to the West Indies where on 21 December she captured the 12-gun privateer Clarisse. Ferrier then sailed for the East Indies, encountering a homeward-bound fleet of East Indiamen in February 1804, in the Strait of Malacca. The fleet, under Commodore Nathaniel Dance, had narrowly escaped capture by a powerful French squadron under Rear-Admiral Charles-Alexandre Léon Durand Linois. Despite the massive French superiority Dance had successfully defended his convoy and by leading Linois to think that some of his merchants were actually warships, drove away the French at the Battle of Pulo Aura. Proceeding through the strait, Dance and his convoy came across Ferrier in HMS Albion, and accompanied by the 74-gun HMS Sceptre, and were escorted as far as Saint Helena. They arrived safely there on 9 June 1804.

On another occasion, having been ordered back to England, Ferrier learnt that the French were attempting to establish themselves in the Persian Gulf with two ships of the line, four frigates and a number of armed vessels. He sailed to the Gulf at once to frustrate their aims, actions which earned him the thanks of the colonial Indian government. Ferrier then made the return voyage to England aboard the Albion in 1808 with a convoy of merchants, in which he "encountered the severest of weather", a concern as the Albion was reportedly a "very defective ship". Ferrier and his crew survived the arduous voyage, eventually reaching the Cape, where the commanding officer there, Vice-Admiral Albemarle Bertie noted that Albion was "a perfect wreck". He reported that

She has lost her mizzen mast and topmast; nineteen of her main deck guns are thrown overboard also; and the ship so leaky and opening so much that she required to be frapped together in three places. Captain Ferrier's verbal information was that if the gale continued a few hours longer, Albion must have foundered.

Albion was lucky, several of her convoy were not so fortunate. Of the nine East Indiamen that had originally formed the convoy, three, Glory, Experiment and Lord Nelson, disappeared in the gales.

While refitting at the Cape, Ferrier, as the senior officer on the station, presided over the court-martial of several mutineers aboard the recently arrived HMS Nereide, commanded by Captain Robert Corbet.^{[a]} The day after the trial, Corbet himself was court-martialled on various charges brought by his crew, but was acquitted of most of them and allowed to retain command of his ship. Ferrier then left the Cape to continue his voyage, and on arriving in England Albion was "found by an official survey, to be literally lashed together; and when her excessive defects were ascertained, it excited the astonishment and admiration of everyone who had an opportunity of examining the means Capt. Ferrier employed to enable his ship to withstand the tremendous gales of wind encountered during the voyage."

== Flag rank and later life ==
Ferrier was promoted to rear-admiral on 31 July 1810 and hoisted his flag aboard the 74-gun HMS Marlborough, and later in 1811 aboard the 74-gun HMS Defiance, both in the North Sea fleet during the blockades of the Dutch coast. He moved from Defiance to the 74-gun HMS Bellerophon, and finally to the 74-gun HMS Scarborough in 1813, serving under Admiral William Young off Flushing.

Ferrier does not appear to have had any seagoing service after the Napoleonic Wars ended in 1815, and having been made a vice-admiral on 4 June 1814, settled ashore at Deal, Kent. His obituary recorded that his public character "evinced great punctuality, naval skill, fortitude, resolution, and a steady perseverance, and to a degree which drew forth the admiration of all those with whom he served." He was a good friend of Admiral Lord Exmouth, and the Duke of Wellington, whom he had met while serving in India. Ferrier was a frequent visitor to the Duke's residence at Walmer Castle, close to his home at Deal. His private life was remarked to be "most unassuming and unostentatious, influenced in all his actions by the very highest sense of honour, and he secretly exercised many acts of bounty and munificence." He was promoted to the rank of admiral of the blue, but having been suffering for some time from an internal complaint, was advised to undergo an operation. He travelled to London in late January 1836, and the operation was performed there on 25 January. There were complications, and the admiral died two days later, on 27 January at the age of 77. He had married late in life, his wife surviving him.

== Notes ==
a. Corbet was a notorious disciplinarian, whose actions provoked dissent amongst his men on a number of occasions. Ten men were convicted of the charge of mutiny and received death sentences. Nine were recommended for mercy.
