= Will (1797 ship) =

British enslaving ship 1797–1806

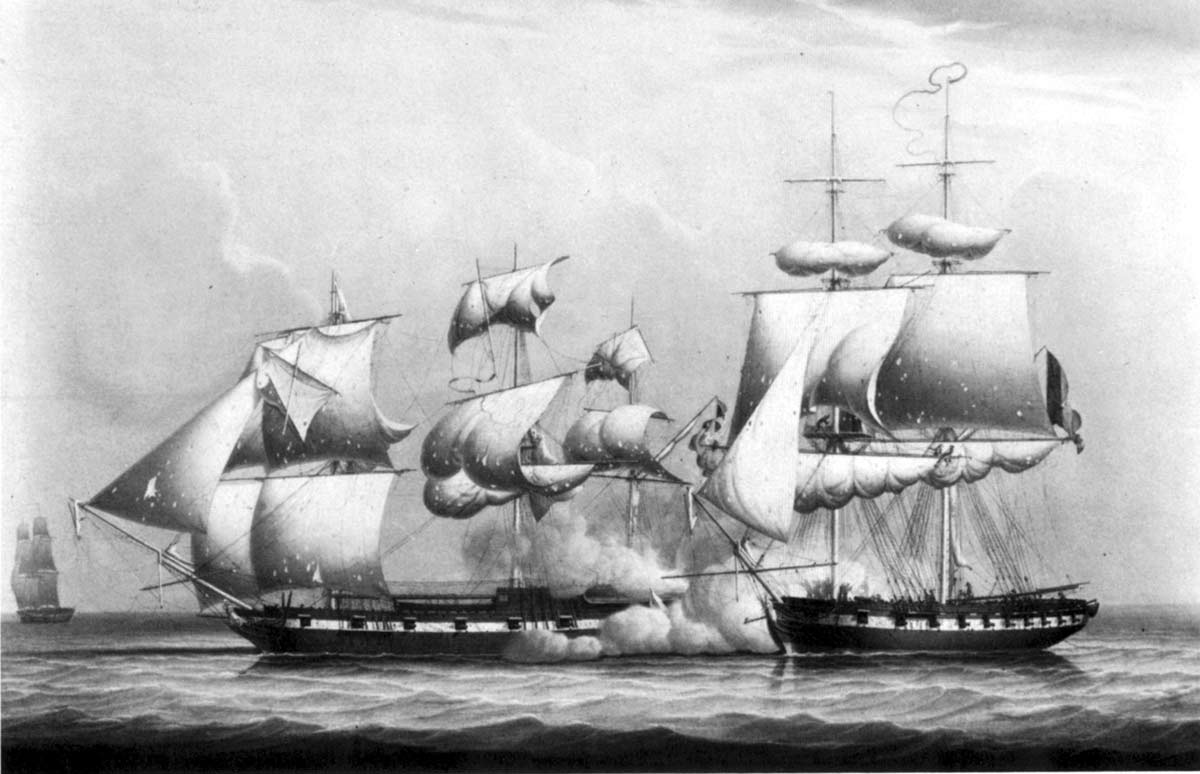
- "Action between the Will, of Liverpool, and a French privateer, on 21 February 1804" (sic ?), by Robert Salmon

History

Great Britain
- Name: Will
- Owner: Aspinal & Co. (Note: Originally William Aspinal. Later, William, together with James Tobin.)
- Builder: Liverpool
- Launched: 1797
- Fate: Foundered July 1806; disappears from Lloyd's Register after 1807.

General characteristics
- Tons burthen: 286 (bm)
- Sail plan: Full-rigged ship
- Complement: 1797:40; 1800:35; 1804:40
- Armament: 1797:18 × 6&12-pounder cannons; 1800:18 × 6&12-pounder cannons; 1804:16 × 6-pounder guns + 2 × 12-pounder carronades; 1806:2 × 9-pounder + 16 × 6-pounder guns

Will was a ship launched at Liverpool in 1797, for Aspinal & Co., who were one of Liverpool's leading slave-trading companies. She made numerous voyages between West Africa and the Caribbean in the triangular trade in enslaved people, during which she several times successfully repelled attacks by French privateers. Will apparently foundered in a squall in July 1806, shortly before the passage of the Slave Trade Act 1807 abolished the slave trade for British citizens.

== Career ==
1st voyage transporting enslaved people (1797–1798): Captain James Locke received a letter of marque for Will on 4 July 1797. Will, James Lake, master, sailed from Liverpool on 18 July 1797. In 1797, 104 vessels sailed from England, bound for Africa to acquire and transport enslaved people; 90 of these vessels sailed from Liverpool.

Will arrived off Africa on 15 September. She acquired captives at Bonny and sailed for Jamaica on 24 October. She arrived at Kingston on 29 December. She had embarked 420 captives and disembarked 415, for a mortality rate of 1%. Will left Kingston on 18 February 1798, and arrived back at Liverpool on 15 April. Two of her 39 crew members had died during the overall voyage. (Note: On 2 August 1799, Lake was captain on Trelawney off Cabinda when captives succeeded in taking over the vessel. However, with the assistance of a nearby ship the revolt was put down after a 90-minute battle.)

After the passage of Dolben's Act in 1788, masters received a bonus of £100 for a mortality rate of under 2%; the ship's surgeon received £50. For a mortality rate between two and three per cent, the bonus was halved. There was no bonus if mortality exceeded 3%. (Note: At the time the monthly wage for a captain of a slave ship out of Bristol was £5 per month.) Dolben's Act also limited the number of enslaved people that British enslaving ships could transport without facing penalties, based on the ships' tons burthen. At a burthen of 286 tons, the cap for Will would have been 420 captives. Dolben's Act was the first British legislation passed to regulate slave shipping.

The Lloyd's Register (1798) entry for Will gave her master's name as T. Dodson, changing to H. Crow. Crow made four voyages to the Bight of Biafra and Gulf of Guinea islands, and then to Jamaica, in 1798, 1800, 1801, and 1802.

2nd voyage transporting enslaved people (1798–1799): Will left Liverpool on 30 July 1798, with a crew of 46 men, bound for Angola. In 1798, 160 vessels sailed from England, bound for Africa to acquire and transport enslaved people; 149 of these vessels sailed from Liverpool. This was the largest number of vessels in the period 1795–1804.

Will ended up stopping at Bonny River. Crow had three men die on Will. Will arrived on 29 December, at Kingston, Jamaica, with 420 captives. In Jamaica, Crow lost 31 crew members—10 died, the Royal Navy pressed 15, and six deserted—forcing him to bring on 13 new crew members. Will left Jamaica on 14 February 1799, and arrived in Liverpool on 9 April, with a crew of 23, apparently having lost two more crew members en route.

3rd voyage transporting enslaved people (1799–1800): Will left Liverpool on 25 July 1799, with a crew of 42. In 1799, 156 vessels sailed from England, bound for Africa to acquire and transport enslaved people; 134 of these vessels sailed from Liverpool.

Will again sailed to Bonny. Near Cape Palmas a French privateer schooner fired on Will, but sheered off on meeting resistance. Then after Will had been at Bonny for some three months gathering captives, Hugh Crow's brother Will, captain of Charlotte, brought the intelligence that there were three French frigates in the area. Next day, three frigates and a schooner came up and anchored some four miles away. They then sent their boats to attack Will. However, the tide was at half-ebb and the boats did not push over the Barleur bank, which stood between them and their target. After a two-hour long-range exchange of fire, Will cut her cables and returned to Bonny. There the nine ships in the harbour organized themselves under the command of Captain Latham of Lottery and sallied forth, anchoring in a line about four miles from the French vessels, which after a week gave up and sailed away.

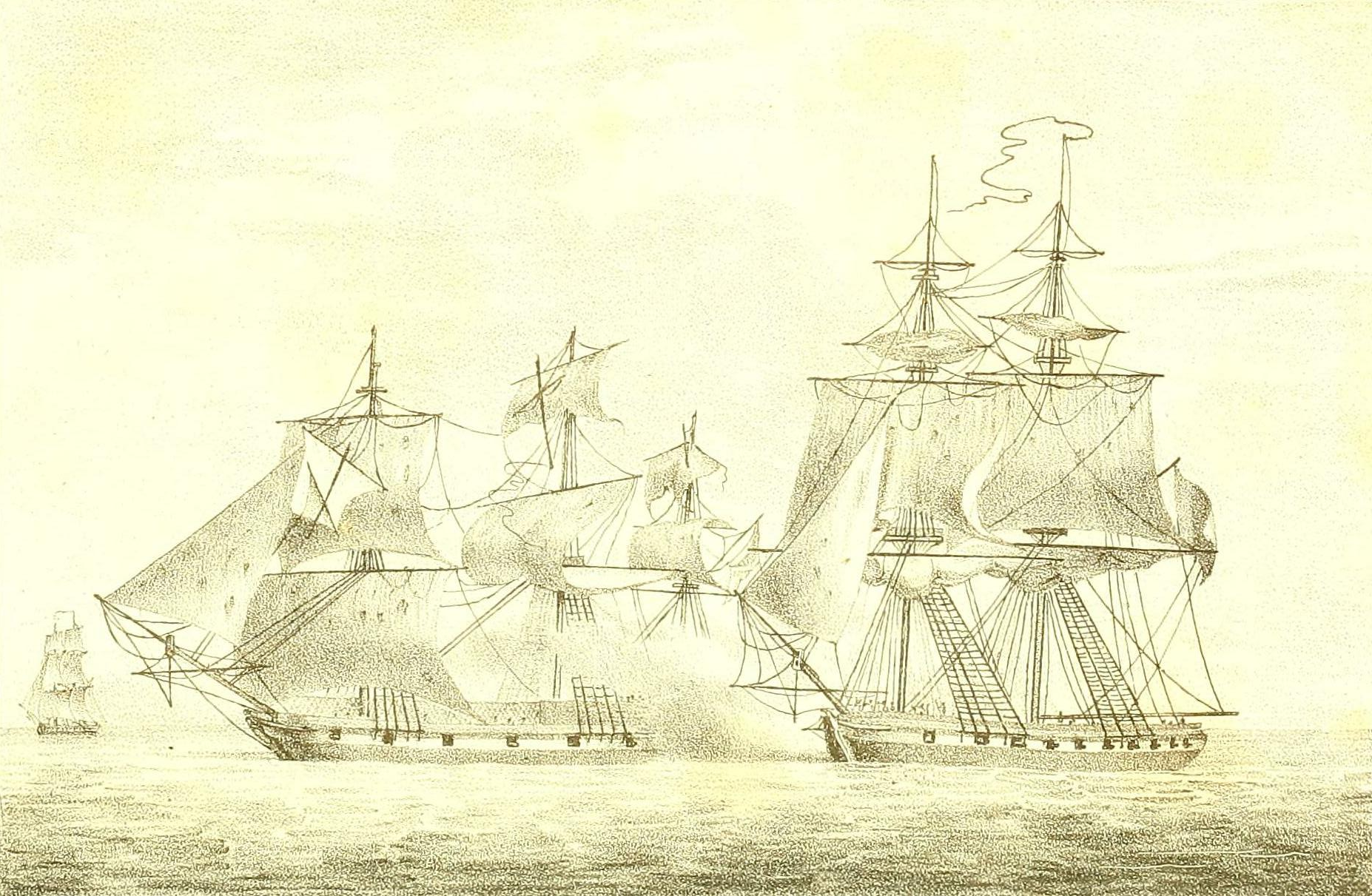
The Will, under Captain Crow, beating off a French Privateer, 21 February 1800

On 2 February 1800, a French privateer attacked Will. Crow fought back, driving the privateer off, though not without suffering casualties and a great deal of damage to Will. In the engagement, Will had three crewmen wounded, two captives killed, and ten captives wounded. Crow estimated that had the French vessel attacked once more he would have been forced to strike. The action apparently took place near Tobago. Crow had trained one captive to be a gunner and found the man to be "both courageous and expert".

Will arrived at Kingston on 7 March, with 405 captives on board. Crow had six crew members die and four desert. When she arrived, boats from eight warships arrived and pressed many of Will's crew. Then on 12 April, during a celebration in honour of Rodney's victory, the crew on board a nearby sloop fired a gun that was still loaded with a double-headed shot. The projectile hit Will's doctor, who had been drinking coffee on the quarterdeck, killing him. Will left for Britain on 19 May. She arrived back at Liverpool on 15 July.

4th voyage transporting enslaved people (1800–1801): Prior to leaving on this, his third voyage, Crowe received a letter of marque on 28 August 1800. Will sailed again on 6 November. In 1800, 133 vessels sailed from England, bound for Africa to acquire and transport enslaved people; 120 of these vessels sailed from Liverpool.

Will did not reach Bonny for almost 10 weeks. There she took on the captain and crew of Diana, which had wrecked. Lloyd's List reported that Diana, of Liverpool, Ward, master, had wrecked on the Bonny Bar, but that the crew was saved, and that Will and Lord Stanley had brought them into Jamaica.

Will reached Jamaica with 293 captives. On 21 May 1801, she left Port Royal in convoy, under the escort of HMS York. Captain John Ferrier, of York, appointed Crow a senior captain of the convoy, and placed Will at the rear of the convoy as "whipper-in". Will encountered Hector, Blackie, master, of Liverpool, which was not part of the convoy but was in a sinking state. Hector capsized before Crow could get her crew off, but he was still able to save all but one man on her, a passenger who drowned as she capsized and went under. Will arrived back at Liverpool on 19 July, having left Liverpool with 42 crew members and having suffered only two crew member deaths in the overall voyage.

After his return to Liverpool, Crow received two pieces of silver. The merchants and underwriters of Liverpool gave him an engraved silver plate worth £200 commemorating him on his feat of driving off three French frigates on 16 December 1799. The Lloyd's underwriters gave him an engraved silver cup commemorating Crow's defeat of the French privateer brig on 21 February 1800.

5th voyage transporting enslaved people (1801–1802): Crow left on his fourth slaving voyage on Will on 11 November 1801. In 1801, 147 vessels sailed from England, bound for Africa to acquire and transport enslaved people; 122 of these vessels sailed from Liverpool.

Will was delayed for some time at Cape Palmas due to an absence of wind. After collecting captives at Bonny, Crow sailed for the Portuguese island of São Tomé to resupply. There one of Will's officers fell overboard and was eaten by sharks before the crew could rescue him. Also, there Crow found the master (Wright), crew, and some captives from the brig John Bull, which had wrecked on the coast of Africa. Crow took them aboard, including some 60 captives. Disease broke out among the rescued men and after Crow landed them some time later at Barbados, most died. Crow then sailed on to Kingston. Crow and Will arrived at Kingston on 30 June 1802, with 294 captives.

Will and Crow arrived back at Liverpool on 23 October 1802, narrowly missing being shipwrecked on the coast of Wales. He had lost seven of his 35-man crew. Aspinal & Co. had Will repaired and laid up, and Crow moved to a new ship, Ceres. (Note: In 1807 Crow made the last legal enslaving voyage from Liverpool, sailing in the ship Kitty's Amelia.)

6th voyage transporting enslaved people (1804–1805): Captain John Brelsford received a letter of marque on 21 June 1804. (Note: Brelsford had been captain of Sarah when he and three other members of her officers and crew were acquitted of the murder of two captives. The stated motive for the charge was Brelsford's need to bring the number of captives he was carrying down to the maximum number that Dolben's Act permitted.)

Brelsford sailed to the Bight of Biafra and Gulf of Guinea islands, and then to Jamaica. Will left Liverpool on 4 July 1804. In 1804, 147 vessels sailed from England, bound for Africa to acquire and transport enslaved people; 126 of these vessels sailed from Liverpool.

Will arrived at Kingston on 15 December, with 262 captives. She left Kingston 21 April 1805, and arrived at Liverpool on 5 July. She had lost one man of her 42 crew.

== Fate ==
7th voyage transporting enslaved people (1805–loss): Will's captain was Thomas Livesley (or Lievesly). He sailed the same circuit as his predecessors, but apparently without a letter of marque. Will left Liverpool on 20 October 1805.

Will arrived at Kingston on 31 March 1806, with 265 captives. She also had lost seven of her 36 crew men. She left Kingston on 19 June.

Lloyd's List reported that Will, of and for Liverpool, had been upset by a squall in July 1806, after leaving Kingston and had foundered. Four crew members had drowned.

In 1806, 33 British enslaving ships were lost. The source for this number does not show any vessels being lost on the homeward leg of their journeys. Absent detailed vessel histories, it is frequently difficult to know if a vessel lost between the West Indies and Britain was a Guineaman, or simply a West Indiaman. Still, during the period 1793 to 1807, war, rather than maritime hazards or resistance by the captives, was the greatest cause of vessel losses among British enslaving vessels.
