= Duke of Montrose (1804 ship) =

British packet and merchant ship (1804–1815)

History

United Kingdom
- Name: Duke of Montrose
- Namesake: Duke of Montrose
- Builder: Falmouth
- Launched: 1804
- Fate: Wrecked April 1815

General characteristics
- Tons burthen: 180 (bm)
- Armament: 12 × 6-pounder guns

Duke of Montrose was a Falmouth packet launched in 1804. She participated in six single-ship actions. During the Napoleonic Wars she captured a French naval schooner but a year or so later a French privateer captured her. She returned to British hands some nine months later. During the War of 1812 she was able to drive off American privateers twice. An American frigate captured her in 1813 but gave her up to her crew, also putting onboard the crews of other vessels the frigate had captured. Then a French frigate also captured her and gave her up after disarming her. She was wrecked at Barbados in 1815.

== Career ==
Duke of Montrose first appeared in Lloyd's Register (LR) in 1813. (Prior to 1813 LR did not carry information on the Falmouth or Harwich packets.) LR showed her with Blewett, master and owner. She had undergone small repairs in 1811.

Duke of Montrose had, of course, been sailing for some time before she appeared in LR. Ship arrival and departures (SAD) data in Lloyd's List and other newspapers carry mentions.

There were also two notable engagements. The first occurred in May 1805. Mutineers had turned HMS Dominica over to the French at Guadeloupe and the French commissioned her as the privateer Napoléon. Napoléon and Impériale, with a large number of privateers and some troops aboard then sailed to Dominica where they captured a British vessel. (Note: The French had 73 men on Dominica, including 16 soldiers. Impériale had a crew of 65 men and was armed with one 9-pounder gun and two 2-pounder guns.) On 24 May, at Roseau, the President of Dominica wanted to send out a vessel to chase Napoléon and Impériale. Captain Dyneley of Duke of Montrose was at Roseau and was willing, but had a crew of only 22 men and boys. He also wanted the merchants at Dominica to agree to pay for Duke of Montrose if she was lost. The merchants refused, but Dyneley decide to go out anyway. The President then put on board 26 men from the 46th Regiment of Foot and 13 men from the light company of the 3rd West India Regiment, all under the command of Lieutenant Wallis of the 46th, and Duke of Montrose set out in chase.

Two British warships, Cygnet and Wasp were in the area. They arrived and joined the pursuit. Duke of Montrose succeeded in bringing Impérial to action and about 45 minutes of exchange of fire ensued. As Cygnet came up, Impériale struck. Wasp recaptured Napoléon. In his letter reporting the action, Admiral Alexander Cochrane, commander of the Leeward Islands Station, mentioned that "[T]he Captain of the Duke of Montrose Packet deserves great Credit for his Exertions".

Duke of Montrose, White, master, sailed from Falmouth on 31 December 1806, bound for New York. She was at Bermuda between 28 and 31 January 1807. Next, she was at New York between 18 February and 13 March. Homeward bound, she left Halifax, Nova Scotia, on 25 March, and arrived back at Falmouth on 15 April.

On 13 April 1807 Duke of Montrose arrived at Falmouth, having left New York on 13 March and Halifax on the 25th.

Captain Deneley sailed from Falmouth on 18 May 1807, bound for New York. She was at Halifax between 10 and 13 June, and New York between 22 June and 6 August. She left Halifax on 18 August, and arrived back at Plymouth on 8 September. An alternate report has Duke of Montrose arriving back at Falmouth on 13 July, having left New York on 4 June and Halifax on 16 June.

1st capture: In November Duke of Montrose, Donelely, master, sailed for the West Indies. On 12 December she was 200 miles to windward of Barbados where she encountered the French privateer Confiance, of 5 guns and 85 men. An engagement of three hours ensued in which Captain Dynally, the mate, and four crew men were killed, and the master and one man were wounded, out of a crew of 28. After Duke of Montrose struck, her captors took her into Guadeloupe. Confiance had five men killed and many men wounded.

HMS Eclair captured the merchant vessel Grand Duc de Berg on 27 September 1808 and brought her into Plymouth on 4 October. Grand Duc de Berg was the former Duke of Montrose, and was coming from Guadeloupe with a valuable cargo. Head money was finally paid in April 1829 to the surviving members of Eclair's crew. (Note: A first-class share was worth £31 4s 0½d; a sixth-class share was worth 9s 5¼d.)

Captain Aaron G. Blewitt was appointed captain of Duke of Montrose on 18 January 1809.

On 9 March 1809 Duke of Montrose sailed from Falmouth for Jamaica. She arrived at Barbados on 5 April and Jamaica on 16 April.

On 6 September 1809 Duke of Montrose arrived back at Falmouth from Cadiz.

Captain Blewett sailed from Falmouth on 14 March 1810. Duke of Montrose stopped at Bermuda on 20 to 23 April on her way to New York. She was at New York from 28 April 8 May. Homeward bound, she was at Halifax from 21 to 24 May, and arrived back at Falmouth on 20 June.

On 24 July 1810, Captain Aaron G. Blewitt sailed from Falmouth, bound for Brazil. Duke of Montrose was at Madeira on 10 August. She left Rio de Janeiro on 16 October and Bahia on 28 October. She arrived back at Falmouth on 11 December.

Duke of Montrose, "Blauvelt", master, left Falmouth on 11 March 1811, bound for New York. She was at Halifax on 20–25 April, and New York between 1 and 15 May. She was Halifax again between 26 and 31 May, and arrived back at Falmouth on 25 June.

Captain Blewitt sailed from Falmouth on 20 July 1811, bound for Brazil. Duke of Montrose was at Madeira on 1 and 2 August. She left Rio de Janeiro on 6 October and Bahia on 24 October. She arrived back at Falmouth on 13 December.

On 6 June 1812 Duke of Montrose, Blewit, master sailed from Falmouth. She was at Madeira on 16 and 17 June. There she took on the Townsend packet's passengers and mail for Brazil; Townsend returned to Falmouth. Duke of Montrose arrived at Rio de Janeiro on 25 July and left on 14 August. She arrived at Falmouth on 20 October.

Captain Aaron G. Blewitt sailed from Falmouth on 14 December 1812. Duke of Montrose was at Lisbon on 23 December, and Madeira between 3 and 5 January 1813. On 11 January she had a six-hour running fight with an American Privateer off the Canary Islands. Eventually the privateer sailed off. Duke of Montrose was at Bahia between 28 and 30 January. On 5 February she arrived at Rio de Janeiro from Bahia and Falmouth. She left Rio de Janeiro on 26 February. She arrived back at Falmouth on 2 May.

Captain Bluett (or Blewett) sailed from Falmouth on 13 May 1813.

2nd capture: During the War of 1812 the British Admiralty wrote to the United States Government that Great Britain would not accept as valid cartel agreements made on the high seas. On 10 June 1813, USS President captured the outward-bound Falmouth packet Duke of Montrose, Captain Aaron Groub Blewett, which managed to throw her mails overboard before President could send a prize crew aboard. President made a cartel of Duke of Montrose, putting all of President's prisoners from three earlier captures on board and then sending her and her now 79 passengers and crew into Falmouth under the command of an American officer. She arrived back at Falmouth on 16 June.

There the British government refused to recognize the cartel agreement that Blewett, his crew, and passengers had signed. Rather than turn Duke of Montrose over to the Agent for American Prisoners, the British government instructed Blewett to resume command of his ship and prepare her to sail again.

The day before her capture, Duke of Montrose had repelled an attack by an American privateer schooner of 14 guns after a two-hour engagement.

On 4 December 1813 Duke of Montrose arrived at Falmouth from Lisbon and Scilly.

3rd capture: Acting Captain John Forester (or Foster) sailed from Falmouth on 28 July 1813, bound for Brazil. Duke of Montrose was at Madeira between 7 and 11 August. She left Rio de Janeiro on 17 October and Bahia on 12 November. (She brought with her some of the prisoners that the USS Essex had taken when she had captured the Falmouth packet Nocton and taken to Valparaiso.) On 12 December the French frigates Sultana and Étoile captured Duke of Montrose at 33°36′N 23°57′W, after a five-hour chase. Her captors threw Duke of Montrose's guns, ammunition, and stores overboard and then allowed her to sail to England. Before they left, the French put on Duke of Montrose the prisoners they had taken from several captures. The French had captured the Falmouth packet Little Catherine on 25 November. John Vivian, her captain, was senior to Forester in the Packet Service so he took command of Duke of Montrose. He brought with him most of his crew and two passengers. The French also put on board the crews of the transport Diana and the brig Lucia.

Duke of Montrose arrived at Falmouth on 21 December.

On 25 November two French frigates, one of them Sultane, captured Little Catherine as she was sailing from Passages. (Note: One source gives the name of the companion frigate as Otter, but the French navy had no vessel by that name at any time between 1786 and 1861. Newspaper accounts identified the second frigate as Étoile.) The French took off Little Catherine's crew and abandoned her. On 28 November HMS Hotspur picked her up at sea. (Note: A first-class share of the salvage money was worth £46 10s 9½d; a sixth-class share, that of an ordinary seaman, was worth £9 6s 2d.) Hotspur found her plundered, all but two of her guns thrown overboard, with her sails set, but her rudder free so that she drifted at the mercy of wind and waves. Captain the Honourable Jocelny Percy of Hotspur put a crew on board who took her into Penzance. A gale on the 30th upset her and put her on her beam ends, where she lay waterlogged.

On 4 June 1814, Duke of Montrose arrived at Jamaica from Falmouth. She returned to Falmouth on 6 August. On 15–16 July she had encountered a hurricane that she and her escort simply had to ride out.

Captain Blewett sailed from Falmouth on 11 September 1814, bound for Halifax. She was at Halifax between 21 October and 3 November. She returned to Falmouth on 19 November.

== Fate ==
Duke of Montrose was lost at Barbados on 29 April 1815, the day that she arrived there from Falmouth. She had put her mail on a boat not long before she was lost.
