= HMS Belette (1814) =

Brig-sloop of the Royal Navy

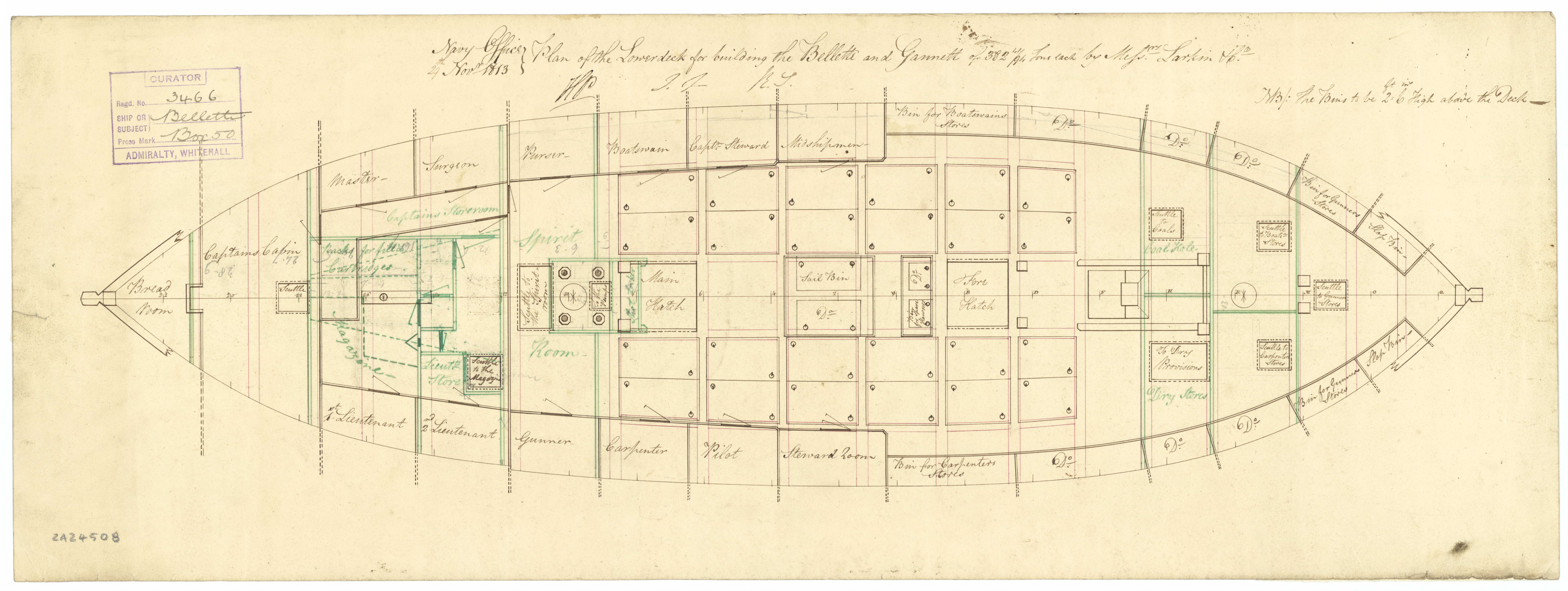
- Belette

History

United Kingdom
- Name: HMS Belette
- Builder: Edward Larking & William Spong, King's Lynn
- Launched: 1814
- Completed: 1818
- Commissioned: May 1818
- Decommissioned: December 1821
- Recommissioned: September 1822
- Decommissioned: 1827
- Fate: Sold, 26 March 1828

General characteristics
- Class & type: Cruizer-class brig-sloop
- Tons burthen: 38426/94 (bm)
- Length: 100 ft 0 in (30.48 m) o/a; 77 ft 2 7/8 in (23.543 m) (keel)
- Beam: 30 ft 7 in (9.32 m)
- Depth of hold: 12 ft 9 in (3.89 m)
- Sail plan: Brig
- Complement: 121
- Armament: 16 × 32-pounder carronades; 2 × 6-pounder bow guns

HMS Belette (or Bellette) was an 18-gun Cruizer-class brig-sloop, built by Edward Larking and William Spong at Kings Lynn and launched in 1814. She was the second Cruizer-class brig-sloop to bear the name. Belette had an uneventful career performing peacetime patrols and was sold in 1828.

== Service ==
With the war with France ending there was no immediate need for her services. She was therefore brought to Sheerness on 13 July and laid up; she was not finished until 1818.

Belette was commissioned in May 1818 under Commander George Pechell for the Halifax station. (While still only a lieutenant, Pechell had been acting commander of Belette's sister ship, Recruit in 1811.) At Halifax Belette enforced the obligations under the Treaty of Ghent with respect to revenue and fisheries. In carrying out these duties she took into custody numerous vessels of varying types that she suspected of violating the Treaty or the revenue laws. In one case Pechell seized an American brig that was carrying £20,000 of illegal goods from India. The vessel was purportedly only carrying flour and stores, but a close search found the concealed goods. Pechell sent the vessel into Halifax.

In 1819 Belette carried on to Bermuda the mails that the packet boat Blucher had brought to Halifax. In the summer of 1820 Bellette patrolled Passamaquoddy Bay on the border with the United States to stop the illegal plaster trade. This effort was a notable failure, with smugglers attacking the naval vessel's boats.

In 1820 Rear Admiral Griffith appointed Pechell to the command of the frigate Tamar, her captain being unwell, but the Admiralty canceled the appointment and Pechell returned to Belette after having served on Tamar for some six months. While in Tamar Pechell, with the authority of the Haitian government, had captured a brigantine purporting to be Haitian.

Belette was paid off in December 1821 and then spent most of 1822 at Plymouth undergoing repairs. She was recommissioned in September under Commander John Leith for the West Indies. She was then paid off in 1827 at Chatham.

== Fate ==
Belette was put up for sale on 19 June 1827. The Admiralty sold her on 26 March 1828 to Adam Gordon for £1,210.
