= John H. Marshall =

John H. Marshall may refer to:

- John Marshall (cricketer, born 1837) (John Hannath Marshall, 1837–1879), English cricketer and clergyman
- John Marshall (athlete) (John Henry Marshall, born 1963), former middle-distance track athlete
- John Marshall (archaeologist) (John Hubert Marshall, 1876–1958), Director-General of the Archaeological Survey of India, 1902–1928
- John H. Marshall (politician) (1841–1913), American politician from Pennsylvania
- John Houlton Marshall (1768–1837), Nova Scotia naval commander
