= Cruizer-class brig-sloop =

Class of brig-sloops of the British Royal Navy

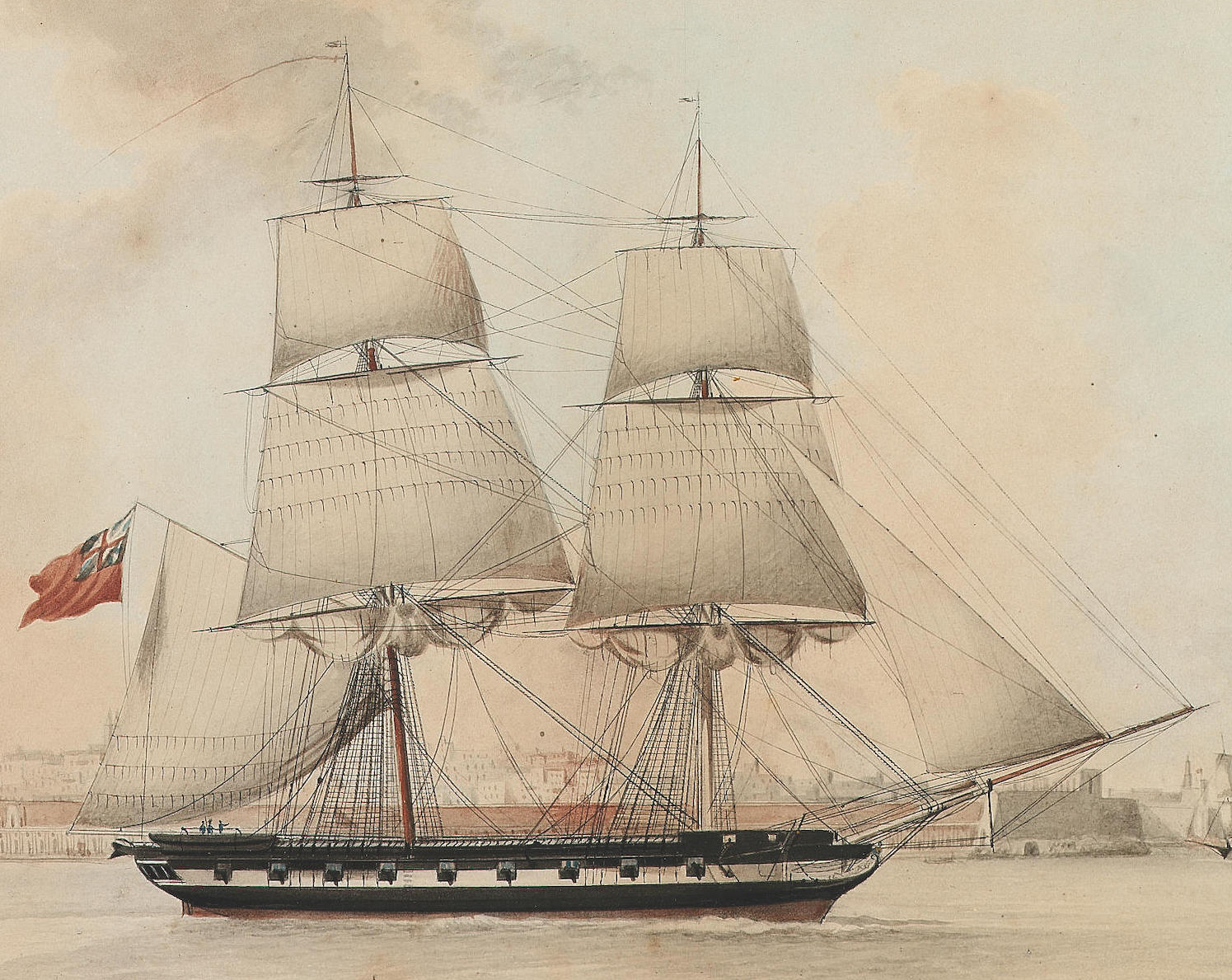
- 1833 painting of HMS Pelican

Class overview
- Name: Cruizer class
- Operators: Royal Navy
- In service: 1797–1865
- Completed: 110

General characteristics
- Type: Brig-sloop
- Tons burthen: 38241/94 (bm)
- Length: 100 ft (30 m) (overall); 77 ft 3 1/2 in (23.559 m) (keel)
- Beam: 30 ft 6 in (9.30 m)
- Depth of hold: 12 ft 9 in (3.89 m)
- Sail plan: Brig
- Complement: 121
- Armament: 2 × 6-pounder bow guns; 16 × 32-pounder carronades

The Cruizer class was an 18-gun class of brig-sloops of the Royal Navy. Brig-sloops were the same as ship-sloops except for their rigging. A ship-sloop was rigged with three masts whereas a brig-sloop was rigged as a brig with only a fore mast and a main mast.

The Cruizer class was the most numerous class of warships built by the British during the Napoleonic Wars, with 110 vessels ordered to this design (including two completed as ship sloops, and another 3 cancelled), and the second most numerous class of sailing warship built to a single design for any navy at any time, after the smaller 10-gun Cherokee-class brig-sloops.

Of the vessels in the class, eight (8%) were lost to the enemy, either destroyed or taken. Another was taken, but retaken. Fourteen (13%) were wrecked while in British service. Lastly, four (4%) foundered while in British service. In all cases of foundering and in many cases of wrecking all the crew was lost. Many of the vessels in the class were sold, some into mercantile service (of these, one at least was wrecked, but the fate of the others is generally unknown).

== Design ==
In December 1796, the Navy Board placed new orders for four flush-decked sloops, to differing designs by the two Surveyors of the Navy — Sir William Rule and Sir John Henslow. In order to compare the qualities of ship-rigged and brig-rigged vessels, one vessel to each design was to be completed as a ship-sloop and the other as a brig-sloop. While the Henslow-designed vessels (the brig-sloop Busy and the ship-sloop Echo) would see no further sister ships built, the Rule-designed vessels (the brig-sloop Cruizer and the ship-sloop Snake) would each have a single sister ship ordered in the following March, and Rule's Cruizer design would subsequently see 106 constructed during the Napoleonic War. The hull design was exceeding fine (narrow as compared to length), with a noted deadrise amidships and a sharp sheer, giving away the design that had origins in the smaller cutter-type designs.

The order placed in March 1797 for the first sister ship to Cruizer was quickly amended to compete the ship (Osprey) as a ship sloop, but new orders for brig-sloops to the Cruizer design were placed from 1802 up to 1813. A final order in 1815 (HMS Samarang) was cancelled in 1820.

The Cruizer-class brig-sloops proved to be fast sailers and seaworthy, and the 32-pounder carronade armament gave them enormous short-range firepower, exceeding the nominal broadside of a standard 36-gun 18-pounder frigate. To a Royal Navy increasingly desperate for manpower, the great attraction of the design was that — thanks to the two-masted rig and the use of carronades with their small gun crews — this firepower could be delivered by a crew only a third the size of a frigate's. The Dutch built three 18 gun-brigs — Zwaluw, Mercuur and Kemphaan — to a similar design; in one case apparently a copy, though without the square tuck stern. The Russian brig Olymp was also built to the same lines.

The naval historian (and novelist) C.S. Forester commented in relation to the smaller gun-brigs (brig-rigged vessels of under 200 tons) that

The type was a necessary one but represented the inevitable unsatisfactory compromise when a vessel has to be designed to fight, to be seaworthy and to have a long endurance, all on a minimum displacement and at minimum expense. Few men in the Royal Navy had a good word to say for the gun-brigs, which rolled terribly and were greatly over-crowded, but they had to be employed.

Later in the same book he was more complimentary as regards the larger brigs such as the Cruizer class HMS Penguin.

Perhaps the most salient aspect of his statement is that the Cruizer class and its smaller sister class, the Cherokee class, highlight the huge expansion of the Royal Navy. Whatever else one may say of the class, the Cruizer-class brig-sloops were both fast and provided serious firepower for minimal crewing, characteristics that appealed to a Navy suffering serious and ever increasing staffing shortages. The class proved to be ideal for many of the shallow water commitments in the Baltic and Ionian Seas, as well as around Danish waters.

== Manning ==
Prior to 1808, the complement of officers, men, and boys for a Cruizer-class brig-sloop included 15 Royal Marines. After 1808, the vessels carried 20 marines comprising 1 sergeant, 1 corporal and 18 privates (the marine contingent on unrated vessels did not include a commissioned officer).

== Service in the War of 1812 ==
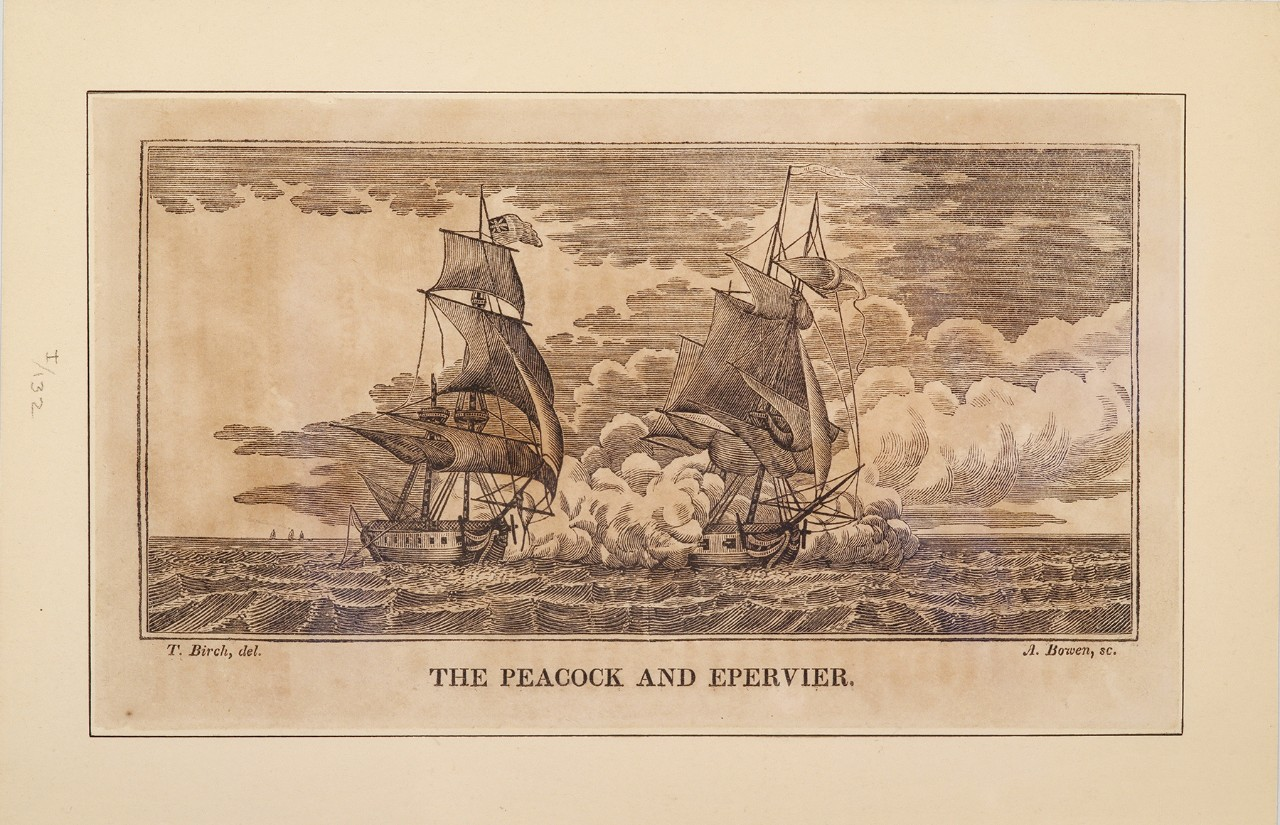
HMS Epervier (right), a Cruizer-class sloop, fighting against the larger USS Peacock (left) during the War of 1812.

During the War of 1812, several ships of the class fell victim to larger American ship-rigged sloops of war of nominally the same class. The American vessels enjoyed an advantage in weight of broadside and number of crew. The ship-rigged sloops enjoyed the ability to back sail, and their rigging proved more resistant to damage; by contrast, a single hit to the brig-sloop's rig could render it unmanageable. In many cases, however, the American advantage was in the quality of their crews, as the American sloops generally had hand-picked volunteer crews, while the brigs belonging to the overstretched Royal Navy had to make do with crews of limited numbers. During a battle with the equivalently armed and crewed American brig Hornet, HMS Penguin was unable to land a single shot from her cannons, with the only American losses being inflicted by Royal Marines aboard the British ship.

The comparison was made in the London press unfavorably and was not entirely fair. The American ship-rigged sloops were bigger vessels, averaging just over 500 tons (bm); the Cruizer-class vessels were not quite 400 tons (bm). The crew sizes were disproportionate at 175 to 120, and at least some of the Cruizer class in these combats were outfitted with 24-pounder carronades vice the normal 32-pounders. The rigging was often the deciding factor as the combat between USS Peacock and HMS Epervier would highlight. When HMS Epervier lost her main topmast and had her foremast damaged she was disabled. USS Wasp, in another combat, would retain control despite the loss of her gaff, main topmast, and the mizzen topgallant. USS Wasp versus HMS Avon provided another example. Despite being fought gallantly, Avon was crippled by loss of a gaff. She then lost her main mast, which loss rendered her immobile. The Cyrus-class vessels, built in 1813–1814, were intended as an answer to the American ship-rigged sloops.

== Vessels ==
The following table lists the Cruizer-class brig-sloops (and the two Snake-class brig-sloops, which were identical apart from carrying a three-masted ship rig) according to the date on which the Admiralty ordered them.

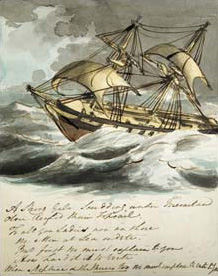
Sketch of a brig-sloop, probably HMS Clio, by Cmdr. William Farrington, c. 1812, Peabody Essex Museum

Name	Ordered	Builder	Laid down	Launched	Fate
Snake (ship rig)	19 December 1796	Balthazar & Edward Adams, Bucklers Hard	January 1797	18 December 1797	Sold to be broken up on 18 April 1816
Cruizer (brig rig)	19 December 1796	Stephen Teague, Ipswich	February 1797	20 December 1797	Broken up February 1819
Victor (ship rig)	11 March 1797	Josiah & Thomas Brindley, King's Lynn	April 1797	19 March 1798	Sold to be broken up on 5 September 1808
Osprey (brig rig)	15 March 1797	Thomas Pitcher, Northfleet	never commenced to original design		order subsequently altered to ship rig, and built to a slightly longer design

All subsequent vessels were brig-rigged on completion, although several were later converted to three-masted ship rig.

=== St Vincent's Board ===
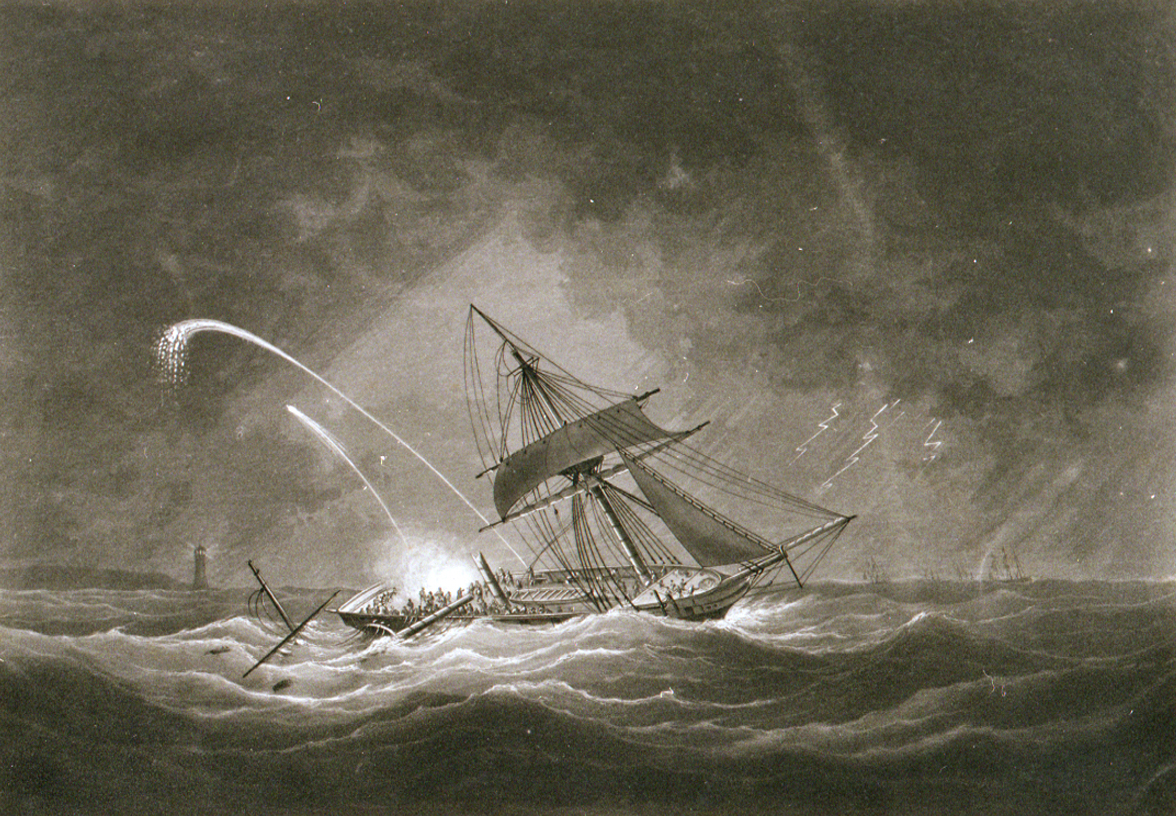
HMS Surinam struck by lightning, 11 December 1806, by Nicholas Matthews Condy, National Maritime Museum, Greenwich

The Board ordered 19 in 1802 and 1803.

Name	Ordered	Builder	Launched	Fate
Scorpion	27 November 1802	John King, Dover	17 October 1803	Sold 1819
Dispatch	27 November 1802	Richard Symons, Falmouth	26 May 1804	Broken up 1811
Scout	27 November 1802	Peter Atkinson, Hull	7 August 1804	Sold 1827
Musquito	27 November 1802	John Preston, Great Yarmouth	4 September 1804	Sold 1822
Swallow	27 November 1802	Benjamin Tanner, Dartmouth	24 December 1805	Broken up 1815
Ferret	27 November 1802	Benjamin Tanner, Dartmouth	4 January 1806	Abandoned as a wreck 1813
Leveret	16 July 1803	John King, Dover	14 January 1806	Wrecked 1807
Belette	16 July 1803	John King, Dover	21 March 1806	Wrecked 1812
Amaranthe	15 October 1803	John Dudman, Deptford Wharf	20 November 1804	Sold 1815
Calypso	15 October 1803	John Dudman, Deptford Wharf	2 February 1805	Broken up 1821
Espoir	7 November 1803	John King, Dover	22 September 1804	Broken up 1821
Surinam	7 November 1803	Obadiah Ayles, Topsham	January 1805	Sold for breaking up 1825
Wolverine	7 November 1803	Thomas Owen, Topsham	1 March 1805	Sold 1816
Moselle	7 November 1803	John King, Dover	October 1804	Sold 1815
Weazel (or Weazle)	7 November 1803	Thomas Owen, Topsham	2 March 1805	Sold 1815
Minorca	7 November 1803	Josiah & Thomas Brindley, King's Lynn	14 June 1805	Broken up 1814
Racehorse	7 November 1803	Hamilton & Breeds, Hastings	17 February 1806	Wrecked 1822
Avon	9 December 1803	Richard Symons & Co., Falmouth	31 January 1805	Foundered 28 August 1814 as a result of damage in fight against U.S. 22-gun sloop-of-war Wasp on the previous day
Rover	9 December 1803	Joseph Todd, Berwick	13 February 1808	Sold 1828

=== Melville's First Board ===
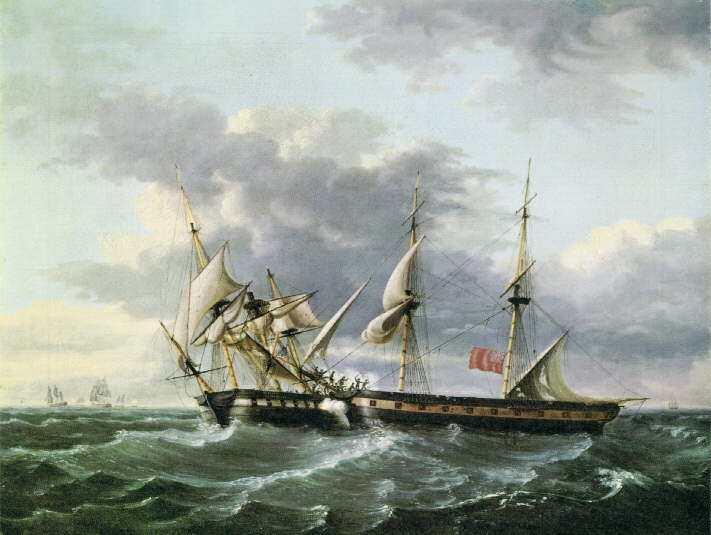
An earlier USS Wasp boards the Cruizer-class HMS Frolic, 1812

The Board ordered six vessels to this design during May 1804, all of fir. Building of fir (pine) made for speedier construction at the cost of reduced durability in service.

Name	Ordered	Builder	Launched	Fate
Beagle	22 May 1804	Perry, Wells & Green, Blackwall Yard	8 August 1804	Sold 1814
Elk	22 May 1804	Frances Barnard, Sons & Co., Deptford Dockyard	22 August 1804	Broken up 1812
Raven	23 May 1804	Perry, Wells & Green, Blackwall Yard	25 July 1804	Wrecked 1805
Saracen	23 May 1804	Perry, Wells & Green, Blackwall Yard	25 July 1804	Broken up 1812
Reindeer	23 May 1804	Samuel & Daniel Brent, Rotherhithe	15 August 1804	Taken by USS Wasp and burnt 1814
Harrier	23 May 1804	Frances Barnard, Sons & Co., Deptford Dockyard	22 August 1804	Believed to have foundered near Rodrigues Island in the Indian Ocean in March 1809

=== Barham's Board ===
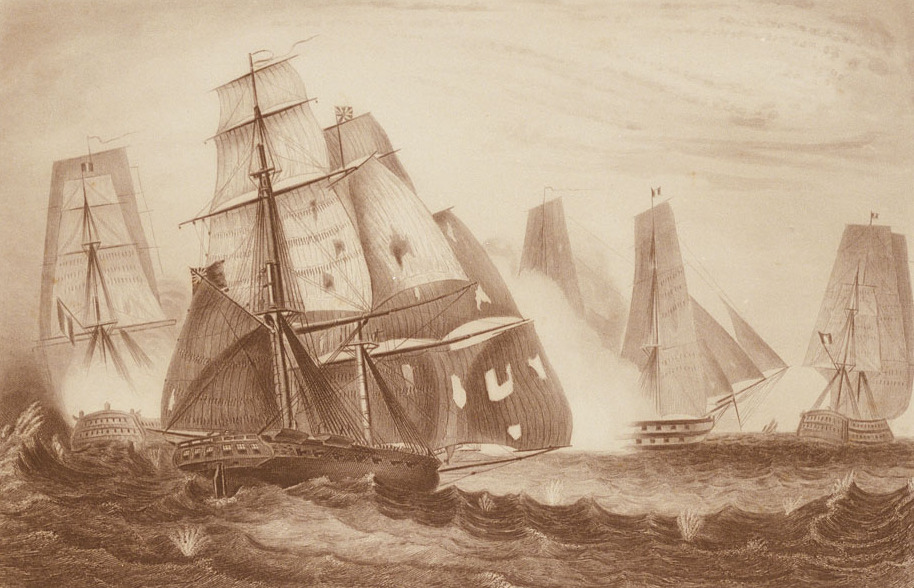
The Cruizer-class HMS Recruit (foreground) harries the French 74-gun D'Hautpoul, 1809

The Board ordered 22 vessels to this design, seventeen of which were launched in 1806 and five in 1807.

Name	Ordered	Builder	Launched	Fate
Forester	16 July 1805	John King, Dover	3 August 1806	Sold 1819
Foxhound	16 July 1805	John King, Dover	30 November 1806	Foundered 1809
Mutine	22 July 1805	Henry Tucker, Bideford	15 August 1806	Sold 1819
Emulous	21 August 1805	William Row, Newcastle	June 1806	Wrecked 1812; crew saved but Emulous was unsalvageable.
Grasshopper	30 August & 31 October 1805	Richards (Brothers) & (John) Davidson, Hythe	29 September 1806	Stranded at Texel and surrendered to the Dutch on 25 December 1811. She became the brig Irene and was broken up at Vlissingen in 1822.
Columbine	12 November 1805	Balthazar & Edward Adams, Bucklers Hard	16 July 1806	Wrecked January 1824 in Port Longue Harbour, Sapientza Island, Greece.
Pandora	12 November 1805	John Preston, Great Yarmouth	11 October 1806	Wrecked February 1811 on the Scaw Reef off the coast of Jutland. .
Alacrity	14 January 1806	William Row, Newcastle	13 November 1806	Taken by French brig Abeille 1811; in French Navy as Alacrity until broken up in 1822.
Raleigh	16 January 1806	Francis Hurry, Newcastle	24 December 1806	Sold 1841
Primrose	21 January 1806	Thomas Nickells, Fowey	5 August 1807	Wrecked 1809
Cephalus	22 January 1806	Custance & Stone, Great Yarmouth	10 January 1807	Broken up 1830
Procris	22 January 1806	Custance & Stone, Great Yarmouth	27 December 1806	Sold 1815
Redwing	24 January 1806	Matthew Warren, Brightlingsea	30 August 1806	Foundered 1827 after leaving Sierra Leone; wreckage washed ashore in November near Mataceney suggested that lightning had started a fire that destroyed her.
Ringdove	27 January 1806	Matthew Warren, Brightlingsea	16 October 1806	Sold 1829
Peacock	27 January 1806	Jabez Bayley, Ipswich	9 December 1806	Taken and sunk by U.S. sloop of war Hornet 1813.
Sappho	27 January 1806	Jabez Bayley, Ipswich	15 December 1806	Broken up 1830
Recruit	27 January 1806	Thomas Hills, Sandwich	31 August 1806	Sold 1822
Royalist	27 January 1806	Thomas Hills, Sandwich	10 January 1807	Sold 1819
Carnation	28 January 1806	William Taylor, Bideford	3 October 1807	Taken by French brig Palinure 1808 and burnt 1809
Clio	29 January 1806	James Betts, Mistleythorn	10 January 1807	Broken up 1845
Philomel	4 February 1806	(Nicholas) Bools & (William) Good, Bridport	11 September 1806	Sold 1817
Frolic	4 February 1806	(Nicholas) Bools & (William) Good, Bridport	9 December 1806	Taken by U.S. 22-gun sloop-of-war Wasp but retaken; broken up 1813

=== Grenville's Board ===
The Board ordered ten vessels to this design – all on 1 October 1806, nine of which were launched in 1807 and one in 1808.

Name	Ordered	Builder	Launched	Fate
Derwent	1 October 1806	Isaac Blackburn, Turnchapel, Plymouth	23 May 1807	Sold 1817
Eclair	1 October 1806	Matthew Warren, Brightlingsea, Essex	8 July 1807	Broken up 1831
Eclipse	1 October 1806	John King, Dover	4 August 1807	Sold for mercantile use 1815
Barracouta	1 October 1806	Jabez Bayley, Ipswich	6 July 1807	Sold 1815
Nautilus	1 October 1806	James Betts, Mistleythorn	5 August 1807	Broken up 1823
Pilot	1 October 1806	Robert Guillaume, Northam, Southampton	6 August 1807	Sold 1828
Sparrowhawk	1 October 1806	Matthew Warren, Brightlingsea, Essex	20 August 1807	Sold 1841
Zenobia	1 October 1806	Josiah & Thomas Brindley, King's Lynn	7 October 1807	Sold 1835
Magnet	1 October 1806	Robert Guillaume, Northam, Southampton	19 October 1807	Wrecked 1809
Peruvian	1 October 1806	George Parsons, Warsash	26 April 1808	Broken up 1830

=== Mulgrave's Board ===
This Board ordered 14 vessels to this design during 1807 and 1808.

Name	Ordered	Builder	Launched	Fate
Pelorus	30 July 1807 (contract 7 October 1807)	Robert Guillaume, Northam	25 June 1808	Sold for mercantile use at Singapore 1842 and wrecked 1844
Doterel	31 December 1807 (contract 9 January 1808)	Richard Blake & John Scott, Bursledon	6 October 1808	Broken up c.1855
Arachne	4 August 1808	Thomas Hills, Sandwich	18 February 1809	Sold 1837
Persian	4 August 1808	Daniel List, Cowes	2 May 1809	Wrecked 1813
Castilian	4 August 1808	Thomas Hills, Sandwich	29 May 1809	Broken up 1829
Charybdis	5 September 1808	Mark Richards & John Davidson, Hythe	28 August 1809	Sold 1819
Scylla	5 September 1808	Robert Davy, Topsham	29 June 1809	Broken up 1846
Thracian	30 September 1808	Josiah & Thomas Brindley, Frindsbury	15 July 1809	Broken up 1829
Trinculo	5 November 1808	Richard Blake & John Tyson, Bursledon	15 July 1809	Broken up 1841
Hecate	5 November 1808	John King, Upnor	30 May 1809	Sold 1817 and resold to Chile 9 November 1818; served as Galvarino until broken up 1828.
Crane	5 November 1808	Josiah & Thomas Brindley, Frindbury	29 July 1809	Foundered 1814
Rifleman	5 November 1808	John King, Upnor	12 August 1809	Sold 1836; became a merchantman and whaler; last listed 1856
Echo	21 November 1808	John Pelham, Frindsbury	1 July 1809	Broken up 1817
Sophie	21 November 1808	John Pelham, Frindsbury	8 September 1809	Sold 1825

=== Charles Yorke's Board ===
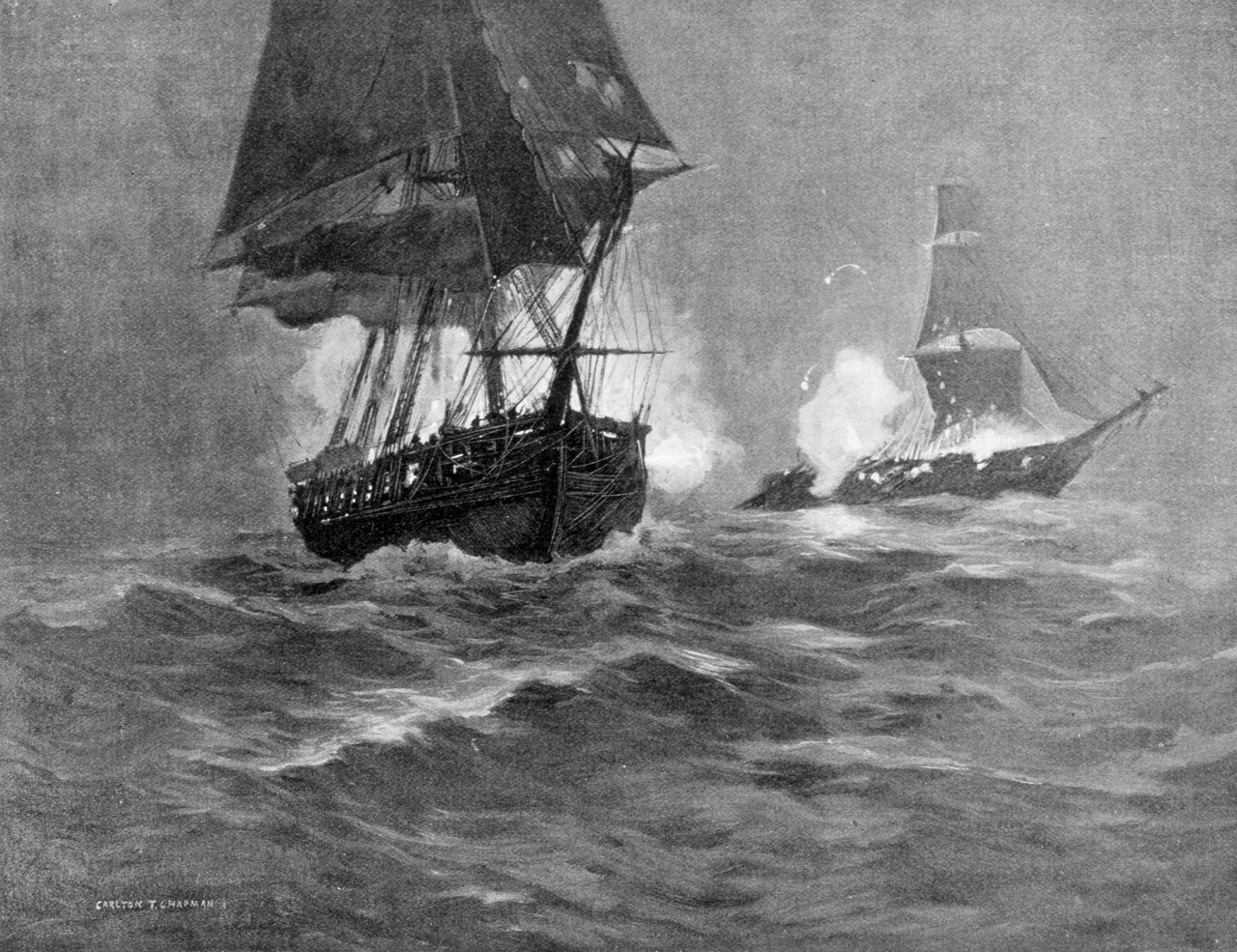
USS Wasp engages the Cruizer-class HMS Avon, 1814

This Board ordered 15 of the design between January 1811 and January 1812.

Name	Ordered	Builder	Launched	Fate
Childers	19 January 1811	Portsmouth Dockyard (M/Shipwright Nicholas Diddams)	9 July 1812	Broken up 1822
Curlew	30 August 1811	(William) Good & Co., Bridport	27 May 1812	Sold at Bombay 1822; from 1823 as Jamesina served as an opium runner for Jardine & Matheson until at least the mid-1830s.
Wasp	30 August 1811	Robert Davy, Topsham	9 July 1812	Broken up 1847
Fairy	30 August 1811	William Taylor, Bideport	11 June 1812	Broken up 1821
Pelican	30 August 1811	Robert Davy, Topsham	August 1812	Sold 1865
Bacchus	30 August 1811	Chatham Dockyard (M/Shipwright Robert Seppings)	17 April 1813	Breakwater at Harwich 1829
Pandora	30 August 1811	Deptford Dockyard (M/Shipwright Robert Nelson to July 1811; completed by William Stone)	12 August 1813	Sold 1831
Nimrod	26 September 1811	Jabez Bayley, Ipswich	25 May 1812	Bilged after being run ashore in a storm. Salved with no loss of life, but sold as unrepairable in 1827
Saracen (2nd of name)	26 September 1811	(Nicholas) Bools & (William) Good, Bridport	25 July 1812	Sold 1819
Satellite	5 October 1811	Daniel List, Fishbourne	9 October 1812	Sold in East Indies 1824
Arab	24 October 1811	John Pellham, Frindsbury	22 August 1812	Wrecked, with the loss of all her crew, in Broad Haven near Belmullet on the coast of Mayo, Ireland, in 1823.
Espiegle	2 November 1811	Jabez Bayley, Ipswich	10 August 1812	Sold 1832
Heron (ex-Rattlesnake)	14 November 1811	John King, Upnor	22 October 1812	Broken up 1831
Dispatch (2nd of name)	14 November 1811	John King, Upnor	7 December 1812	Sold 1836
Grasshopper (2nd of name)	6 January 1812	Portsmouth Dockyard (M/Shipwright Nicholas Diddams)	17 May 1813	Sold 1832

=== Melville's Second Board ===
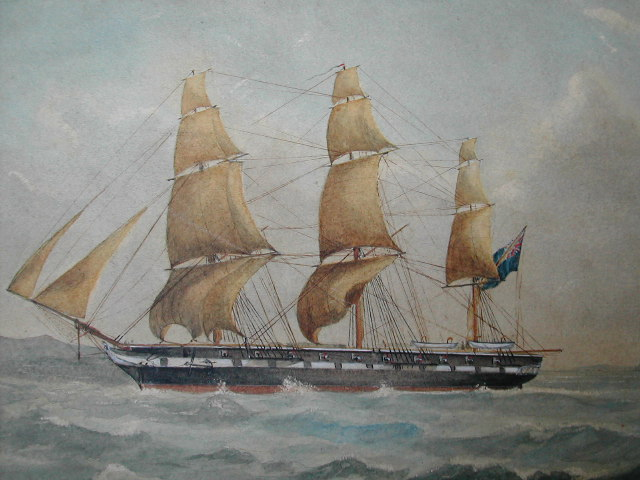
HMS Pelorus c. 1830, after conversion to a three-masted ship-sloop.

The Board ordered 20, of which only eighteen were built; two were cancelled.

Name	Ordered	Builder	Launched	Fate
Fly	23 April 1812	Jabez Bayley, Ipswich	16 February 1813	Sold at Bombay 1828
Epervier	6 May 1812	Mrs. Mary Ross, Rochester	21 December 1812	Taken by 22-gun sloop USS Peacock 1814
Jaseur	6 May 1812	Jabez Bayley, Ipswich	2 February 1813	Sold 1845
Argus	8 June 1812	Thomas Hills, Sandwich	11 September 1813	Sold 1828
Halcyon	7 July 1812	Edward Larking & William Spong, King's Lynn	16 May 1813	Wrecked 1814
Challenger	29 July 1812	Hobbs & Hellyer, Redbridge	15 May 1813	Sold at Trincomalee 1824
Penguin	20 August 1812	William Bottomley, King's Lynn	29 June 1813	Taken by U.S. brig Hornet and scuttled 1815
Lynx (ex-Pandora; renamed 24 September 1812)	7 September 1812	M/Shipwright Edward Sison		Cancelled
Victor	2 October 1812	East India Company, Bombay (M/Shipwright Jamsetjee Bomajee Wadia)	29 October 1814	Foundered in 1842 with all hands while en route from Vera Cruz, Mexico to Halifax, Nova Scotia.
Zebra	2 October 1812	East India Company, Bombay (M/Shipwright Jamsetjee Bomajee Wadia)	18 December 1815	Wrecked 1840
Carnation (2nd of name)	8 October 1812	William & James Durkin, Norham (Southampton)	29 July 1813	Sold 1836
Elk (2nd of name)	2 November 1812	Hobbs & Hellyer, Redbridge (Southampton)	28 August 1813	Sold 1836
Confiance	2 November 1812	Mrs. Mary Ross, Rochester	30 August 1813	Wrecked, with the loss of all her crew, between Moyin Head and the Three Castles Head near Crookhaven, Ireland, in 1822.
Alert	2 November 1812	Thomas Pitcher, Northfleet	13 July 1813	Sold 1832
Harlequin	2 November 1812	Jabez Bayley, Ipswich	15 July 1813	Sold at Jamaica 1829
Harrier (2nd of name)	2 November 1812	Jabez Bayley, Ipswich	28 July 1813	Sold 1829
Ontario (ex-Mohawk; renamed 9 April 1813)	2 November 1812	Richard Chapman, Bideford	26 October 1813	Sold 1832
Belette (2nd of name)	14 August 1813	Edward Larking & William Spong, King's Lynn	18 June 1814	Sold 1828
Gannet	14 August 1813	Edward Larking & William Spong, King's Lynn	13 November 1814	Sold 1838
Samarang	6 September 1815	Portsmouth Dockyard (M/Shipwright Nicholas Diddams)		Cancelled 30 September 1820

== See also ==
- Bibliography of early American naval history
