= Lancaster (1803 ship) =

History

France
- Launched: 1787
- Fate: British ownership 1803

United Kingdom
- Name: Lancaster
- Acquired: 1803
- Fate: Last listed 1825

General characteristics
- Tons burthen: 270, or 273 (bm)
- Complement: 30, or 54
- Armament: 1805:18 × 9-pounder guns & 18-pounder carronades; 1806:6 × 9-pounder guns + 13 × 18-pounder carronades; 1810:4 × 9-pounder guns

Lancaster was built in France in 1787. She entered British ownership c.1803. In 1805 she made one voyage as a slave ship in the triangular trade in enslaved people during which a French privateer captured her in a single-ship action, but the Royal Navy recaptured her, enabling her to complete her voyage. She also recaptured a British ship. Thereafter she traded widely until she was last listed in 1825.

== Career ==
Lancaster entered Lloyd's Register (LR) in 1804 with Stephens, master, James & Co., owner, and trade Liverpool–Barbados.

Year	Master	Owner	Trade	Source
1805	W. Stephens; J.Robinson	James & Co. Johnson & Co.	Liverpool–Barbados	LR; large repair 1802

Captain John Robinson acquired a letter of marque on 21 January 1805 for Lancaster. He sailed from Liverpool on 17 February 1805, bound for West Africa to acquire captives. Lancaster, Robinson, master, was sailing from Africa to the West Indies when on 30 November 1805 a French privateer captured her. HMS Wasp recaptured Lancaster and sent her into Barbados. Lancaster had had four men killed and nine wounded when she was captured.

Lancaster arrived at Barbados on 7 December. There she landed 285 captives.

Lancaster sailed from Barbados on 22 January 1806, in company with Atalanta. The two vessels separated on 5 February in a gale

Lancaster arrived at Waterford on 4 April 1806. On her way to Liverpool she struck a submerged rock off the Saltee Islands. She had taken on 6 feet (1.8 m) of water in her hold and had to unload before she could proceed. She had left Liverpool with 54 crew members and had suffered 10 crew deaths on her voyage.

Before she struck the rock, Lancaster recaptured Recovery, Wylie, master. Recovery had been sailing from Greenock to Cork and St Vincent when a French privateer had captured her off the Saltees. After her recapture, Recovery went into Cork. (Note: Recovery, of 169 tons (bm), had been launched at Irvine, North Ayrshire, in 1797.)

Year	Master	Owner	Trade	Source
1806	J.Robinson; J. Griffin	Johnson & Co.	Liverpool–Africa; Liverpool–Buenos Aires	LR; large repair 1802
1810	Turnbull	Johnson & Co.	Liverpool–Buenos Aires	Register of Shipping (RS); large repair 1802 and good repair 1808
1812	Turnbull; T.Voyce	Johnson & Co.	Liverpool–Buenos Aires	LR
1814	T.Voyce; M.Mason	Child & Co.	Liverpool–Cape Breton Island	LR
1815	W. Mason	Child & Co.	Leith–Rotterdam; London–Bermuda	LR
1820	M'Dunet	Robertson	Liverpool–Africa	LR; damages repaired 1816
1825	M'Danot	Robertson	Liverpool–Africa	RS; damages repaired 1816

== Fate ==
Lancaster was last listed in Lloyd's Register in 1823 and in the Register of Shipping in 1825.
