= HMS Constant =

Brig of the Royal Navy

History

Royal Navy
- Name: Constant
- Ordered: 30 December 1800
- Builder: John Dudman, Deptford Dockyard
- Laid down: January 1801
- Launched: 28 April 1801
- Completed: 10 June 1801
- Commissioned: May 1801
- Decommissioned: February 1816
- Honours and awards: Naval General Service Medal with clasp "St. Sebastian"
- Fate: Sold 15 February 1816

General characteristics
- Class & type: Archer-class gun-brig
- Tons burthen: 17924/94 (bm)
- Length: Overall:80 ft 2 in (24.43 m); Keel:65 ft 11 in (20.09 m)
- Beam: 22 ft 7 in (6.88 m)
- Draught: 5 ft 7 in (1.70 m)
- Depth of hold: 9 ft 5 in (2.87 m)
- Sail plan: brig-rig
- Complement: 50
- Armament: 2 × 18 or 32-pounder bow carronades + 10 × 18-pounder carronades

HMS Constant was an Archer–class gun-brig of the Royal Navy, launched in 1801 for service against the French during the French Revolutionary and Napoleonic Wars. She was variously stationed in English home waters, the Baltic, the Caribbean, and off the coast of Spain, and was responsible for the capture of at least seven enemy vessels during her fifteen years at sea. The Royal Navy sold Constant at Chatham Dockyard in 1816.

== Construction ==
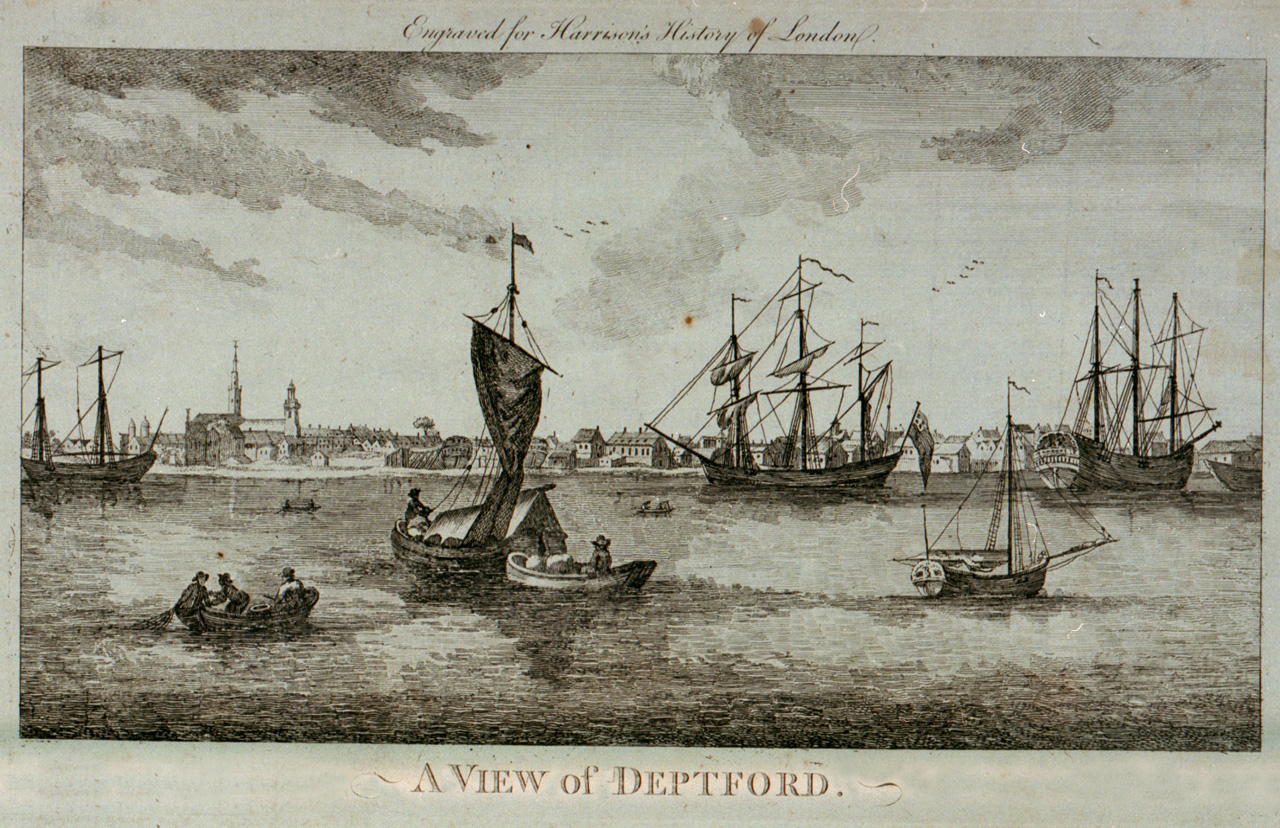
Waterfront at Deptford, where Constant was constructed in 1801.

Constant was one of ten Archer-class gun-brigs ordered as a batch in December 1800 to a design by Navy Surveyor Sir William Rule. The gun-brigs were intended to bolster the Royal Navy's capacity to hunt small French privateers, and to act as anti-invasion craft should France attempt to land troops in the British Isles.

In keeping with her class, Constant was two-masted and brig-rigged, with an overall length of 80 ft 2 in (24.4 m) including bowsprit, a 65 ft 11 in (20.1 m) keel, and measuring 179 24/94 tons burthen. Her draft was 5 ft 7 in (1.70 m), sufficiently shallow to permit operations close to shore. She was also heavily armed relative to her size, with two 18 or 32-pounder bow carronades and ten 18-pounder carronades in side ports along her deck.

Constant's crew complement was 35, including a Navy Lieutenant, a sailing master, a surgeon's mate, midshipman, six petty officers and 25 able or ordinary seamen. (Note: Petty officers aboard Constant were a carpenter's mate, a ropemaker, sailmaker, clerk, quartermaster and quartermaster's mate.) The crew was supported by a detachment of 15 Royal Marines, bringing total on-board personnel to 50 men.

== Naval service ==
Constant was commissioned in May 1801 under Lieutenant James Bremer and stationed in English home ports for the following two years. In April 1803 she sailed to Leith in Scotland for patrols in the North Sea, including to hunt for privateers seeking to attack the British whaling fleet. She returned to Deptford at the conclusion of the whaling season, and in August 1803 her command was transferred to Lieutenant John Stokes who would remain with her for the next ten years.

Under Stokes' command Constant was initially stationed in the English Channel and off the Dutch coast. In 1806 she was active in pursuing and seizing Dutch merchant vessels, capturing at least five including a 75 ft 6 in (23.01 m) brig and a 68 ft 2 in (20.78 m) hoy. The captured vessels were auctioned for prize money at Great Yarmouth in November 1806 and February 1807, alongside their assorted cargoes of tallow, wine and herring. (Note: Captured vessels were the brig Elizabeth, the hoy Vrouw Lucia and a collection of smaller craft, Frau Teresia, Jonge Jan Geuken and an unnamed vessel. Constant and Earnest captured Frau Teresta and a ship of unknown name on 7 and 8 August. These, in addition to her 1810 capture of the brig off Morbihan, and the 1813 capture of L'Olympe, bring Constant's total confirmed prizes to seven vessels.)

Constant may also have recaptured the British merchant ship Fortune which had been seized by a French privateer in February 1807 during a voyage from Newcastle upon Tyne to Jamaica. (Note: A contemporaneous source incorrectly names the vessel that recaptured Fortune as HMS Constance, but she was also later named as Constant.) (Note: Fortune's subsequent fate is unclear. On 24 February 1807 Lloyd's List reported her as lost on the Dutch coast, but a report of 3 March indicated she had made port at Harwich.)

In 1808 Constant was assigned to convoy duty in the Baltic, returning to England for repairs and refitting at Northfleet in February and March 1809. After a further voyage to the Baltic, Constant was reassigned to Channel patrols. On 5 September 1810 she was in company with the 38-gun HMS Surveillante off the Loire River in France, when their crews observed a French merchant convoy heading south towards the Gulf of Morbihan. The British vessels gave chase and forced a brig in the convoy to seek shelter close to shore where she was protected by two batteries of French cannons. The water was too shallow for Surveillante to engage the brig directly. Instead her ship's boats were lowered to assault and board the brig and bring her out to sea. Constant was also brought close to shore to support the attack, with Stokes' crew exchanging fire with French troops located on the beach and in caves. The brig was boarded and captured without British casualties, and Surveillante and Constant returned to open waters with their prize.

In January 1809, Constant was driven ashore on the coast of Sweden. She was refloated, repaired, and returned to service.

Constant's final victory at sea occurred on 21 April 1813. Briefly stationed in the Caribbean, she encountered and captured the 2-gun French privateer L'Olympe off the Îles des Saintes near Guadeloupe. Constant then returned to England.

In late 1813 she operated off the coast of Spain. In July–August, Constant was part of a squadron of some 17 vessels that participated in the siege of San Sebastián. Because of the shallowness of the water, only the smaller vessels could approach closely enough to bring their guns to bear on the town's defenses. In 1847 the Admiralty awarded the clasp "St. Sebastian" to the Naval General Service Medal to all surviving naval participants at the siege.

On 13 October 1813 HMS Telegraph caused the destruction of the French 16-gun brig Flibustier (1810) in the mouth of the Adour. Flibustier had been in St Jean de Luz sheltering where shore batteries could protect her when she sought to escape because of the approach of Wellington's army. She started out during a "dark and stormy night", but Telegraph immediately pursued her. After an action lasting three-quarters of an hour, the French saw Challenger and Constant coming up to join the engagement. Flibustier's crew set her on fire and escaped ashore; she then blew up.

On 21 March 1814, Constant was in company with the frigate President and the brig-sloop Bacchus off Finisterre as they escorted a fleet from Cork to Portugal.

In May she returned the captain and crew of the Post Office Packet Service ship Little Catherine from Madeira to Penzance. (An American privateer had captured her on 8 May and put them on board a Russian vessel that had carried them to Madeira.)

Constant was decommissioned at Chatham Dockyard, and Captain Stokes and his crew paid off to join other vessels.

== Fate ==
After decommissioning, Constant was left tied up at Chatham with her guns and masts removed. She declared surplus to Navy requirements in 1815 when the Treaty of Paris formally brought the war with France to an end. She was sold at Chatham Dockyard on 15 February 1816 for a total sum of £600.

== Bibliography ==
- James, William (1837). Naval History of Great Britain. Vol. 5. Richard Bentley. ISBN 9781108021708.
- Winfield, Rif (2007). British Warships of the Age of Sail 1714–1792: Design, Construction, Careers and Fates. Seaforth. ISBN 9781844157006.
