= John Price (British Army officer) =

Major-General John Price (died November 1747) was an officer of the British Army.

== Biography ==
He was the younger son of John Price of Tiptree in Essex, by his wife Judith (née Reynolds). His elder brother Robert was a serjeant-at-law and recorder of Colchester.

Price joined the Army as an ensign in a regiment of Foot in 1706, and on 15 October 1723 was promoted to captain in the 1st Regiment of Foot Guards, ranking as a lieutenant-colonel. On 13 January 1741 he was made colonel of the newly raised 57th Regiment of Foot, later the 46th, and on 22 June 1743 he transferred to the colonelcy of the 14th Regiment of Foot. Price was promoted to brigadier-general on 6 June 1745 and commanded an infantry brigade in the Netherlands during the campaign of 1747. During the Battle of Val on 2 July his brigade was stationed in the village of Val, and for his gallantry Price was mentioned in despatches by the Duke of Cumberland.

John Price died at Breda in November 1747. By his wife Sarah, daughter of Matthew Martin of Wivenhoe, he left a son Martin and a daughter Mary, who was married to the Hon. and Very Rev. Edward Townshend, dean of Norwich.

Military offices
Preceded by Regiment raised	Colonel of the 57th Regiment of Foot; 1741–1743	Succeeded by Thomas Murray
Preceded by Jasper Clayton	Colonel of the 14th Regiment of Foot; 1743–1747	Succeeded by William Herbert
