= HMS Skipjack (1808) =

1800 schooner

History

France
- Name: Confiance
- Builder: U.S.A.
- Launched: 1800
- Commissioned: October 1806
- Captured: 23 August 1808 by the Royal Navy

United Kingdom
- Name: HMS Skipjack
- Acquired: 23 August 1808
- Fate: Broken up 1812

General characteristics
- Tons burthen: 112 (bm; 81 63/94 by calc.)
- Length: 71 ft 4 in (21.74 m) (overall); 60 ft 5 in (18.4 m) (keel)
- Beam: 18 ft 11 in (5.77 m)
- Depth of hold: 7 ft 8 in (2.34 m)
- Propulsion: Sails
- Sail plan: Schooner
- Complement: 70 (at capture)
- Armament: At capture: 7 guns; British service: 12 guns

HMS Skipjack was the French privateer schooner Confiance, launched in 1800 at Baltimore. The Royal Navy captured her in 1808 and took her into service. She then participated in the capture of Guadeloupe in 1810. She was paid off in 1811 and broken up in 1812.

== Confiance ==
The French armed Confiance at Guadeloupe in October 1806. Though pierced for 16 guns, she carried fewer.

On 12 December 1807, Confiance, of seven guns and 90 men, captured the packet Duke of Montrose after an engagement that lasted three and a half hours. Duke of Montrose did not strike until after having lost her master, Birt Dynely, her mate, and four seamen killed, and two men wounded. Confiance took Duke of Montrose into Guadeloupe. (Note: In May 1806 Dynely and Duke of Montrose had captured the French naval schooner Impériale, which the Navy had taken into service as HMS Vigilant.)

== Capture ==
On 23 August 1808 Belette captured the French privateer schooner Confiance, of seven guns (though pierced for 16) and 70 men. She was three days out from Cayenne. (Note: A first-class share of the prize money was worth £38 7s 6 3/4d; a sixth-class share was worth 15s 10 1/2d.) The Royal Navy took Confiance into service as Skipjack.

== British service and fate ==
Lieutenant Thompson commissioned Skipjack later that year.

In January-February 1810, Skipjack participated in the capture of Guadeloupe, which earned for her crew the clasp "Guadaloupe" to the Naval General Service Medal that the Admiralty issued in 1847 to all surviving claimants, as well as prize money that she shared with 49 other vessels. (Note: A first-class share of the prize money was worth £113 9s 1 3/4d; a sixth-class share, was worth £1 9s 5 1/2d.)

Skipjack was paid off in 1811 and broken up in the next year.
