= HMS Bacchus (1813) =

Brig-sloop of the Royal Navy

- Bacchus

History

United Kingdom
- Name: HMS Bacchus
- Namesake: Bacchus
- Ordered: 30 August 1811
- Builder: Chatham Dockyard (M/Shipwright Robert Seppings)
- Laid down: January 1812
- Launched: 17 April 1813
- Commissioned: May 1813
- Fate: Breakwater 1829

General characteristics
- Class & type: Cruizer-class brig-sloop
- Tons burthen: 384 51/94 (bm)
- Length: 100 ft 3 1/2 in (30.6 m) (overall); 77 ft 3 1/2 in (23.6 m) (keel)
- Beam: 30 ft 7 in (9.3 m)
- Depth of hold: 12 ft 9 in (3.9 m)
- Propulsion: Sails
- Sail plan: Brig
- Complement: 121
- Armament: 16 × 32-pounder carronades + 2 × 6-pounder bow chasers

HMS Bacchus was a British Royal Navy Cruizer-class brig-sloop launched in 1813 and expended as a breakwater in 1829. In between, she recaptured or captured a number of small merchant vessels.

== Career ==
In May 1813 Commander Lewis Hole commissioned Bacchus for the Cork station. On 13 August Bacchus was at 44°58′N 14°55′W, escorting a convoy of 15 vessels from Gibraltar and Cadiz. The convoy had been out 27 days.

On 29 October, the French privateer schooner Ravenant, of four guns and 160 men, captured two vessels off The Lizard: Mermaid, Kelly, master, sailing from Liverpool to Falmouth, and Moston, M. Millan, master, sailing from Newfoundland to Cork. Bacchus recaptured both vessels and sent them in, Mermaid to Plymouth and Moston to Dartmouth.

Hole received promotion to post captain on 4 December 1813, but remained on Bacchus until February 1814. Commander George Wickens Willes replaced Hole.

On 21 March 1814, Bacchus was in company with the frigate President and the gun-brig Constant off Finisterre as they escorted a fleet from Cork to Portugal. The American privateer Grand Turk captured Catherine, Brown, master, on 11 April as Catherine was sailing from Lisbon to London. Bacchus recaptured Catherine, only to have Grand Turk recapture her on 28 April and burn her.

In May Commander William Slaughter replaced Willes, but in June Commander William Hill replaced Slaughter. (Willes received promotion to post captain on 7 June 1814.) On 3 September Bacchus grounded on the shore of the back of Spike Island, near Cork.

In December 1816 Commander Edward Barnard replaced Hill. In July 1817, Commander John Parkin replaced Barnard.

== Fate ==
Bacchus was laid up at Deptford in January 1820. She then in August 1826 was fitted to receive coals. On 22 September 1828, the "Principal Officers and Commissioners of His Majesty's Navy" offered "Bacchus brig, of 384 tons", lying at Deptford, for sale. She failed to sell so between June and August 1829 she underwent fitting for service as a breakwater at Harwich. She was towed there on 13 August 1829.

She was still in place in 1845.
