= HMS Leveret (1806) =

Cruizer-class brig-sloop built at Dover, England

- Leveret

History

United Kingdom
- Name: HMS Leveret
- Ordered: 16 July 1803
- Builder: John King of Dover
- Launched: 14 January 1806
- Fate: Wrecked 10 November 1807

General characteristics
- Type: Cruizer-class brig-sloop
- Tons burthen: 38422/94 (bm)
- Length: 100 ft 0 in (30.48 m) (gundeck); 77 ft 2 3/4 in (23.539 m) (keel)
- Beam: 30 ft 7 in (9.32 m)
- Draught: 6 ft 8 in (2.03 m) (laden);10 ft 0 in (3.05 m) (unladen)
- Depth of hold: 12 ft 9 in (3.89 m)
- Sail plan: Brig rigged
- Complement: 121
- Armament: 16 × 32-pounder carronades + 2 × 6-pounder bow guns

HMS Leveret was a Cruizer-class brig-sloop built at Dover, England, and launched in 1806. She was wrecked in 1807.

== Service history ==
Commander George Salt commissioned Leveret in February 1806. She sailed for the Mediterranean in April 1807 and was off Cádiz, Spain, in July 1806. Later she sailed to the Baltic Sea. On 21 October 1806 she recaptured the brig Beaver, of Great Yarmouth.

Later in October 1806, Commander Richard James Laurence O’Connor took command. (Note: His previous command was the hired armed ship Hannibal, which was wrecked in November 1804.) She was under his command when she was wrecked on the Galloper Rock near Great Yarmouth during a gale on 10 November 1807. She had been ordered to see Waldemaar, a captured Danish ship-of-the-line, safely into port. There were no deaths as the fishing smack Samuel came up and Leveret's crew used her boats to transfer to the smack.

A contemporary newspaper report has the gale forcing Leveret onto the "Long Sand", where she lost her rudder. With 7 feet (2.1 m) of water in her hold, she was drifting towards the Galloper Rock. As the water level rose, the crew were ordered to abandon ship and took to the boats. A vessel from Ipswich then took them to Harwich.

The court martial, held on board the 44-gun fifth rate frigate HMS Magnanime in Sheerness Harbour on 18 November 1807, ruled that O'Connor, his officers, and his crew had made every exertion to save their ship once she had struck. Rear-Admiral Wells, Commander-in-Chief Sheerness, then charged that O'Connor had not helped a frigate "on her beam ends" on the Long Sand on 10 November. The court ruled that O'Connor was blameless and that the charge was not proven. O'Connor's next command was the 18-gun brig HMS Ned Elven.
