= HMS Halcyon (1813) =

Brig-sloop of the Royal Navy

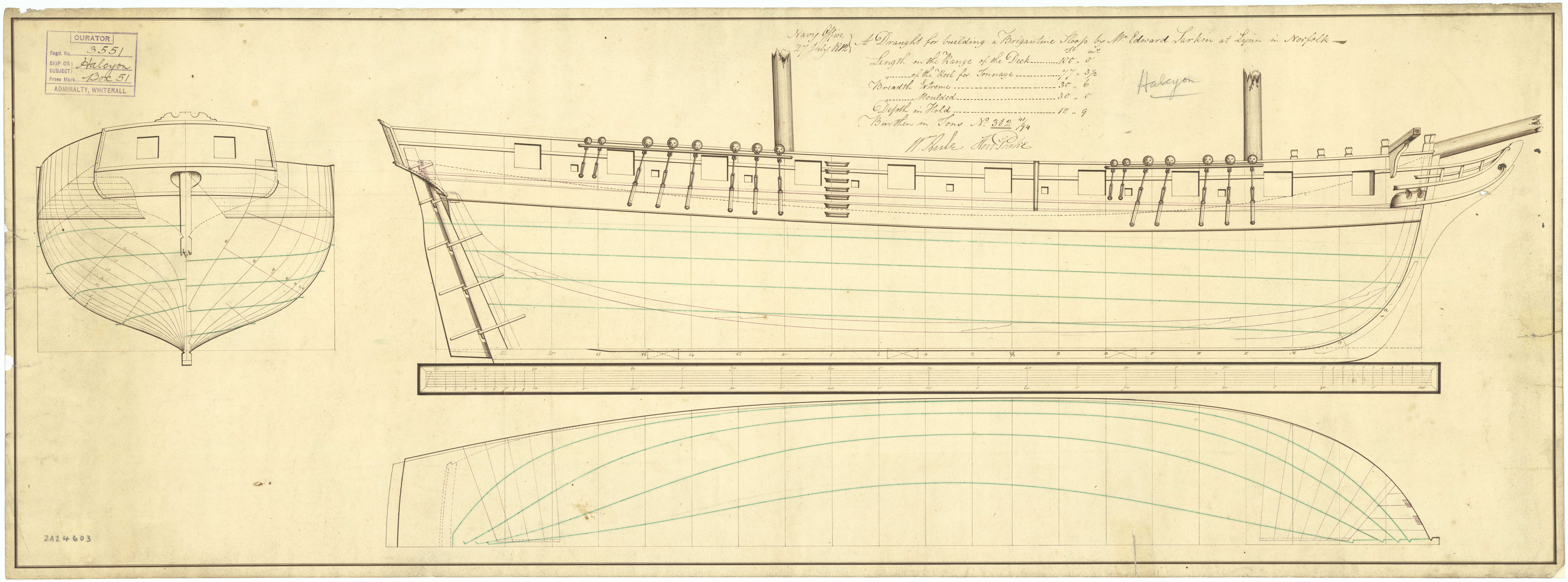
- Halcyon

History

United Kingdom
- Name: HMS Halcyon
- Builder: Edward Larking & William Spong, King's Lynn
- Launched: 1813
- Commissioned: 13 July 1813
- Fate: Wrecked, 19 May 1814

General characteristics
- Class & type: Cruizer-class brig-sloop
- Tons burthen: 38377/94 (bm)
- Length: 100 ft 1 1/2 in (30.5 m) o/a; 77 ft 3 3/4 in (23.6 m) (keel)
- Beam: 30 ft 8 in (9.3 m)
- Draught: 6 ft 4 in (1.9 m) (laden); 11 ft 0 in (3.4 m) (unladen)
- Depth of hold: 12 ft 9 1/2 in (3.9 m)
- Sail plan: Brig
- Complement: 121
- Armament: 16 × 32-pounder carronades; 2 × 6-pounder bow guns

HMS Halcyon (1813) was a Royal Navy Cruizer-class brig-sloop that Edward Larking & William Spong built at King's Lynn and launched in 1813. She had one of the shortest lives of any vessel of her class.

Commander John Houlton Marshall commissioned Halcyon on 13 July for the West Indies. During her short period of active duty Halcyon escorted convoys and cruised. Less than a year after her commissioning she was wrecked.

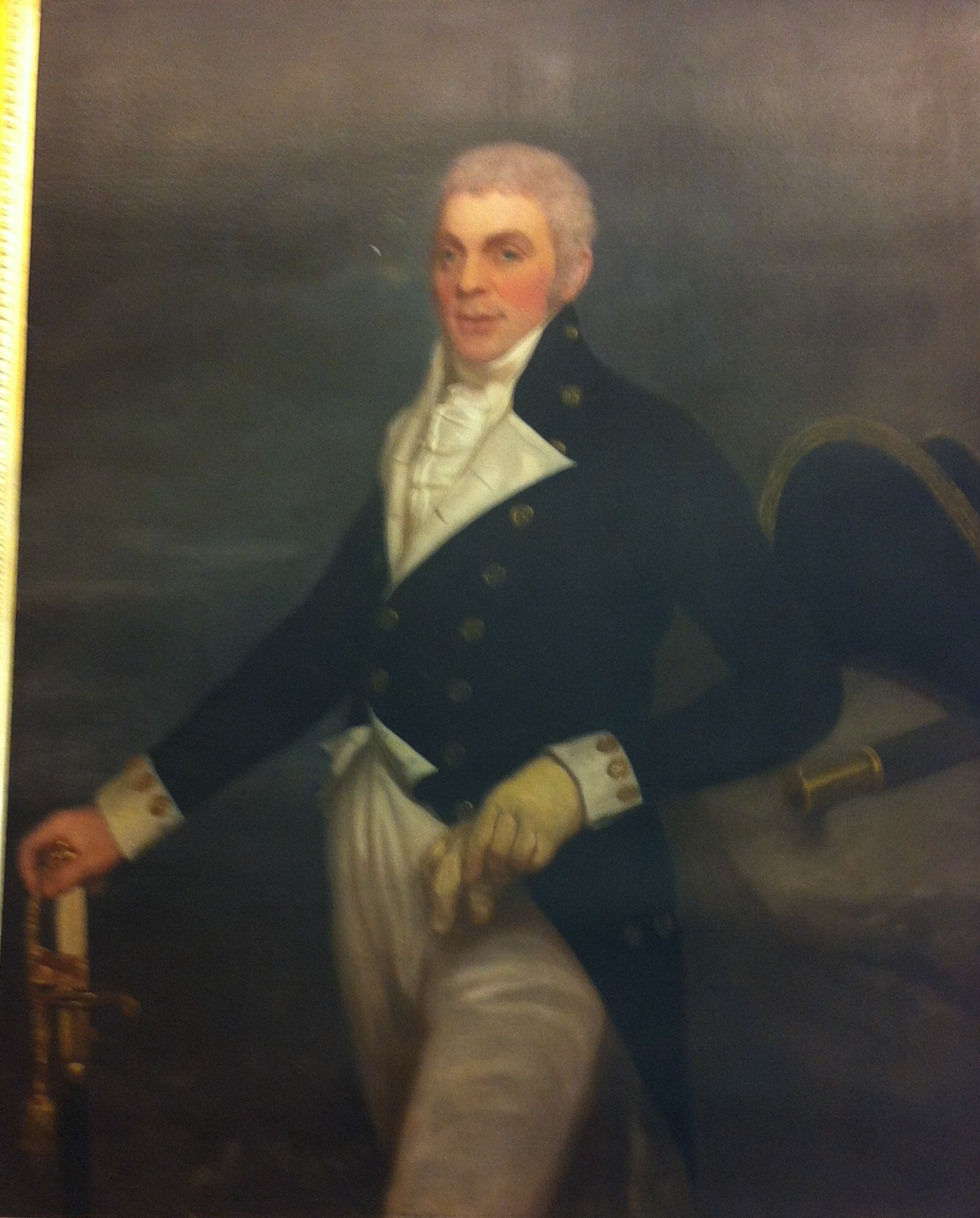
Commander John Houlton Marshall, Province House (Nova Scotia)

On her last cruise she left Britain on 6 April 1814. Because of the number of sick men aboard Halcyon, Marshall decided to sail to Annotto Bay, Jamaica, to get fresh provisions. On 19 May 1814, while reentering the bay to retrieve her boat, Halcyon hit a reef off Free Point. Despite efforts to free her, by the early hours of the next morning she had filled with water and capsized to port. All her crew were saved by boats that were by then standing by.

The reef was marked on the charts but was found ex post to extend much farther than had been charted. Apparently, unknown to anyone but the locals, the reef extended four miles from the shore as a result of an earthquake in 1812.
