= HMS Dominica (1805) =

British schooner

History

United Kingdom
- Name: HMS Dominica
- Acquired: 1805 (by purchase)
- Captured: 21 May 1806 (by mutineers)

France
- Name: Napoléon
- Acquired: 21 May 1806 by capture
- Captured: 24 May 1806

United Kingdom
- Name: HMS Dominica
- Acquired: 24 May 1806 (by capture)
- Fate: Broken up 1808

General characteristics
- Tons burthen: 85 bm
- Propulsion: Sails
- Sail plan: Schooner or brig
- Armament: 6 guns

HMS Dominica was a schooner that the British purchased in 1805 in the Leeward Islands. (Note: Contemporary reports by her commanders refer to her as a sloop or a brig.) Her crew mutinied in 1806, turning her over to the French, who immediately sent her out as the privateer Napoléon. The British recaptured her four days after the mutiny and returned her to their service. In British service she captured some six small privateers. She was broken up in 1808.

== Initial service ==
The British commissioned Dominica under Lieutenant Robert Peter. On 11 August 1805 Dominica captured the small rowboat Hazard about two leagues off Scotts Head, Dominica. She had a crew of 14 men armed with small arms. She was three days out of Pointe-à-Pitre and had not captured anything. At about the same time, Dominica captured a schooner.

Later that month, on the 25th, Dominica chased a French rowboat privateer for several hours before catching her in the lee of Dominica. The privateer was the Ravanche, armed with a 12-pounder carronade in her bows and several swivel guns. She had only 15 men on board, having taken three small vessels during her eight weeks out of Guadeloupe.

A week later, on 2 September, at 8 am and about five leagues from The Saints, Dominica captured another rowboat, the Prudente. Prudente had not realized that Dominica was a warship and approached. As soon as she realized her mistake, she attempted to escape. The wind being calm, Peter sent Midshipman Jackson and eight volunteers in a boat to capture Prudente, while shooting grape and canister at her from Dominica. Two hours and two leagues on, Dominica's boat caught up with the privateer. After the British had fired a few volleys of small arms fire, the enemy surrendered. The British had one man hurt when the man broke his collarbone.

== Mutiny ==
In 1806 Lieutenant William Dean took command of Dominica. On 21 May, while Dean was on shore at Roseau collecting dispatches for Admiral Lord Alexander Cochrane, a crewman attacked the master, Richard Osborne. Osborne disarmed the man, but then other crewmen came up, captured Osborne, and secured him and the other loyal crew below deck. The mutineers then sailed Dominica overnight to Basse-Terre, Guadeloupe.

The mutineers reported that Roseau was defenseless and had merchant vessels in port with cargoes of sugar. The French immediately commissioned Dominica as the privateer Napoléon and put 73 men on board, including some artillerymen. Several of the mutineers remained on board as well. General Hortade, out of uniform, joined them. They then on 23 May sent Napoléon, under Captain Vincent Gautier, together with the schooner Impérial, towards Roseau.

== Recapture ==
The next day, the 24th, at Roseau, the President of Dominica wanted to send out a vessel to chase Napoléon and Impériale, which had succeeded in capturing a merchant vessel. Captain Dyneley of the packet boat Duke of Montrose was willing, but had a crew of only 22 men and boys. The President then put on board 26 men from the 46th Regiment of Foot and 13 men from the light company of the 3rd West India Regiment under the command of Lieutenant Wallis of the 46th, and Duke of Montrose set out in chase.

As Wasp was sailing into Prince Rupert Bay, Dominica, she received a signal from Cygnet, anchored there, that the enemy was in sight. Captain B. Sterling Bluett and Wasp immediately gave chase, with Wasp capturing a cutter, which turned out to be Napoléon. In her attempt to escape she had suffered two men killed; the British had no casualties In setting out to chase the French privateers, Duke of Montrose had caused Napoléon to alter her course and into the path of Wasp. Cochrane, in his dispatch, remarked on the lack of judgment involved in a general engaging in "petty predatory Warfare", and out of uniform.

Duke of Montrose succeeded in bringing Impérial to action and about 45 minutes of exchange of fire ensued. As Cygnet came up, Impérial struck. Cochrane also reported that "[T]he Captain of the Duke of Montrose Packet deserves great Credit for his Exertions".

Also at Roseau, Lieutenant Hamilton of the 46th, though ill, gathered a sergeant and 13 men from his regiment and set out in two merchantmen’s boats. They succeeded in recapturing the vessel the French had cut out even though she was several leagues at sea.

In recapturing Dominica, the British also recaptured several of the mutineers, including the ring leader, William (or Henry) Proctor. In his defense he produced evidence that he was an American and pointed out that he had harmed no one and had destroyed all the confidential signals before he had turned her over to the French. The court martial board nevertheless had him hanged. The cook, Naiad Suarie, was also sentenced to hang but received a Royal Pardon on the basis that he was a negro from Martinique whom Proctor had compelled to join the mutiny with threat of force.

== Return to service ==
The British immediately returned Dominica to service, commissioning her in June under Lieutenant Dean at Antigua. On 18 August the "Armed brig Dominica", as Dean referred to her, captured the French rowboat privateer Bateuse between Dominica and Marie-Galante. She had a crew of 19 men, but had sent ten to Martinique on a small schooner that she had captured off Saint Lucia. Bateuse was armed only with small arms.

Then on the night of 2 October Mr. King, the acting master, took Dominica's cutter and cut out two sloops, the Manette and the Dolphin, from under the shore batteries near Saint-Pierre, Martinique. The two prizes were carrying cargoes of rum and sugar.

Two days later, Dominica captured the French navy schooner Chiffone, which was armed only with small arms. The French were using her as a dispatch vessel between Guadeloupe and Martinique.

On 27 November Dominica captured the French lugger-rigged "Tow-boat" Basilisk, windward of Marie-Galante. She had a crew of 16 men and was armed with one brass 3-pounder gun. She was returning to Pointe-à-Pitre after a cruise of three months during which she had made three captures.

== Fate ==
Dominica was broken up in January 1808.
