= 46th (South Devonshire) Regiment of Foot =

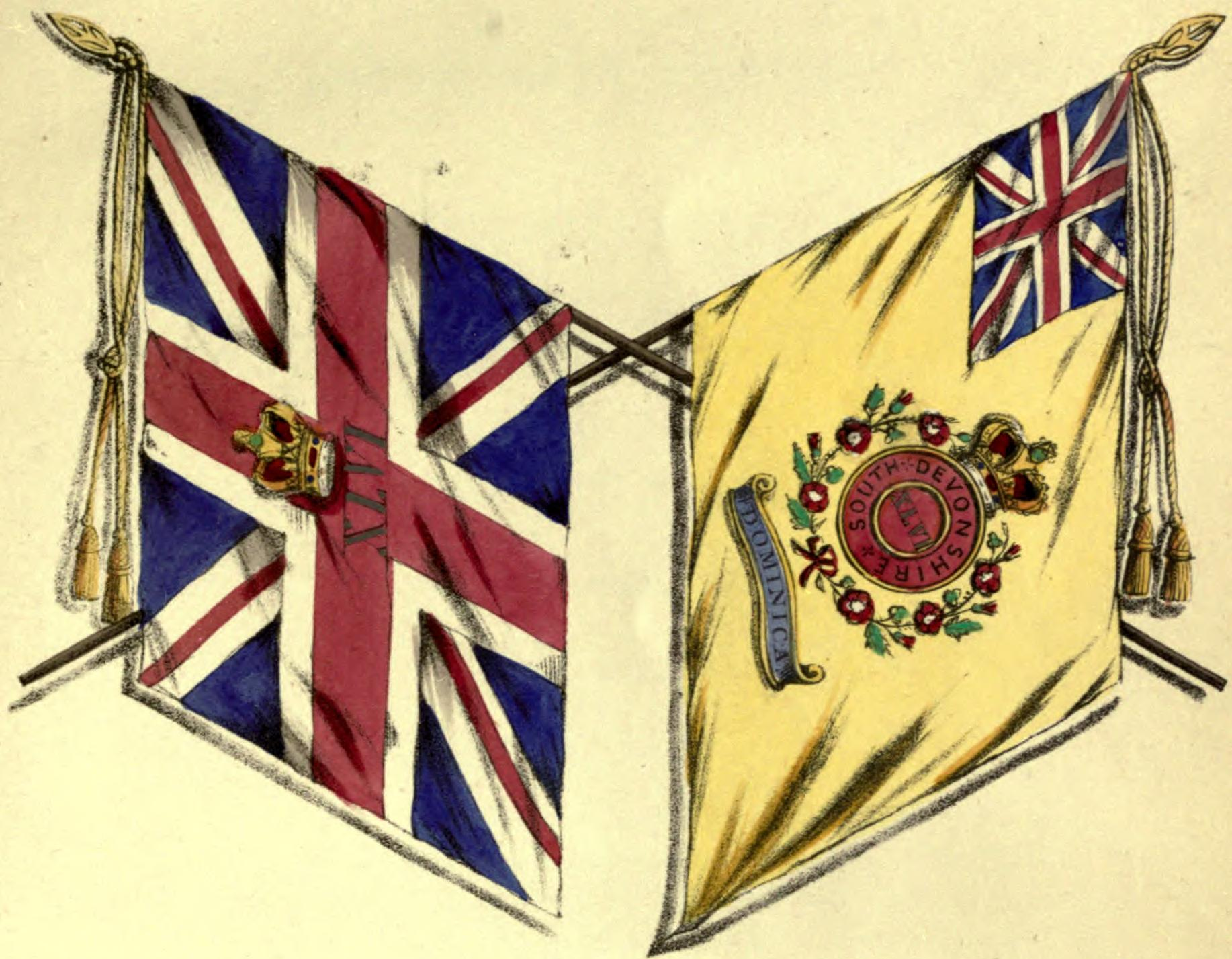
- c. 1851 illustration of the regimental colours
- Active: 1741–1881
- Country: Great Britain (1741–1800); United Kingdom (1801–1881)
- Branch: British Army
- Type: Infantry
- Role: Line infantry
- Size: One battalion (two battalions 1800–1802)
- Nicknames: The Red Feathers, Murray's Bucks, The Surprisers, The Lacedemonians.
- Colors: Light Yellow Facing, Silver Braided Lace
- Engagements: Jacobite rising French and Indian War; American Revolutionary War; Napoleonic Wars; Crimean War

The 46th (South Devonshire) Regiment of Foot was a line infantry regiment of the British Army. Raised in 1741, under the Childers Reforms it was amalgamated with the 32nd (Cornwall) Regiment of Foot to form the Duke of Cornwall's Light Infantry in 1881, becoming the second battalion of the new regiment.

== History ==
=== Early wars ===
A regimental private in c. 1742

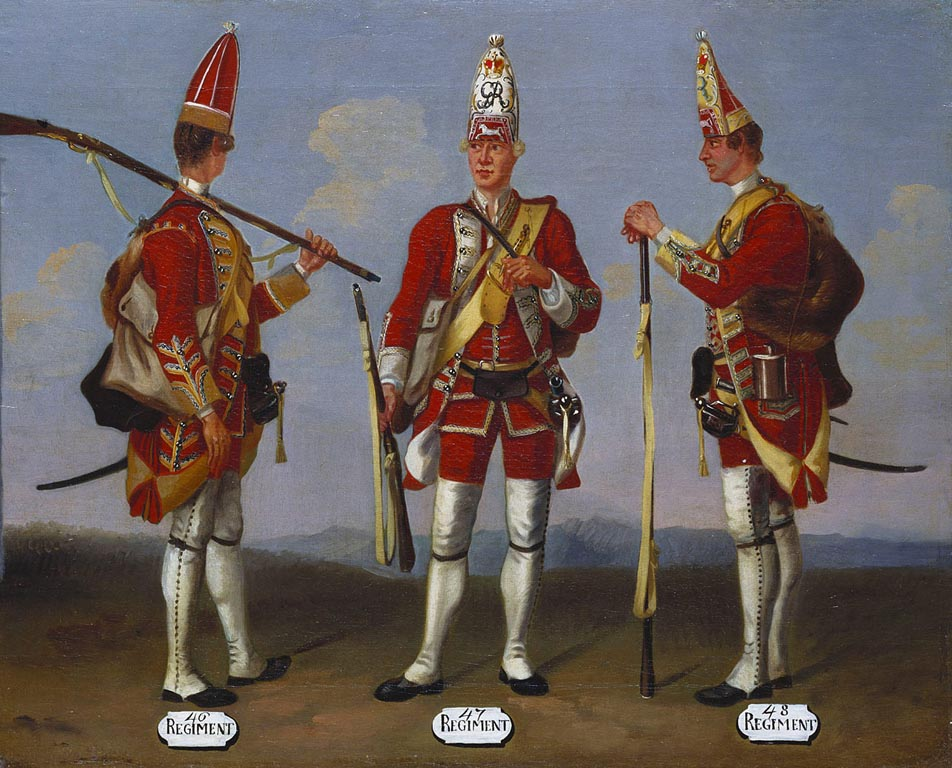
c. 1751 painting of a regimental grenadier (left)

The regiment was raised in Newcastle upon Tyne by John Price as John Price's Regiment of Foot in 1741. The regiment proceeded to Scotland and took part in the Battle of Prestonpans in September 1745 during the Jacobite rising. It was ranked as the 57th Regiment of Foot in 1747 but re-ranked as the 46th Regiment of Foot in 1751. After eight years' service in Ireland, the regiment embarked for Nova Scotia in May 1757 for service in the French and Indian War. The regiment saw action at the assault on Fort Ticonderoga in July 1758 the assault and capture of Fort Niagara in July 1759 and the Montreal Campaign in August to September 1760.

The regiment then moved to the West Indies in October 1761 and took part in the capture of Martinique in January 1762, the storming of Morro Castle in July 1762 and the capture of Havana in August 1762. The regiment returned home in 1767.

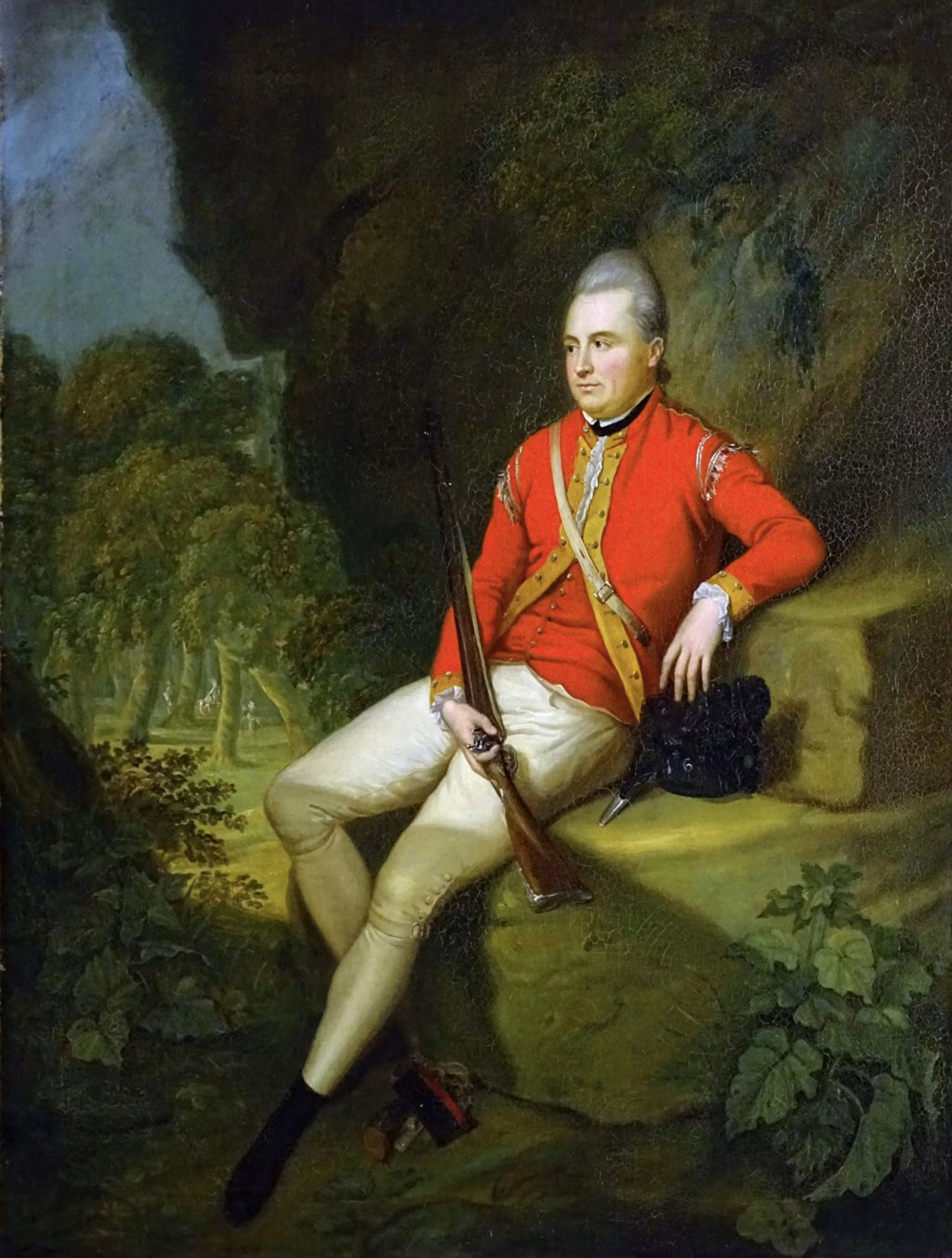
c. 1780 portrait of a regimental captain-lieutenant

The regiment arrived at in North Carolina in April 1776 for service in the American War of Independence/American Revolutionary War. It fought at the Battle of Sullivan's Island in June 1776, Battle of Long Island in August 1776, the Battle of White Plains in October 1776 and the Battle of Fort Washington in November 1776. It saw further action during the Philadelphia campaign at the Battle of Brandywine in September 1777 the Battle of Paoli also in September 1777 and the Battle of Germantown in October 1777. It was following the British attack on the Americans at Paoli, where the light company of the regiment took no prisoners and the Americans demanded vengeance, that the regiment decided to insert identifying red feathers in their shako caps to prevent anyone else suffering on their account: hence the nickname the Red Feathers. The regiment went on to fight at the Battle of Monmouth in June 1778 and operations against New Bedford and Martha's Vineyard in September 1778. It sailed for the West Indies in November 1778 and took part in the attack on Saint Lucia and the Battle of Vigie in December 1778. The regiment returned to England and was renamed the 46th (South Devonshire) Regiment of Foot in 1782.

=== Napoleonic Wars ===
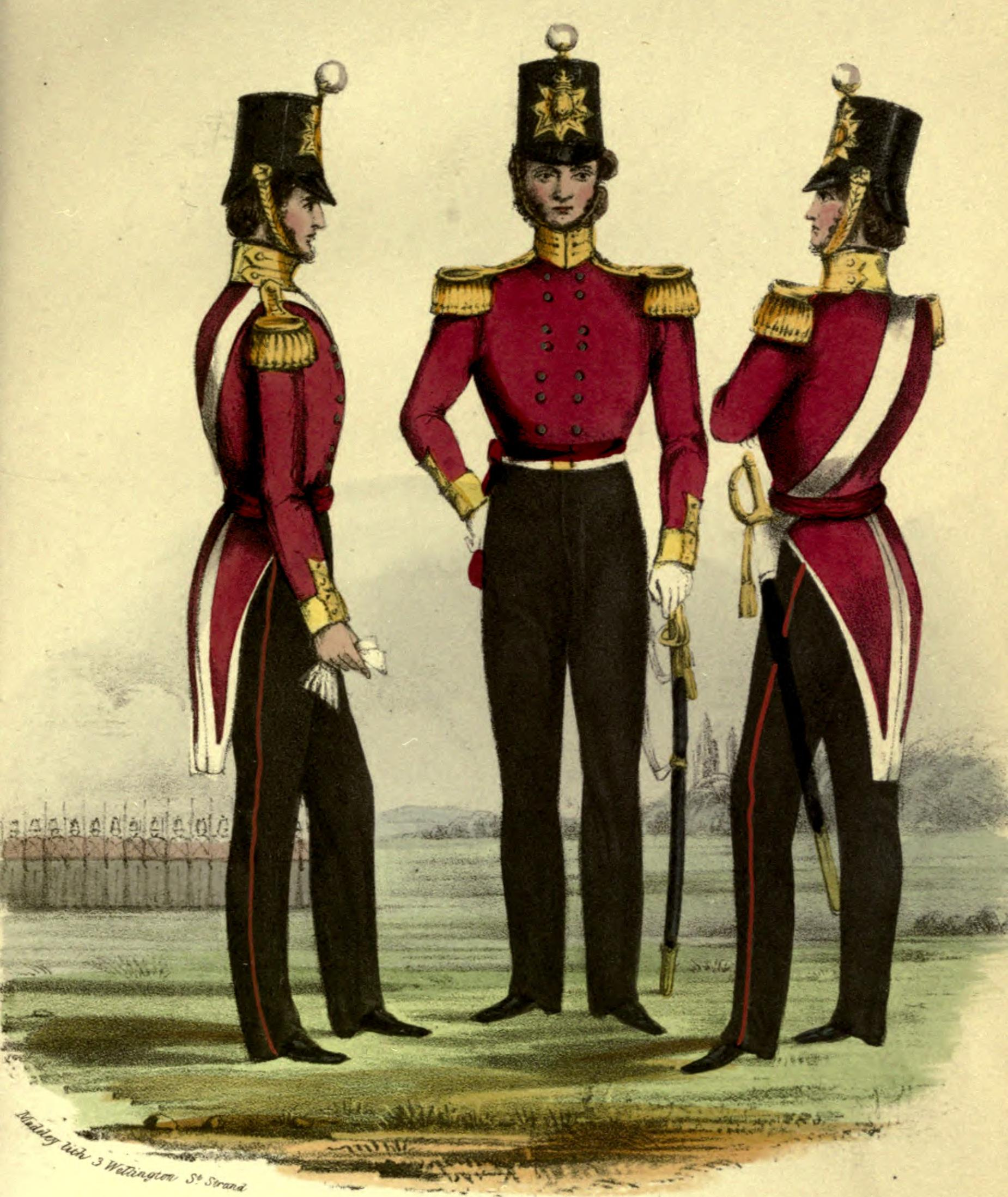
c. 1850 illustration of three regimental officers

The regiment embarked for the West Indies in November 1794 and helped suppress an insurrection by caribs on Saint Vincent before returning home in November 1796. It returned to the West Indies in April 1804 and, fighting alongside the 1st West India Regiment in February 1805, defended Dominica against a French force for over a week until the French abandoned the attack; hence the regiment's first battle honour "Dominica". The regiment took part in another action when in May 1806 when 40 of its soldiers boarded the packet boat Duke of Montrose and set out in pursuit of the French privateers Napoleon and Impériale: they captured the Impériale and its crew. The regiment took part in the invasion of Martinique in February 1809 and then returned to England in December 1811.

=== Colonial Australia ===
The regiment embarked for the British colony of New South Wales in August 1813: they were stationed at Hobart on Van Diemens Land with orders to suppress a gang of bushrangers. In April 1816, Governor Lachlan Macquarie issued orders for the regiment to undertake punitive expeditions against Aboriginal Australians in the Nepean, Hawkesbury and Grose River valleys in New South Wales. The regiment then sailed for Madras in September 1817 and, after a tour on the Indian subcontinent, returned to England in March 1833.

=== Victorian era ===
The regiment was sent to the Crimea in summer 1854 and saw action at the Battle of Alma in September 1854, the Battle of Balaclava in October 1854 and the Battle of Inkerman in November 1854 as well as the Siege of Sebastopol in winter 1854.

As part of the Cardwell Reforms of the 1870s, where single-battalion regiments were linked together to share a single depot and recruiting district in the United Kingdom, the 46th was linked with the 32nd (Cornwall) Regiment of Foot, and assigned to district no. 35 at Victoria Barracks, Bodmin. On 1 July 1881 the Childers Reforms came into effect and the regiment amalgamated with the 32nd (Cornwall) Regiment of Foot to form the Duke of Cornwall's Light Infantry, becoming the 2nd Battalion (with the 32nd (Cornwall) Regiment of Foot becoming the 1st Battalion).

== Battle Honours ==
Battle honours were:

- Dominica (1805)
- Crimean War: Sevastopol

== Colonels ==
Colonels of the regiment were:

- 1741–1743: Brig-Gen. John Price
- 1743–1764: Lt-Gen. Hon. Thomas Murray

=== The 46th Regiment of Foot - (1748) ===
- 1764–1775: Gen. Sir William (Howe), 5th Viscount Howe, KB
- 1775–1795: Lt-Gen. Hon. Sir John Vaughan, KB

=== The 46th (South Devon) Regiment - (1782) ===
- 1795–1804: Gen. Sir James Henry Craig, KB
- 1804–1816: Gen. John Whyte
- 1816–1838: Gen. Henry Wynyard
- 1838–1839: Lt-Gen. Sir John Keane, 1st Baron Keane, GCB, GCH
- 1839–1843: Lt-Gen. John Ross, CB
- 1843–1853: Gen. Sir John Hamilton Dalrymple, Bt., later 8th Earl of Stair, KT
- 1853–1854: Lt-Gen. Richard Egerton, CB
- 1854–1860: Gen. Sir John Pennefather, GCB
- 1860: Lt-Gen. John Geddes, KH
- 1860–1861: Gen. Thomas Gerrard Ball
- 1861–1870: Lt-Gen. Sir Charles Ash Windham, KCB
- 1870:Lt-Gen. Edward Hungerford Delaval Elers Napier
- 1870–1881: Gen. Charles Stuart

== Sources ==
- Burnham, Bob (2010). The British Army Against Napoleon: Facts, Lists and Trivia, 1805-1815. Frontline. ISBN 978-1848325623.
- Cannon, Richard (1851). Historical Record of the Forty-Sixth, or the South Devonshire Regiment of Foot. London: Parker, Furnivall and Parker.
- Chant, Christopher (2013). The Handbook of British Regiments. Routledge Revivals. ISBN 978-0415710763.
