= Little Catherine (1801 ship) =

19th century mainly British ship

History

United Kingdom
- Name: Little Catherine
- Owner: 1809:C. Walker; 1812:Blewett & Co.
- Builder: Bermuda
- Launched: 1801
- Captured: June 1814

United Kingdom
- Name: Blucher
- Namesake: Gebhard Leberecht von Blücher
- Owner: Government Post Office (1815)
- Acquired: 1814 by purchase of a prize
- Fate: Sold 1823

United Kingdom
- Name: Little Catherine
- Owner: Various
- Acquired: 1823 by purchase
- Fate: Last listed 1845
- Acquired: circa 1845 by purchase
- Fate: Wrecked 24 October 1847

General characteristics
- Tons burthen: 18067/94, or 18249/94, or 183, or 185 (bm)
- Length: 83 ft 0 in (25.3 m)
- Beam: 23 ft 10 1/2 in (7.3 m)
- Armament: 1809:12 × 12-pounder carronades; 1812:6 × 12-pounder + 10 × 6-pounder carronades; 1814:10 × 9-pounder guns; 1815:2 × 6-pounder guns

Little Catherine was launched in 1801, at Bermuda, probably under another name. She was condemned in prize in May 1809, at Barbados and entered British registry that year. At that time she traded between Liverpool and Africa. In 1813, she became a temporary packet sailing for the Post Office Packet Service from Falmouth, Cornwall. In 1813, the French Navy captured her and abandoned her after taking off her crew. The Royal Navy recovered her three days later. In 1814, an American privateer captured her but the Royal Navy recaptured her within two weeks. Her owner refused to pay salvage and turned her over to the Post Office, which returned her to use as a Falmouth packet but renamed her Blucher, in honour of Prince Blucher who had helped defeat Napoleon at the Battle of Leipzig in 1813. The government sold Blucher in 1823. New owners returned her to the name Little Catherine and she continued to sail widely until she was last listed in 1845, having been sold to a Chinese owner. She was wrecked in October 1847.

== Little Catherine ==
Little Catherine was condemned in prize at Barbados on 9 May 1809. Some reports suggest that she had been a slave ship, though there is no record of a slaver by that name in the most complete database of the trans-Atlantic slave trade. She may have been sailing under another name and ostensibly under non-British colours, but have been captured and condemned for violating the Slave Trade Act 1807 that prohibited British vessels from engaging in the slave trade.

Little Catherine first entered Lloyd's Register in 1809, with C. Walker, master, Taylor & Co., owner, and trade Liverpool–Africa. In 1812 the Register of Shipping showed Little Catherine with Irvine, master, Bluet & Co., owner, but trade Liverpool–Africa. The 1813 Lloyd's Register showed Little Catherine with C. Walker, master, changing to Jeffrey, Taylor & Co., owner, and trade Liverpool–Africa, but changing to Falmouth packet. Lloyd's Register for 1814 showed Little Catherine with Jeffrey, master, changing to Richards, Blewett & Co. owners, and trade Falmouth packet.

However, the Post Office had engaged Little Catherine and appointed John Vivian as her captain on 13 March 1813. On 25 November, the French frigates Sultane and Étoile captured Little Catherine as she was sailing from Passages. (Note: One source gives the name of the companion frigate as Otter, but the French navy had no vessel by that name at any time between 1786 and 1861. Newspaper accounts identified the second frigate as Étoile.) The French took off Little Catherine's crew and abandoned her. On 28 November, HMS Hotspur picked her up at sea. (Note: A first-class share of the salvage money was worth £46 10s 9½d; a sixth-class share, that of an ordinary seaman, was worth £9 6s 2d.) Hotspur found her plundered, all but two of her guns thrown overboard, with her sails set, but her rudder free so that she drifted at the mercy of wind and waves. Captain the Honourable Jocelny Percy of Hotspur put a crew on board who took her into Penzance. A gale on the 30th upset her and put her on her beam ends, where she lay waterlogged.

While Captain Vivian was on board Sultana a storm came up. Her crew consisted of untrained landsmen, many of whom were sea-sick. Sultana's captain appealed to Vivian for assistance. Vivian agreed that he and his men would navigate the frigate, handing back control when the weather moderated. In return, the frigate captain agreed to put the Englishmen aboard the next prize they took.

When the French captured the Falmouth packet Duke of Montrose on 12 December, they put Captain Vivian and Little Catherine's crew aboard Duke of Montrose. Captain Vivian was senior in the Packet Service to Captain John Forster of Duke of Montrose and so assumed command. The French also put on board their prisoners from some other vessels they had taken. The British reached Falmouth on 20 December. The commanders of both vessels assured the Packet Service's agent at Falmouth that they had sunk the Service's book of private (confidential) signals with the mails before the French had captured the vessels.

Captain John Richards was appointed captain of Little Catherine on 16 April 1814.

On 9 May, Little Catherine sailed from Falmouth, bound for Madeira, Teneriffe, and the Brazils. The privateer Herald, of New York, 17 guns and 110 men, captured her on 13 June, at 41°6′N 12°8′W, off Oporto. Herald put Little Catherine's crew aboard a Russian vessel that delivered them to Madeira. HMS Constant carried them from Madeira to Penzance, where they landed in early June.

The British frigate HMS Lacedaemonian recaptured Little Catherine on 25 June, within two miles of the Charlestown bar and sent her into Bermuda. She sailed from Bermuda on 18 July, and arrived at Falmouth on 2 August. (Note: A list of captures described her as the "American brig Little Catherine packet, of 4 guns, 140 tons, and 9 men, from Falmouth, captured by the Lacedemonian, June 25, 1514. A first-class share of the salvage money was worth £35 7s 4d; a sixth-class share, that of an ordinary seaman, was worth 6s 4½d.)

The Court of Enquiry reprimanded Captain Richards, stating that he should have kept more to the wind and that he should have used the brass guns in his stern ports. It barred him from reappointment to command of packets. Mr. Blewitt, Little Catherine's owner, refused to pay the salvage for her and handed her over to the Post Office.

== Blucher ==
Blucher first appeared in Lloyd's Register in the 1815 listing of Falmouth packets with Price, master, and Government Post Office as owner. The Post Office employed her for captains waiting until their new packets were launched.

There are readily accessible records of voyages across the North Atlantic.

- On 15 August 1816, Blucher, Eddy, master, sailed from Falmouth. She reached Halifax, Nova Scotia, on 9 September. She next sailed to New York, and then arrived back at Falmouth on 9 December 1816.
- Blucher, Richards, master, sailed from Falmouth on 15 April 1819, and arrived at Halifax on 20 May. She sailed to New York, returned to Halifax, and arrived back at Falmouth on 10 August 1819.
- On 12 July 1820, Blucher, Anderson, master (acting), sailed from Falmouth. She arrive at Halifax on 20 August. HMS Cyrene carried on to Bermuda the mails for Bermuda that Blucher had brought. Blucher sailed to New York, back to Halifax, and then arrived back at Falmouth on 19 November.
- On 13 November 1820, Blucher, White, master, rescued the three survivors of the seven-man crew of the schooner Plover, which had foundered on 24 October, at 41°N 31°W. Plover had been sailing from Newfoundland at the time of her loss. Blucher brought the survivors into Falmouth.

Blucher also sailed to the Caribbean and South America. On 10 March 1817, Blucher arrived at Barbados from Falmouth, and arrived at Jamaica on 20 March. On 23 May, she arrived at Falmouth, having sailed from Jamaica on 7 April.

Blucher sailed from Falmouth on 14 September, arrived at Madeira on 28 September, and sailed the next day for Tenriffe. She arrived at Bahia from Pernambuco on 4 November 1817, sailed for Rio de Janeiro on the 6th, and arrived there on 16 November. She arrived back at Falmouth on 7 February 1818, having left Rio on 12 December 1817.

Blucher arrived at Barbados on 12 April 1818, from Falmouth. She arrived back at Falmouth on 5 October 1818, from the Leeward Islands, having left St Thomas on 8 September.

Disposal: The "Principal Officers and Commissioners of His Majesty's Navy" offered the "Blucher Packet Vessel... lying at Falmouth" for sale on 16 December 1823.

== Little Catherine ==
Little Catherine, of 185 tons burthen and built in Bermuda in 1802 [sic] appeared in the 1825 volume of LR. In March 1824, new owners returned Little Catherine (the former Blucher), to her former name.

Year	Master	Owner	Trade	Source & notes
1825	Wakeham	A. Hunt	Cork–Newfoundland	LR; large repair 1817 & repaired sides and new sides 1824
1830	R.Lavie; M'Clain	J.Hunt	Dartmouth–Labrador	LR; large repair 1817 & repaired sides and new sides 1824

On 16 April 1829, Arthur Hunt, merchant, administrator of the estate and effects of John Henry Hunt, merchant, Dartmouth, deceased, sold John Henry Hunt's full ownership of Little Catherine to C. and E. Hunt and Co. Little Catherine was registered at Bristol on 1 May 1829, with Edward Hunt, Charles Hunt, and Edward Henley, merchants and co-partners trading as C. and E. Hunt and Co., Bristol. Her masters were Thomas Wakeman (Dartmouth; 13 May 1829), Robert Larica (18 June 1830), James McLean (20 August 1831), and Philip Willis (16 April 1829).

On 23 September 1833, Little Catherine was sold to John Croft, merchant, of Liverpool. She was registered at Liverpool on 26 May 1834.

Year	Master	Owner	Trade	Source & notes
1833	P.Willis	J.Hunt & Co.	Bristol–Newfoundland	LR; large repair 1817, repaired sides 824, and new sides 1825
1834	P.Willis; J.Copp	F.Barnes	Liverpool–London	LR; homeport changed from Bristol to London

In 1834, Little Catherine was advertised to carry emigrants to the Swan River Colony, Hobart, and New South Wales. However, a dispute arose as to her age, origins, and condition. There were accusations that she was older than advertised, with poor accommodations for passengers, and partly rotten. She apparently did not sail on the proposed emigrant voyage. Instead she sailed to the Bahamas and possibly the South Seas.

Year	Master	Owner	Trade	Source & notes
1836	J.Copp	F.Barnes	London	LR; damages repaired 1835
1838	Hogarth	Murray & Co.	London–New South Wales	LR; damages repaired 1835
1840	Jones	G.Castle; Manning & Co.	Liverpool; London	LR; large repair 1840

In 1838, Little Catherine did sail to New South Wales. Then in 1840, she was sold to the Trinidad and Sabine Company, which advertised that she was ready to take emigrants from England to Texas. Instead she was sold again and chartered to carry a group of settlers to the Musquito Shore. She was at Deal on 10 March 1841, preparing to sail. She returned and around 10 August 1842, sailed for Hong Kong with Franklyn, master. Later she was reported in Singapore, having come from China and sailing to Bombay.

A court case in 1847, revealed that the voyage to the Mosquito Coast had been part of a scheme by the Segovia Company, a company ostensibly organized to establish a colony at Nueva Segovia (River Bluefields). The expedition was arrested on 31 August, by the government of New Grenada, released on 22 October, and returned unsuccessful to England in June 1842.[[Special:AbuseFilter/Though less flamboyant, the venture and its outcome were reminiscent of Gregor Macgregor's 1821 Poyais scheme.|Though less flamboyant, the venture and its outcome were reminiscent of Gregor Macgregor's 1821 Poyais scheme.]]

Year	Master	Owner	Trade	Source & notes
1842	Franklyn	Manning	London–China	LR; large repair 1840 & small repairs 1842

== Fate ==
Little Catherine was last listed in LR in 1845. She had been sold to a Chinese owner who converted her to a lugger. She sailed in early September 1847, from Singapore for Hong Kong with an English master, Victor Howes, and local crew. By his account the local crew took control of the vessel and ran her ashore around Longitude 16½° in the Gulf of Tonquin on the coast of Cochinchina on 24 October. A survivor's account was that she struck a rock after she became unsteerable in a gale.
