= HMS Wasp (1800) =

Sloop of the Royal Navy

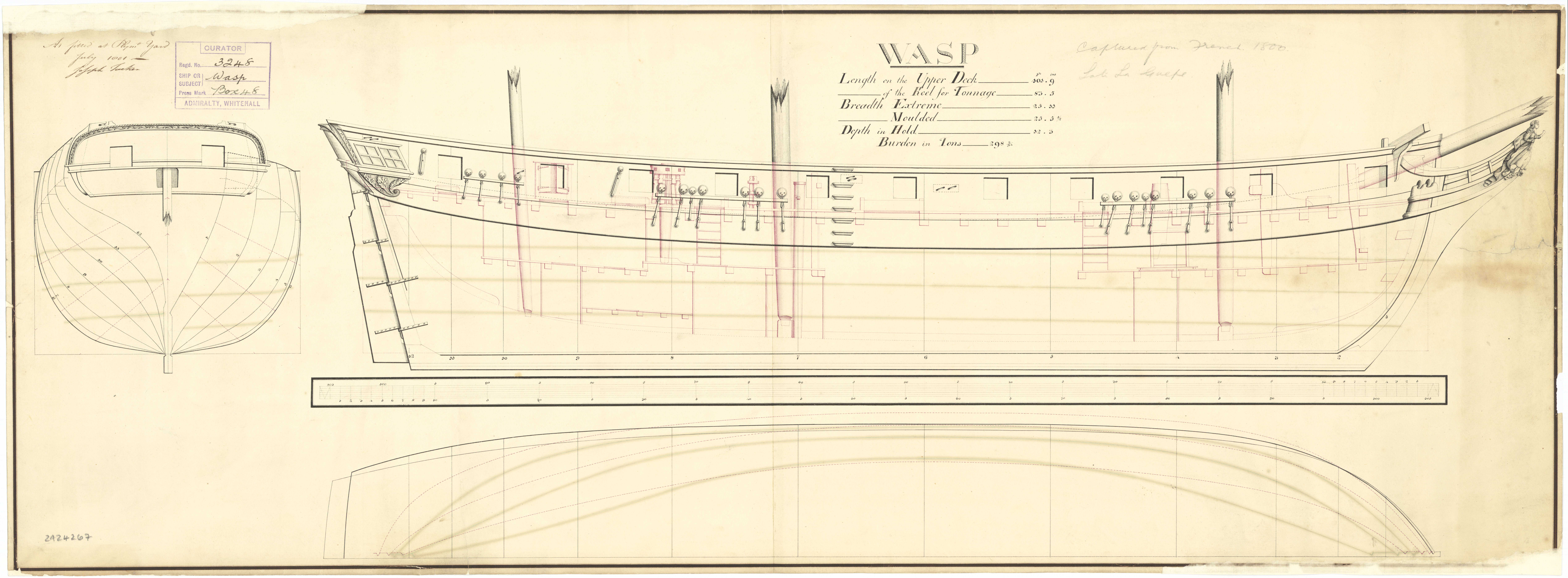
- Wasp

History

France
- Name: Guêpe
- Builder: Bordeaux
- Launched: 1798
- Captured: 29 August 1800, by the Royal Navy

Great Britain
- Name: HMS Wasp
- Acquired: 29 August 1800
- Fate: Sold on 17 April 1811

General characteristics
- Class & type: 18-gun sloop
- Tons burthen: 2982/94 (bm)
- Length: Overall:101 ft 9 in (31.0 m); Kwwl:83 ft 5 in (25.4 m)
- Beam: 25 ft 11 in (7.9 m)
- Depth of hold: 12 ft 2 in (3.7 m)
- Propulsion: Sails
- Sail plan: Full-rigged ship
- Complement: 105
- Armament: 16 × 24-pounder carronades + 2 × 9-pounder chase guns

HMS Wasp was an 18-gun sloop of the British Royal Navy. She was formerly the French naval brig Guêpe, (guêpe is the French for wasp) which the Navy captured in 1800. She served during the French Revolutionary and Napoleonic Wars, and was sold out of naval service in 1811.

== Capture ==
Guêpe was a brig built at Bordeaux in 1798 that operated against British shipping in the Atlantic. On 29 August 1800 the vessels of the British blockading squadron, which was under the command of Sir John Warren, sent their boats into the harbour at Vigo to attack and cut her out.

The boarding party went in and, after a 15-minute fight, captured Guêpe; they then towed her out. She had a flush deck and was pierced for 20 guns but carried eighteen 9-pounders. She and her crew of 161 men were under the command of Citizen Dupan. In the attack she lost 25 men killed, including Dupan, and 40 wounded. British casualties amounted to four killed, 23 wounded and one missing. (Note: A first-class share of the prize money was worth £42 19s 6½d; a fifth-class share, that of a seaman, was worth 1s 9½d.) In 1847 the Admiralty awarded the Naval General Service Medal with clasp "29 Aug. Boat Service 1800" to all surviving claimants from the action.

A prize crew took Guêpe back to Portsmouth where the Admiralty fitted her out between October 1800 and August 1801. During this time she was re-rigged.

== British career ==
Now named HMS Wasp she was commissioned in July 1801 under Commander Charles Bullen, and sent to Sierra Leone at the end of the year. At Freetown, Bullen landed guns and sailors to reinforce soldiers and militias composed of free blacks resettled from Nova Scotia and Jamaica (the Maroons), who were engaged in a campaign against the local Temne people. After the Temne signed a peace treaty in December and the situation had settled down, in March 1802 Wasp sailed from Sierra Leone. She sailed to the West Indies where she was paid off in July.

Wasp recommissioned again in May 1803 under Commander Frederick Whitworth Aylmer, and on 19 July that year captured the privateer Despoir. Despoir was a lugger, pierced for 10 guns but only mounting two. She had a crew of 28 men under the command of Jean Delaballe. She was three days out of Hodierne and had made no captures. At the time Seahorse was in company with Wasp.

Aylmer sailed to the Mediterranean in June 1804. In August Wasp captured a Spanish lugger and sloop. The French privateer Venus recaptured these vessels, only to be herself captured by several East Indiamen, notably Eliza Ann. Venus had five crewmen from Wasp on board as prisoners.

On 12 and 16 January 1805, Wasp, under Alymer, captured the Spanish brigs Minerva and Carmen, and their cargoes. About two weeks later, on 21 February, Wasp captured the Spanish ship Victoria, and her cargo.

Aylmer was succeeded by Lieutenant Joseph Packwood in an acting capacity, and he by Commander John Simpson, also in 1805. Wasp was with Sir John Orde's squadron patrolling off Cádiz, and had a narrow escape from a French squadron in August 1805.

The slave ship Lancaster, Robinson, master, was sailing from Africa to the West Indies when on 30 November a French privateer captured her. Wasp recaptured Lancaster and sent her into Barbados. Lancaster had had four men killed and nine wounded when she was captured.

On 12 December, Boadicea, Arethusa and Wasp left Cork, escorting a convoy of 23 merchant vessels. Four days later the convoy encountered a French squadron consisting of five ships of the line and four sailing frigates, as well as nine other vessels that were too far away for assessment. The letter writer to the Naval Chronicle surmised that the distant vessels were the Africa squadron that Lark had escorted and that the French had captured. On this occasion, the British warships and six merchant vessels went one way and the rest went another way. The French chased the warships and the six for a day, ignored the 17, and eventually gave up their pursuit. Boadicea then shadowed the French while Wasp went back to French and Spanish coasts to alert the British warships there. Arethusa and her six charges encountered the French squadron again the next day, but after a desultory pursuit the French sailed off.

Lieutenant Buckland Sterling Bluett of Scorpion received promotion to Commander and took over command of Wasp in 1806. He then sailed to the Leeward Islands. On 24 May she came across the former British cutter HMS Dominica, which had been taken by mutineers four days earlier and delivered to the French, who had immediately commissioned her under the name Napoléon and sent her out to capture some merchant vessels at Roseau. Wasp retook the cutter, which had on board 73 men under the command of Vincent Gautier, two of whom were killed before she surrendered.

Napoléon had been in company with the French naval schooner Impériale. That evening the packet ship Duke of Montrose engaged Impériale, which enabled Cygnet, which had been in company with Wasp, to come up. As Cygnet arrived, Impériale surrendered to Duke of Montrose. The Royal Navy took Impériale into service as HMS Vigilant.

In 1807 Commander William Parkinson took command of Wasp. She returned to Britain later that year under the command of Commander John Haswell.

== Fate ==
Wasp was laid up at Deptford in May 1809. She was offered for sale on 13 December 1810, and was sold there on 17 May 1811.
