= French schooner Impériale (1805) =

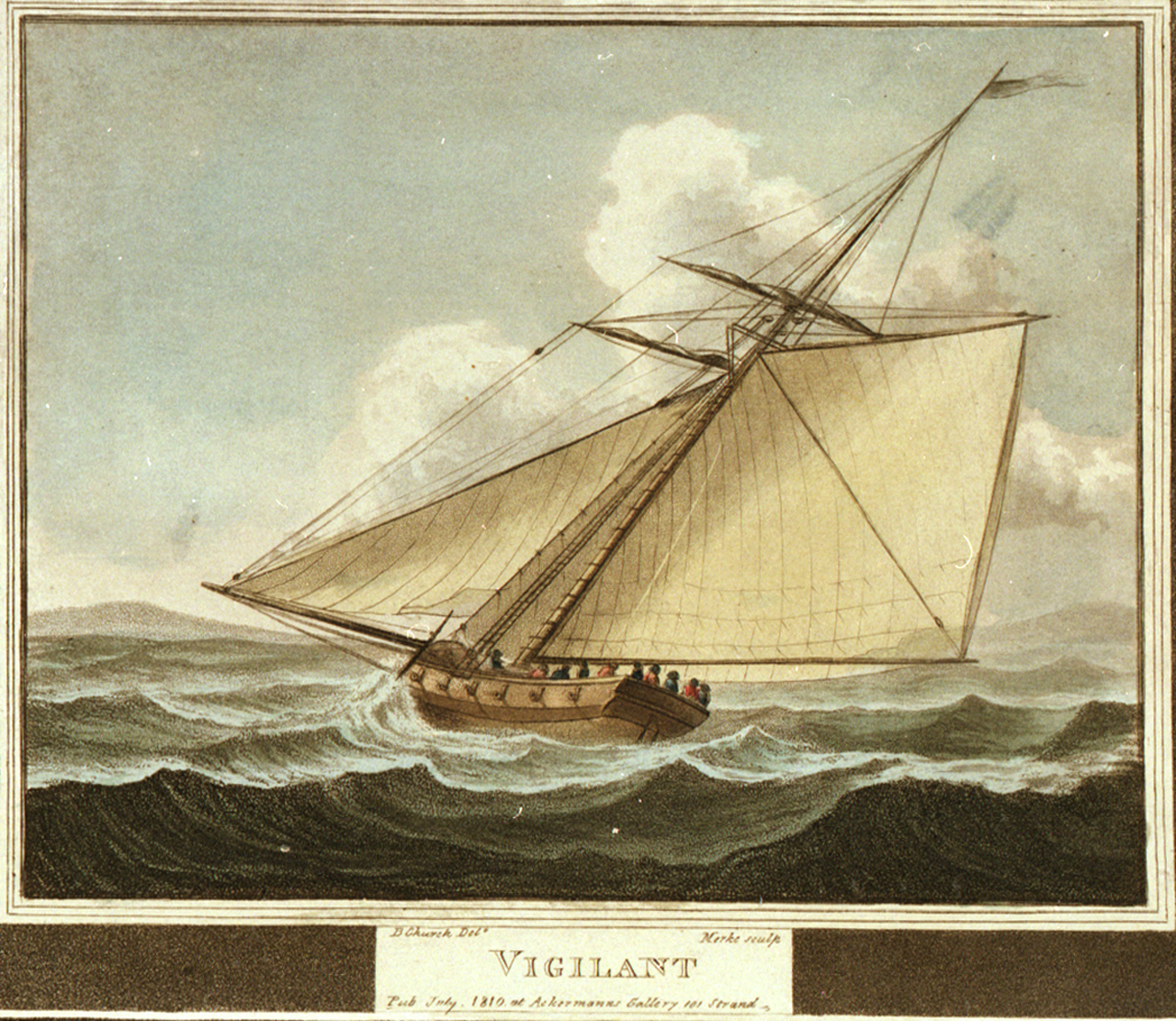
- HMS Vigilant

History

France
- Name: Impériale (or Impériale)
- Commissioned: 23 September 1805
- Captured: 24 May 1806 by the Royal Navy

United Kingdom
- Name: HMS Vigilant
- Acquired: 24 May 1806
- Renamed: HMS Subtle (20 November 1806)
- Fate: Wrecked 26 October 1807

General characteristics
- Tons burthen: 102 (bm)
- Propulsion: Sails
- Sail plan: Schooner
- Complement: At capture:65; British:50
- Armament: At capture: 7 guns; British service: 12 guns

The French schooner Impériale was a 3-gun mercantile schooner-aviso of the French Navy commissioned at Guadeloupe on 23 September 1805. The Royal Navy captured her on 24 May 1806 and named her HMS Vigilant. The Navy renamed her HMS Subtle on 20 November 1806. She wrecked at Bermuda on 20 October 1807.

== Capture ==
On 23 May 1806, Impériale left Saintes to capture some merchant vessels at Roseau. The former British cutter HMS Dominica, which mutineers had taken four days earlier and delivered to the French at Basse-Terre, joined her. (The French had immediately commissioned Dominica under the name Napoléon, and put 75 men aboard her. At Roseau they managed to take one vessel that the British later recaptured.

The next day, His Majesty's sloop Cygnet was anchored at Prince Rupert's Bay, Dominica, when Robert Bell Campbell, Cygnet's captain, received information that a cutter and a schooner were nearby. He immediately made the appropriate signals to HMS Wasp, which was entering the bay.

By 2p.m. Wasp had recaptured Dominica. As Cygnet chased Impériale, the packet ship Duke of Montrose joined the chase and at 8pm engaged Impériale. As Cygnet came up, Impériale surrendered to Duke of Montrose. Impériale was armed with three guns and had a crew of 65 men under the command of a lieutenant de vaisseau.

Impériale was carrying General Hortrade, not in uniform, and 50 soldiers of the 26th Brigade. Duke of Montrose, Captain Birt Dynely (or Dyneley), which had been with the convoy in Roseau roads, and had sailed out in pursuit of the two French vessels, had taken on board Lieutenant Wallis and 40 soldiers from the 46th Regiment of Foot. (Note: Lloyd's Patriotic Fund awarded Dynely with a silver vase worth £50. However, he was killed in 1808 in an engagement with the French privateer Confiance, which captured Duke of Montrose. The vase ended up in the ownership of the Falmouth Town Council and now is on display in the Falmouth Packet Gallery at the National Maritime Museum of Cornwall.) (Note: Other accounts give the soldiers as 23 men from the 46th Foot, and 13 from the 3rd West India Regiment.)

== Loss ==
The Royal Navy took Impériale into service as HMS Vigilant, and commissioned her under the command of Lieutenant William Dowers. However, there was already a schooner Vigilant in service, so on 20 November the Navy renamed the ex-Impériale HMS Subtle.

Subtle was sailing from the Delaware Capes to Barbados when Lieutenant Dowers decided to make for Bermuda as she was short of fresh water and had developed an annoying leak in her breadroom. On 25 October 1807, as Subtle sailed through the St George's Channel, sounding her way continuously, she nevertheless grounded. Despite attempts to lighten her, Subtle was soon on her side. She had run onto a reef 8 nautical miles (15 km; 9.2 mi) west-northwest of Somerset Island, Bermuda. A current had driven her some 20 nautical miles (37 km; 23 mi) from where Dowers had believed her to be. The wreck occurred at approximately 32°16′40″N 65°02′20″W. The crew used Subtle's boats to save themselves and there were no deaths.
