= John Houlton Marshall =

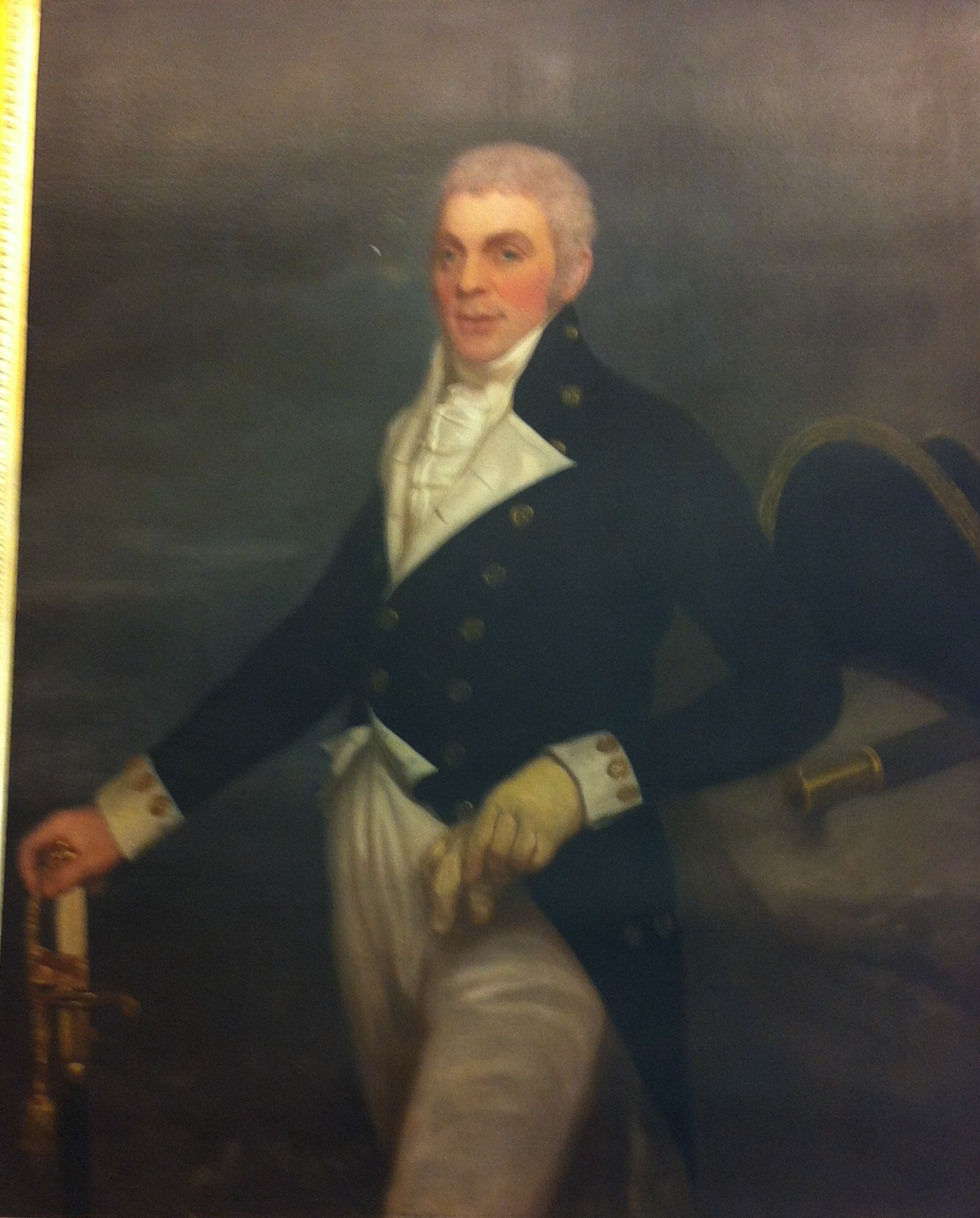
- John Houlton Marshall, Province House
- Born: 9 October 1768; Halifax, Nova Scotia
- Died: 2 May 1837 (aged 68); Bloomsbury Square, London
- Military career
- Allegiance: United Kingdom
- Branch: Royal Navy
- Service years: 1778–1837
- Rank: Commander
- Commands: HMS Halcyon
- Conflicts: American Revolutionary War; French Revolutionary War; Action of 16 October 1799; Napoleonic Wars; Battle of Trafalgar

John Houlton Marshall (9 October 1768 in Halifax, Nova Scotia – 2 May 1837 in Charlotte Street, Bloomsbury Square, Middlesex) was a Nova Scotian who was a naval officer at the Battle of Trafalgar during the Napoleonic Wars.

== Career ==
John Houlton Marshall was the son of Elias Marshall, master shipwright, of H.M. Careening Yard, Halifax. He entered the Royal Navy in 1778. He was promoted to lieutenant on 30 June 1794 and by 1799 was serving as first lieutenant of the 38-gun frigate HMS Naiad. As such he fought at the Action of 16 October 1799 where Naiad and three other British frigates captured two Spanish frigates which were transporting large amounts of treasure. Marshall was still serving in Naiad on 17 May 1801 when he commanded a cutting out expedition at Pontevedra which captured the Spanish packet l'Alcudia and destroyed her consort El Raposo. On 13 July 1804 he joined the 100-gun ship of the line HMS Britannia, and he fought on board her at the Battle of Trafalgar on 21 October 1805. His share of the prize money was 65 pounds 11s 5d plus a Parliamentary Award of 161 pounds.

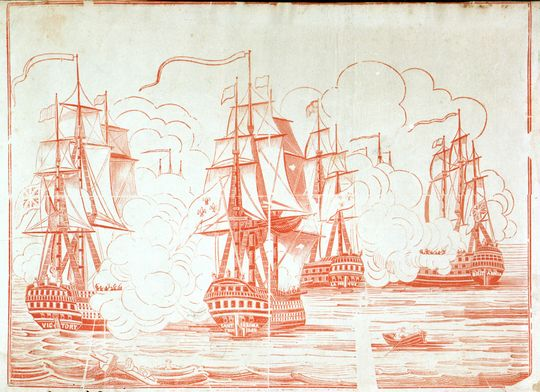
The Battle of Trafalgar, 21 October 1805; Britannia (left)

By 1810 Marshall was serving as first lieutenant of HMS Africa and on 21 October he was promoted to commander at a ceremony held to commemorate the Battle of Trafalgar. He was later given command of the 18-gun brig-sloop HMS Halcyon, and survived her sinking on 19 May 1814 on reef rocks in Anato Bay, Jamaica.

== See also ==
- Military history of Nova Scotia
