= Ponsonby (1796 ship) =

British merchant ship, privateer, and slave ship (1796–1806)

History

Great Britain
- Name: Ponsonby
- Namesake: Ponsonby, Cumbria
- Launched: 1796, Liverpool
- Captured: Late 1805 or early 1806

General characteristics
- Tons burthen: 101 (bm)
- Complement: 40
- Armament: 14 × 6-pounder guns

Ponsonby was launched in 1796 at Liverpool. She initially traded between Liverpool and Dublin, and then between 1801 and 1804 disappeared from Lloyd's Register. She returned to the register in 1805 as she sailed as a privateer for two or so months, capturing two vessels. She then became a slave ship in the triangular trade on enslaved people. The French Navy captured her in late 1804 or early 1805 before she could embark any captives.

== Career ==
Ponsonby first appeared in Lloyd's Register (LR), in 1797.

| Year | Master | Owner | Trade | Source |
|---|---|---|---|---|
| 1797 | Pemberton | G.Brown | Liverpool–Dublin | LR |

Between 1801 and 1804, Ponsonby disappeared from Lloyd's Register. She reappeared in 1805 with new masters, owners, and trades.

| Year | Master | Owner | Trade | Source |
|---|---|---|---|---|
| 1805 | M.Trott; J.Brown | Sake & Co. Ratcliffe | Liverpool cruizer Liverpool–Africa | LR |

Captain Matthew Fiott acquired a letter of marque on 29 June 1805. He sailed Ponsonby as a privateer.

In May 1805 Lloyd's List reported that the privateer Ponsonby, of Liverpool, had detained and sent into Liverpool Fabius, Atkins, master, which had been sailing from Bordeaux to America.

In June Lloyd's List reported that the privateer Ponsonby had detained and sent into Liverpool Young Josias, Jurgens, master. Yong Josias had been on he way from Amsterdam to St Lucars.

After this relatively brief foray into privateering, Ponsonby'trade changed to that of transporting enslaved people. Captain John Brown sailed from Liverpool on 7 November 1805, bound for Africa.

== Fate ==
Lloyd's List reported in April 1806 that a French squadron consisting of an 84-gun ship-of-the-line and three frigates had captured Lord Nelson, Trio, and the sloop-of-war HMS Favourite off the coast of Africa.

Lloyd's List reported that prior to 26 January, L'Hermite's squadron of the French Navy captured off the coast of Africa Lord Nelson, Darnault, master, Laurel, Hume, master, Ponsonby, Brown, master, Juverna, Brassey, master, Wells, Hughes, master, and Active, of London, Wiley, master. The French put all the captured crews on Active and sent her back to England. The squadron burnt the other vessels that they had captured. The captains arrived at Waterford on 12 May on the cartel Active.

The same squadron also captured Sarah, Otway, Mary, Adams, master, and Nelson, Meath, master.

In 1805, 30 British slave ships were lost. In 1806, 33 British slave ships were lost. In 1805, 13 were lost off the coast of Africa; in 1806, two. War, not maritime hazards nor slave resistance, was the greatest cause of vessel losses among British slave vessels.
