= Juverna (1804 ship) =

UK slave ship (1804–1806)

History

United Kingdom
- Name: Juverna
- Namesake: Juverna
- Launched: 1804, Portaferry
- Captured: December 1805

General characteristics
- Tons burthen: 82 (bm)
- Sail plan: Schooner
- Armament: 8 × 4-pounder + 2 × 9-pounder guns
- Notes: Part fir

Juverna was a schooner launched at Portaferry in 1804. She immediately became a slave ship in the triangular trade in enslaved people. She made one complete slave voyage. A French squadron captured her in late 1805 or early 1806, before she could embark any slaves on her second slave voyage.

== Career ==
Juverna first appeared in Lloyd's Register (LR) in 1804.

Year	Master	Owner	Trade	Source
1804	R.Lewis	H.Clark	Liverpool–Africa	LR

1st voyage transporting enslaved people (1804–1805): Captain Robert Lewis sailed from Liverpool on 29 July 1804. In 1804, 147 vessels sailed from English ports, bound for the trade in enslaved people; 120 of these vessels sailed from Liverpool.

Lewis acquired captives at Calabar. Juverna arrived at Suriname on 1 April 1805, with 89 captives. She had taken on 110 male and female captives, two of whom died before she left Africa. On her way to the West Indies she stopped at Prince's Island to allow the captives to bathe. During the voyage to Suriname another 19 captives died.

At Suriname the ship's doctor and nine seamen deserted. She sailed from Suriname on 12 June 1805. She sailed in convoy. During her voyage to the United Kingdom HMS Leander pressed one of her crew. Juverna arrived back at Liverpool on 23 July. She had left with 20 crew members and had suffered four crew deaths on her voyage. She brought 145 bags of sugar and 58 bales of cotton from Suriname.

Year	Master	Owner	Trade	Source
1805	R.Lewis; T.Brassey	H.Clarke	Liverpool–Africa	LR

2nd voyage transporting enslaved people (1805–loss): Captain Thomas Brassey sailed from Liverpool on 16 November 1805.

== Loss ==
Lloyd's List reported in April 1806 that a French squadron consisting of an 84-gun ship-of-the-line and three frigates had captured Lord Nelson, Trio, and the sloop-of-war HMS Favourite off the coast of Africa.

Lloyd's List reported that prior to 26 January L'Hermite's squadron of the French Navy captured off the coast of Africa Lord Nelson, Darnault, master, Laurel, Hume, master, Ponsonby, Brown, master, Juverna, Brassey, master, Wells, Hughes, master, and Active, of London, Wiley, master. The French put all the captured crews on Active and sent her back to England. Juverna had left Liverpool with 17 crew members and had suffered one crew death on her voyage. The squadron burnt the other vessels that they had captured. The captains arrived at Waterford on 12 May, on the cartel Active.

The same squadron also captured Sarah, Otway, Mary, Adams, master, and Nelson, Meath, master.
