= Plover (1788 ship) =

History

United Kingdom
- Name: Plover
- Owner: 1802:Ward & Co.; 1804:Baird & Co.
- Launched: 1788, Liverpool
- Fate: Captured 1806

General characteristics
- Tons burthen: 306 (bm)
- Propulsion: Sail
- Complement: 1803:45; 1805:35
- Armament: 1803:20 × 6-pounder guns; 1805:16 × 6-pounder guns

Plover was launched at Liverpool in 1788. Her whereabouts between 1798 and 1802 are currently obscure. She became a Liverpool-based slave ship in 1802. She made three voyages in the triangular trade, carrying enslaved people from West Africa to the West indies. The French Navy captured her in 1806 as she was starting her fourth voyage to acquire captives. The French Navy may have commissioned her as a corvette, but if so her service was brief.

== Career ==
Plover first appears under that name in Lloyd's Register in 1802 with J. Brown, master, and Ward & Co. owners. (Note: The notes to the entry indicate that Plover had undergone repairs in 1800. Later editions make clear that she was lengthened at that time. The 1802 entry gives her burthen as 205 tons; later editions give it as 306 tons. That Plover's whereabouts between 1788 and 1802 are currently obscure suggests that she had been launched under another name, and perhaps renamed at a change in ownership at the time of her lengthening. One source on ships built in Liverpool makes no mention of a vessel named Plover being built during the relevant period. Absent original research, that question currently cannot be definitively resolved.)

== 1st voyage transporting enslaved people (1802–1803) ==
Captain John Brown sailed from Liverpool on 26 June 1802, bound for the Bight of Biafra and Gulf of Guinea islands. In 1802, 155 vessels sailed from English ports, bound to Africa to acquire and transport enslaved people; 134 of these vessels sailed from Liverpool.

Plover acquired captives at New Calabar. She stopped first at the Bahamas, but then delivered 313 captives to Havana, arriving there on 17 December. Plover sailed for England on 6 March 1803 and arrived at Liverpool on 9 April. She had left Liverpool with 33 crew members and suffered four crew deaths on her voyage.

== 2nd voyage transporting enslaved people (1803–1804) ==
Captain Brown acquired a letter of marque on 23 May 1803. He sailed from Liverpool on 2 June 1803. In 1803, 99 vessels sailed from English ports, bound to Africa to acquire and transport enslaved people; 83 of these vessels sailed from Liverpool.

Plover acquired captives at New Calabar. On this voyage, though, she took the captives to Kingston, Jamaica. Captain Brown died on 4 December, before she arrived at Kingston. Plover arrived there on 23 December 1803, with 309 captives. Plover sailed from Jamaica on 23 March 1804, and arrived at Liverpool on 21 May. She had left Liverpool with 45 crew members, and two had died on her voyage.

== 3rd voyage transporting enslaved people (1804–1805) ==
Captain Brown Sailed from Liverpool on 27 July 1804, bound for the Bight of Biafra and Gulf of Guinea islands. In 1804, 147 vessels sailed from English ports, bound to Africa to acquire and transport enslaved people; 126 of these vessels sailed from Liverpool.

Plover acquired captives at Bonny and arrived at Kingston on 10 February 1805. Brown had embarked 278 slaves and disembarked 250, for a loss rate of 10.1%. Plover sailed for England on 20 April 1805 and arrived at Liverpool on 5 July. Sh had left Liverpool with 38 crew members, and six died on the voyage.

Lloyd's Register for 1805 showed her master changing from J. Brown to Cummins and her owner from Ward & Co. to Braid & Co.

== 4th voyage transporting enslaved people (1805–loss) ==
Captain John Cummins acquired a letter of marque on 30 July 1805 He sailed from Liverpool on 25 September 1805.

Lloyd's List reported that Plover, Cummings. master, had put into Lisbon on 12 October.

== Fate ==
In 1806 the French frigate Cybèle was part of a squadron under Commodore Jean-Marthe-Adrien L'Hermite, along with the 74-gun Régulus, the frigate Président and the brig-corvette Surveillant. During L'Hermite's expedition, she took part in the capture of the brig HMS Favourite and of about 20 merchantmen, notably Otway and Plowers.

The French captured Plover before she had embarked any captives. On 13 June 1806, Lloyd's List reported that the French L'Orient Squadron had captured Aurora, Bridge, master, and Plover, of Liverpool, Cummings, master, off the coast of Africa. The French put both crews on Aurora, which then returned to Liverpool.

In 1806, 33 British vessels in the triangular trade were lost; 23 of these vessels were lost off the coast of Africa. During the period 1793 to 1807, war, rather than maritime hazards or resistance by the captives, was the greatest cause of vessel losses among British enslaving vessels.

The French took Plover back to France. The Navy may have commissioned her as Plowers, but if so, only briefly. Her ultimate fate is unknown.
