= Laurel (1802 ship) =

UK merchant and slave ship (1802–1806)

History

United Kingdom
- Name: Laurel
- Namesake: Lauraceae
- Captured: Late 1805, or early 1806

General characteristics
- Tons burthen: 174 or 180, or 188 (bm)
- Complement: 1804: 30; 1805: 25
- Armament: 1802: 4 × 4-pounder guns; 1804: 10 × 12-pounder carronades; 1805: 11 × 12-pounder cannons

Laurel's origins are ambiguous. She first appeared in online British sources in 1802. She made three voyages from Liverpool to Africa. On the first she apparently was on a trading voyage. The second was a complete voyage as a slave ship in the triangular trade in enslaved people. During this voyage she was involved in two sanguinary engagements with French vessels, the second of which resulted in the death of her master. She set out in 1805 on a second voyage to transport enslaved people, but a French squadron captured her before she had embarked any captives.

== Career ==
Laurel first appeared in Lloyd's Register (LR) and the Register of Shipping (RS) in 1802. Both agree on her burthen, master, and trade. They disagree on ownership and origins.

Year	Master	Owner	Trade	Source
1802	T.Gould	Winder & Co. (LR), or J.Wheeler & Co. (RS)	Liverpool–Africa	LR & RS

Lloyd's Register gave Laurel's origins as Dutch, launched in 1786. The Register of Shipping described her as having been built in India, of teak, and having been launched in 1797. In later years it amended her listing to show her as a Dutch prize.

Captain Gould sailed to Africa. Lloyd's List reported in March 1803 that Laurel, Gould, master, had arrived in Africa from Liverpool. She returned to Liverpool from Africa on 10 August 1803. Her rapid and direct return suggests that this voyage did not involve enslaved people. (Note: The database on Trans-Atlantic Slave voyages report on Laurel, Gould, master, apparently conflates the Laurel of this voyage with Laurel.)

Year	Master	Owner	Trade	Source & notes
1804	T.Phillips	Captain & Co.	Liverpool–Africa	RS; new deck and large repair 1803

Captain Thomas Phillips acquired a letter of marque on 5 January 1804. He sailed from Liverpool on 13 February, in company with Kitty's Amelia and Urania. In 1804, 147 vessels sailed from English ports bound for Africa to acquire and transport enslaved people; 126 of these vessels sailed from Liverpool.

Laurel, Kitty's Amelia, and Urania were out only three days when they encountered a French warship. They were able to escape though Laurel had one man killed and two wounded, and Urania had two men wounded. She acquired captives at Angola, as did Urania, and they then sailed in company for Demerara.

Lloyd's List reported in January 1805 that Laurel, Phillips, master, and Urania, Melling, master, had encountered a French vessel while they were off Surinam. Phillips and his chief mate were killed and Urania had suffered so much damage it was feared that she would be condemned.

Laurel arrived at Demerara on 21 November 1804 with 206 captives. Captain Phillips died on 30 November. Captain Henry Corren replaced Phillips. Laurel sailed from Demerara on 26 January 1805 and arrived back at Liverpool on 13 April. She had left Liverpool with 30 crew members and had suffered five crew deaths on her voyage.

Year	Master	Owner	Trade	Source & notes
1805	T.Phillips; R.Hume	Wheeler & Co. M'Dowell & Co.	Liverpool–Africa	LR; new wales & large repair 1804

Captain Robert Hume acquired a letter of marque on 8 October 1805. He sailed for Africa on 22 October.

== Fate ==
Lloyd's List reported in April 1806 that a French squadron consisting of an 84-gun ship-of-the-line and three frigates had captured Lord Nelson, Trio, and the sloop-of-war HMS Favourite off the coast of Africa.

Lloyd's List reported that prior to 26 January L'Hermite's squadron of the French Navy captured off the coast of Africa Lord Nelson, Darnault, master, Laurel, Hume, master, Ponsonby, Brown, master, Juverna, Brassey, master, Wells, Hughes, master, and Active, of London, Wiley, master. The French put all the captured crews on Active and sent her back to England. The squadron burnt the other vessels that they had captured. The captains arrived at Waterford on 12 May.

The same squadron also captured Sarah, Otway, Mary, Adams, master, and Nelson, Meath, master.

In 1806, 33 British vessels in the triangular trade were lost; 23 of these loses occurred off the coast of Africa. During the period 1793 to 1807, war, rather than maritime hazards or resistance by the captives, was the greatest cause of vessel losses among British enslaving vessels.
