= Active (1805 ship) =

UK merchant ship (1805–1814)

History

United Kingdom
- Name: Active
- Launched: South America
- Acquired: circa 1805 by purchase of a prize
- Fate: Last listed 1814

General characteristics
- Tons burthen: 143, or 149 (bm)
- Complement: 25 (1807)
- Armament: 1806:2 × 4–pounder guns + 2 × 9–pounder carronades; 1807: 10 × 12&9-pounder cannons

Active was launched in South America and came into British hands in 1803 as a Spanish prize. She first appears in British online sources in 1805. She was on a voyage to Africa when a French squadron captured her in late 1805 or early 1806, and then released her. Although the registers carried her to 1814, she effectively disappears after her return to England.

== Career ==
Active first appeared in Lloyd's Register (LR) in the volume for 1805, and the Register of Shipping (RS), in 1806.

Year	Master	Owner	Trade	Source
1805	J.Willy	M'millan	London–Africa	LR
1806	J.Willy	M'millan	London–Africa	RS

Although Active's trade was London–Africa, she does not appear to have been a slave ship. She does not appear in the pre-eminent database on the Transatlantic Slave Trade.

On 2 November 1805, Active, Wiley, arrived at Madeira from Portsmouth. Lloyd's List reported in April 1806 that a French squadron consisting of an 84-gun ship-of-the-line and three frigates had captured Lord Nelson, Trio, and the sloop-of-war HMS Favourite off the coast of Africa.

Lloyd's List reported that prior to 26 January L'Hermite's squadron of the French Navy captured off the coast of Africa Lord Nelson, Darnault, master, Laurel, Hume, master, Ponsonby, Brown, master, Juverna, Brassey, master, Wells, Hughes, master, and Active, of London, Wiley, master. The French put all the captured crews on Active and sent her back to England. The squadron burnt the other vessels that they had captured. The captains arrived at Waterford on 12 May on the cartel Active.

Year	Master	Owner	Trade	Source
1806	J.Willy; Lamb	McMillan; Wilson	London–Africa	LR

Captain John Lamb acquired a letter of marque on 19 September 1807. However, Captain John Luck acquired one on 30 September.

The Register of Shipping carried Active until 1813, and Lloyd's Register carried her until 1814, both with data unchanged from 1806. It is not clear that these are meaningful. There is no mention of Active, Lamb, master, or Luck, master in Lloyd's List's ship arrival and departure data in 1806, or later.
