= Two Sisters (ship) =

Several vessels have been named Two Sisters:

- Two Sisters (1797 ship) was launched in 1797 in Nova Scotia and in 1804 shifted her registry to the United Kingdom. A French privateer captured her in 1804 but members of her crew were able to recapture her. She became a coaster and was last listed in 1813.
- Two Sisters (1799 ship) was possibly built in the United States, or taken in 1798 as a prize of unknown origin. She became a slave ship sailing out of Liverpool and made two complete voyages as slaver. She was condemned at Kingston in 1802 after she had delivered her slaves on her third slave voyage.
