= Lord Nelson (1798 ship) =

British slave ship 1798–1806

Great Britain
- Name: Lord Nelson
- Owner: 1799:James Bold & Robert Bibby; 1801: Graham Monkhouse, Thomas Hayes, & Samuel Newton
- Builder: Liverpool
- Launched: 1798
- Captured: January 1806

General characteristics
- Tons burthen: 237, 250, or 271 (bm)
- Complement: 1804:35; 1805:30
- Armament: 1799:22 × 6-pounder guns; 1804:20 × 6-pounder guns; 1805:20 × 6-pounder guns

Lord Nelson was launched in 1798 at Liverpool and subsequently made five voyages carrying enslaved people from West Africa to the West Indies in the triangular trade in enslaved people. On her first voyage she helped suppress a revolt on another vessel by that vessel's captives. This gave rise to an interesting case in salvage money. A French naval squadron captured Lord Nelson off Sierra Leone on her sixth voyage, before she had embarked any captives.

== Career ==
Lord Nelson appears in Lloyd's Register for 1799 with J.Kendall, master, J.Bold, owner, and trade Liverpool–Africa.

1st voyage transporting enslaved people (1799-1800): Reportedly, Captain Hugh Stephens sailed from Liverpool on 7 March 1799, bound for West Central Africa. In 1799, 156 vessels sailed from English ports, bound for the trade in enslaved people; 134 of these vessels sailed from Liverpool.

By May 1799 when Lord Nelson had reached Cabinda, John Kendall was master. While she was there, Trelawney arrived and started acquiring captives. In the morning of 2 August the 85 captives aboard Trelawney rose up against their captors. They wounded two sailors; the rest escaped in the boats and made their way to Lord Nelson, leaving the ship in the rebels's hands. Captain Kendall started firing on Lord Trelawney and sent his men to retake her. The men from Lord Nelson succeeded in subduing the uprising. Kendall then went aboard Trelawney, forcing her captain and crew to come with him. Kendall sued Trelawney's owners for salvage. The judge of the High Court of Admiralty awarded the plaintiff 10% of the estimated value of Trelawney, her cargo, and freight, approximately £10,000, plus the salvor's expenses. The award was less than would be awarded by application of the Prize Act, as the judge ruled that the two vessels had a duty of mutual assistance. (Note: A summary of acts of resistance by captives merely attributes the recapture to a nearby slave ship. As Trelawney was not lost, the incident does not appear in a list of vessels lost to insurrection by captives, conflicts with coastal Africans, and wrecks on the coast of Africa.)

Lord Nelson acquired her captives at the Congo River, Cabinda, and Ambriz. She arrived at Kingston, Jamaica, on 2 February 1800, with 360 captives. She left Jamaica on 2 April, and arrived back at Liverpool on 7 June. She had left with 49 crew members and had suffered six crew deaths on the voyage.

2nd voyage transporting enslaved people (1800-1801): Captain John Wilson sailed from Liverpool on 13 November 1800, bound for the Windward Coast. In 1800, 133 vessels sailed from English ports, bound for the trade in enslaved people; 120 of these vessels sailed from Liverpool.

Lord Nelson acquired captives at Grand Cape Mount and left Africa on 4 February 1801. She arrived at Demerara on 7 March with 255 captives. At some point Captain Armstrong replaced Wilson. She left Demerara 3 April and arrived at Liverpool on 1 June. She had left Liverpool with a crew of 41 men and she suffered one crew death on the voyage.

3rd voyage transporting enslaved people (1801-1802): Captain Francis Darnoult sailed from Liverpool on 3 September 1801. In 1801, 147 vessels sailed from English ports, bound for the trade in enslaved people; 122 of these vessels sailed from Liverpool.

Lord Nelson arrived at Trinidad on 23 February 1802 with 271 captives. She left Trinidad on 8 March and arrived back at Liverpool on 20 April. She had left Liverpool with 40 crew members and suffered six crew deaths on the voyage. (Note: Darnault had been first mate on Lord Nelson's previous voyage.)

4th voyage transporting enslaved people (1802-1803): Captain Isaac Westron sailed from Liverpool 31 August 1802. In 1802, 155 vessels sailed from English ports, bound for the trade in enslaved people; 122 of these vessels sailed from Liverpool.

Lord Nelson left Africa on 30 January 1803 and arrived at the Bahamas on 23 March with 250 captives. She arrived back at Liverpool on 1 September 1803. She had left Liverpool with 34 crew members and she suffered five crew deaths on the voyage.

5th voyage transporting enslaved people (1804-1805): Captain Thomas Omen acquired a letter of marque on 11 July 1804. He sailed from Liverpool on 15 August 1804 for the Windward Coast. In 1804, 147 vessels sailed from English ports, bound for the trade in enslaved people; 126 of these vessels sailed from Liverpool.

Lord Nelson acquired captives at Grand Cape Mount and arrived at Dutch Guiana on 10 January 1805, with 371 captives. She left Dutch Guiana on 19 April and arrived back at Liverpool on 11 June. She had left Liverpool with 45 crew members and she suffered 11 crew deaths on the voyage.

== Fate ==
Captain Francis Darnoult was again captain of Lord Nelson on what was to be her sixth voyage to transport enslaved people. He acquired a letter of marque on 29 October 1805. He and 38 crew members left Liverpool on 3 November 1805.

Lloyd's List reported on 8 April 1806 that a French squadron consisting of an 84-gun ship-of-the-line and three frigates had captured Lord Nelson, Trio, and the sloop-of-war HMS Favourite off the coast of Africa.

Lloyd's List reported that prior to 26 January L'Hermite's squadron of the French Navy captured off the coast of Africa Lord Nelson, Darnault, master, Laurel, Hume, master, Ponsonby, Brown, master, Juverna, Brassey, master, Wells, Hughes, master, and Active, of London, Wiley, master. The French put all the captured crews on Active and sent her back to England. The squadron burnt the other vessels that they had captured. The captains arrived at Waterford on 12 May on the cartel Active.

The same squadron also captured Sarah, Otway, Mary, Adams, master, and Nelson, Meath, master.

In 1804 and 1805, 30 British slave ships were lost. In 1804, eight were lost off the coast of Africa. In 1805, 13 were lost off the coast. War, rather than maritime hazards or slave resistance, was the greatest cause of vessel losses among British slave vessels.
