= Two Sisters =

Two Sisters or The Two Sisters may refer to:

== Film and television ==
- Two Sisters (1929 film), an American drama by Scott Pembroke, featuring Boris Karloff
- Two Sisters (1991 film), a Canadian animated short by Caroline Leaf
- Two Sisters (2019 film), a Malaysian Mandarin-language horror mystery
- The Two Sisters (film), a 1950 Italian drama directed by Mario Volpe
- The Two Sisters (TV series), a 2024 South Korean drama series

== Literature ==
- The Two Sisters (novel), a 1926 novel by H. E. Bates
- The Two Sisters (play), a play by Denman Thompson and George W. Ryer
- Two Sisters (novel), a 1970 novel by Gore Vidal
- Two Sisters (or 2 Sisters), a 2005 graphic novel by Matt Kindt
- Two Sisters, a 2010 play by Gail Louw

== Music ==
- "The Two Sisters" (folk song), a traditional murder ballad and folk song
- "Two Sisters" (Fiction Plane song), 2007
- "Two Sisters" (The Kinks song), 1967
- "Two Sisters", a song by Andrew Bird from Music of Hair, 1996

== Paintings ==
- Two Sisters (On the Terrace), by Pierre-Auguste Renoir, 1881
- The Two Sisters (Chassériau), by Théodore Chassériau, 1843
- The Two Sisters (Lemmen), by Georges Lemmen, 1894
- Two Sisters, by William-Adolphe Bouguereau, 1901
- The Two Sisters, by Jean-Honoré Fragonard, after 1778

== Places ==
- Two Sisters (Montana), a mountain peak in the US
- Two Sisters Lake, a lake in Newbold, Oneida County, Wisconsin, US
- The Two Sisters (British Columbia), a pair of mountains overlooking Vancouver in British Columbia, Canada

== Ships ==
- Two Sisters (1797 ship), a schooner launched in Nova Scotia, later UK-registered
- Two Sisters (1799 ship), a British slave ship
- USS Two Sisters, a schooner during the American Civil War

== Other uses ==
- 2 Sisters Food Group, a British food processing company
- Battle of Two Sisters, a 1982 engagement of the Falklands War, at Two Sisters Ridge

== See also ==
- A Tale of Two Sisters (disambiguation)
