= Laurel (ship) =

Several vessels have been named Laurel for the laurel.

- Laurel (1790 ship) was launched in 1790. She first appeared in online British sources in 1802. She made one voyage from Liverpool as a slave ship in the triangular trade in enslaved people. On her return to Liverpool she became a privateer, but was captured in June 1803 after having herself captured a French merchant vessel.
- Laurel (1802 ship). Her origins are ambiguous. She first appeared in online British sources in 1802. She made three voyages from Liverpool to Africa. On the first she apparently was on a trading voyage. The second was a complete voyage as a slave ship in the triangular trade in enslaved people. During this voyage she was involved in two sanguinary engagements with French vessels, the second of which resulted in the death of her master. She set out on a second slave trading voyage in 1805 but a French squadron captured and burnt her before she had embarked any slaves.
- Laurel (1850), was a 187-foot, iron hull paddle steamer built by Caird & Co, Greenock for service between Glasgow and Liverpool.
- Laurel (1863), launched in 1863, was a 207-foot, iron hull paddle steamer built by A. & J. Inglis Ltd., Glasgow. She made one successful blockade run as CSS vessel, owned by the CSA, renamed Confederate States and survived the war. In 1865 she was renamed Walter Stanhope. In 1882 she became Niobe, in 1887 Bordelais, and in 1888 Niobe again. On 28 November 1905 she sank in Le Havre roads after a collision with SS Gregory.
- Laurel (1873), later name of the paddle steamer Thomas Dugdale

== See also ==
- HMS Laurel, any one of 10 vessels of the Royal Navy
- USS Laurel (1862), a tug that served the US Army and Navy during the American Civil War
- USS Laurel (1915), a US Lighthouse Service tender, temporarily transferred to the Navy during World War I
- USCGC Laurel (WLB-291), a US Coast Guard buoy tender, built in 1942
