= Otway (1800 ship) =

History

Great Britain
- Name: Otway
- Owner: 1800:Thompson; 1803:Kitchen & Co.
- Acquired: 1800 by purchase of a prize
- Fate: Captured 1806

France
- Name: Alert or Alerte
- Acquired: 1806 by purchase of a prize
- Captured: 14 October 1807

General characteristics
- Tons burthen: 374 (bm)
- Propulsion: Sail
- Complement: 1800:30; 1801:25; 1805:40; 1807:150 (at capture)
- Armament: 1800:16 × 6&9&18-pounder guns; 1800:16 × 6&9&18-pounder guns; 1801:16 × 6&9&18-pounder guns; 1801:14 × 6-pounder guns + 2 ×18-pounder carronades; 1805:20 × 6&9-pounder guns; 1806:4 × 12 + 14 × 6-pounder guns + 2 × 18-pounder carronades; 1807:22 × 8-pounder guns (at capture)

Otway was a French or Spanish vessel built in 1799 that became a Liverpool-based slave ship in 1800. She made four voyages in the triangular trade in enslaved people, delivering captives from West Africa to the West Indies before the French Navy captured her in 1806. She became the Guadeloupe-based privateer Alerte (or Alert) and captured a number of British merchantmen before the Royal Navy captured her i October 1807.

== Ambiguous origins ==
Lloyd's Register gives inconsistent information on Otway's origins. Lloyd's Register lists her as of French origin, and launched in 1799. The Register of Shipping describes her as a Spanish prize, and gives her year as 1800. This was the year in which she was registered at Liverpool.

== Career ==
Captain John Herron acquired a letter of marque on 11 November 1800. He sailed from Liverpool on 4 December 1800. He gathered captives at "West Central Africa and St. Helena", and 10 May 1801 delivered them to Kingston, Jamaica. Six crewmen, of 37, died on the voyage. Herron embarked 372 captives, and disembarked 336, for a mortality rate of 9.7%. Otway sailed from Kingston on 7 June, and arrived back at Liverpool on 5 July.

Otway entered Lloyd's Register in the 1801 volume with J. Herron, master, changing to L. Mann, and owner Thompson. Her trade was Liverpool—Africa.

Captain Luke Mann acquired a letter of marque on 19 August 1801. He sailed for Africa from Liverpool on 27 August. Lloyd's List reported on 4 September that Otway, Mann, master, was on shore at Bootle Bay, Liverpool, while on her way to Africa. Mann acquired captives in the Bight of Biafra (Bight of Bonny) and Gulf of Guinea islands. Otway delivered her captives at Kingston on 21 March 1802. Three crew members of 41 died on the voyage. She disembarked 321 captives. Otway sailed from Jamaica on 29 April and arrived at Liverpool on 12 June.

Captain Mann made a second voyage in 1802. Otway sailed from Liverpool on 11 October, and arrived at Kingston on 16 May 1803. She had one crew member die on the voyage. She disembarked 302 captives. On 11 June the Royal Gazette advertised: "For Sale 302 Choice Young Ebo NEGROES imported in the ship Otway, Luke Mann, master." Leigh Lyon replaced Mann as Otway's master. Otway left Jamaica on 21 July, and arrived back at Liverpool on 19 October.

Lloyd's Register for 1804 showed Otway's master changing from L. Mann to D. Stewart, and her owner from Thompson to Kitchen & Co. It is not clear what, if anything, Otway did in 1804. Captain Duncan Steward (or Stewart) acquired a letter of marque on 7 February 1805.

Stewart sailed from Liverpool on 8 November 1804, bound from West Central Africa and St Helena. He acquired captives from the Congo River area and arrived at Kingston on 10 April 1805 with 332 captives. Three men of the 48-man crew died on the voyage. Otway sailed from Jamaica on 4 July, and arrived at Liverpool on 24 August.

Captain Alexander Hackney acquired a letter of marque on 10 September 1805. He sailed from Liverpool on 1 October 1805, bound for Africa.

== Capture ==
In 1806 the French frigate Cybèle was part of a squadron under Commodore Jean-Marthe-Adrien L'Hermite, along with the 74-gun Régulus, the frigate Président and the brig-corvette Surveillant. During L'Hermite's expedition, she took part in the capture of the brig HMS Favourite and of about 20 merchantmen, notably Otway and Plowers (Plover).

On 6 June 1806 Lloyd's List reported that Otway was "all well" off the "Logus Coast" of Africa. Four days later Lloyd's List reported that the French had captured Otway. The French captured Otway before she had embarked any captives. The same squadron also captured Sarah, Lord Nelson, Mary, Adams, master, and Nelson, Meath, master.

During the period 1793 to 1807, war, rather than maritime hazards or resistance by the captives, was the greatest cause of vessel losses among British vessels transporting enslaved people.

The Register of Shipping for 1806 still carried Steward as Otway's master, but had the notation "captured" by her name. Lloyd's Register had Stewart as master, but has no notation as to capture.

The French Navy may have considered taking Otway into service. Sources on the French Navy states that she was possibly commissioned as a corvette in the Navy, but if so it was brief. She was not on the Navy lists in 1807.

== French privateer ==
In early 1807 the French privateer Alert, of 20 guns captured Alexander, Pince, master, and Ann, Strahan, master, both of Liverpool, and took them into Guadeloupe. Alert also captured Harriet, Thompson, master, of Lancaster, but HMS Mosambique recaptured Harriet. In the engagement with Alerte at 26°15′N 58°10′W Alexander suffered four men killed and Captain Pince and four men wounded before Alexander struck. After she captured Alexander, Alerte captured Harriet. Alerte was the former Otway.

On 14 March Alerte, Captain Moreau, "late the Ostroy, of Liverpool, Guineaman", of twenty-two 8-pounders and 150 men, captured Highlander, of Glasgow, from Demerara to Liverpool. Highlander arrived at Guadeloupe on the 30th. On the 16th Clio and Ajax, which had been in company with Highlander, were seen sailing to Guadeloupe in company with Alerte. Alerte accompanied them until she saw them safe at anchor and then set out to sea again. She next captured two British letters of marque, probably Jason and Maxwell, of Liverpool. Alerte took them into Guadeloupe too. (Note: Lieutenant George Augustus Westphal was a passenger on Highlander, being invalided home from service on HMS Demerara. On the way he trained Highlander's crew in gunnery. When Alerte approached, he commanded Highlander's crew in her resistance to the privateer. Highlander was able to repel three attempts to board but had to strike after a fourth attempt succeeded. Highlander had suffered five men killed and seven wounded, including Westphal and her mate.)

HMS Blonde captured "that dangerous Privateer the Alert, who has done so much Injury to the Trade". Alerte, of twenty 9&6-pounder guns, was off Suriname at 10°00′N 57°30′W on 14 October 1807 when Blonde gave chase. After an all-day chase and a few well-directed shots, Alert struck. She was last from Cayenne and had taken nothing. (Note: French sources simply describe Alerte as: "privateer, possibly from Bordeaux, commissioned April 1807 with 140 men and 20 guns".)
