= Highlander (1805 ship) =

History

United Kingdom
- Name: Highlander
- Builder: Sunderland, or Scotland
- Launched: 1805, or 1806
- Captured: March 1807
- Fate: Wrecked 1809

General characteristics
- Tons burthen: 341, or 347 (bm)
- Complement: 30–35
- Armament: 10 × 6-pounder guns + 4 × 12-pounder carronades

Highlander was launched at Sunderland in 1805 as a West Indiaman, trading with Demerara. She was captured in 1807 after a sanguinary single ship action. One of her passengers was a naval officer repatriating for illness, but who escaped French custody and later rose to be a Rear Admiral. She returned to British ownership and was wrecked in 1809.

== Career ==
She first appeared in Lloyd's Register (LR) in 1806.

Year	Master	Owner	Trade	Source
1806	Stevenson	M'Inroy	Greenock–Demerara	LR
1807	Stevenson	M'Naught	Liverpool–Demerara	LR

On 14 March 1807 while returning to England from Demerara, Highlander encountered the French privateer Alerte, Captain Moreau, of twenty-two 8-pounder guns and 150 men, which captured her. Highlander arrived at Guadeloupe on 30 March.

Lieutenant George Augustus Westphal was a passenger on Highlander, being invalided home from service on HMS Demerara. On the way he trained Highlander's crew in gunnery. When Alerte approached, he commanded Highlander's crew in her resistance to the privateer. Highlander was able to repel three attempts to board but had to strike after a fourth attempt succeeded. Highlander had suffered five men killed and seven wounded, including Westphal and her mate. Alerte sent Highlander into Guadeloupe. (Note: Westphal escaped and rejoined the Royal Navy. He rose to be knighted and become an admiral.)

LR for 1808 carried the annotation "capt" beneath her name. The issue for 1809 had the same annotation, but also showed a change of owner, master, and trade, suggesting that somehow she had come back into British ownership.

Year	Master	Owner	Trade	Source
1809	Stevenson; Cooper	M'Naught; Stewart & Co.	Liverpool–Demerara; Greenock–New Brunswick	LR
1809	J.Cooper	Stewart & Co.	Greenock–New Brunswick	LR
1810	J.Cooper	R.Stuart	Liverpool–America	RS

== Fate ==
Highlander, Cooper, master, from the Clyde, was lost at New Brunswick. The Register of Shipping (RS) for 1810 carried the annotation "LOST" by her name.
