= HMS Bermuda =

Seven commissioned ships of the British Royal Navy have been named Bermuda and given the prefix HMS (Her Majesty's Ship or His Majesty's Ship, depending on the sex of the monarch), after the British Overseas Territory and former Imperial fortress of Bermuda. Two other vessels operated by the Royal Navy that were not commissioned warships were also named Bermuda.

- HMS Bermuda (1795) was a 14-gun brig-sloop purchased in 1795 that disappeared in September 1796 in the Gulf of Florida.
- HMS Bermuda (1805) was an 18-gun sloop-of-war launched in 1805 and wrecked 22 April 1808 with no loss of life.
- HMS Bermuda (1808) was a 10-gun brig-sloop built by John Pelham of Frindsbury and launched 1808; she was wrecked 16 November 1816, with the loss of one life.
- HMS Bermuda (1813) was a pilot boat acquired in 1813 and broken up 1817.
- HMS Bermuda (1819) was a schooner purchased 1819 and foundered in March 1821 near Bermuda with the loss of her entire crew.
- HMS Bermuda (1848) was a 3-gun schooner launched 1848 and wrecked 20 January 1855, with no loss of life.
- HMS Bermuda (C52) was a cruiser launched 1941 and broken up 1965.

== Other ships of the Royal Navy named Bermuda ==
- Auxiliary Small Craft Bermuda, was a 211 GRT trawler built in 1905 and registered in Grimsby as GY.56. Hired for naval use as a minesweeper and armed with one 6-pounder gun. Admiralty pennant number 712. In service from 16 November 1914, to 14 December 1920.
- AFD Bermuda was an Admiralty Floating Dock, towed to the Bermuda Dockyard in 1869 by HMS Warrior, HMS Black Prince and HMS Terrible.

== See also ==
- History of the Royal Navy in Bermuda
