= French ship Régulus (1805) =

Ship of the line of the French Navy

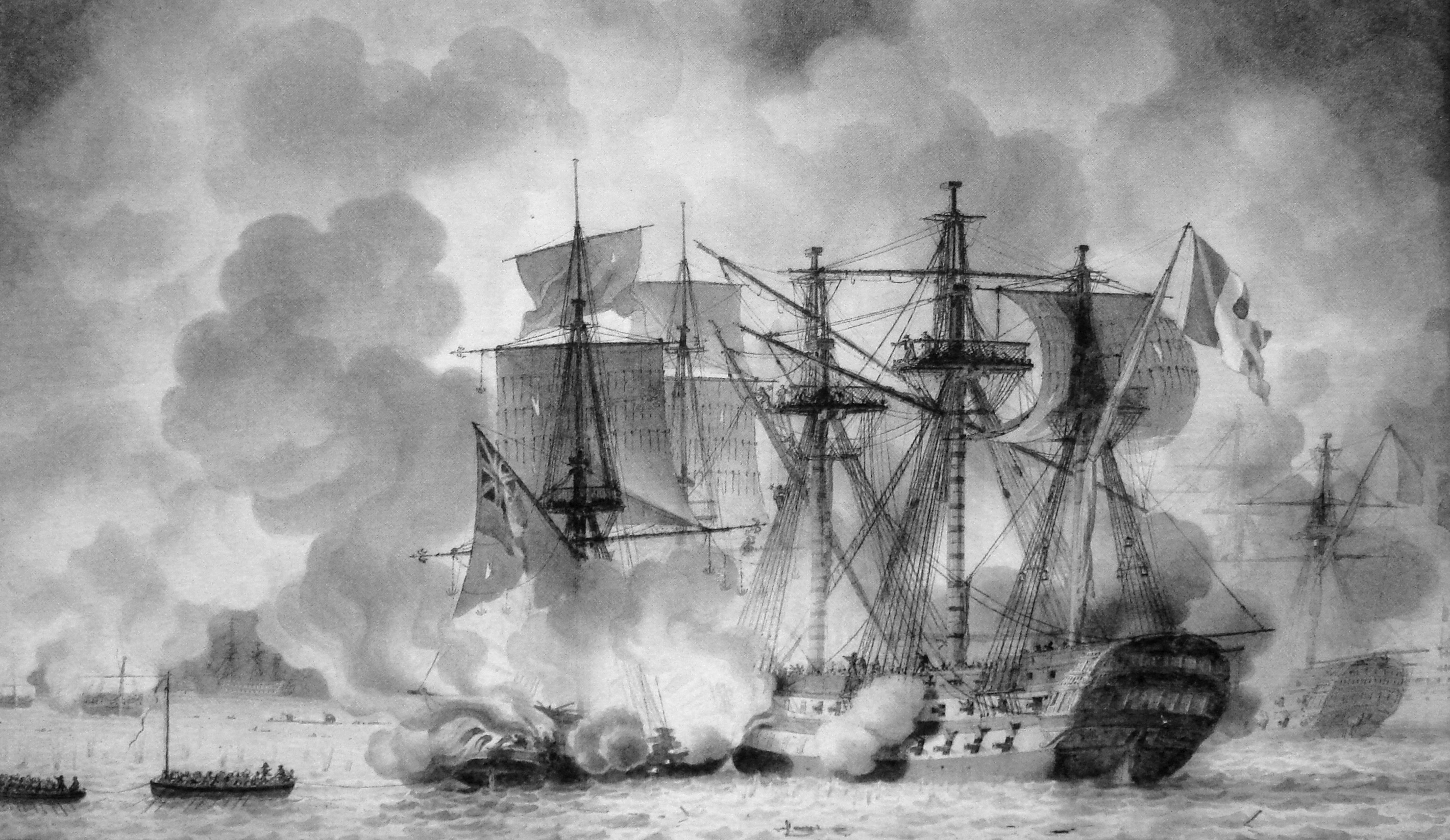
- The French Régulus under attack by British fireships, during the evening of 11 August 1809. Drawing by Louis-Philippe Crépin.

History

France
- Name: Régulus
- Namesake: Regulus
- Ordered: 4 April 1801
- Builder: Lorient
- Laid down: 2 November 1801
- Launched: 12 April 1805
- Completed: July 1805
- Commissioned: 15 April 1805
- Fate: Burned and scuttled 7 April 1814

General characteristics
- Class & type: Téméraire-class ship of the line
- Displacement: 3,069 tonneaux
- Tons burthen: 1,537 port tonneaux
- Length: 55.87 m (183 ft 4 in)
- Beam: 14.46 m (47 ft 5 in)
- Draught: 7.15 m (23.5 ft)
- Depth of hold: 7.15 m (23 ft 5 in)
- Sail plan: Full-rigged ship
- Crew: 705
- Armament: 74 guns: Lower gun deck: 28 × 36 pdr guns; Upper gun deck: 30 × 18 pdr guns; Forecastle and Quarterdeck: 16 × 8 pdr guns

Régulus was a 74-gun Téméraire-class ship of the line built for the French Navy during the 1790s. Completed in 1805, she played a minor role in the Napoleonic Wars.

== Description ==
Designed by Jacques-Noël Sané, the Téméraire-class ships had a length of 55.87 metres (183 ft 4 in), a beam of 14.46 metres (47 ft 5 in) and a depth of hold of 7.15 metres (23 ft 5 in). The ships displaced 3,069 tonneaux and had a mean draught of 7.15 metres (23 ft 5 in). They had a tonnage of 1,537 port tonneaux. Their crew numbered 705 officers and ratings during wartime. They were fitted with three masts and ship rigged.

The muzzle-loading, smoothbore armament of the Téméraire class consisted of twenty-eight 36-pounder long guns on the lower gun deck and thirty 18-pounder long guns on the upper gun deck. On the quarterdeck and forecastle were a total of sixteen 8-pounder long guns. Beginning with the ships completed after 1787, the armament of the Téméraires began to change with the addition of four 36-pounder obusiers on the poop deck (dunette). Some ships had instead twenty 8-pounders.

== Construction and career ==
Régulus was ordered on 5 April 1802 and named on 7 January 1803. The ship was laid down in July at the Arsenal de Lorient and launched on 12 April 1804. The ship was commissioned on 15 April 1805 and completed in July. During the Atlantic campaign of 1806, she was the flagship of L'Hermite's squadron (also comprising frigates Président and Cybèle and corvette Surveillant) during L'Hermite's expedition. She patrolled from the Gulf of Guinea to Brazil and the Caribbean. On 6 January 1806 the French squadron captured the 16-gun sloop-of-war HMS Favourite. The squadron also captured about 20 merchantman, notably including the ships Otway and Plowers (Plover).

In 1809, Régulus was transferred to Rochefort. She famously took part in the Battle of the Basque Roads from 11 April 1809, under Captain Jean Jacques Étienne Lucas, where she ran aground between Les Palles and Fouras. For 17 days, the stranded ship defended itself from four British attacks, before refloating and returning to Rochefort. Régulus was scuttled by fire on 7 April 1814 near Meschers-sur-Gironde to avoid capture by the British vessels HMS Egmont and HMS Centaur.
