= L'Hermite's expedition =

1805 French naval expedition during the Napoleonic Wars

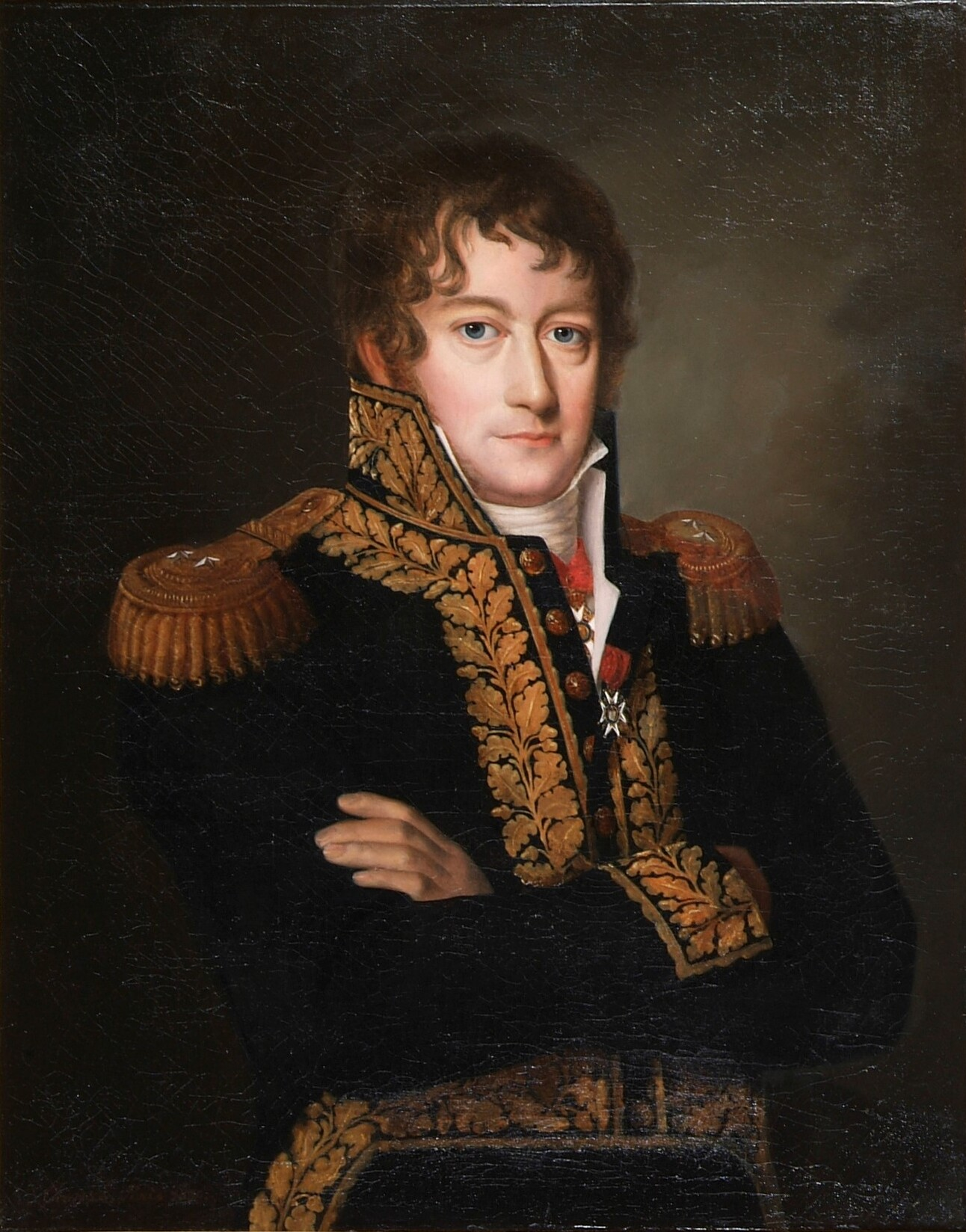
Jean-Marthe-Adrien l'Hermite, the leader of the expedition

L'Hermite's expedition was a French naval operation launched in 1805 during the Napoleonic Wars. The operation was intended as both a commerce raiding operation against the British trading posts of West Africa and as a diversion to the Trafalgar campaign. Sailing from Lorient in October 1805 with one ship of the line, two frigates and a corvette, Commodore Jean-Marthe-Adrien l'Hermite was under orders to intercept and destroy British merchant vessels and slave ships off the West African coast and await reinforcements under Jérôme Bonaparte which were to be used in the invasion and capture of one of the British trading forts for use as a permanent French naval base from which further raiding operations could be conducted. It was also hoped by the French naval command that l'Hermite might draw some of the large British fleet maintained off Cádiz away from the blockade to allow the French and Spanish allied fleet trapped in the harbour to escape.

Although l'Hermite achieved minor successes against individual British shipping, his force was too small to have a serious impact on British trade in the region and the promised reinforcements failed to materialise in the aftermath of the destruction of the Cádiz fleet at the Battle of Trafalgar on 21 October 1805, ten days before l'Hermite sailed although before news of the battle had reached Lorient. In early January 1806, l'Hermite managed to capture a small British naval brig but was still unable to make any significant impact on British trade operations. In the spring of 1806 l'Hermite withdrew across the Atlantic, taking on supplies and effecting repairs in neutral Brazil. During the return journey to France in August 1806, the squadron was caught in a major hurricane and one frigate was severely damaged, limping to a port in the United States for repairs. The rest of the squadron continued on to France, l'Hermite reaching Brest in his flagship Régulus. The other frigate was intercepted by a British blockade squadron on 27 September 1806 and captured in the Bay of Biscay.

== Background ==
By the summer of 1806, the Napoleonic Wars were two years old and the first major campaign at sea, the Trafalgar campaign, was nearing its climax. A French fleet had departed Toulon in March 1805 under Vice-Admiral Pierre-Charles Villeneuve, gathered Spanish ships from the Spanish Mediterranean ports and then crossed the Atlantic, under orders to disrupt British trade in the region and seize British colonies. Closely pursuing the Allied fleet was an equivalent British Royal Navy force under Vice-Admiral Lord Nelson, which reached the Caribbean on 11 June and found that Villeneuve had already begun the return journey to Europe. On 22 July 1805 the Allied fleet had fought the Battle of Cape Finisterre against a British force under Sir Robert Calder and been forced to divert south, seeking shelter in the Spanish fleet anchorage of Cádiz. Appearing off Cádiz a few days after Villeneuve's arrival, Nelson began a blockade of the Allied fleet, awaiting their emergence and preparing for battle.

Although the French Atlantic Fleet, principally based at the major seaport of Brest, had played no significant part in the campaign, it was decided that in order to relieve some of the pressure on the fleet in Cádiz, minor squadrons would be sent to prey on British trade in the Atlantic, hopefully drawing off some of Nelson's ships in pursuit. One such squadron was a force under Contre-Admiral Zacharie Allemand, consisting of five ships of the line, two frigates and two corvettes, which sailed from Brest for operations in the North Atlantic on 12 July. A second squadron was placed under Commodore Jean-Marthe-Adrien l'Hermite, with the ship of the line Régulus, frigates Président and Cybèle and corvette Surveillant. L'Hermite was ordered to sail to West Africa, attacking merchant vessels and slave ships that operated among the numerous British trading posts along the coastline. At an undetermined point in the cruise, l'Hermite would be joined by a larger squadron under Captain Jérôme Bonaparte, Emperor Napoleon Bonaparte's brother. The reinforced squadron would include over 1,000 French soldiers who would be used in an attack on one of the British West African trading posts. If the post could be successfully captured, it could be turned into a naval base for use by French commerce raiders and would force the British to deploy a full squadron from the Channel Fleet in response, at a time when every ship of the line was needed for the Trafalgar campaign.

== Expedition ==
L'Hermite's squadron sailed from Lorient on 31 October, avoiding contact with the British squadron blockading the port and heading for the West African coast. Although the news had not yet reached Brittany, Villeneuve's fleet had already been annihilated at the Battle of Trafalgar ten days earlier and L'Hermite's role as a diversion to the main campaign was no longer required. Cruising in the Gulf of Guinea during November and December, l'Hermite succeeded in capturing and burning a number of British merchantmen and slave ships. However, the intended reinforcements for l'Hermite squadron never appeared, as after Trafalgar Napoleon diverted naval resources to the Atlantic campaign of 1806, a major raiding operation to the Caribbean and South Atlantic launched in December 1805. Among the vessels assigned to this operation was Jérôme Bonaparte's ship Vétéran, which cruised as part of the squadron under Vice-Admiral Jean-Baptiste Phillibert Willaumez.

Without reinforcements, l'Hermite was unable to make any significant impact on Britain's trade off West Africa or make any attempt to capture a British trading post. On 6 January, he achieved a minor success when his ships captured the 16-gun British sloop-of-war Favourite under Commander John Davie. The prize was fitted out as part of the squadron and Surveillant was sent back to France with despatches. He also captured two British slave ships off the Sierra Leonean coast, Trio and Lord Nelson, neither of which had taken aboard any slaves. L'Hermite put Favourite's crew aboard Trio and sent her back to England as a cartel. He subsequently captured several more British slavers: Ponsonby, Juverna, Wells, Active and Laurel, and the French burnt all five ships, with their captains arriving at Waterford on 12 May on the cartel Active. L'Hermite's squadron also captured the slave ships Sarah, Otway (which the French navy may have briefly taken into service), Mary and Nelson.

In the spring of 1806, with his supplies running low, l'Hermite left the African coast and crossed the Atlantic, making his way to the Portuguese colony of Brazil. After several months refitting and taking on stores there, l'Hermite's squadron crossed the Caribbean Sea in July 1806, unknowingly passing through the same area that Willaumez was operating in but encountering only a handful of small merchant ships before entering the Atlantic in early August. He left Favourite behind in the West Indies, and on 27 January 1807 the British frigate HMS Jason recaptured her off Surinam. On 20 August, l'Hermite was caught in a hurricane at 22°26′N 55°00′W, the same storm that had dispersed and badly damaged Willaumez's squadron two days earlier. The damage was severe, with Cybèle suffering the most with the loss of her topmasts, rendering her slower than the rest of the squadron. Concerned by the frigate's weakness, l'Hermite ordered her to separate and sail for a harbour in the neutral United States, arriving at Hampton Roads on 1 September. Cybèle was later repaired and returned to France in 1807, joining the squadron based at Rochefort.

== Capture of Président ==
L'Hermite's three other ships all survived the hurricane relatively intact and were able to continue their journey to Europe unimpeded, the British squadrons in the area also dispersed by the summer storms. In late September the squadron broke up, Régulus sailing for Brest and arriving on 5 October, the only French ship of the line to enter or leave the port all year. Président was less successful: at 03:30 on 27 September, while sailing in the Bay of Biscay at 47°17′N 06°52′W, Captain Labrosse sighted six ships of the line. This overwhelming force was a squadron under Rear-Admiral Sir Thomas Louis, which had been sent to the Bay of Biscay to await the return of Willaumez from the Caribbean. Immediately giving chase, Louis found that his ships of the line were not fast enough to catch the French frigate, which began to outdistance the main body of the squadron. However one of the small 18-gun sloops attached to the squadron, HMS Despatch under Captain Edward Hawkins was able to keep pace with the frigate, coming within firing range at 18:45.

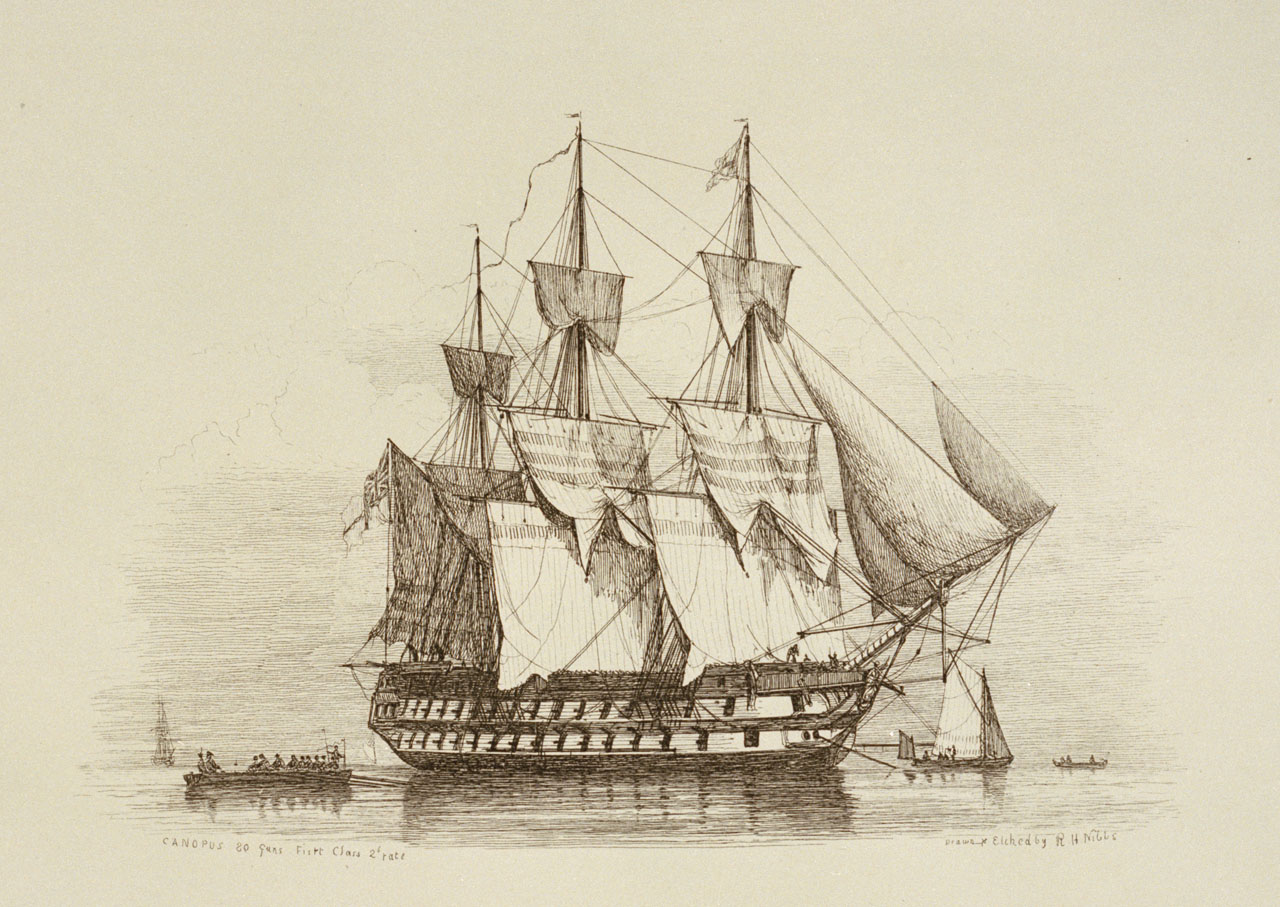
HMS Canopus, which captured Président

Although Hawkins only had two small guns that would bear on the frigate he kept up a steady rate of fire during the next hour, avoiding fire from the frigate's bow guns during the chase. By 19:45 it was obvious that Despatch's fire was successfully delaying the frigate and Labrosse turned towards the approaching squadron, moving as if to attack the nearest British frigate HMS Blanche under Sir Thomas Lavie. Seeing the French ship change direction, Louis ordered his flagship HMS Canopus to fire a gun at extreme range. This alerted Labrosse to the rapidly approaching squadron and he decided to surrender rather than be destroyed by the combined firepower of the British ships. No man had been hurt in the exchange of fire but Despatch had suffered severe damage to her rigging and one shot through her hull. The French ship had suffered minor damage in the engagement and was subsequently taken into the Royal Navy as HMS Presidente, renamed in 1815 to HMS Piemontaise. The frigate was much admired in the Royal Navy and a number of later frigates were built to a similar design.

== Order of battle ==
Commodore L'Hermite's squadron
Ship	Guns	Commander	Notes
Régulus	74	Commodore Jean-Marthe-Adrien L'Hermite	Returned to Brest on 5 October.
Président	40	Captain Labrosse	Captured by a British squadron in the Bay of Biscay on 27 September 1806.
Cybèle	40		Damaged in a hurricane on 20 August, forced to shelter in Hampton Roads. Returned to Rochefort in 1807.
Surveillant	corvette		Returned to France in January 1806.
Favourite	18		Captured off West Africa on 6 January and attached to squadron. Remained in the Caribbean and was captured by HMS Jason on 27 January 1807.
Source: James, p. 264

== Bibliography ==
- Clowes, William Laird (1997) [1900]. The Royal Navy, A History from the Earliest Times to 1900, Volume V. Chatham Publishing. ISBN 1-86176-014-0.
- Gardiner, Robert, ed. (2001) [1998]. The Campaign of Trafalgar. Caxton Editions. ISBN 1-84067-358-3.
- Gardiner, Robert, ed. (2001) [1998]. The Victory of Seapower. Caxton Editions. ISBN 1-84067-359-1.
- James, William (2002) [1827]. The Naval History of Great Britain, Volume 4, 1805–1807. Conway Maritime Press. ISBN 0-85177-908-5.
