= Urania (1800 ship) =

British save ship (1800–1802)

History

Great Britain
- Name: Urania
- Namesake: Urania
- Launched: 1795, Spain
- Acquired: 1800
- Fate: Condemned 1804

General characteristics
- Tons burthen: 155 (bm)
- Armament: 12 × 4-pounder guns

Urania was launched in 1795 in Spain and taken in prize. Starting in 1800 she made three voyages from Liverpool as a slave ship in the triangular trade in enslaved people. During the third voyage she was involved in two engagements with French vessels. She was so damaged in the second of these engagements that she was condemned in 1804 after she landed her captives at Demerara.

== Career ==
Urania does not appear to have ever received a letter of marque.

1st voyage transporting enslaved people (1800–1801): Captain David Williams sailed from Liverpool on 30 December 1800. In 1800, 133 vessels sailed from English port, bound for Africa to acquire and transport enslaved people; 120 of these vessels sailed from Liverpool.

Urania acquired captives at New Calabar and arrived at St Vincent on 29 July 1801. Urania sailed for Liverpool on 6 September and arrived there on 29 October. She had left Liverpool with 24 crew members and suffered one crew death on her voyage.

2nd voyage transporting enslaved people (1802): Captain John Preston sailed from Liverpool on 12 February 1802. In 1802, 155 vessels sailed from English port, bound for Africa to acquire and transport enslaved people; 122 of these vessels sailed from Liverpool.

Urania arrived at the Bahamas on 20 July with 189 captives. She left on 11 September and arrived back at Liverpool on 20 October. She had left Liverpool with 18 crew members and had suffered two crew deaths on her voyage.

Urania did not appear in Lloyd's Register (LR) until 1804.

Year	Master	Owner	Trade	Source
1804	C.M.Lyon	Winder & Co.	Liverpool–Africa	LR

3rd voyage transporting enslaved people (1804): Urania sailed from Liverpool on 13 February 1804. It is not clear who her master was. A key source gives the name of her master as John Ramsey. However, the accounts of her encounter with a French warship gives it as Lyon. She sailed from Liverpool on 13 February, in company with Kitty's Amelia and Laurel. In 1804, 147 vessels sailed from English port, bound for Africa to acquire and transport enslaved people; 126 of these vessels sailed from Liverpool.

Urania, Laurel, and Kitty's Amelia were out only three days when they encountered a French warship. They were able to escape though Laurel had one man killed and two wounded, and Urania had two men wounded. She acquired captives at Angola, more specifically at Loango and Malembo.

At some point Thomas Mellor replaced C.M.Lyon or John Ramsey as master.

Lloyd's List reported in January 1805 that Laurel, Phillips, master, and Urania, Melling, master, had encountered a French vessel while they were off Suriname on their way to Demerara. Phillips and his chief mate were killed, and Urania had suffered so much damage it was feared that she would be condemned.

Urania arrived at Demerara on 19 November 1804 with 187 captives and sold them there. The Essequebo and Demerary Gazette of 24 November 1804 reported that "on Wednesday the 28th Instant, at the Store of Robert Younghusband Esqr. A small Cargo of Healthy Young Angola Slaves; Imported in the Ship Urania, Capt. Mellor."

Urania had left Liverpool with 25 crew members and had suffered two crew deaths on her voyage.

== Fate ==
Urania was condemned at Demerara.

In 1804, 30 British vessels in the triangular trade were lost; 11 were lost in the Middle Passage, i.e., in the leg delivering captives to the west Indies. During the period 1793 to 1807, war, rather than maritime hazards or resistance by the captives, was the greatest cause of vessel losses among British vessels transporting enslaved people.
