= Robert Johnson (1745–1833) =

Irish barrister, politician, and judge (1745–1833)

Robert (Bob) Johnson (1745–1833) was an Irish barrister, politician and judge. He sat in the Irish House of Commons and was a judge of the Court of Common Pleas (Ireland).

In 1803 he published a number of attacks on various members of the Irish Government in the form of a series of letters written under the pseudonym "Juverna". The letters caused a major scandal, and after some delay, Johnson was identified as the author. He was prosecuted after a further delay and convicted of seditious libel. He was spared a prison sentence but forced to resign from the Bench, and retired into private life, where he continued his feud with the Dublin administration.

His motives for writing the Juverna letters are unclear, although he had made a similar anonymous attack on a senior Irish judge, Christopher Robinson, in 1779.

== Biography ==
He was born in Dublin, eldest son of Thomas Johnson, an apothecary who practised on Fishamble Street, and who was described as a "decent, orderly apothecary and a good, orthodox, hard-praying Protestant". Thomas was rather self-conscious about his humble origins, which may be why, when he was almost 60, he qualified as a physician. William Johnson (1760-1845), also an MP and a High Court judge, was Robert's youngest brother. He was regarded as by far the abler lawyer of the two, but his career was hampered by Robert's disgrace.

Robert married Susan Evans, daughter of John Evans of Dublin in 1778 (William married her sister). They had one daughter Margaret, who married her cousin William Johnson Alloway of Ballyshaneduff, County Laois, and had at least six children.

== Career ==
He entered Middle Temple in 1774 and was called to the Bar in 1776. He took silk in 1791, and was appointed counsel to the Revenue Board.

His political patron in the 1790s was Arthur Hill, 2nd Marquess of Downshire. The leading statesman Henry Grattan, who knew the Johnson family well, noted cynically that Johnson's father attributed Bob's success to the goodness of Providence, whereas everyone else attributed it to the goodness of the Marquess of Downshire. Others thought his rise to be due to his notorious servility to those in power.

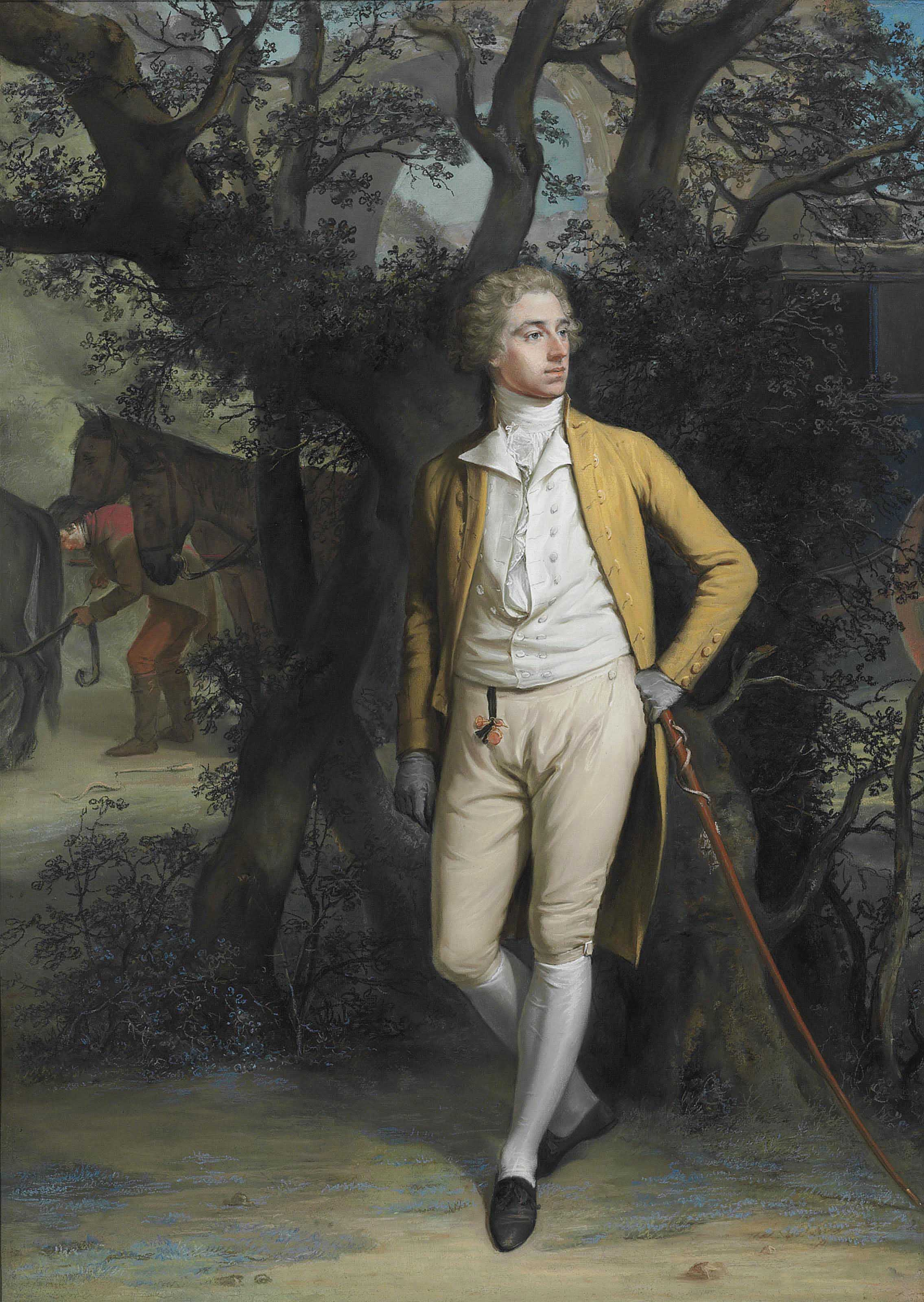
Arthur Hill, 2nd Marquess of Downshire

He held office as Recorder of Hillsborough. He was also Barracks Master for Dublin, an office requiring no professional qualifications, which made him something of an object of ridicule, as it was widely considered demeaning for a barrister to hold it. Due to Downshire's patronage he was also elected MP for Hillsborough. He was opposed to Catholic Emancipation, and in the aftermath of the Irish Rebellion of 1798 he criticised the authorities for excessive leniency to the rebels. He supported the Act of Union 1800, and thereby lost the patronage of Lord Downshire, who was one of the strongest opponents of the Union, and damaged his career in the process. Downshire committed suicide in 1801: according to his family, this was a result of his loss of political influence.

Johnson served briefly in the last session of the pre-Union Irish Parliament as member for Philipstown, and was made a judge of the Common Pleas in 1801, shortly after the Union took effect. He was not highly regarded as a lawyer ("deficient in knowledge" was the general view), and his promotion, which was very badly received by the legal profession, was universally seen as his reward for supporting the Act of Union. He received compensation for the loss of his previous offices of Revenue counsel, and the somewhat embarrassing role of Barracks Master.

He had a townhouse in Dublin city centre and a house at Milltown in south County Dublin; he also had a country residence at the Derries, or Ballyshaneduff, near Ballybrittas, County Laois, which was built by his son-in-law. After his disgrace he lived for a time in Paris. He was a member of the popular drinking club, The Monks of the Screw (or Order of Saint Patrick), which had been founded about 1780 by John Philpot Curran.

== The Juverna affair ==
In 1803 the radical English journalist William Cobbett published a series of letters in his weekly newspaper The Political Register, written by an author calling himself "Juverna". The name Juverna (or "Iverna") is a variant of "Hibernia", and was used by certain Irish nationalists as a poetic symbol for Ireland. The "Juverna" letters attacked the Irish executive with great venom, and were sympathetic to the recently executed Robert Emmet. They were extremely well-informed about the Irish judiciary, suggesting that the author was himself a judge. Suspicion fell at first on Johnson's colleague on the Court of Common Pleas, Luke Fox, who was noted for his bad temper and violent outbursts in Court. However in a personal interview with William Downes, 1st Baron Downes, the Lord Chief Justice of Ireland, Fox was able to convince Downes of his innocence.

Further inquiries proved Johnson to be the author: he may have fallen under suspicion because many years earlier he had published a similar attack on a long-serving High Court judge, Christopher Robinson, under another pseudonym, "Causidicus". Johnson was highly intelligent and well-read, and could be an agreeable enough companion, but he had few friends or admirers: Daniel O'Connell probably spoke for many when he described him as "dishonest". His appointment to the Bench had been greeted with general condemnation by the legal profession, and his notorious servility to the rich and powerful drew on him the contempt of his colleagues. His plight accordingly aroused very little sympathy.

=== Apprehension of Offenders Act 1804 ===
He pleaded for leniency (presumably he finally confessed to having written the letters), but the authorities took a severe view of the matter, and a warrant was issued for his arrest to stand trial in England for seditious libel. This was made possible by the recent passage of an act of Parliament, the Apprehension of Offenders Act 1804 (44 Geo. 3. c. 92) which provided that a warrant issued in England could be transmitted to Ireland and there endorsed for execution by a justice of the peace. Though its enactment was certainly convenient for the prosecution, there is no evidence that, as the Government's critics alleged, it was passed to deal specifically with the Johnson case.

=== Arrest and trial ===
Johnson did everything possible to evade prosecution, petitioning each of his judicial colleagues in vain to cancel the arrest warrant. Finally, Chief Justice Downes, losing patience, had him arrested and sent to London for trial. Downes, who was a very stern man, told Johnson that his attempt to evade justice was as serious a matter as the libel itself. After some further delay he was convicted of seditious libel in the autumn of 1805, but was spared a prison sentence. He was forced to resign from the Bench the following year, although rather surprisingly he was given a pension of £1,200 a year (equivalent to £123,000 in 2023).

== Last years ==
The rest of his long life was spent in retirement at the Derries, his daughter's country house in County Laois. He became increasingly eccentric, and made spirited attacks on whichever Government was in power. In his last years it was said that he talked endlessly about military matters, of which in fact he knew nothing.

On his death his estates passed to his grandson Robert Morellet Alloway (1810–1877); his daughter Margaret Johnson Alloway had died the previous year.

== Sources ==
- Ball, F. Elrington The Judges in Ireland 1221-1921 London John Murray 1926
- Burke, John and Burke, Bernard "Landed Gentry of Great Britain and Ireland" London Henry Colburn 1849
- Cole, G.D.H. The Life of William Cobbett Routledge reprint 2011
- Hart, A.R. A History of the King's Serjeants-at-law at law in Ireland Dublin Four Courts Press 2000
- Memoirs of the life and times of the Right Hon. Henry Grattan Vol. 5 1846
- Nash, Michael L. The Removal of Judges under the Act of Settlement 1701 Glion Institute of Higher Education 2007
- Woods, C.J. "Johnson, Robert" Cambridge Dictionary of Irish Biography
