= Kitty's Amelia (1803 ship) =

History

France
- Name: Jeune Amélie
- Launched: 1802
- Captured: 1803

United Kingdom
- Name: Kitty's Amelia
- Owner: Thomas Clarke, Liverpool
- Builder: France
- Acquired: 1803 by purchase of a prize
- Fate: Foundered early February 1809; disappears from Lloyd's Register after 1809

General characteristics
- Tons burthen: 272 (bm)
- Sail plan: Full-rigged ship
- Complement: 1804: 40; 1807: 42
- Armament: 1804: 18 × 6- & 9-pounder guns; 1807: 6 × 9- & 6-pounder guns + 12 × 18-pounder carronades

Kitty's Amelia, launched in France as Jeune Amélie in 1802, became a Liverpool-based slave ship in the triangular trade after a British letter of marque captured her in 1803. Between 1804 and 1807 she made four voyages transporting enslaved people, including the last legal slaving voyage for a British vessel. She was reported wrecked in 1809.

== Career ==
In 1803 the letter of marque and slaver Kitty captured the French ship Jeune Amèlie as she was returning from the Indian Ocean with a cargo of sugar, indigo, spices, and muslin. (Note: Kitty was a 20-year old ship, of 366 tons (bm), built in Liverpool. Her owner was Clarke & Co. Her master, Alexander Macdonald, had received a letter of marque on 9 August 1803. She was armed with twelve 9- & 12-pounder guns, and had a crew of 50 men. (Alternatively, she was armed with twenty-four 9-pounder guns.))

Kitty's Amelia entered Lloyd's Register in 1804 with Nuttall, master, and Thomas Clarke, owner.

=== 1st voyage transporting enslaved people (1804) ===
Thomas Nuttall received a letter of marque on 17 January 1804. She sailed on 13 February. She was in company with Laurel and Urania. They were out only a few days when they encountered a French warship. Although they took some casualties, they were able to escape. Kitty's Amelia arrived at St Kitts on 3 July, with 286 captives. She left St Kitts on 1 September and went on to Havana. She arrived at Liverpool on 10 October. Kitty's Amelia returned from Havana with a cargo of sugar, cowhides, and cotton. She had left Liverpool with 39 crew members and suffered five deaths on her voyage.

=== 2nd voyage transporting enslaved people (1804–1805) ===
Nuttall sailed on 3 December 1804. She was in company with Thomas and Juno. Kitty's Amelia sailed to West Central Africa and St Helena. Having acquired captives at the Congo River. Kitty's Amelia sailed from Africa on 24 May 1805. She was bound for St Barts, at the time a Swedish colony. (The Swedes did not abolish the slave trade until 1813.) Near Saint Kitts, crewmembers attempted a mutiny, a mutiny that Nuttall foiled. However, three mutineers managed to reach HMS Saint Lucia and accused Nuttall of having engaged in transgressions relating to the transportation of captives. she arrived at St Barts on 5 July, and there landed 210 captives, having embarked 288. The accusations against Nuttall forced him to remain in the Caribbean to answer the charges. Kitty's Amelia's mate, Thomas Forest, sailed her back to Liverpool from St Barts with a cargo of sugar and cotton. She left on 19 August and arrived back at Liverpool on 9 November. She had left Liverpool with 49 crew members and suffered seven crew deaths on the voyage.

=== 3rd voyage transporting enslaved people (1806–1807) ===
Nuttall, having returned to Liverpool after having refuted the charges against him, resumed command of Kitty's Amelia. He sailed on 6 May 1806, bound for the Bight of Biafra and Gulf of Guinea islands.

Kitty's Amelia acquired captives at Bonny. Kitty's Amelia arrived in Barbados, and then sailed to Trinidad, having repulsed an attack by a French privateer. She arrived at Trinidad on 23 October and there landed 280 captives. Nuttall was again forced to remain in the Caribbean, and Forest again sailed her back to Liverpool. Her return cargo consisted of ivory, hides, palm oil, cotton, coffee, indigo, and sugar. She left for Liverpool on 17 February 1807, and arrived there on 20 April. She had left Liverpool with 42 crew members and lost four on the voyage.

=== 4th voyage transporting enslaved people (1807–1808) ===
Kitty's Amelia underwent coppering and repairs in 1807. Then on 1 July 1807 Thomas Forrest received a letter of marque for Kitty's Amelia. The Act for the abolition of the slave trade had passed Parliament in March 1807 and took effect on 1 May 1807. However, Kitty's Amelia had received clearance to sail 27 April, before the deadline. Thus, when she sailed on 27 July, she did so legally. This was the last legal slave voyage for a British vessel. Kitty Amelia's owners had appointed Forest as master, but when Hugh Crow (or Crowe), returned to Liverpool on Mary, they appointed Crow master and relegated Forest to chief mate. (Note: Amongst other vessels, he had captained Will, Ceres, and Mary before sailing on Kitty's Amelia.) In his memoirs, Crow states that he commanded Kitty's Amelia from June 1807. Forrest resented his demotion and on the way to Bonny took every opportunity to undermine Crow's authority. Crow then relieved Forrest of his position. Forrest died on the coast of Africa. (Note: Another source states that Crow sailed on Kitty's Amelia as a supercargo.)

On 27 October 1807 five slavers, one of them Kitty's Amelia, left Bunce Island; they constituted the last legal convoy of British slavers. Because they were on a legal voyage, they qualified for a British Royal Navy escort by the 16-gun sloop HMS Favorite, under the command of Lieutenant Frederick Hoffman (acting). The voyage to Barbados from Sierra Leone took seven weeks. Several times during the voyage Hoffman visited the ships under his care and found them orderly and clean, and the captives healthy. Kitty's Amelia arrived with 233 captives at Jamaica 25 January 1808.

In contrast with Hoffman's assessment of the state of health aboard the slave ships, Crow, in his memoir, recalled that Kitty's Amelia had lost 30 whites and 50 blacks to sickness on the voyage, the whites included her two doctors, who had died shortly after she arrived at Jamaica. He further noted that many of the other slave ships that had hurried to beat the deadline for the end of the trade in enslaved people had lost twice as many blacks.

After loading a cargo for Liverpool, Crow decided to remain at Kingston to deal with some affairs. He entrusted the command of Kitty's Amelia to his friend Captain Thomas Brassey, who had sailed out on the schooner St George, which also belonged to Kitty's Amelia's owners. Brassey left Jamaica 24 April 1808 and sailed to Liverpool with a cargo of beeswax, palm oil, elephants' teeth, Madeira wine, rum, sugar, and coffee, arriving on 30 June. He arrived at Liverpool on 29 June.

Then in 1808 Kitty's Amelia's master became Roberts. She last appeared in Lloyd's Register in 1809 with Roberts, master, and trade Liverpool-The Brazils.

== Fate ==
Lloyd's List reported that Kitty's Amelia had foundered in early February 1809 off Maldonado, Uruguay. She is no longer listed in the 1810 Lloyd's Register.
