= Juverna =

Latin name for Ireland

Juverna or Iuverna is a Latin name for Ireland, a less common variant of Hibernia; both derive from the earlier Iverna. Juverna occurs in the works of Juvenal and Pomponius Mela, although James Watson in 1883 argued these refer to Scotland rather than Ireland.

The name has been used as a poetic synonym for Ireland by Irish nationalists. In 1805 the Irish High Court judge Robert Johnson published letters in William Cobbett's Political Register under the pen-name "Juverna", which criticised the Dublin Castle administration and sympathised with Robert Emmet; Johnson and Cobbett were convicted of seditious libel, and Johnson was forced to resign from the Bench in disgrace. In Benjamin Ward Richardson's 1888 novel The Son of a Star: A Romance of the Second Century, includes the character "gentle Erine, the Maiden of Love" from "Juverna, the island of eternal youth" to the west of Roman Britain. Juverna was a monthly magazine produced by the Christian Brothers in 1902–1903, and its fundraising Juverna Bazaar of May 1903 had a Gaelic revival theme. Juverna gaelic football club won the 1911 Cork Junior Championship. Juverna Press, established by Andrew O'Shaughnessy in 1927, published mainly religious works, including Saint Thérèse of the Child Jesus for the 1932 Eucharistic Congress.

== Ships ==
Several ships were named Juverna, including:

- The schooner Juverna, registered in Portaferry in 1804, which was a slave ship in the triangular trade in enslaved people.
- A barque launched in Waterford in 1838
- A brigantine built 1843 in Red Head, New Brunswick
- A paddle steamer launched in 1847 by the Bristol General Steam Navigation Company for the Cork–Bristol route, on which Michael Doheny fled after the failure of the Young Irelander Rebellion of 1848. It was sold in 1864 for the Union blockade and presumed lost.
- A brig built 1850 in Pictou, Nova Scotia for Robert Hatton (Gorey 1810 – Liverpool 1852)
- A barque based in Sydney from 1859.
- A cargo ship lost in the Irish Sea in 1904.
