= A Tale of Two Sisters (disambiguation) =

A Tale of Two Sisters is a 2003 South Korean horror film.

A Tale of Two Sisters or Tale of Two Sisters may also refer to:

- The Uninvited (2009 film) (working title A Tale of Two Sisters), an English-language remake of the 2003 film
- Tale of Two Sisters, a 1989 American film
- A Tale of Two Sisters (TV series), a 2013 South Korean drama series
- "A Tale of Two Sisters" (Once Upon a Time), a 2014 TV episode
- "A Tale of Two Sisters" (Rapunzel's Tangled Adventure), a 2020 TV episode

== See also ==
- Janghwa Hongryeon jeon
- Two Sisters (disambiguation)
