= Jean Jacques Étienne Lucas =

French Navy officer (1764–1819)

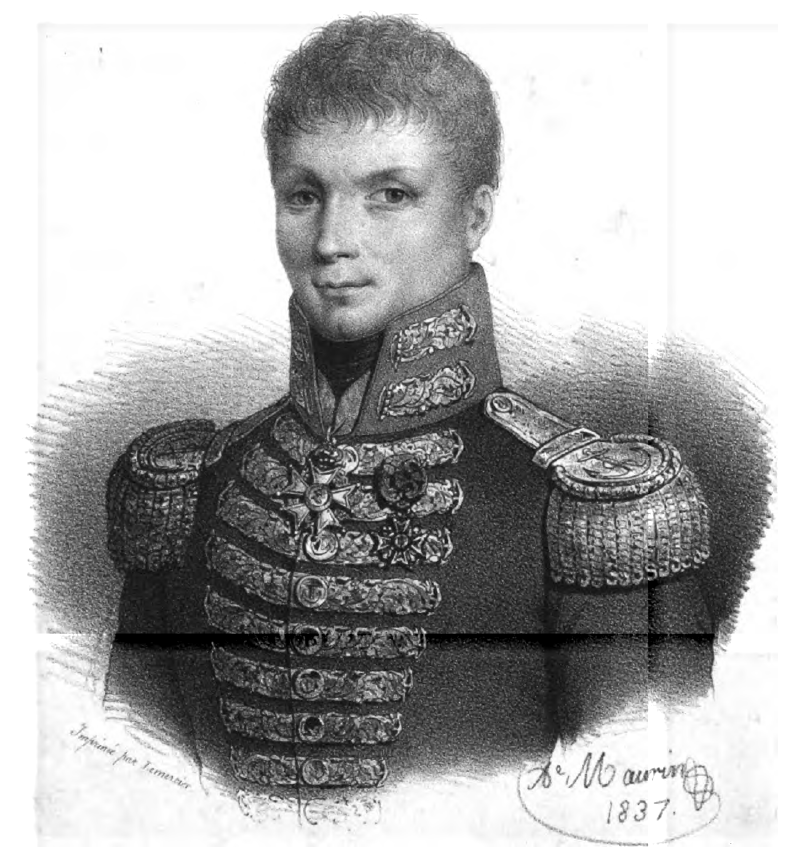
- Born: 28 April 1764; Marennes, France
- Died: 6 November 1819 (aged 55); Brest, France
- Military career
- Allegiance: Kingdom of France; French First Republic; First French Empire
- Rank: Captain
- Conflicts: American Revolutionary War; Action of 21 July 1781; War of the Third Coalition; Battle of Trafalgar (WIA); War of the Fifth Coalition; Battle of the Basque Roads
- Awards: Commandeur of the Legion of Honour

Jean Jacques Étienne Lucas (French pronunciation: [ʒɑ̃ ʒak etjɛn lykɑ]; 28 April 1764 – 6 November 1819) was a French Navy officer who served during the French Revolutionary and Napoleonic Wars. He is best known for his role in the Battle of Trafalgar.

== Career ==
Born in Marennes, Charente-Maritime, he joined the French Navy at the age of 14. From 1779 to 1782 he sailed on the Hermione. During this period, he fought at the action of 21 July 1781 as part of the American Revolutionary War.

=== The Battle of Trafalgar ===
He is primarily remembered for his role in the Battle of Trafalgar. By 1805, Lucas was a capitaine de vaisseau, the French title for captain. He commanded the French ship of the line Redoutable.

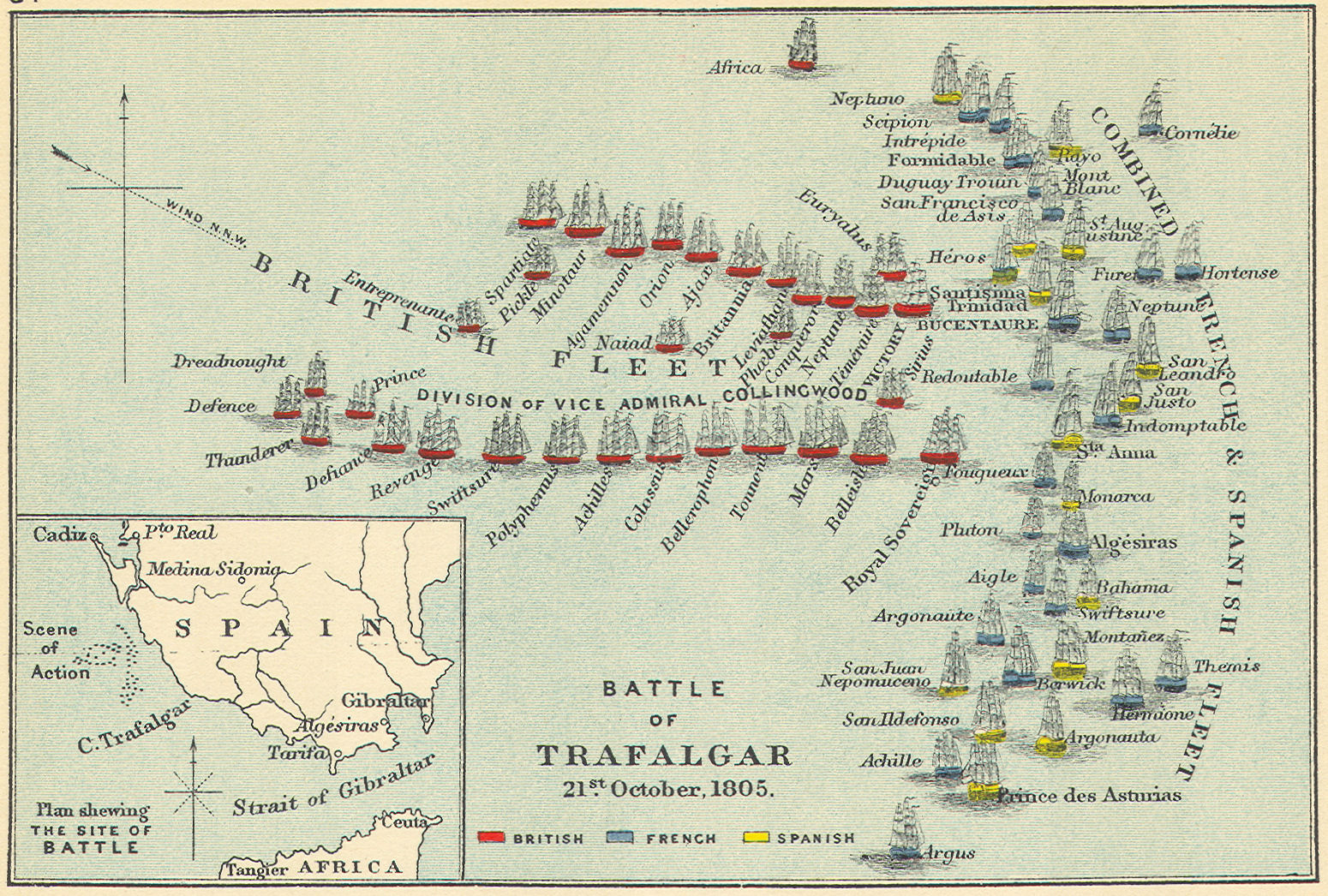
A map of the positioning of the two navies during the Battle of Trafalgar. Redoutable is dead-centre in the Franco-Spanish fleet.

On 21 October 1805, at Trafalgar, Redoutable was located just off the port side of the Bucentaure, flagship of Admiral Pierre-Charles Villeneuve. As a result of this positioning, Lucas and his crew found themselves between the two columns of British ships commanded by Lord Nelson and in the heat of battle from very early on in the conflict. They engaged HMS Victory, Nelson's flagship, and through use of heavy artillery they came astern of Victory and sought to board her.

The battle aboard Victory was bloody, costing both sides many lives and ultimately resulting in stalemate. Admiral Nelson himself was mortally wounded by a musket shot fired from atop one of the masts of the Redoutable, but before the boarding was successful, HMS Temeraire intervened and opened fire on the starboard side of Redoutable, resulting in the deaths of over two hundred French sailors.

At 2:30 p.m., Redoutable surrendered to Temeraire after having lost 522 men out of their total 643. Of this number, 300 were killed and 222 were wounded. Lucas himself was injured, and the ship had suffered damage which had led to the hold taking on several feet of water. The masts had been broken and there was substantial damage to the rest of the ship, including the artillery.

HMS Swiftsure sent a party to take Lucas and two other officers off the ship into captivity the following morning. Redoutable, however, was still taking on water, and despite the efforts of rescue boats sent over the course of the day, only 119 crewmen were saved before the ship sank with the dead and wounded still on board.

Lucas was received in England with great courtesy. After his release from capture, he was personally awarded the rank of Commandeur of the Legion of Honour by Napoleon for his role during the battle.

=== Battle of the Basque Roads ===
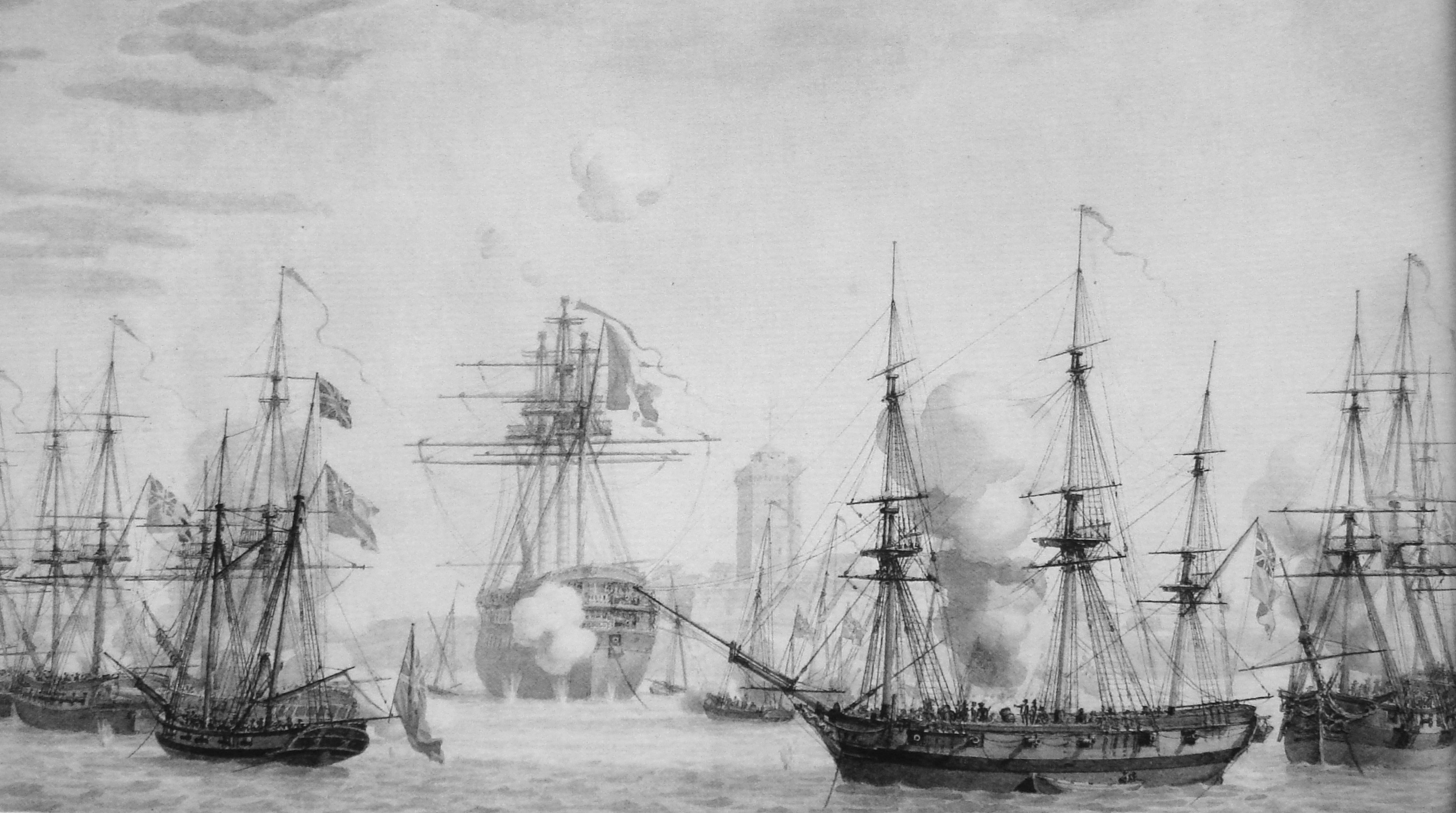
Régulus, stranded in the mud in front of Fouras and under attack by British ships (Louis-Philippe Crépin)

In 1809, he was in command of Régulus, a Téméraire-class 74-gun ship of the line which was part of Zacharie Allemand's squadron. The squadron was at first blockaded, and then attacked on 11 April 1809 by a British fleet, near Île-d'Aix, in what would become known as the Battle of the Basque Roads.

After breaching the boom that defended the anchored French fleet, the British sent in fire ships, with Régulus being the first to be attacked. The ship's crew cut her anchor cables and managed to escape from one of the fire ships after a half-hour struggle. Régulus ran aground and was in danger of capsizing; trying to save his ship, Lucas threw overboard most of her cannons, keeping only 16 of them together with ammunition and supplies for one month. He managed to refloat Régulus, but she ran aground a second time on the shoals of Les Palles.

On 13 April, several British ships attempted to destroy the grounded Régulus as they had done to several other French warships, but after a six-hour fight the attackers withdrew. Seven days later, Régulus was attacked by the bomb vessel HMS Thunder, but the attacking ship's gun split almost immediately after opening fire and was forced to withdraw. On 24 April, Lucas ordered six new portholes to be cut in Régulus's hull as she had listed too far for her existing portholes to be able to engage enemy targets. This allowed for him to defend Régulus for a third time from a British attack, which lasted for 8½ hours.

After being grounded for two weeks, defending against four attacks, firing almost 1,400 cannon shots, Régulus was in a bad shape, but on the night of 25 April the British withdrew after having destroyed four French ships of the line, one frigate and severely damaged all the other French ships. Four days later, on 29 April, Lucas managed to patch and refloat his ship, which entered Rochefort to the cheers of the local population.

=== Later life and death ===
During the Hundred Days, Lucas sided with Napoleon. After the second Bourbon Restoration in France, Lucas retired from the Navy in 1816, and died on 6 November 1819 in Brest, France.
