= French frigate Président =

History

France
- Name: Minerve
- Ordered: 25 January 1801
- Builder: Nantes (Crucy company), plans by Forfait
- Laid down: September 1802
- Launched: 4 June 1804
- Commissioned: 20 July 1804
- Out of service: 28 September 1806
- Renamed: Président

United Kingdom
- Name: President
- Acquired: by capture September 1806
- Renamed: Piemontaise
- Honours and awards: Naval General Service Medal with clasp "Java"
- Fate: Broken up 1815

General characteristics
- Type: Frigate
- Tons burthen: 1148 bm
- Length: 46 metres (151 ft)
- Beam: 12 metres (39 ft)
- Draught: 7 metres (23 ft)
- Complement: 330 men
- Armament: French service rated 40 guns: Battery: 28 × 18-pounder long guns; Quarterdeck and forecastle: 12 × 8-pounder long guns; British service rated 38 guns: Battery: 28 × 18-pounder long guns; Quarterdeck: 14 × 32-pounder carronades; Forecastle: 2 × 9-pounder long guns + 2 × 32-pounder carronades

Président was a 40-gun frigate of the Gloire class in the French Navy, built to an 1802 design by Pierre-Alexandre Forfait. She served with the French Navy from her completion in 1804 until late 1806 when the Royal Navy captured her. Thereafter, she served as HMS President. In 1815 the Navy renamed her Piemontaise, but then broke her up in December.

== French service ==
Originally ordered under the name Minerve, the frigate was renamed as Président on 24 December 1803.

She took part in L'Hermite's expedition, which led to her capture. Before she was captured, on 6 January 1806 she helped capture the 16-gun sloop HMS Favourite.

== Capture ==
In June 1806, Captain Thomas George Shortland took command of HMS Canopus. She was the flagship for a squadron under Rear Admiral Sir Thomas Louis. On 27 September, they fell in with Président, Capt. Gallier Labrosse, south of the Isles of Scilly, near Belle Île. Président had been sailing with the ship of the line Régulus, frigate Cybèle and corvette Surveillant, but had separated from them on 20 August.

Louis's squadron had sailed to the Bay of Biscay to await the return of Admiral Willaumez from the Caribbean Sea. On spotting Président, the squadron gave chase but the ships of the line were not fast enough to catch her. However, an 18-gun Cruizer-class brig-sloop attached to the squadron, Dispatch, Captain Edward Hawkins, was able to get within firing range. Dispatch proceeded to harry Président with her forward guns, forcing Président to turn towards the nearest British frigate, HMS Blanche, under Captain Sir Thomas Lavie. Seeing Président turn, Louis ordered Canopus to fire, even though the range was extreme. Realizing that the rest of the British squadron would arrive shortly, Labrosse struck his colours to Dispatch. Président had suffered only minor damage and there were no casualties on either side in the action.

The Royal Navy took her into service as HMS President (dropping the accent over the 'e' in her name). The frigate's design was much admired and she served as the model for a number of later frigates, notably the Seringapatam class in the Royal Navy.

== Cruising ==
In December 1807, she was commissioned under the command of Captain Adam Mackenzie, sailing for South America on 7 May 1808 after completion conversion for British service at Plymouth. Mackenzie commanded her until 1810, apart from a brief period in 1809, when Captain Charles Schomberg temporarily commanded her off Brazil while Mackenzie temporarily commanded Bedford.

In 1810 Captain Samuel Warren took command and on 31 December sailed her for the Cape of Good Hope and thence to the East Indies. In the East Indies she took part in the operations in Java and the rest of the Dutch East Indies. In 1811, President was attached to the squadron of Admiral Robert Stopford that captured Java. On 31 August the frigates Nisus, President, Phoebe, and Hesper were detached to take the seaport of Cheribon. In 1847 the Admiralty authorized the issuance of the Naval General Service Medal with clasp "Java" to all remaining survivors of the campaign.

Returning to the UK in late 1812 or early 1813, President then served from May 1813 in the Irish Sea, first under Captain Francis Mason, then from April 1814 under Captain Archibald Duff.

On 21 March 1814, President was in company with the brig-sloop Bacchus and the gun-brig Constant off Finisterre as they escorted a fleet from Cork to Portugal.

== Fate ==
In August 1815, the Royal Navy renamed her HMS Piedmontaise but broke her up in December of that same year.

== Post script ==
President was the model for three later British 44-gun frigates:

- HMS Africaine (1827)
- HMS Maeander (1840)
- HMS Stag (1830)
