= HMS Bermuda (1813) =

Captured American pilot boat and ROyal Navy schooner (1813–1817)

History

United States
- Launched: June 1812
- Captured: c.1813

United Kingdom
- Name: HMS Bermuda
- Acquired: By gift of a prize
- Fate: Broken up 1817

General characteristics
- Tons burthen: 43, or 4445/94 by calc., or 90 (bm)
- Length: Overall: 46 ft 2 in (14.1 m); Keel: c.36 ft (11.0 m)
- Beam: 15 ft 0 in (4.6 m)
- Depth of hold: 5 ft 6 in (1.7 m)
- Armament: 1 × 6-pounder gun (Note: The prisoners who escaped reported the gun was stowed in Bermuda's hold.)

HMS Bermuda was a schooner that had been a pilot boat on the Delaware River. Her captors presented her to the Royal Navy in 1813, which registered her on 28 April 1814.

Escaped American prisoners of war seized her at Bermuda in 1814 and sailed her to the United States. The 11 prisoners were held on HMS Goree at Bermuda when on 21 April 1814 they were taken in a launch to gather water from the tanks. On a signal they overpowered Goree's bosun and their two guards from the 102nd Regiment of Foot, and rowed to Bermuda. There they chased the five men aboard – her captain, a pilot, and three seamen, below deck – put the bosun and guards in her boat, and set sail. They reached Cape May, New Jersey on 28 April. There a number of British warships pursued them. As the pilot boat Pennsylvania approached, laden with British personnel, the escapees ran Bermuda on shore and escaped.

The Royal Navy recaptured Bermuda. Commander John Sykes commissioned her in November 1814 on the Jamaica station. She was broken up in February 1817.
