= Laurel (1790 ship) =

British merchant, slave, and privateer ship (1790–1803)

History

Great Britain
- Name: Laurel
- Namesake: Lauraceae
- Launched: 1790, Bermuda
- Captured: 14 June 1803
- Notes: Built of Bermuda cedar

France
- Name: Laurel
- Operator: French Navy
- Acquired: 1803, by capture
- Fate: Sold May 1806

General characteristics
- Tons burthen: 117 (bm)
- Sail plan: Brig
- Complement: 40
- Armament: 12 × 6&12-pounder cannons

Laurel was launched in 1790. She first appeared in online British sources in 1802. She made one voyage from Liverpool as a slave ship in the triangular trade in enslaved people. On her return to Liverpool she became a privateer, but was captured in June 1803 after having herself captured a French merchant vessel.

== Career ==
Laurel first appeared in Lloyd's Register (LR), in 1802.

Year	Master	Owner	Trade	Source
1802	H.Baldwin	M'dowall	Liverpool–Africa	LR

Captain Henry Baldwin sailed from Liverpool on 13 August 1802. In 1802, 155 vessels sailed from English ports, bound for Africa to acquire and transport enslaved people; 122 of these vessels sailed from Liverpool.

Baldwin acquired captives at Cape Mount. Laurel arrived at Trinidad on 29 January 1803 with 124 captives, that she sold there. She sailed from Trinidad on 20 February and arrived back at Liverpool on 20 April. She had left Liverpool with 15 crew members and suffered three crew deaths on her voyage. (Note: The Trans-Atlantic Slave trade database shows Laurel's master changing from Baldwin to Gould, but this is a case of confusion of vessels. Gould was captain of Laurel, which too had sailed to Africa in 1802 or 1803, and returned in 1803. The database also shows Laurel as having sailed on to Savannah before returning to Liverpool, though there is no evidence in Lloyd's List's ship arrival and departure data of such a stop.)

The Peace of Amiens had just failed before Laurel returned from her voyage transporting enslaved people. Captain Edward Oldham Bennet acquired a letter of marque on 25 May 1803 for the ship Laurel, of 117 tons (bm). She had a complement of 40 men, consistent with cruising as a privateer; a crew larger than was sufficient to sail the vessel was necessary to provide crews for enemy vessels taken in prize.

In June 1803 Lloyd's List reported that the "Laurel privateer" had taken and sent into Liverpool a ship of 300 tons (bm). The ship had been on a voyage from Cette to Rouen, and the capture had taken place off Ushant.

The French captured Laurel on 14 June 1803. Oldham was paroled as he appears in a wedding announcement dated 11 August 1804. Some or all of his crew, however, ended up as prisoners. One was at the citadel in Bitche, in Lorraine, near the border with Germany. On 22 August 1806 Lieutenant M'Dougall, identified as the lieutenant of the privateer Laurel, of Liverpool, escaped with Midshipman Mottley, late of HMS Minerve. They reached Hamburg where the British consul facilitated their passage to Husum. An English packet then took them back Harwich, where they arrived on 1 October. They had made much of their 600-mile land journey on foot, without shoes.

The Register of Shipping carried Laurel in the 1804 issue (without reflecting any change in command), but not in the issue for 1806. (The issue for 1805, if any, is not available online.) Lloyd's Register continued to carry Laurel into the volume for 1813, but with data unchanged since 1802.

== Fate ==
French records show French frigate Didon capturing the British merchant or privateer brig Laurel on 13 October 1803, though the month may simply represent the month of commissioning. Laurel was armed with six 6-pounders and six 12-pounder carronades. The French took her into service as Laurel. She was reported out of commission in La Rochelle in March 1806, and sold in May 1806.
