= Two Sisters (1797 ship) =

History

Great Britain
- Name: Two Sisters
- Launched: 1797, or 1798, Arichat, Cape Breton Island, Nova Scotia
- Fate: Last listed in 1813

General characteristics
- Tons burthen: 52, or 59, or 60 (bm)
- Sail plan: Schooner, later brig

Two Sisters was launched in 1797 in Nova Scotia and in 1804 shifted her registry to the United Kingdom. A French privateer captured her in 1804 but two members of her crew (a man and a boy) were able to take control of her after the prize crew abandoned her. They were able to reach an English port after almost three weeks. Two Sisters became a coaster and was last listed in 1813.

== Career ==
Two Sisters first appeared in Lloyd's Register in 1804.

Year	Master	Owner	Trade	Source & notes
1804	H.White	J.Crews	Dartmouth–Newfoundland	LR; large repair 1804

Lloyd's List (LL) reported in September 1804 that the French privateer Uncle Thomas had captured at 40°30′N 25°10′W two vessels, Mary, of Greenock, which had been sailing to Virginia, and Two Sisters, of Dartmouth, which had been sailing from Newfoundland. (Note: Mary is unfortunately a common name for vessels. Still, she appears to have been Mary, J.Hilton, master, of 238 tons (bm), launched in New England in 1794, and American owned but British-registered. Her entry in LR gave her trade as Greenock–Virginia.) Polly brought into Penzance on 3 September 11 crew from the vessels. (Note: Polly was a government transport, coming from Jamaica with French prisoners of war from San Domingo, 23 of whom had died on the voyage. When she arrived at Plymouth she went into quarantine. She was a cartel; she had come from Port Royal and was to go on to France.)

The French prize master sailed Two Sisters for Ushant. As she approached the port the French prize crew sighted some sails that they thought might be British naval vessels, and took to her boats, abandoning her, and her mate and a boy who had been part of the original crew and whom the French had kept on board. The two had no compass, quadrant, or the like, and few provisions. The two were at sea for some 20 days before they succeeded in reaching Ilfracombe. LL reported that Two Sisters had been taken, retaken, and had come into Ilfracombe.

Year	Master	Owner	Trade	Source & notes
1805	H.White; Efford	J.Crews	Dartmouth–Newfoundland	LR; large repair 1804

The entry in LR carried the notation "captured", but struck through.

Year	Master	Owner	Trade	Source & notes
1808	Harvey	J.Crews	Dartmouth–Wales	LR; large repair 1804 & small repairs 1807

== Fate ==
Two Sisters was last listed in 1813.
