= HMS Demerara (1806) =

Sloop of the Royal Navy

History

United Kingdom
- Name: HMS Demerara
- Acquired: 1806 by purchase of a prize
- Honours and awards: Naval General Service Medal (NGSM) with clasp "Martinique"
- Fate: Sold 1813

General characteristics
- Tons burthen: 220 (bm)

HMS Demerara was the French privateer Cosmopoli, launched, captured, and purchased in 1806. She spent her entire career in the West Indies. In 1809 she participated in the capture of Martinique. Demerara was sold in 1813.

== Career ==
The inhabitants of Demerara purchased Cosmopoli on 9 February 1806, and presented her to the Royal Navy.

Commander William Maude commissioned Demerara in the Leeward Islands and she was in service by 17 March 1806. He was promoted to post captain on 26 September 1807. Commander William Shepheard replaced him.Demerara captured a Spanish privateer and completely suppressed the depredations of the enemy’s row-boats from the Oronoco river, which earned him the thanks and a gift from the British merchants there.

On 20 April 1808 Commander Henry Bouchier was promoted to Commander and replaced Shepheard.

In November 1808 William Dowers took command of Demerara. Demerara participated in the capture of Martinique in February 1809. In 1847 the Admiralty awarded the surviving claimants from the campaign the Naval General Service Medal with clasp "Martinique".

Commander Thomas Hunloke replaced Dowers. Commander William H. Smith assumed command of Demerara on 2 May 1810.

== Fate ==
Demerara was sold on 12 June 1813.
