= Two Sisters (1799 ship) =

History

Great Britain
- Name: Two Sisters
- Launched: United States, or taken in prize
- Acquired: 1799 by purchase
- Fate: Condemned 1802

General characteristics
- Tons burthen: 133, or 150 (bm)
- Armament: 10 × 9-pounder + 2 × 4-pounder guns

Two Sisters was possibly built in the United States, or taken in 1798, as a prize of unknown origin. She became a slave ship sailing out of Liverpool. She made two complete voyages in the triangular trade in enslaved people. She was condemned at Kingston in 1802, after she had delivered her captives on her third voyage transporting enslaved people.

== Career ==
Two Sisters first appeared in Lloyd's Register (LR) in 1799.

Year	Master	Owner	Trade	Source
1799	S.Sinclair	Beggs & Co.	Liverpool–Africa	LR; large repair 1799

1st voyage transporting enslaved people (1799–1800): Captain John Sinclair sailed from Liverpool on 26 December 1799, bound for the Windward Coast. In 1799, 156 vessels sailed from English ports bound for Africa to acquire and transport enslaved people; 134 of these vessels sailed from Liverpool.

Two Sisters acquired slaves between Rio Nuñez and the Assini River. She arrived at St Vincent on 14 June 1800, with 161 captives. She sailed for Liverpool on 3 July, and arrived back at Liverpool on 6 September. She had left Liverpool with eight crew members and suffered one crew deaths on her voyage.

2nd voyage transporting enslaved people (1800–1801): Captain Sinclair sailed from Liverpool on 19 November 1800, bound for the Windward Coast. In 1800, 133 vessels sailed from English ports bound for Africa to acquire and transport enslaved people; 120 of these vessels sailed from Liverpool.

Two Sisters sailed from the Nuñez–Assini region on 7 February 1801, and arrived in Demerara on 12 March, with 165 captives. She sailed for Liverpool on 12 March, and arrived there on 4 July. She had left Liverpool with 18 crew members and she suffered 13 crew deaths on her voyage. When she arrived at Liverpool her cargo consisted of 50 hogsheads of sugar, 80 bales of cotton, 150 elephants teeth (ivory tusks), 400 pounds of bees wax, and two mahogany logs.

3rd voyage transporting enslaved people (1801–Loss): Captain Sinclair sailed from Liverpool on 10 August 1801, bound for the Windward Coast. In 1802, 155 vessels sailed from English ports bound for Africa to acquire and transport enslaved people; 122 of these vessels sailed from Liverpool.

Two Sisters acquired captives in the Nuñez–Assini region and arrived at Demerara on 15 January 1802, with 160 captives. She had left Liverpool with 22 crew members and suffered seven crew death on her voyage.

== Loss ==
Two Sisters was condemned at Demerara after she had disembarked her captives.

Sinclair died on 10 February 1806, as captain of Sally as she was returning to Liverpool from a voyage transporting enslaved people.
