= Sarah (1803 ship) =

Privateer and slave ship

History

United Kingdom
- Name: Sarah
- Owner: Robert Kitchen
- Launched: 1803, Liverpool
- Captured: 1805

General characteristics
- Tons burthen: 207 (bm)
- Propulsion: Sail
- Complement: 1803:30; 1805:35
- Armament: 1803:14 × 6-pounder guns; 1805:16 × 6-pounder guns

Sarah was launched at Liverpool in 1803. She made a short voyage as a privateer during which she captured a valuable prize. She then made two voyages as a slave ship in the triangular trade in enslaved people. A French naval squadron captured her early in her third enslaving voyage.

== Career ==
Sarah entered Lloyd's Register (LR), in 1803 with John Sellars, master, R. Kitchen, owner, and trade Liverpool–Africa. John Sillars acquired a letter of marque on 16 June 1803.

Lloyd's List reported on 21 October 1803 that Sarah and Ann had captured City of Lyons (Ville de Lyon) as she was sailing from Île de France to Bordeaux and that she had arrived at Liverpool. The captors actually were Sarah, Captain Sellars, and Ann Parr, Captain Baldwin. (Note: Ann Parr was launched in 1796 at Bordeaux under another name and taken in prize. She first entered Lloyd's Register in 1803.])Ville de Lyons, of some 400 tons (bm), was carrying a cargo of tea, pepper, indigo, etc., valued at about £26,000.

1st enslaving voyage (1803–1804): Captain John Sillars sailed from Liverpool on 5 November 1803. Sarah purchased captives at the Cameroons and arrived at Kingston, Jamaica, on 11 September 1804. There she landed 200 captives. She arrived back at Liverpool on 18 October 1804. She had left Liverpool with 37 crew members and she suffered two crew deaths on the voyage.

Lloyd's Register for 1804 showed Sarah's master changing from J. Sellars to J. McClane.

2nd enslaving voyage (1804–1805): Captain John McLune sailed from Liverpool on 28 November 1804. He was issued a letter of marque on 7 February 1805, hence in absentia. Sarah purchased captives at Lagos/Onim. She landed 233 captives at Demerara on 11 May 1805, and left there on 10 July. She arrived back at Liverpool on 24 September 1805. She had left Liverpool with 35 crew members and she suffered ten crew deaths during the voyage.

== Fate ==
Captain John McLune sailed Sarah from Liverpool on 26 October 1805 on her 3rd enslaving voyage. Sarah, M'Lune, master, and Diamond, Jameson, master, were reported "all well" at 10°17′N 13°21′W. On 1 March 1806, Otway, and one other enslaving ship were "all well" off the "Logus Coast" of Africa. Four days later Lloyd's List reported that L'Hermite's squadron of the French Navy had captured Sarah, Otway, Lord Nelson, Mary, Adams, master, and Nelson, Meath, master, off the coast of Africa. At the time of her capture Sarah had not yet embarked any captives.

In 1806, 33 British enslaving ships were lost. Twenty-three were lost on the coast of Africa. War, not maritime hazards nor slave resistance, was the greatest cause of vessel losses among British slave vessels.
