= Trio (1801 ship) =

United Kingdom
- Name: Trio
- Owner: 1801-1805:Various; 1805:George Johnson, Henry Head, Cooper Hasler, & James Hasler
- Builder: New Brunswick
- Launched: 1801
- Captured: January 1806

General characteristics
- Tons burthen: 120, or 126, or 136 (bm)
- Sail plan: Brig
- Complement: 25
- Armament: 10 × 6-pounder guns
- Notes: Built of black birch and pine

Trio was launched at New Brunswick in 1801 and sailed to England. She became a merchant ship trading between Dublin and Montreal. From 1805 new owners sought to employ her as a slave ship in the triangular trade in enslaved people, but the French Navy captured her in January 1806 early in her first enslaving voyage.

== Career and capture ==
Trio first entered Lloyd's Register (LR) in 1802.

Year	Master	Owner	Trade	Source
1802	Shannon	Greenock	Dublin	LR
1804	Shannon; A. Thompson	Greenock; Scott & Sons	Dublin; Greenock–Montreal	LR
1805	Thompson; J. Hassler	Scott & Sons; P. Johnson & Co.	Greenock–Montreal; Liverpool–Africa	LR

Captain James Hassler sailed from Liverpool on 21 September 1805, bound for West Africa. Lloyd's List reported on 8 April 1806, that a French squadron consisting of an 84-gun ship-of-the-line and three frigates had captured Trio, Lord Nelson, and the sloop-of-war HMS Favourite off the coast of Africa.

L'Hermite's squadron captured Trio in January off Sierra Leone. The French made a cartel of her and she arrived at Falmouth on 7 April 1806 with the crew of Favourite, which the French had captured on 6 January. She then sailed on to Plymouth. The entry for Trio in Lloyd's Register has the notation "captured" above her name.

In 1806, 33 British slaving vessels were lost. Twenty-three of these were lost on the coast of Africa. During the period 1793 to 1807, war, rather than maritime hazards or resistance by the captives, was the greatest cause of vessel losses among British enslaving vessels.

== Spilsbury's log ==
Francis B. Spilsbury was the surgeon aboard Favorite and he kept a log of her voyage to Africa.

The French captured Trio on 22 January at Cape Mount. The French swept into the bay where they found Trio and three American vessels. Trio fired a gun and then struck. The French sold the female slaves Trio had gathered to the Americans and divided the male slaves among the French vessels. The French made a cartel of Trio, and on 24 January, after looting almost all the possessions of Favorite's crew, put her crew on board Trio. The French also put on board the crews of Trio, Robert, of Liverpool, Hero, of Glasgow, Flora, of London, and Belle, of Greenock. L'Hermite provided sufficient provisions for 150 men for five days. On the 25th some of the men from the merchantmen became mutinous. Captain John Davie, of Favourite, read the Articles of War and gave the ringleaders 36 lashes each; this ended the mutiny. Trio had 160 men aboard and reached Freetown, Sierra Leone, on 2 February. Trio reached Crookhaven on 29 March where she took on provisions. However, Trio's mate and surgeon deserted. Trio reached Falmouth on 8 April.

== Post script ==
Under the rules governing cartels, Trio would probably have sailed on to France, carrying French prisoners in exchange for the British prisoners she had brought. Although the Registers continue to list Trio until 1810, the data is stale, unchanging from 1806.
