= French corvette Surveillant =

Surveillant
History

France
- Name: Surveillant
- Laid down: 1799
- Launched: 4 August 1800
- Commissioned: 20 February 1802
- Fate: Scrapped, 1811

General characteristics
- Type: Corvette
- Armament: 16 guns

The Surveillant was a 16-gun brig of the French Navy, built in 1799, launched the next year, and put in service in 1802.

She took part in L'Hermite's expedition before returning to France carrying despatches.

She was demolished in 1811.
