= HMS Favourite (1794) =

Sloop of the Royal Navy

- Favourite

History

Great Britain
- Name: HMS Favourite
- Ordered: 18 February 1793
- Builder: Randall & Brent, Rotherhithe
- Laid down: April 1793
- Launched: 1 February 1794
- Completed: By 14 May 1794
- Captured: By the French on 6 January 1806

France
- Name: Favorite
- Acquired: 6 January 1806 by capture
- Captured: 27 January 1807, by the Royal Navy

United Kingdom
- Name: HMS Goree
- Acquired: 27 January 1807
- Reclassified: Prison ship in 1813/14
- Honours and awards: Naval General Service Medal with clasp "Martinque"
- Fate: Broken up in 1817

General characteristics
- Class & type: 16-gun Cormorant-class sloop
- Tons burthen: 42688/94 bm
- Length: 108 ft 5 in (33.0 m) (overall); 90 ft 8 1/4 in (27.6 m) (keel)
- Beam: 29 ft 9 in (9.1 m)
- Depth of hold: 9 ft (2.7 m)
- Propulsion: Sails
- Sail plan: Sloop
- Complement: British service:121; French service:150
- Armament: Originally:16 × 6-pounder guns + 12 × ½-pounder swivel guns; French capture:18 × 6-pounder guns + 11 × 12-pounder carronades; British capture:16 × 6-pounder guns + 13 × 12-pounder carronades

HMS Favourite (or Favorite) was a 16-gun Cormorant-class sloop of the Royal Navy, launched in 1794 at Rotherhithe. The French captured her in 1806 and renamed her Favorite. However, the British recaptured her in 1807 and renamed her HMS Goree. She became a prison ship in 1810 and was broken up in Bermuda in 1817.

== French Revolutionary Wars ==
=== Commander James Athol Wood ===
Favourite was commissioned in March 1794 under Commander Charles White. In September of the next year Commander James Athol Wood took command and sailed her for the Leeward Islands.

Favourite's first task was to assist in the quelling of insurrections on Grenada and St. Vincent. (Note: On Grenada Julien Fédon, a "free coloured" French-African planter, led a pro-French revolt between 1795 and 1796. On St. Vincent there was conflict between the British and the Black Caribs, who were led by defiant Paramount Chief Joseph Chatoyer. In 1796 British General Sir Ralph Abercromby put an end to the open conflict by crushing a revolt that the French radical Victor Hugues had instigated.) In support of these operations, Captain Robert Otway of Mermaid had Wood patrol the waters to intercept vessels carrying provisions to the insurgents.

On 5 February 1796 Favourite captured two French privateers and ran one ashore within the Bocas Islands between Trinidad and Venezuela. The largest privateer was the Général Rigaud, of eight guns and 45 men, mostly Italians and Spaniards. The second privateer was the packet ship Hind, which the Général Rigaud had taken off St. Vincent's. Her crew escaped before Favourite could take possession. The vessel that ran ashore was the Banan.

Less than a month later, on 1 March, Favourite, the armed transport Sally, and two large sloops that Wood commandeered, evacuated 11-1200 British troops from Sauteurs, where an insurgent force had trapped them. The next day Woods delivered the troops safely to St. George's.

A week later, on 9 March, Favourite encountered three vessels windward of Grenada. They were two French privateer schooners, one of 10 guns and one of 12, and a ship of 14 guns. After an all-day chase, Favourite was able to capture the ship without a fight; the two schooners escaped. (Note: Biographies of Wood state that when he captured the ship he also captured the vessel's private night signals, enabling him to capture her two consorts later that night. If so, Wood did not mention the subsequent captures in his letter reporting the capture of the Susanna.) The ship turned out to be Susanna, of Liverpool, which the privateers had captured a few days earlier and manned to also serve as a privateer. In all, Favourite ended up with 70 prisoners. Wood distributed most of them in two or three-man groups to the transports and merchant vessels of a convoy heading for Britain. The officers he put aboard Charlotte.

On 22 July Mermaid and Favorite recaptured the sloop Two Sisters. In November Favourite was enforcing a blockade of the port of Paramaribo.

In January 1797, Wood reconnoitered Trinidad for General Sir Ralph Abercromby. Admiral Sir Henry Harvey, commander-in-chief for the Navy in the Leeward Islands then had Wood draw up a plan for an attack. The result was that in February, Favourite was at the capture of Trinidad. The flotilla sailed from Carriacou on 15 February and arrived off Port of Spain on the next day. At Port of Spain they found a Spanish squadron consisting of four ships of the line and a frigate, all under the command of Rear-Admiral Don Sebastian Ruiz de Apodaca. Harvey sent Favourite and some of the other smaller ships to protect the transports and anchored his own ships of the line opposite the Spanish squadron. At 2am on 17 February the British discovered that four of the five Spanish vessels were on fire; they were able to capture the 74-gun San Domaso but the others were destroyed. (Note: The five Spanish ships were San Vincente (Captain Don Geronimo Mendoza; 84 guns), Gallardo (Captain Don Gabriel Sororido; 74 guns), Arrogante (Captain Don Raphael Benasa; 74 guns), San Damaso (Don Tores Jordan; 74 guns), and Santa Cecilia (Captain Don Manuel Urtesabel; 36 guns).) Later that morning General Sir Ralph Abercrombie landed the troops; Wood, together with Captain Wolley of Arethusa, superintended the landing. The Governor of Trinidad, José Maria Chacón, surrendered the next day. Favourite shared with the rest of the flotilla in the allocation of £40,000 for the proceeds of the ships taken at Trinidad and of the property found on the island. On 27 March Wood received his promotion to post captain and command of San-Damaso. He then sailed her to England as escort to a large convoy.

=== Lieutenant Lord Camelford ===
Wood's replacement, in May 1797, was Commander S. Powell. Some months later, in July, Commander James Hanson assumed command. Then Thomas Pitt, Lieutenant Lord Camelford, took command, replacing Hanson, who had taken ill. (Note: Pitt was a cousin of the then Prime Minister, William Pitt.) Although Camelford was apparently appointed in January, he had been acting captain for some time. On 13 January 1798, Camelford shot and killed Lieutenant Charles Peterson, acting captain of Perdrix for mutiny, in a dispute over which of them was senior to the other. At the time, both vessels were in English Harbour, Antigua, serving as guardships. What triggered the dispute was the departure from the harbour on the previous day of HMS Babet, whose captain, Jemmet Mainwaring, had previously been the senior officer in the port. Peterson had been first lieutenant under Camelford for three months when Camelford had taken over Favourite, even though Peterson was senior on the lieutenants' list and represented Captain Fahie of Perdrix, who was away in St. Kitts. The two ships' companies almost fired on each other when Camelford shot Petersen. Captain Henry Mitford of Matilda arrived that evening and put Camelford under arrest. Mitford put Lieutenant Parsons of Favourite in command of Perdrix and sent her out to sea. The subsequent court martial acquitted Camelford. (Note: Camelford died in a duel in 1804. Apparently few people regretted his demise.)

=== Commander Joseph Westbeach ===
In May 1799, Commander Joseph Westbeach took command and in July/August sailed her home with the trade. She then sailed in the North Sea.

On 15 January 1801, Favourite captured a cutter off Flamborough Head, after a seven-hour chase. The cutter proved to be the French privateer Voyageur, of 14 guns and 47 men, under the command of Egide Colbert. Colbert was four days out of Ostend and the day before had captured the merchant vessel Camilla, of Sunderland, which had been sailing in ballast.

Two months later, on 13 March, Favourite chased a lugger for eleven hours from Scarborough before losing her. She then saw another sail, which she pursued and captured. She was the French privateer schooner Optimiste, of Dunkirk, armed with 14 guns and had a crew of 47 men under the command of Jean Baptiste Corenwinder.

Then on 17 April, Favourite captured a French privateer lugger off Plymouth after a four-hour chase. The lugger was the Antichrist, armed with fourteen 2 and 9-pounder guns. She had a crew of 60 men under the command of Henry Alexandre Scorffery. She was 15 days out of Dunkirk and Favourite recaptured her sole prize, the ship Brotherly Love, of South Shields, which had been sailing to London when she was captured.

Between May 1803 and June 1804, Favourite underwent repairs at Sheerness.

== Napoleonic Wars ==
Commander Charles Foote commissioned Favourite in May 1804. On 1 August she then participated in a bombardment of Le Havre. Favourite was among the vessels that shared in the proceeds of the capture on 15 September of the Flora de Lisboa.

On 12 December 1804, Favorite encountered two French privateer luggers and gave chase. They were in possession of a brig and were boarding a bark as Favorite approached. Foote signaled to a cutter that was in sight, which he believed was the hired armed cutter Countess of Elgin, to chase the merchant vessels, and set out after the privateers, which however separated. After three hours Favorite caught up with Raccrocheuse, which was under the command of Captain Jacques Broquant. She was armed with fourteen 4-pounder guns and had a crew of 56 men. She was one day out from Saint-Valery-en-Caux. The privateer that escaped was the Adolphe, which too carried fourteen 4-pounder guns, which however she had thrown overboard during the chase. Foote believed that she had returned to Saint-Valery-en-Caux.

In December 1804 John Davie became captain of Favourite. On 22 September 1805 she left St Helens, Isle of Wight. She arrived at Funchal Roads on 12 October, having with Arab, convoyed the slave ship Andersons and some other vessels. Favourite and Andersons left there on the 18th; they reached Gorée on 5 November, where Andersons delivered some cargo. They left on the 12th, and arrived at Bance Island on the 22nd. There Andersons would gather slaves to take on to Kingston, Jamaica.

In December 1805 Favourite was at the Îles de Los, searching for a privateer at the behest of Captain Keith Maxwell of Arab. Having received intelligence there that the privateer was at the Pongo River, to the south, Davie sailed there. Near there he spotted two vessels, which the pilot believed were the privateer's prizes. Still it took three days during which the ship's crew had to man the sweeps and boats to tow her through water that was no more than three fathoms deep to reach entrance of the river. Once there, on 28 December Favourite sighted the privateer sailing out and attempting to escape. Favourite sailed towards her and when within half-a-gunshot, fired his bow chasers at her. The privateer raked Favourite with her guns, leading Davies to reply with a broadside. The captain of the privateer "had the Temerity to continue to engaging us for Twenty Minutes" before striking.

The privateer was General Blanchard, of sixteen guns and a crew of 120 French and Spaniards. The engagement had cost her 11 men killed, including the captain, and 25 wounded. Favourite's only casualty was one man lightly wounded, a passenger, Lieutenant Odhum of the Royal African Corps. (Note: The Royal African Corps was composed of military offenders from various regiments pardoned on condition of life-service in Africa and the West Indies.)

== Capture and re-capture ==
While Favorite was sailing under Commander John Davie, L'Hermite's squadron captured her on 6 January 1806. During the night before she had been sailing off Cape Verde, towing a prize, when the watch spotted some vessels. Favourite cast off her tow and attempted to move to windward of the strangers but lost track of them. Next morning Favourite saw what appeared to be three large East Indiamen with a brig as escort, sailing towards her. As they closed, Davie realized that the strange vessels were a ship of the line, two frigates, and a sloop. He tried to sail away but eventually had to surrender when he found himself trapped between Régulus and Président. The French brought their prize into service as Favorite.

The French put Favourite's crew aboard Trio, a British slave ship they had captured before she could load any captives. They then sent Trio as a cartel back to England. Trio arrived at Falmouth on 7 April.

On 20 June 1806, Favourite reached Cayenne, where she was re-armed with Lieutenant de vaisseau Le Marant de Kerdaniel as captain. She sailed from there on Christmas Eve 1806, along with the 16-gun brig Argus. (Note: Argus had a crew of 120 men and was armed with fourteen brass 8-pounder guns, which were the equivalent of English 9-pounders.)

On 27 January 1807 the British 32-gun frigate Jason intercepted Argus and Favorite. Favorite stayed behind and battled for one hour to allow Argus to escape but was forced to strike. At the time, Favorite was armed with sixteen 6-pounder guns and thirteen 12-pounder carronades, and had a crew of 150 men. In the action she lost one man killed and one man wounded; Jason only had one man wounded. (Note: Head money for the crew of Favorite was paid in August 1817. Captain Thomas Cochrane of Jason received a first class share or £257 15s; a seaman received a fifth-class share or 16s 2½d.) Wolverine was in sight at the time of the capture but did not join the engagement. The British brought Favorite into service as HMS Goree, though it took some time for the name change to register in the West Indies, and former crew continued to refer to her as Favorite.

Favourite participated in the second British invasion of the Danish West Indies, which took place in December 1807. A British fleet captured the Danish islands of St Thomas on 22 December and Santa Cruz on 25 December. The Danes did not resist and the invasion was bloodless.

== HMS Goree ==
On 22 April 1808, Goree, under Commander Joseph Spear, engaged the French brigs Palinure and Pilade in an inconclusive action. The schooner Superieure was at anchor a few miles to the NW while refilling her water casks. When the Governor of Marie-Galante, which the British had just occupied a month earlier, informed him that Goree was engaged, Captain William Robillard immediately came to Goree's assistance. Superieure then prevented the French brigs from reaching Guadeloupe and kept up a running fight with Pilade until they reached the Saintes. A little while later the frigate Circe and the brig-sloop Wolverine arrived, but too late to engage. Goree had one man killed and the French lost eight men killed and 21 wounded. On 31 October Circe captured Palinure.

In January 1809, Goree participated in the invasion of Martinique. In 1847 the Admiralty awarded the Naval General Service Medal with clasp "Martinique" to all surviving claimants from the campaign. In October, Goree came under the command of the newly promoted Commander Henry Dilkes Byng, formerly of Bream.

From 1810 to 1813 Goree was on the Halifax station. That year Byng and Goree intercepted the schooner USS Revenge under Lieutenant Oliver Hazard Perry. Fortunately, no more dramatic incident ensued. After the Little Belt affair on 16 May 1811, Goree encountered and escorted the damaged Little Belt to Halifax. Also in 1811, Byng intercepted and took into Nassau the San Carlos, after determining from an inspection of her papers that she was "An American ship engaged in the African Slave Trade under Spanish Colours." The court in Nassau released the San Carlos back to her owners as she had no slaves aboard and the charge rested only on Byng's belief that she had forged documents.

After the start of the War of 1812, on 2 October, Goree captured the American ship Ranger, which was sailing from the Pacific to Nantucket with a valuable cargo. In March 1813 Goree became a prison hulk and Byng transferred to Mohawk.

Goree moved to Bermuda. There on 24 April 1814 eleven American prisoners of war overpowered their guards and escaped while having been taken ashore to gather water. They boarded the schooner HMS Bermuda, overpowered the five men aboard her, and sailed her to Cape May, New Jersey, where they ran her aground and escaped.

From July 1814 Goree was under Commander Constantine Richard Moorsom. Goree shared with Euryalus in a grant of £3988 19s 9d for the capture of the ship St. Nicolay on 30 November 1814.

Lieutenant Edward Stone Cottgrave became acting commander in April 1815. Lieutenant John Boulton replaced him in June 1815, only to have Commander John Wilson replace him in turn within the month.

== Fate ==
Goree was broken up in Bermuda in 1817.
