= Cartel (ship) =

Ship employed on humanitarian missions

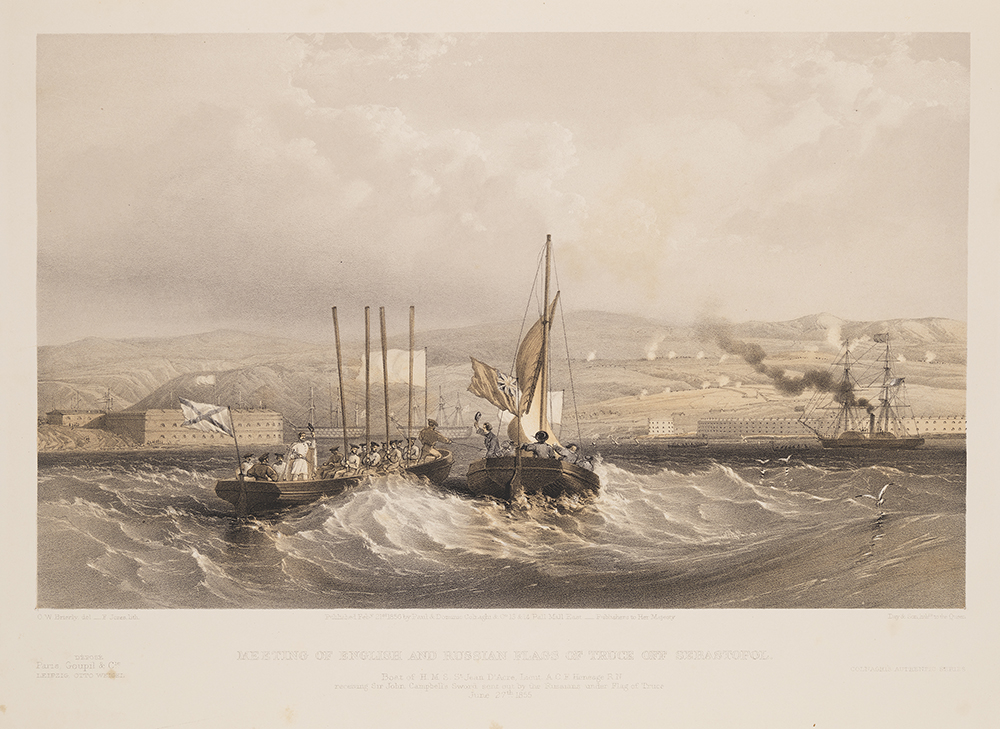
A Russian and British cartel meeting on 27 June 1855, to transfer the sword of Sir John Campbell, who was killed in 1855, at the Battle of the Great Redan

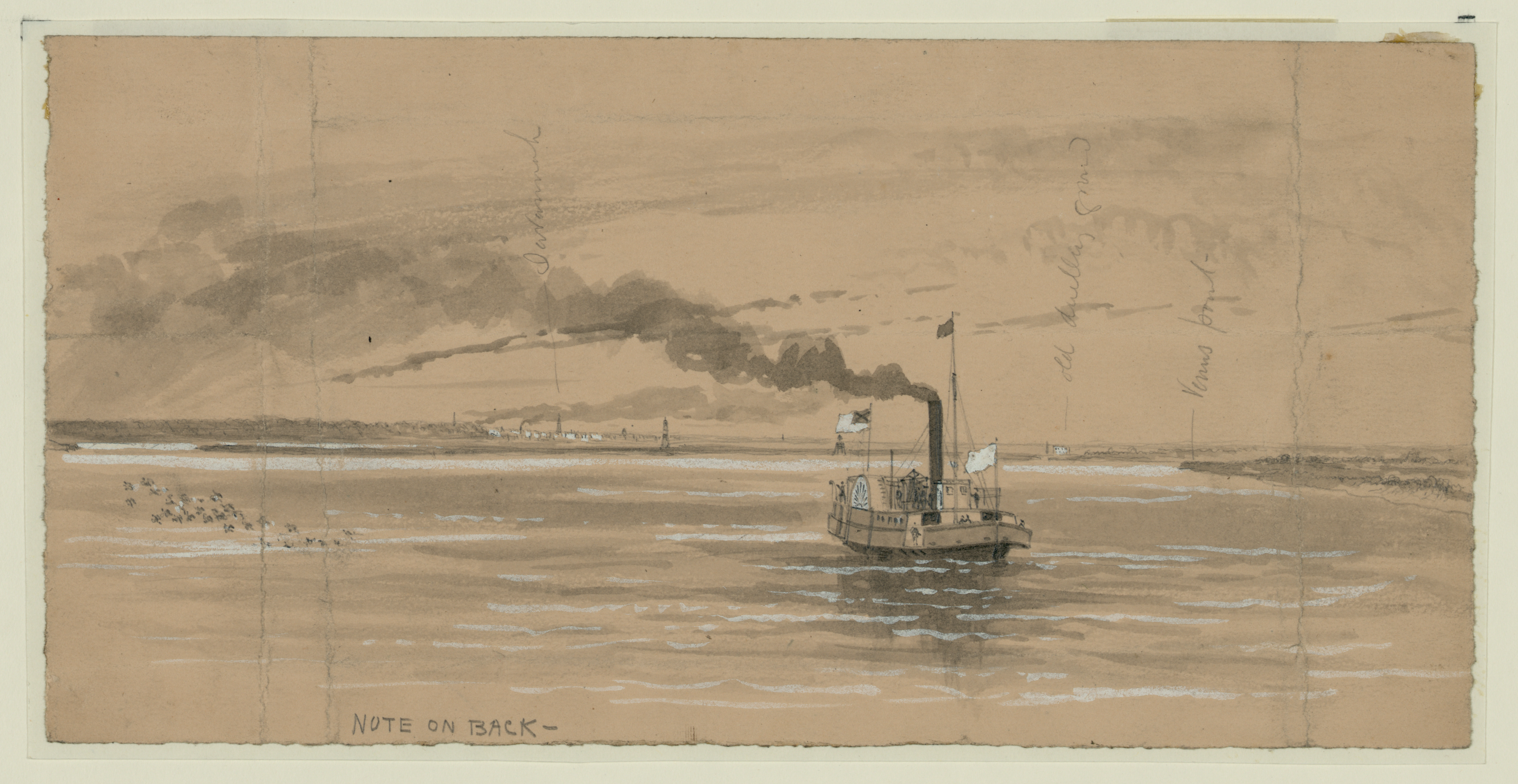
The Confederate cartel Beauregard steaming in the Savannah River to collect prisoners, 1861

Cartels, in international law, are ships employed for humanitarian voyages between belligerents, most commonly (but not exclusively) the repatriation of prisoners. They fly distinctive flags, including a flag of truce. Traditionally, they were unarmed but for a single gun retained for signalling purposes. Cartel ships were used on the basis of intergovernmental agreements, which were called 'cartels' between the 17th and the 19th centuries.

A ship serving as a cartel was not subject to seizure or capture, unless it violated the agreement by engaging in commerce or warlike acts such as carrying official dispatches or messengers for one party. In exchange for repatriation, the prisoners and their government agreed to give safe passage and not to challenge the ownership of the cartel ship (often a prize ship). Thus, the prisoners being taken for exchange agreed not to attempt to overpower the prize crew, and it was allowed free passage into and out of its destination port (including past any blockade). The cartel protection extended to the return voyage. If the ship were seized, the captor would have no rights to salvage, and the former owner of the vessel, if it were a ship from their country, would have no right to reclaim the vessel.

During the War of 1812, the British and American governments entered into a cartel agreement for the exchange of prisoners, however the British Admiralty wrote to the United States Government that Great Britain would not accept as valid other cartel agreements made on the high seas. On 10 June 1813, USS President captured the outward-bound Falmouth packet Duke of Montrose, which managed to throw her mails overboard before President could send a prize crew aboard. President made a cartel agreement with Duke of Montrose's Captain Aaron Groub Blewett, adding prisoners from two earlier captures and then sending her and her now 79 passengers and crew into Falmouth under the command of an American officer. There the British government refused to recognize the cartel agreement that Blewett, his crew, and passengers had signed. Rather than turn Duke of Montrose over to the Agent for American Prisoners, the British government instructed Blewett to resume command of his ship and prepare her to sail again.

The last known modern day use of the title "cartel ship" occurred during the 1982 Falklands War, when the British P&O cruise liner SS Canberra (known colloquially as "The Great White Whale") ferried 4,000 Argentinian prisoners of war from East Falkland to Puerto Madryn, Argentina after the cessation of hostilities. It was appointed a cartel ship by the Red Cross representative Hugo Berchtold, then present in the islands.
