= Canning (disambiguation) =

Canning is a method of preserving food in which the food contents are processed and sealed in an airtight container.

Canning may also refer to:

== Places ==
=== Argentina ===
- Canning, Buenos Aires, a district of Esteban Echeverría Partido, in Argentina
- Canning Station, the former name of Scalabrini Ortiz (Buenos Aires Underground)

=== Australia ===
- Canning Basin, a geological basin in Western Australia
- Canning Bridge, a crossing of Canning River, Western Australia
- Canning Highway, a major arterial road in Perth, Western Australia
- Canning River (Western Australia), flowing through Perth
- Canning Stock Route, a track from Halls Creek to Wiluna in Western Australia
- Canning Vale, Western Australia, a suburb of Perth
- City of Canning, a local government area in Western Australia based in Cannington
- Division of Canning, an Australian federal electoral division in southern Perth

=== England ===
- Canning, Liverpool
- Canning Dock, on the River Mersey and part of the Port of Liverpool
- Canning Town, part of east London
- Canning Town station, a transport interchange in Canning Town

=== India ===
- Canning, South 24 Parganas, a town in South 24 Parganas district in the state of West Bengal
- Canning I, Community development block in West Bengal, India
- Canning II, Community development block in West Bengal, India
- Canning subdivision, an administrative subdivision of South 24 Paraganas district in the state of West Bengal

=== United States ===
- Canning, South Dakota, an unincorporated community
- Canning Creek, a river in Kansas
- Canning River (Alaska), United States

=== Canada ===
- Canning Parish, New Brunswick, in Queens County
- Canning, Nova Scotia, a village in Canada

=== Other ===
- Canning (state constituency), Malaysia

== See also ==
- Fort Canning Hill, a hill in Singapore
- Canner (disambiguation)
