= Canner =

Canner may refer to:

- Canner (appliance), a device used in home canning
- Canner (occupation), a person who works at a cannery
- Canner (recycling), a person who scavenges for cans to redeem for money
- Canner (surname), an English surname

== See also ==
- Canned (disambiguation)
- Canning (disambiguation)
