= Province House (Nova Scotia) =

Nova Scotian legislative assembly building, Canada

Coordinates: 44.64791°N 63.573396°W

- Taigh na Roinne
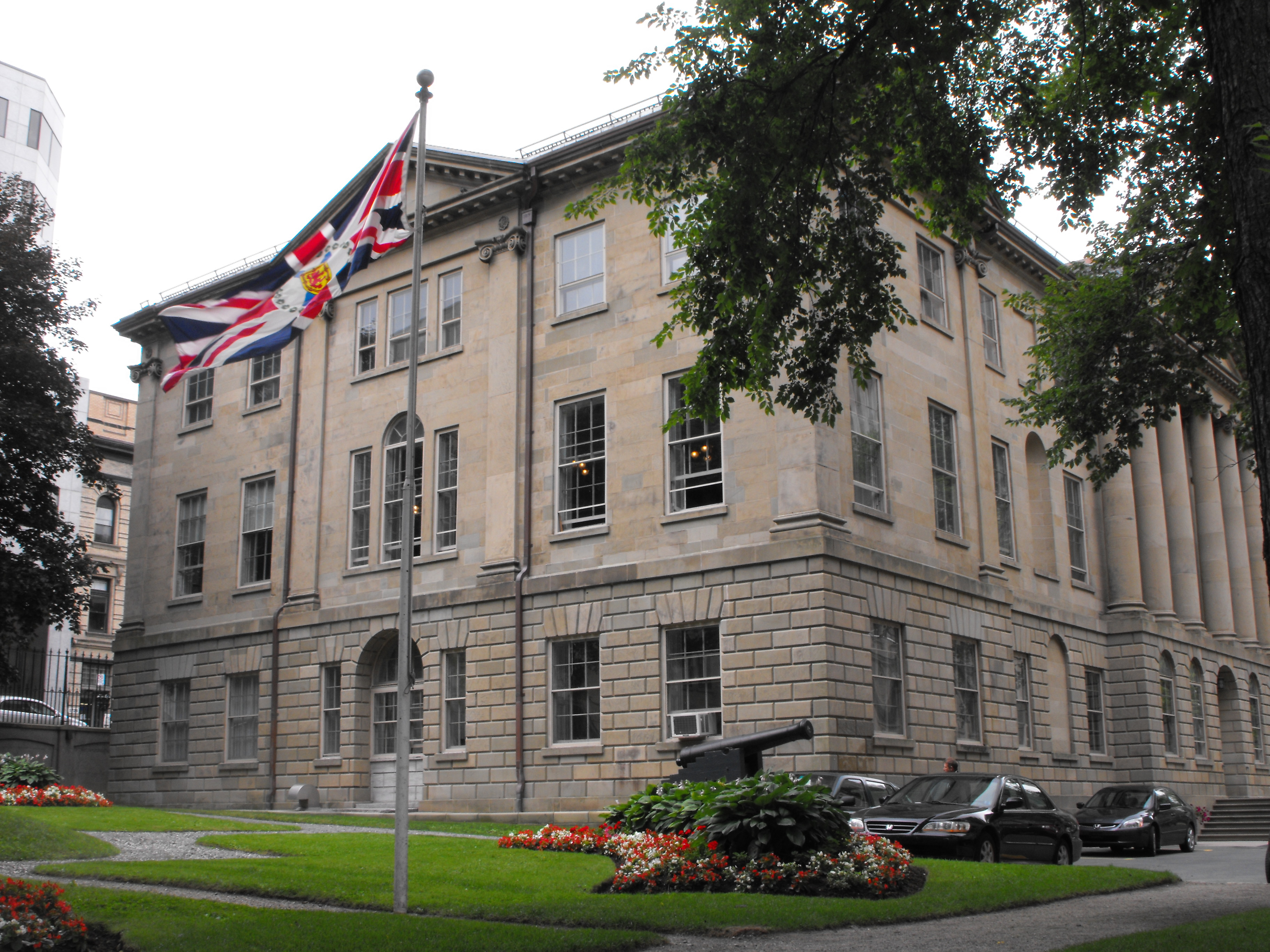
- Interactive map of the Province House area

General information
- Architectural style: Palladian
- Location: Halifax, Nova Scotia, Canada
- Construction started: 1811; 215 years ago
- Opened: 1819; 207 years ago

Design and construction
- Architect: John Merrick

National Historic Site of Canada
- Official name: Province House National Historic Site of Canada
- Designated: 1993

Nova Scotia Heritage Property Act
- Type: Provincially Registered Property
- Designated: 1983

Province House (Scottish Gaelic: Taigh na Roinne) in Halifax is where the Nova Scotia legislative assembly, known officially as the Nova Scotia House of Assembly, has met every year since 1819, making it the longest serving legislative building in Canada. The building is Canada's oldest house of government. Standing three storeys tall, the structure is considered one of the finest examples of Palladian architecture in North America.

== History ==
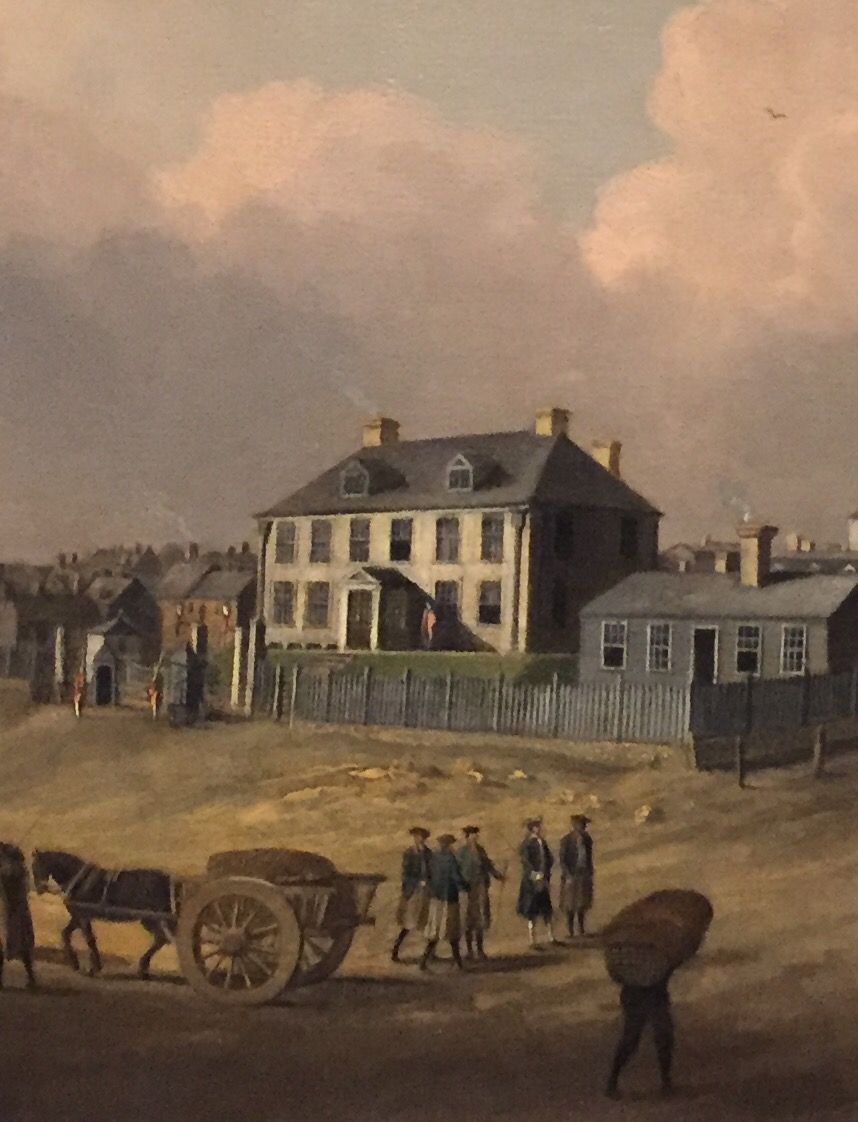
Governor's House, built 1749 on the site of Province House

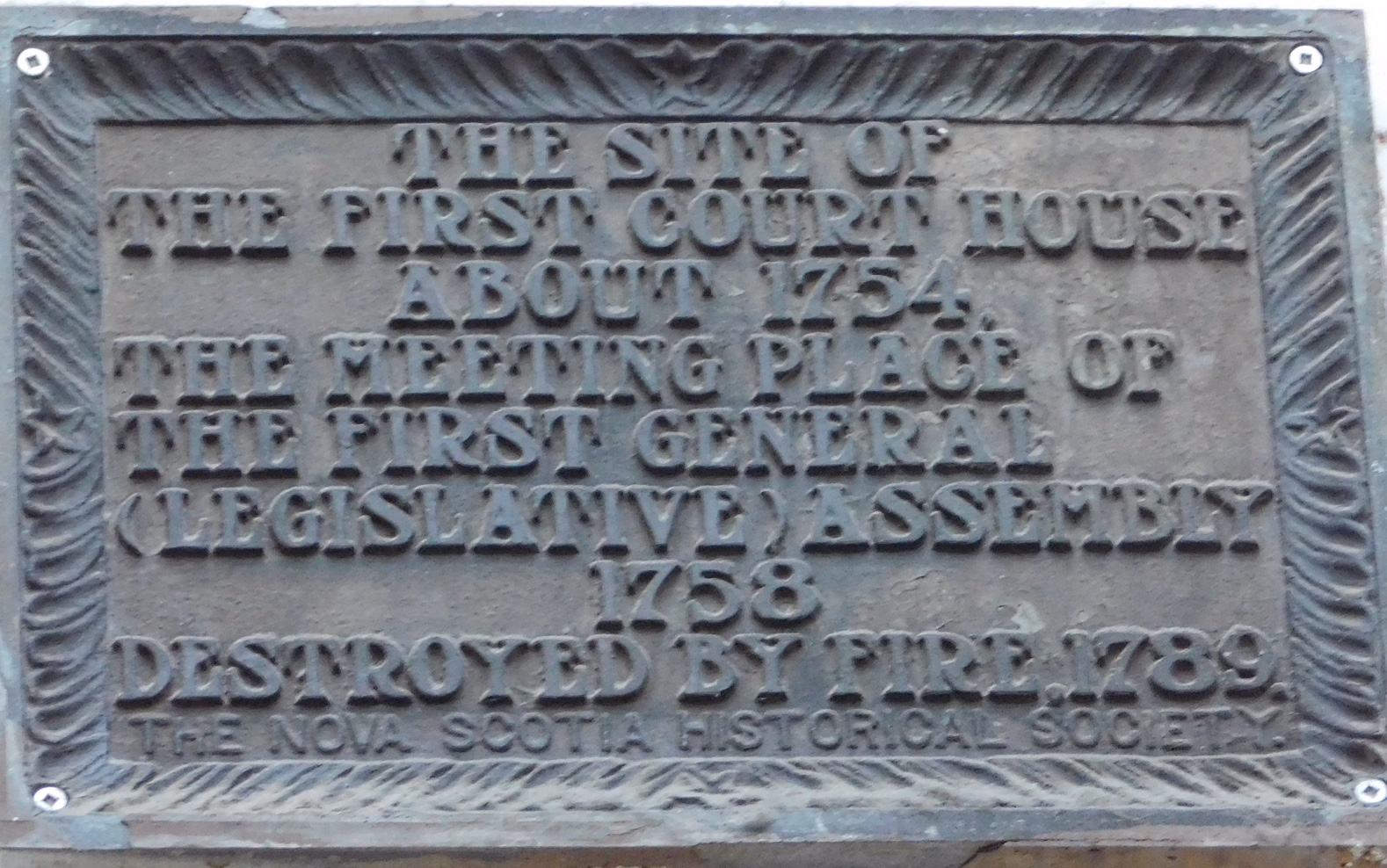
Site of First Legislative Assembly Plaque, Royal Nova Scotia Historical Society, Scotia Square, Halifax, Nova Scotia.

Province House was built on the same location as the previous Governor's House, erected by Edward Cornwallis in 1749. (Cornwallis' table remains in the bedroom of Province House.) Province House was opened for the first time on February 11, 1819. One of the smallest functioning legislatures in North America, Province House originally housed the executive, legislative and judicial functions of the colony, all in one building.

The Supreme Court of Nova Scotia held its sessions in Province House (in what is today the legislative library). Most notably, Joseph Howe, a journalist and later Premier of Nova Scotia, was put on trial on a charge of criminal libel on March 2, 1835, at Province House. Howe had published an anonymous letter accusing Halifax politicians and police of pocketing £30,000 over a thirty-year period, and outraged civic politicians had subsequently seen to it that Howe was charged with seditious libel. The presiding judge called for Howe's conviction, but Howe's passionate speech in his own defence swayed the jury and the jurors acquitted him in what is considered a landmark case in the struggle for a free press in Canada.

On January 20, 1842, English author Charles Dickens attended the opening of the Nova Scotia Legislature. He said that it was like looking at Westminster through the wrong end of a telescope.

During 1848, Province House was the site for the first form of responsible government in the British Empire outside the United Kingdom. The building is located in downtown Halifax on a block bordered by Hollis, Granville, George and Prince streets.

Led by the efforts of Joseph Howe, the Anti-Confederation Party won a resounding majority in the first election held after Nova Scotia joined the Confederation of Canada on July 1, 1867.

Province House was designated a National Historic Site of Canada in 1996, in recognition of its status as the longest serving legislative building in Canada, and the role it played in the development of responsible government and freedom of the press in the country. It is also a Provincially Registered Property under provincial heritage legislation.

== Legislative Assembly ==
Province House is the home of the House of Assembly, Nova Scotia's elected legislative assembly. In 1908 and 2008, there were significant official celebrations in Nova Scotia and Canada to mark the 150th and 250th anniversary of the birth of parliamentary democracy (i.e., representative government) in Canada, which started in Nova Scotia. The first event was marked by the creation of the Dingle Tower and the second by a year-long celebration the birth of parliamentary democracy in Canada. The celebration was entitled Democracy 250.

On October 2, 1758, the Nova Scotia House of Assembly met for the first time in a modest wooden building at the corner of Argyle and Buckingham streets in Halifax. It was an assembly of twenty-two men, who came together to deliberate as a parliament on questions affecting the colony. With voting limited to Protestant, free-land holding males, it was a modest beginning, and their influence with the British-appointed governor was questionable. It was the first elected assembly of its kind in what eventually became Canada.

On January 31, 1837, Simon d'Entremont and Frederick A. Robicheau became the first Acadians elected to the House of Assembly (Joseph Winniett, whose mother was Acadian, was elected to the assembly in 1761). (Two months later, on March 24, 1837, black men in Canada were given the right to vote.) in 1893, Edith Archibald and others made the first official attempt to have a suffrage bill for women property holders passed in Nova Scotia, which was passed by the legislature but quashed by Attorney General James Wilberforce Longley (who opposed unions and female emancipation for the twenty years he was in office).

On April 26, 1918, as a result of the Local Council of Women of Halifax (LCWH), the House of Assembly passed The Nova Scotia Franchise Act, which gave women the right to vote in Nova Scotia's provincial elections, the first province to do so in Atlantic Canada. (A month later Nova Scotian and Prime Minister of Canada Robert Borden – whose wife Laura Bond was former president of the LCWH – used his majority to pass women's suffrage for the whole country.) Almost forty-three years later, on February 1, 1961, Gladys Porter was the first woman elected to the assembly. In 1993, Wayne Adams was elected as the first Black member of the assembly. The Nova Scotia legislature was the third in Canada to pass human rights legislation (1963).

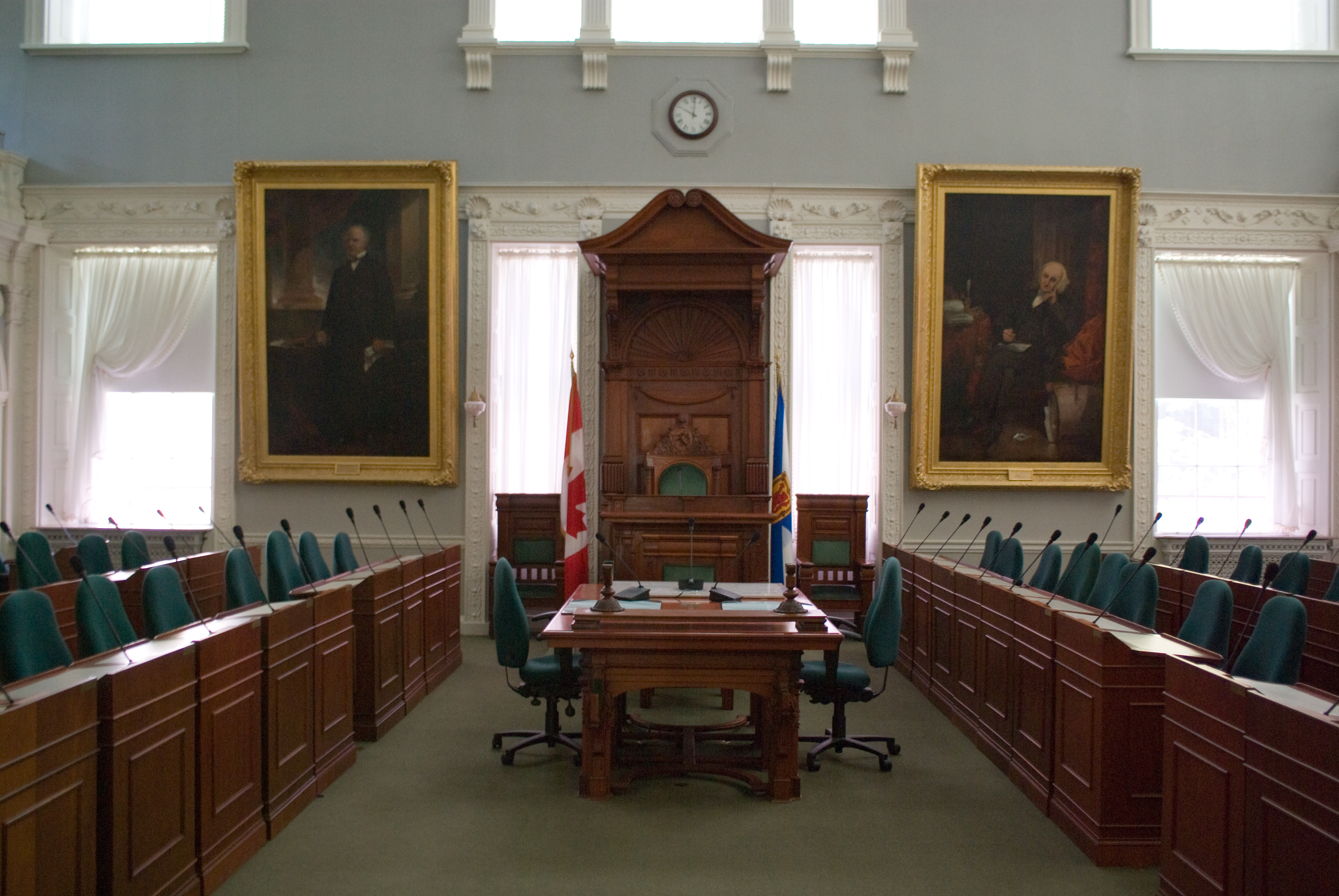
House of Assembly, Joseph Howe (left) and James William Johnston (right), both paintings by Henry Sandham

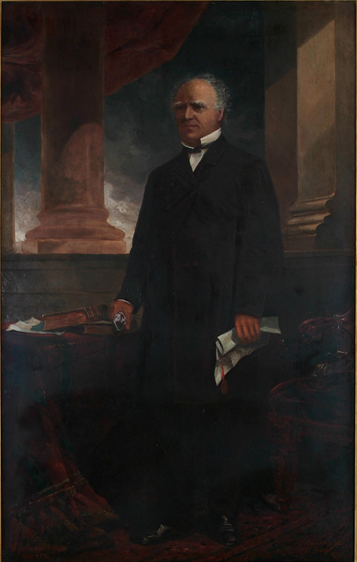
Joseph Howe by Henry Sandham

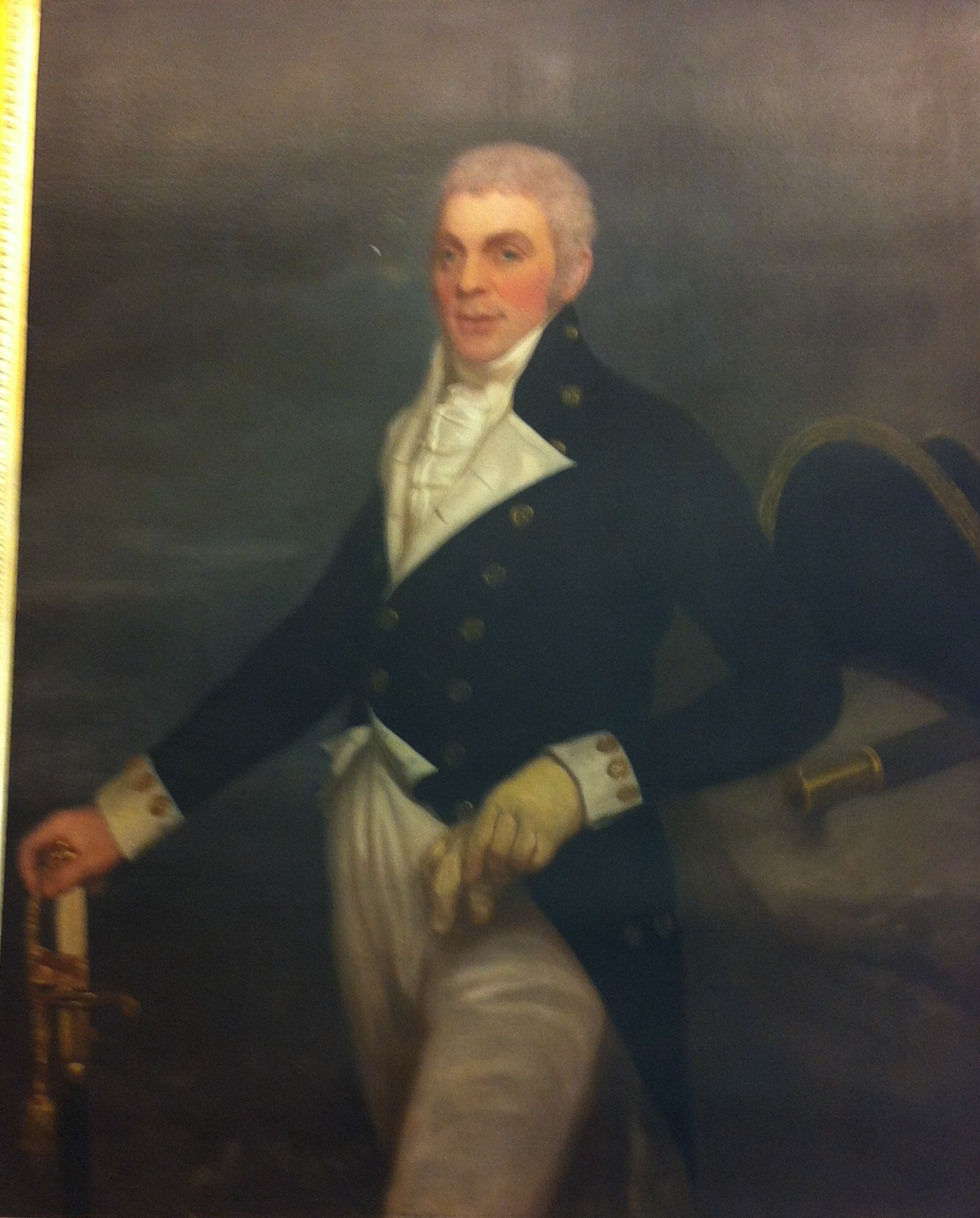
Commander John Houlton Marshall by unknown artist

== The Library (former Supreme Court) ==
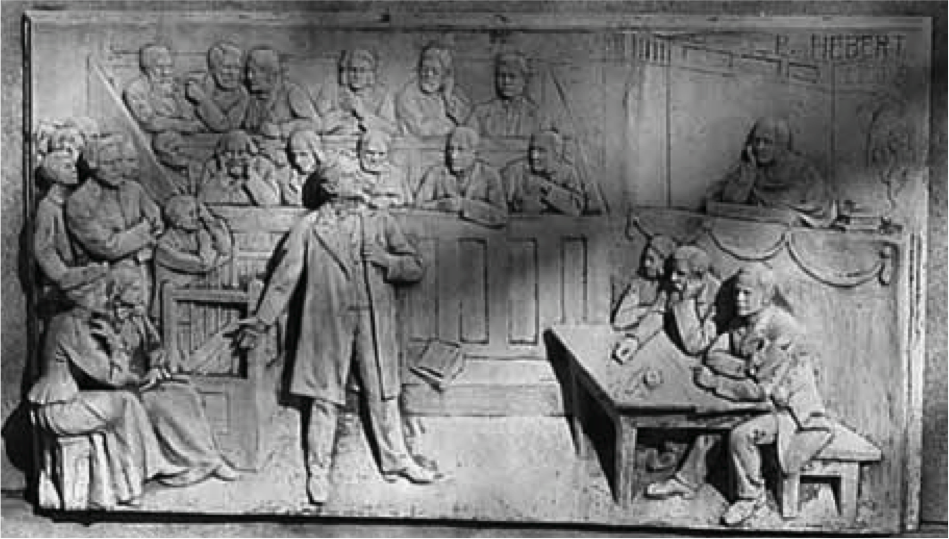
Libel trial of Joseph Howe, Supreme Court (base of Joseph Howe Statue, Court Yard)

The Legislative Library, located on the second floor between the Red Chamber and Legislative Assembly, was originally the home of the Supreme Court of Nova Scotia, until the court outgrew the space. The first important trial in the court was against Richard John Uniacke Jr. for killing William Bowie in the last lethal duel in Nova Scotia (1819).

The Supreme Court chamber was the site of Joseph Howe's 1835 trial for seditious libel. On March 2, 1835, newspaper editor Joseph Howe defended himself at trial in the present-day library for seditious libel by civic politicians in Nova Scotia. Many scholars consider Howe's success in this case a landmark event in the evolution of press freedom in Canada.

== The Red Chamber ==
The Red Chamber was formerly the meeting place of the Nova Scotia Council and later the Legislative Council, the upper house of Nova Scotia's legislature. The Legislative Council was appointed by the governor and was abolished in 1928. Now the room is used for receptions and other meetings.

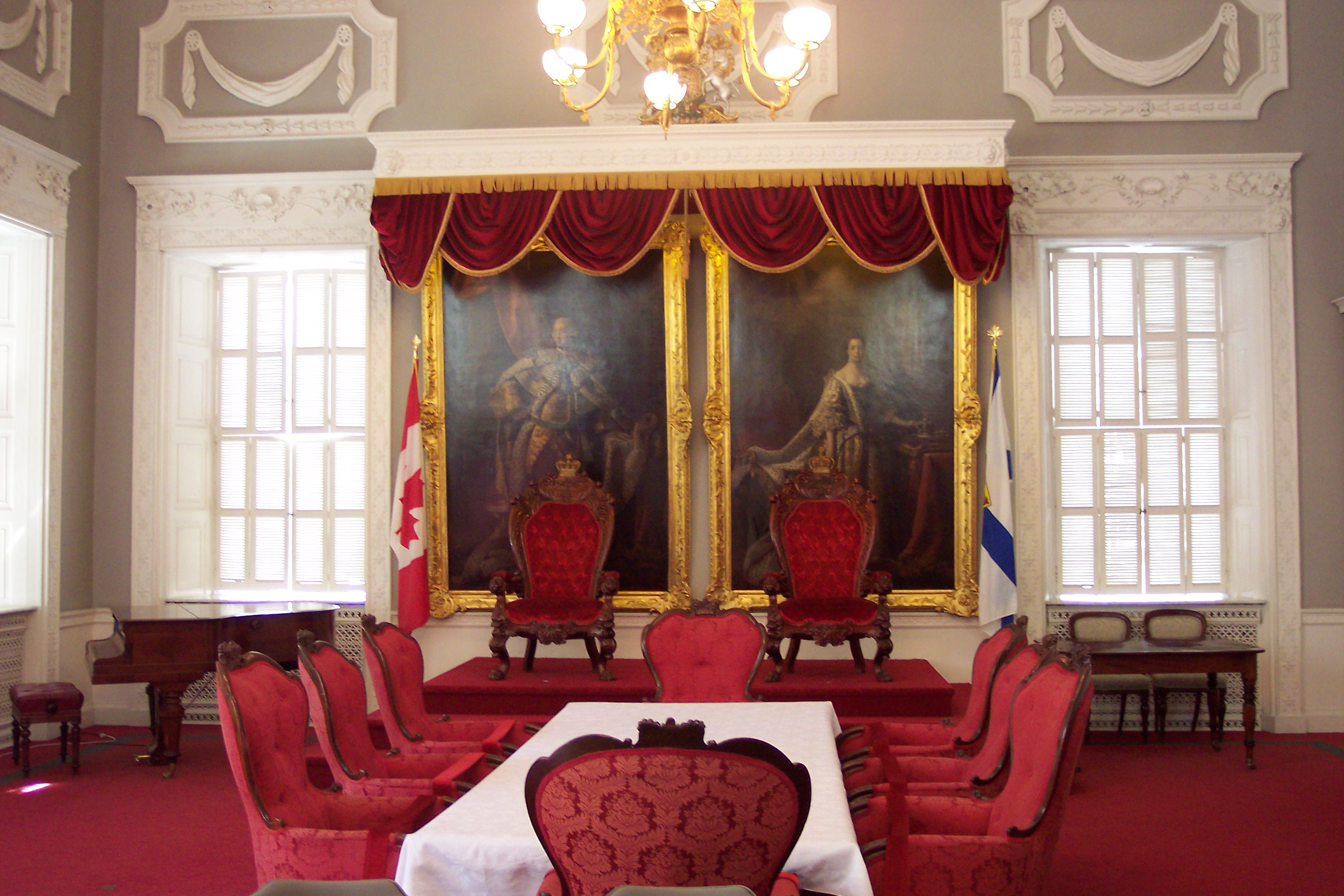
Table used by Edward Cornwallis on the ship Beaufort to hold his first Nova Scotia Council meeting, The Red Chamber (1749)

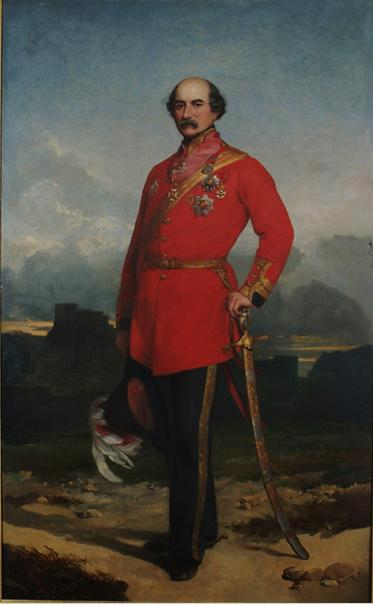
Nova Scotian Sir William Williams, 1st Baronet, of Kars with sword from Nova Scotia House of Assembly by William Gush (sword is displayed at University of King's College Library, Halifax)

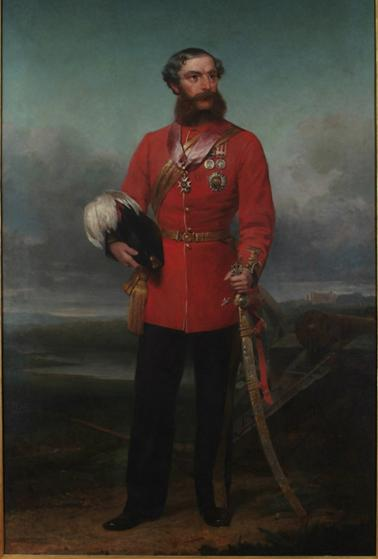
Nova Scotian Sir John Eardley Inglis with sword from Nova Scotia House of Assembly by William Gush (sword is displayed at University of King's College Library, Halifax)

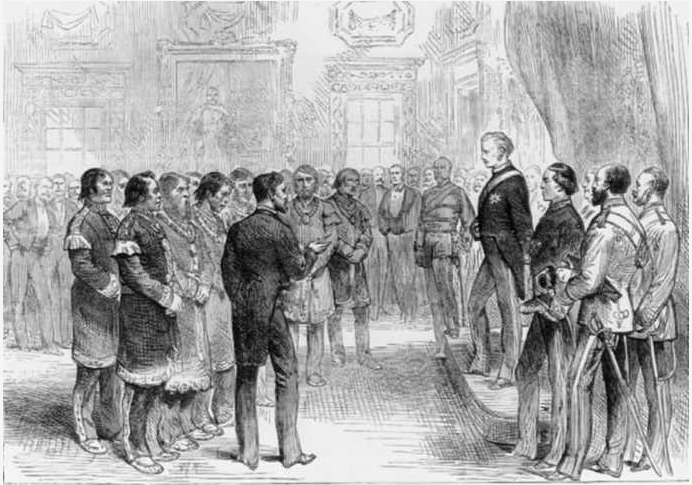
Grand Chief Jacques-Pierre Peminuit Paul (3rd from left with beard) meets Governor General of Canada, Marquess of Lorne, Red Chamber, 1879

== Court Yard ==
Province House is flanked with two prominent statues. To the north of Province House is the South African War Memorial by Hamilton MacCarthy to the Second Boer War. (MacCarthy also made the South African War Monument in the Halifax Public Gardens and the statue to Harold Lothrop Borden.) On one of the panels is a sculpture of the Battle of Witpoort, made famous by the death of Nova Scotian Harold Lothrop Borden. To the south of Province House is a statue to the Honourable Joseph Howe, created by famed Quebec sculptor Louis-Philippe Hébert.

On the north side of Province House is a cannon from HMS Shannon, and on the south side is a cannon of USS Chesapeake which was captured in the War of 1812, .

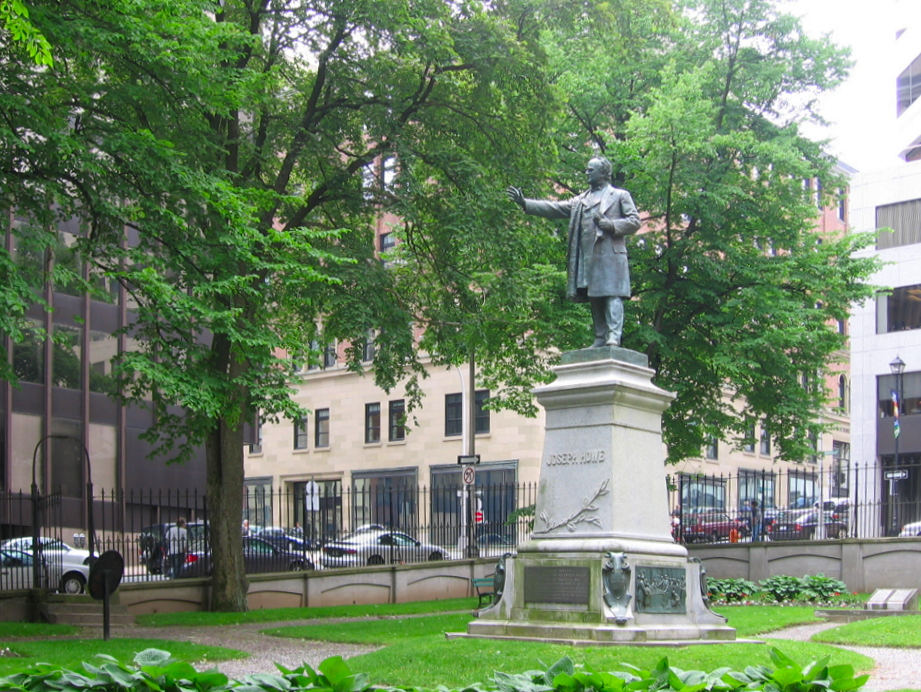
Joseph Howe by Louis-Philippe Hébert

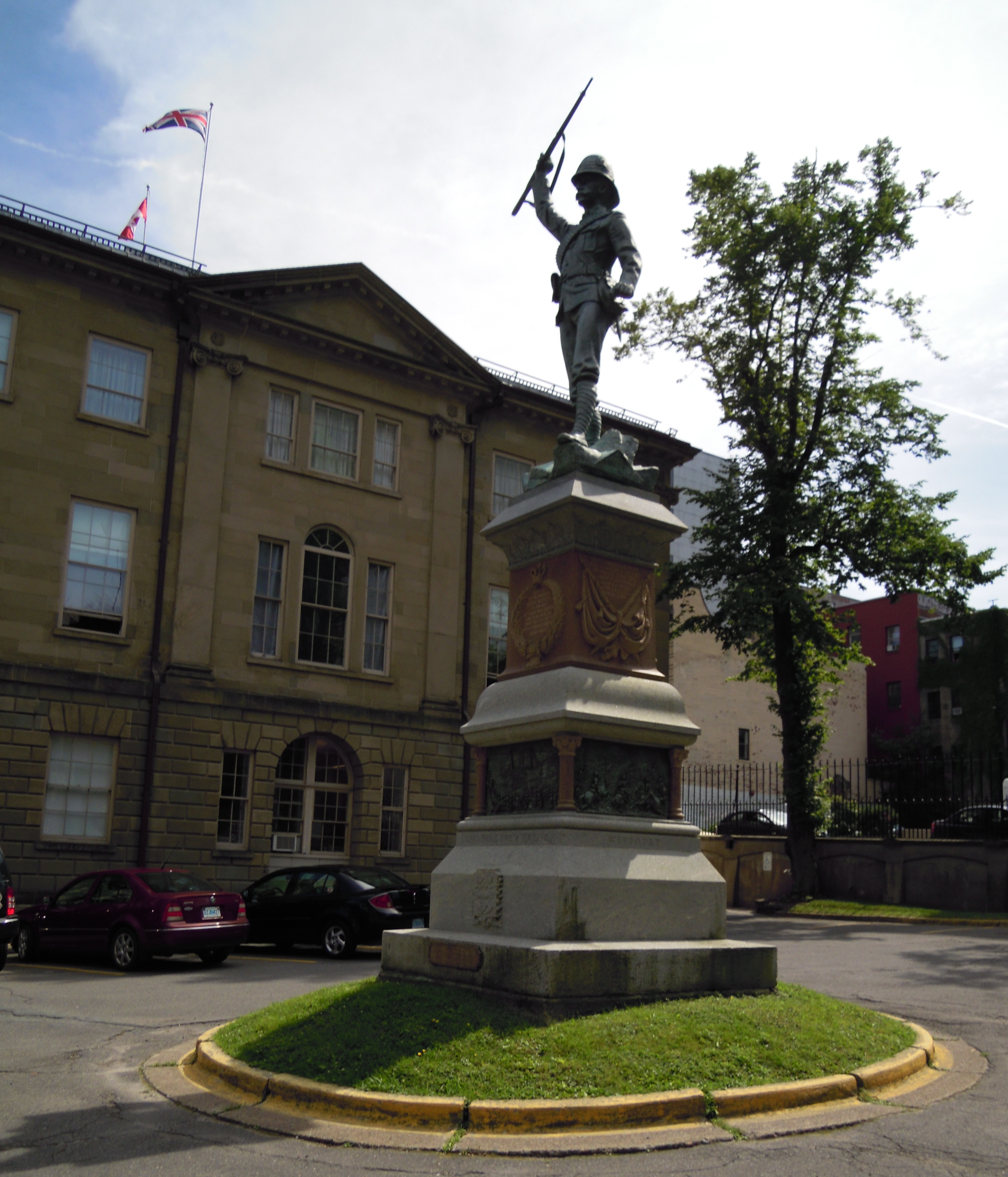
South African War Memorial by Hamilton MacCarthy

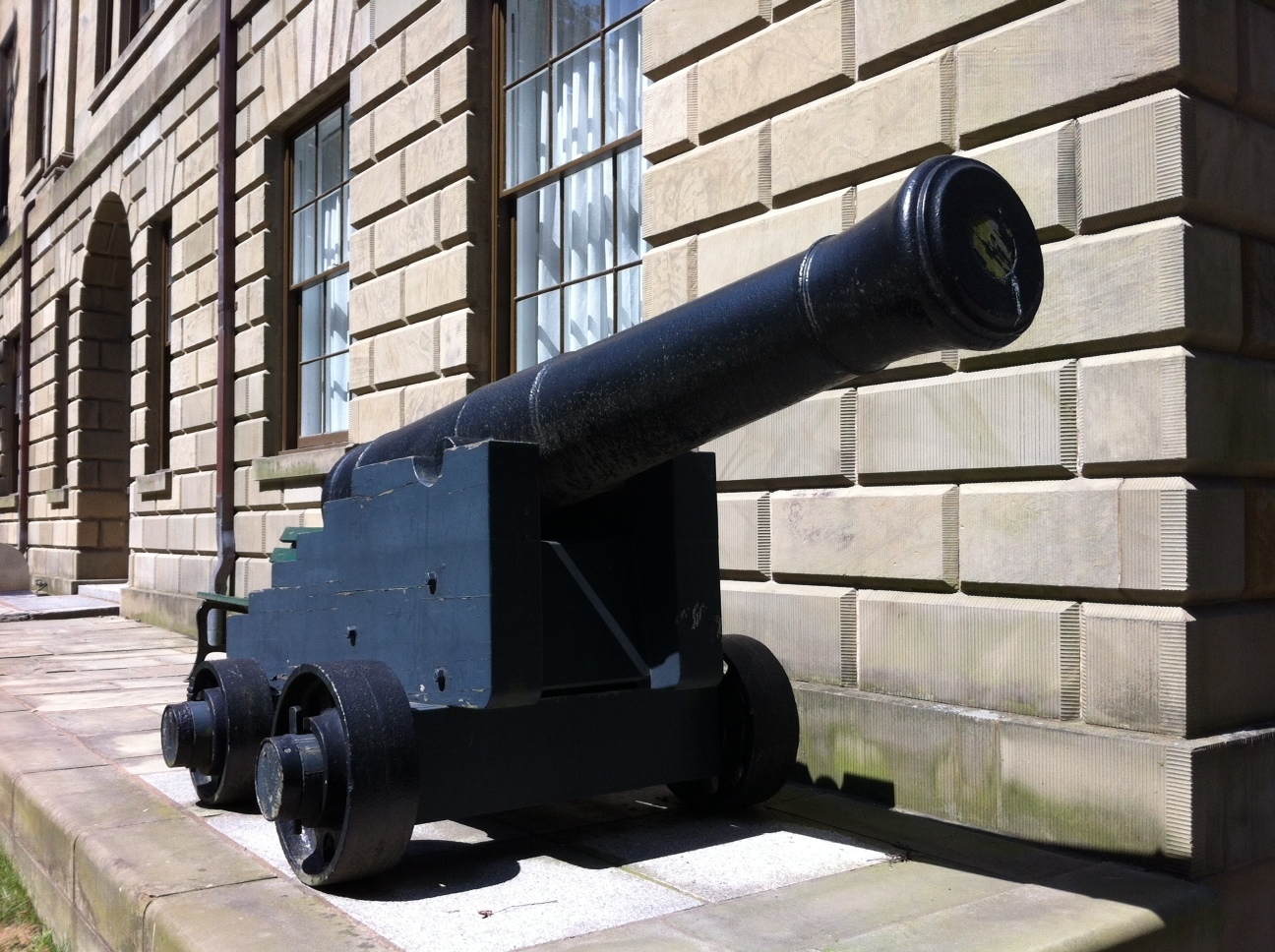
Cannon from USS Chesapeake

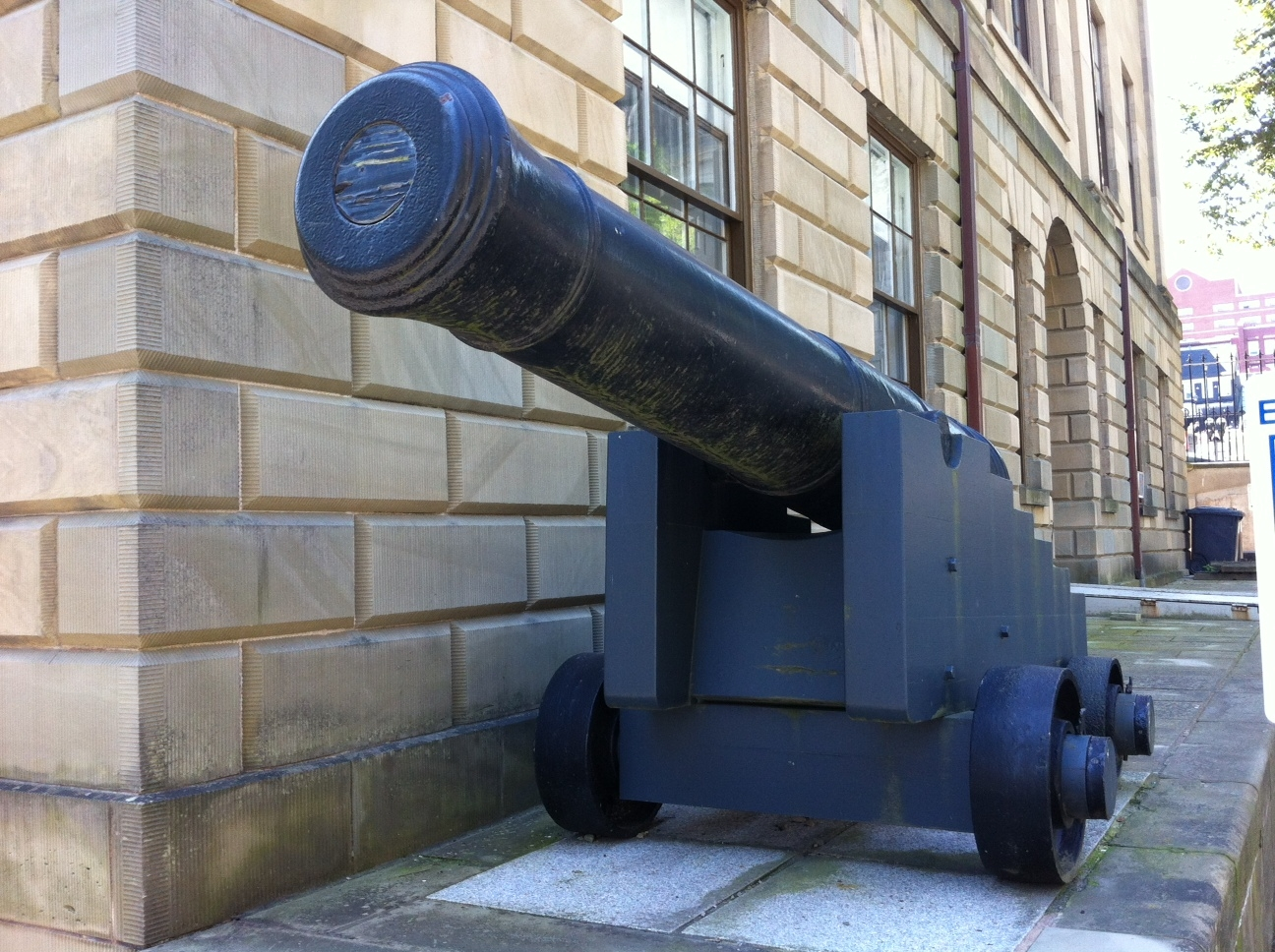
Cannon from HMS Shannon

== Other art work ==
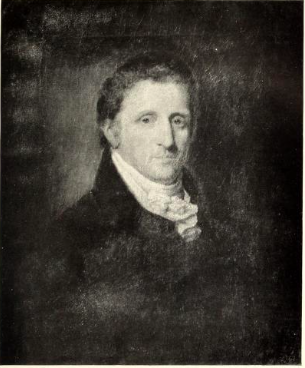
John Merrick by Robert Field

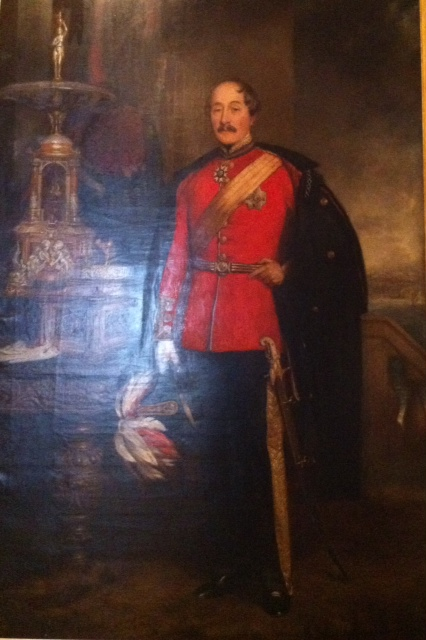
Lt Gov of Nova Scotia Charles Hastings Doyle by Adolphus Robert Venables (Rooert)

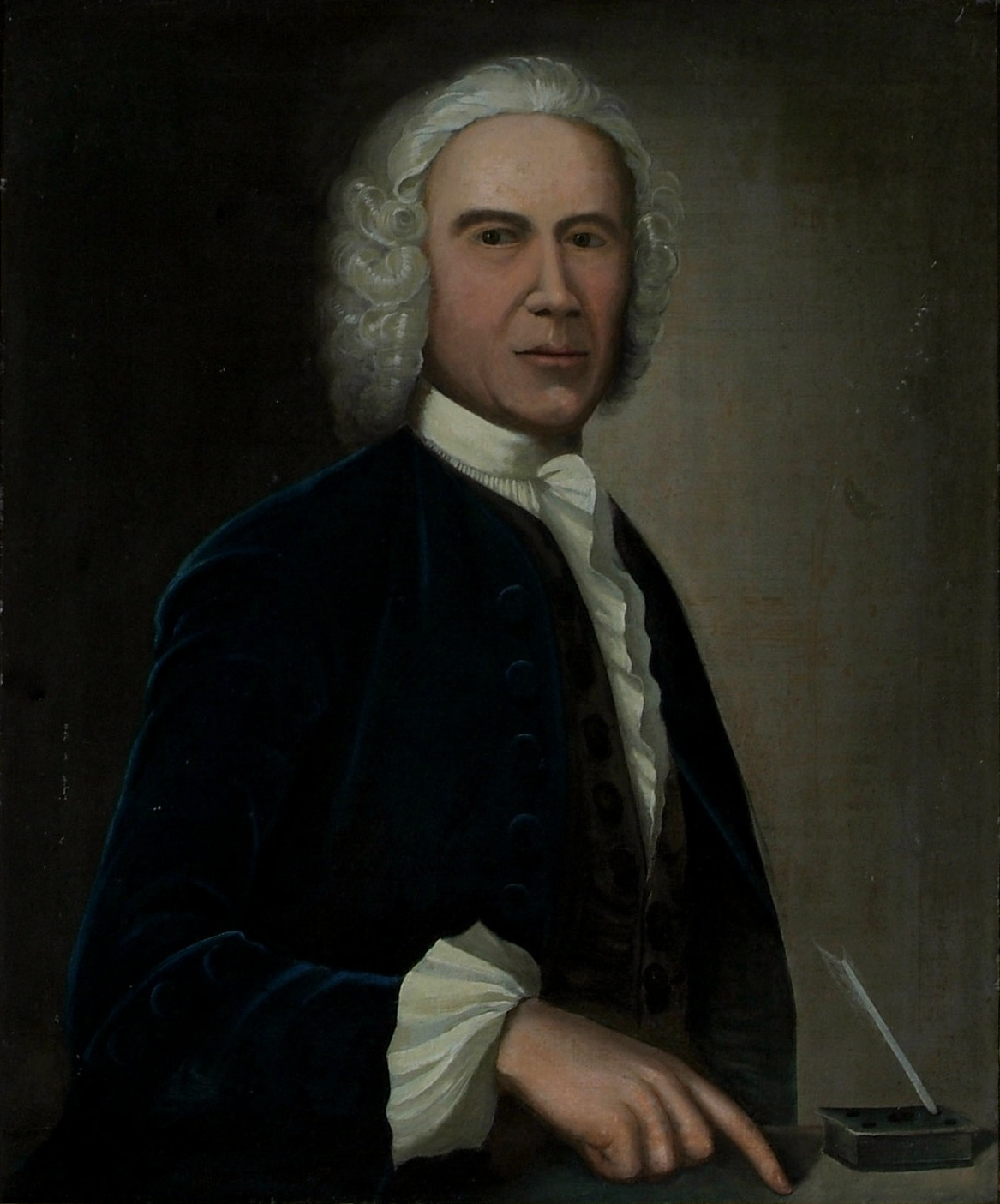
Malachy Salter by John Smybert

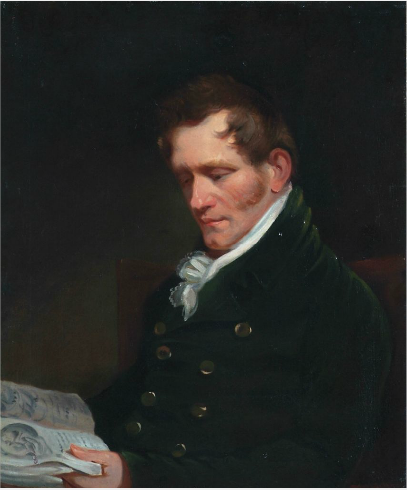
Dr. Matthias Hoffman by John Hoppner

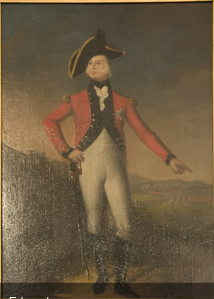
Prince Edward, Duke of Kent and Strathearn, by William J. Weaver. The Prince is wearing the star voted to him by the Nova Scotia Assembly in 1798.

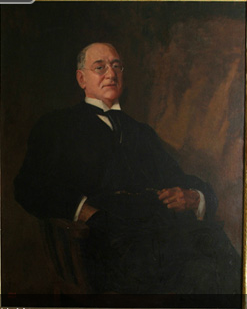
Longest serving premier George Henry Murray by Edmund Wyly Grier

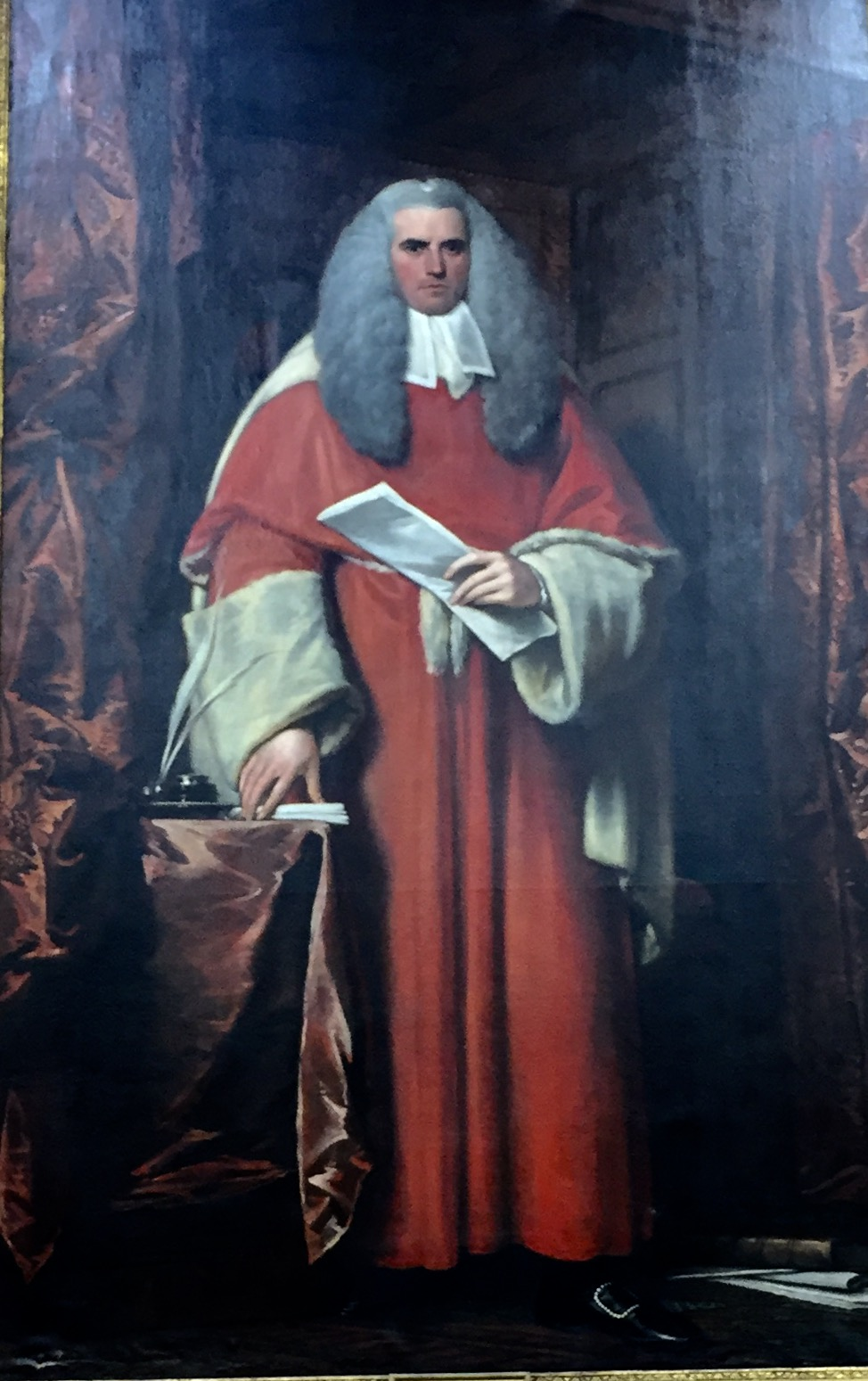
Thomas Andrew Lumisden Strange by Benjamin West

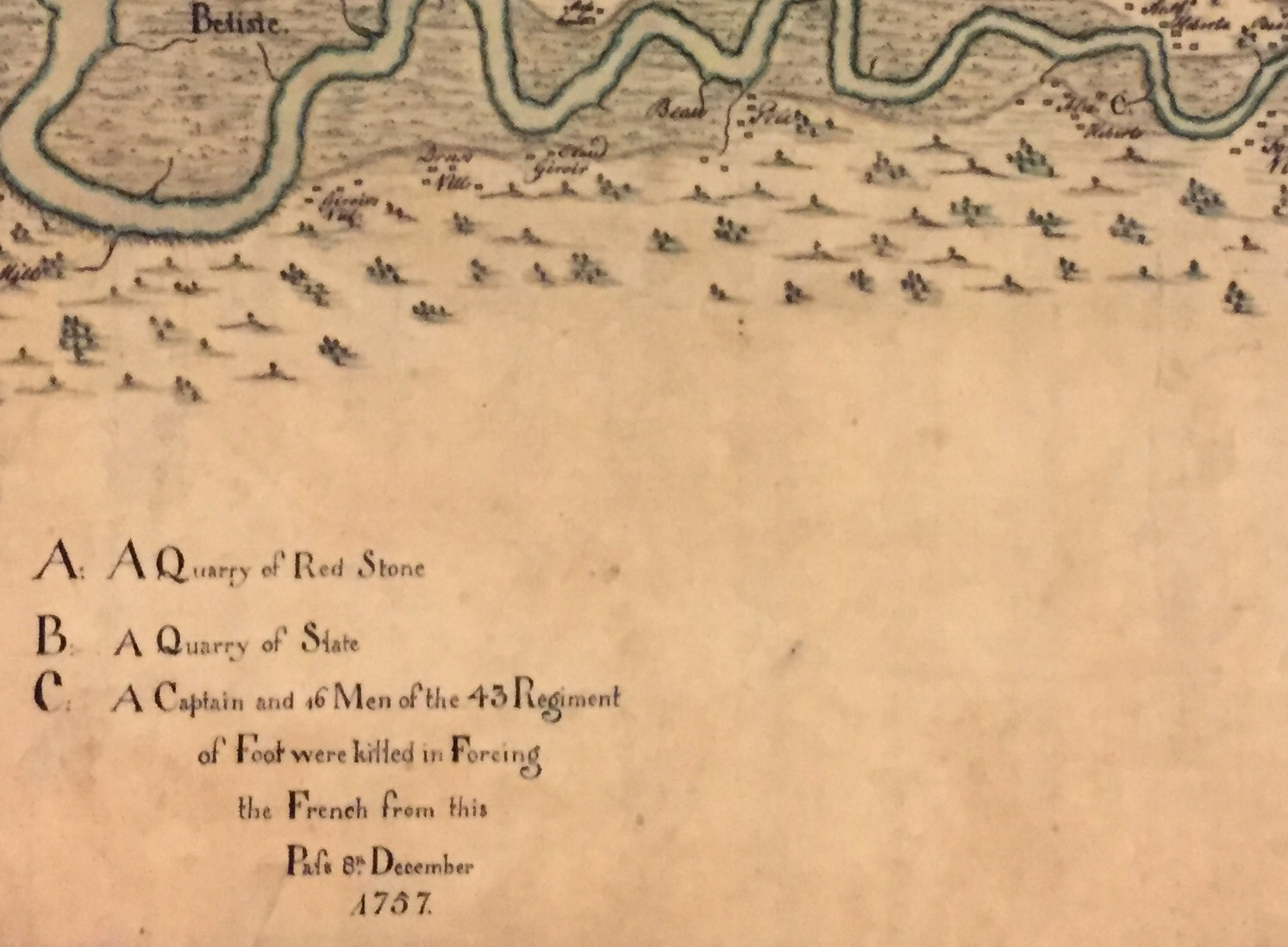
The letter "C" at the top right marks the location of Battle of Bloody Creek, Annapolis River map c. 1759.

=== Canadian Prime Ministers from Nova Scotia ===
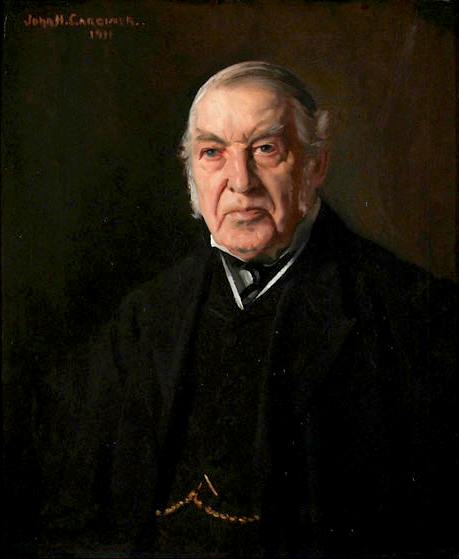
Charles Tupper by John H. Gardiner

There are also portraits of former prime ministers John Sparrow David Thompson by Thomas Forrestall and Sir Robert Borden by Walter H. Cox.

== See also ==
- List of oldest buildings and structures in Halifax, Nova Scotia
- Politics of Nova Scotia
- Nova Scotia House of Assembly
- List of Nova Scotia general elections
- List of Nova Scotia Premiers
- Monarchy in Nova Scotia
- History of Nova Scotia

== Other readings ==
- Thomas Atkins. Papers related to the first establishment of a Representative Assembly in Nova Scotia (1755-1761), Vol. 5
