= Kanfer =

Kanfer is a surname. Notable people with the surname include:

- Michael Kanfer, American visual effects artist
- Ruth Kanfer (born 1955), American psychologist and professor
- Stefan Kanfer (1933–2018), American journalist, critic, editor, and author

== See also ==
- Kanner
- Kanter
