= South African War Memorial (Halifax) =

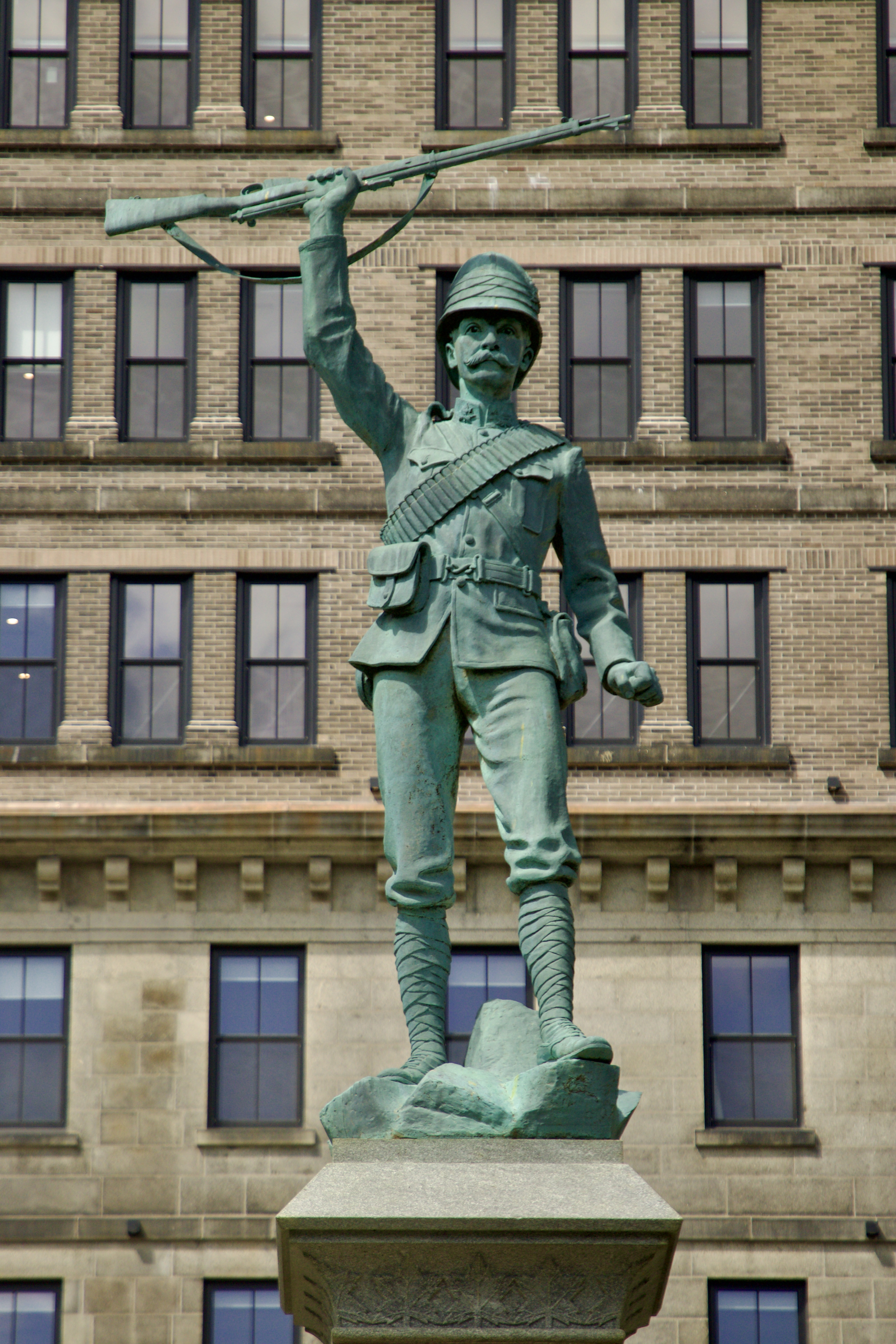
- Boer War Monument, Province House
- Interactive map of South African War Memorial
- Location: Halifax, Nova Scotia, Canada
- Coordinates: 44°38′53.86″N 063°34′24.65″W
- Designer: Hamilton MacCarthy
- Type: War memorial
- Opening date: 1901
- Dedicated to: Those who fought in the Boer War

The South African War Memorial is a memorial located in the courtyard of Province House in Halifax, Nova Scotia, Canada.

== History ==
On October 19, 1901, the Prince of Wales (the future George V) laid the cornerstone for the monument. (This was the first visit to Canada by a Prince and Princess of Wales.) The Prince also gave medals to returning soldiers. Two weeks later, on November 1, the heroes of Paardeberg returned and marched triumphantly down George Street.

The statue was made by Hamilton MacCarthy (who also made the Boer War Monument in the Halifax Public Gardens and the Harold Lothrop Borden statue in Canning). At the base of the statue are four panels. One panel is of the departure of troops from Halifax en route to South Africa; another is the Battle of Witpoort, which made Harold Lothrop Borden the most famous Canadian casualty of the war; another depicts the Battle of Paardeberg (Canada's most significant battle of the war, with the most casualties); and the fourth panel is of the Siege of Mafeking. These panels were also meant to honour the three Canadian Services that fought in the war: the infantry, mounted rifles and artillery. The Princess Louise Fusiliers of Nova Scotia and the Nova Scotia Highlanders participated in the war.

For two decades afterwards, Canadians would gather on February 27 (known in Canada as "Paardeberg Day") around memorials to the South African War to say prayers and honour veterans. This continued until the end of the First World War, when Armistice Day (later called Remembrance Day) began to observed on November 11.

== Gallery ==
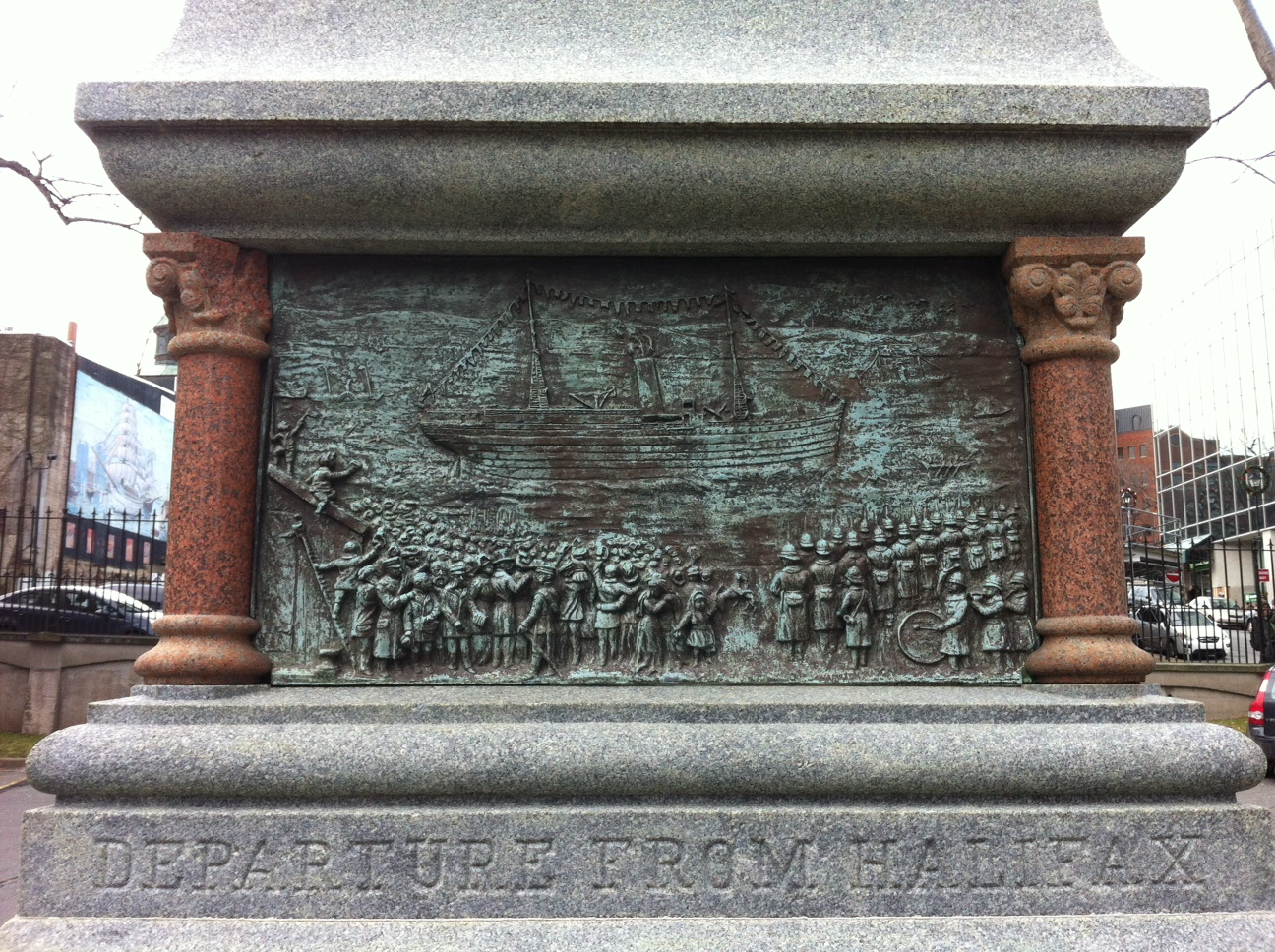
Departing Halifax

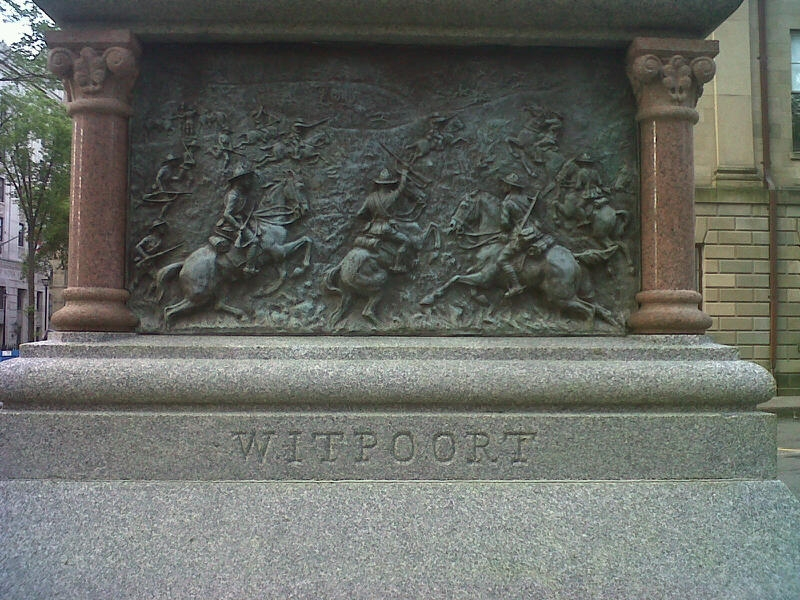
Battle of Witpoort, Boer War Monument, Province House, Nova Scotia

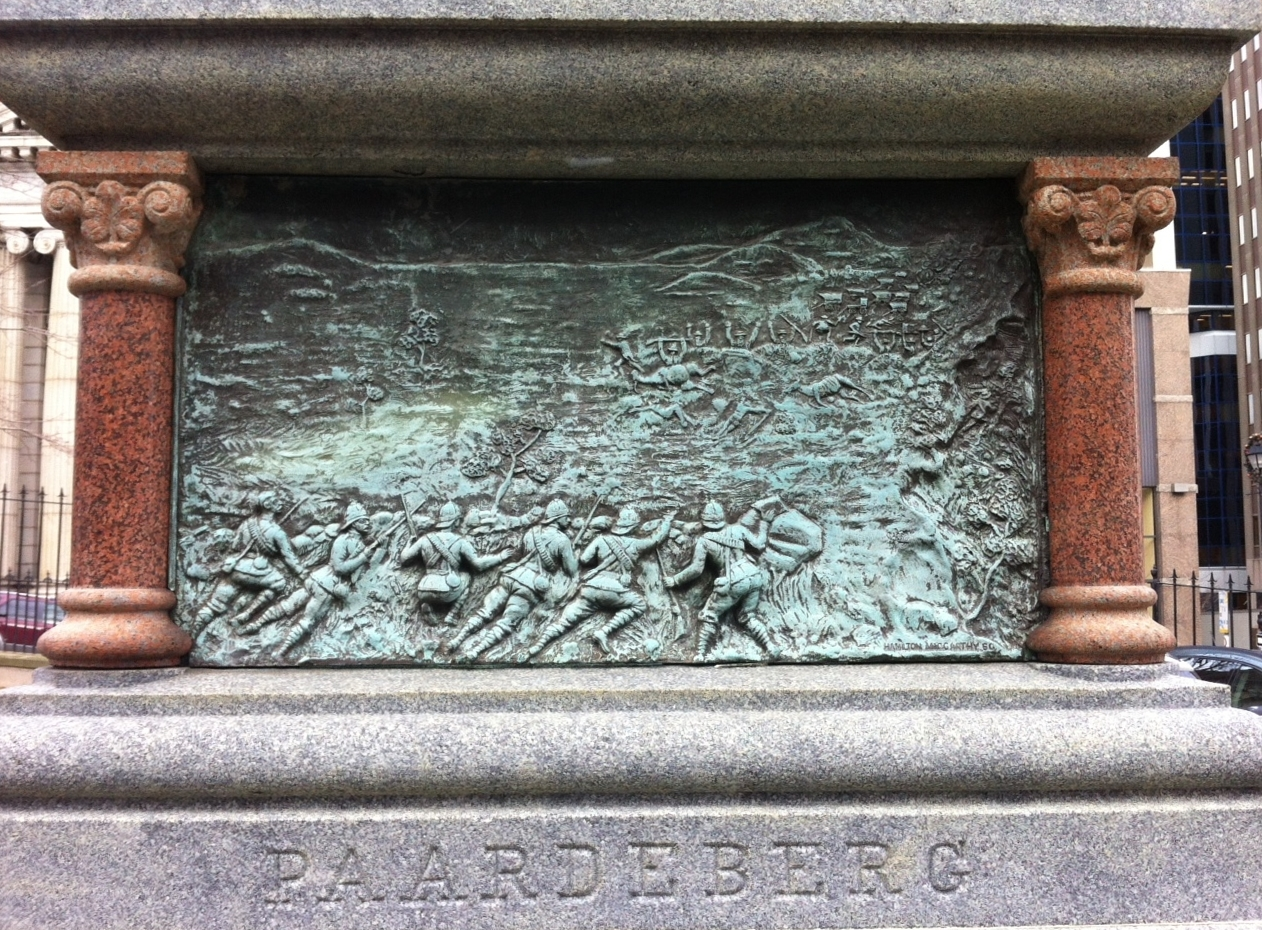
Battle of Paardeberg

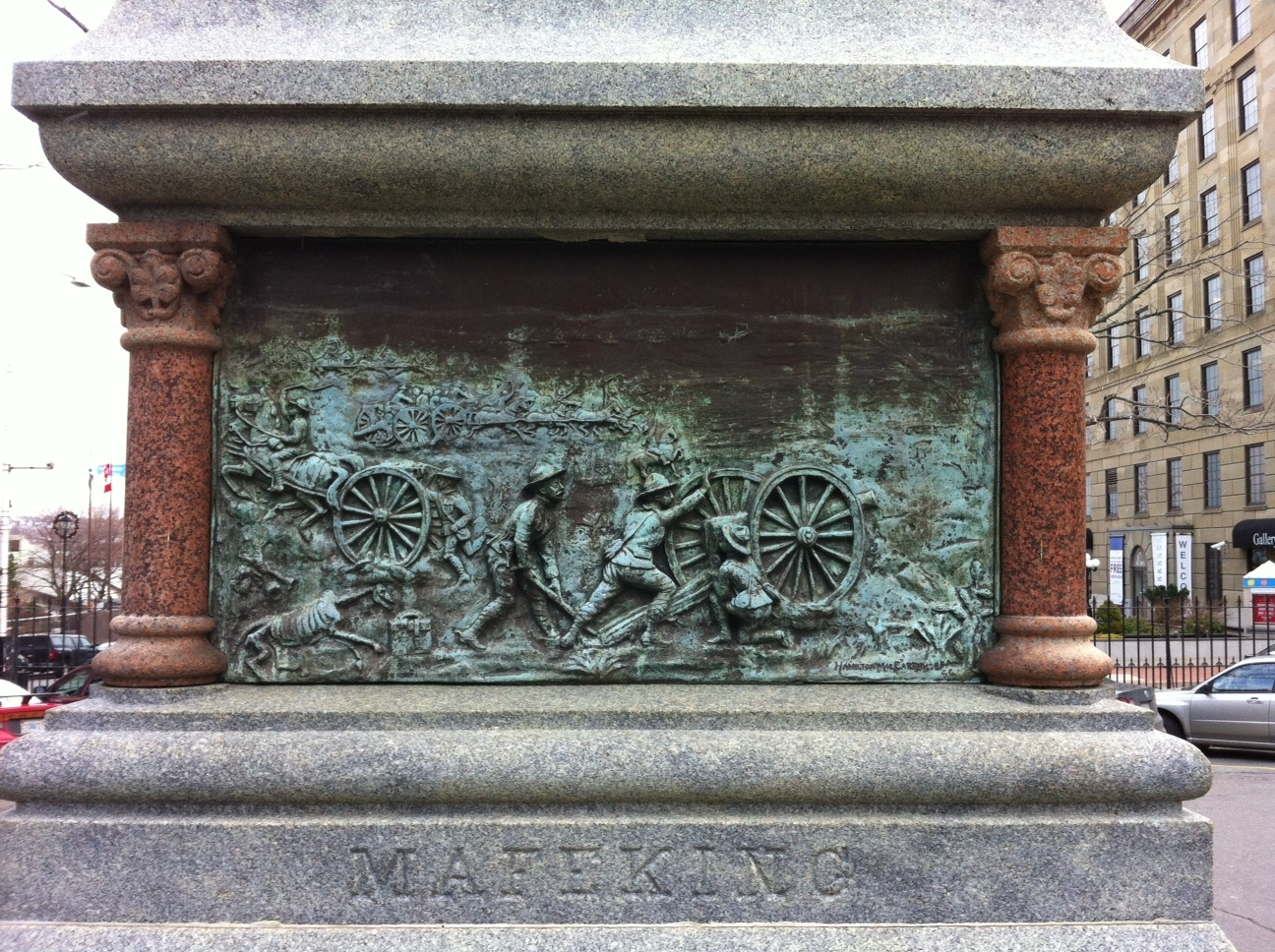
Siege of Mafeking

== Killed officers named on monument ==
- Major Harold Lothrop Borden (son of Frederick William Borden), King's Canadian Hussars
- Lieutenant Charles Carroll Wood (son of John Taylor Wood), Royal North Lancashire Regt.
- Lieutenant Barclay Webster (son of Barclay Webster), K.O.B.L.R.
- Captain John Halliburton Laurie (son of John Laurie Sr.), Royal Lancaster Regt.
- Lieutenant Monson Goudge Blanchard, 5th Regt, Canadian Artillery (also he has brass memorial plaque at St. John's Presbyterian Church, 613 King St, Windsor, Nova Scotia and is also listed on the memorial arch at Bay Street Armoury, Victoria, British Columbia)
- Captain Charles Albert Hensley, Royal Dublin Fusiliers
- Sergeant John E. Pemberton
- Sergeant John R. Margeson R.C.R.
- Corporal Harvey (Harry) Butler B. Williston

== See also ==
- South African War Memorial (Toronto)
- Boer War Memorial (Montreal)
- Military history of Nova Scotia
