= Harold Lothrop Borden =

Canadian military officer

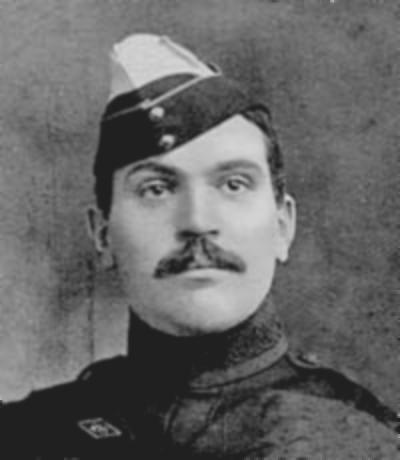
- Harold Lothorp Borden
- Born: 23 May 1876; Canning, Nova Scotia
- Died: 16 July 1900 (aged 24); Witpoort, South Africa
- Burial place: Braamfontein Cemetery, Brakpan, East Rand, South Africa
- Military career
- Allegiance: Canada
- Branch: Canadian Militia
- Service years: 1893 - 1900
- Rank: Major (The King's Canadian Hussars); Lieutenant (The Royal Canadian Dragoons)
- Units: The King's Canadian Hussars; The Royal Canadian Dragoons
- Conflicts: Second Boer War: Battle of Cortzee Drift; Battle of Faber's Put; Battle of Witpoort

Lieutenant Harold Lothrop Borden (23 May 1876 – 16 July 1900) was from Canning, Nova Scotia, and was the only son of Canada's Minister of Defence and Militia, Sir Frederick Borden, and was related to the future Prime Minister of Canada, Sir Robert Borden. Serving in the Royal Canadian Dragoons, he became the most famous Canadian casualty of the Second Boer War. Queen Victoria asked F. W. Borden for a photograph of his son, Prime Minister Wilfrid Laurier praised his services, tributes arrived from across Canada, and in his home town a monument (by Hamilton MacCarthy) was erected to his memory.

== Early life ==
Borden was born in 1876. He acquired an arts degree at Mount Allison University and was enrolled in medical school at McGill University when he enlisted in the war.

== Military career ==
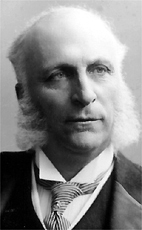
Sir Frederick Borden – While Canadian Minister of Defence, his only son Harold was killed in war

Borden's military career began in 1893, when he joined The King's Canadian Hussars, at that time an independent cavalry squadron. In 1897, as a member of Queen Victoria's Diamond Jubilee Contingent he received the Jubilee Medal. By 1899 he rose to the rank of Major and commanded the squadron. At the outbreak of the Second Boer War Borden accepted a reduction in rank to serve overseas with the second Canadian contingent to the war in South Africa. He was commissioned as a lieutenant into the 1st Battalion, Canadian Mounted Rifles and posted to the 1st Battalion's "B" Squadron as officer commanding the 4th Troop. He was brought to the attention of Field Marshal Lord Roberts', the British commander-in-chief in South Africa, for repeatedly swimming with Richard Turner across the Vet River at Coetzee's Drift, to draw the fire of the Boers who were dug in on the north bank (5 May 1900).

Borden also fought with distinction at the Battle of Faber's Put (30 May 1900). The battle was one of the most desperate actions faced by Canadians while campaigning in South Africa: 27 killed, 41 wounded, and the loss of a large number of horses. Field Marshal Lord Roberts reported: "Lieut. H. L. Borden, gallant conduct in swimming the Vet River under fire, 5 May, and in capturing some of the enemy’s wagons on 30 May."

The death of Lieutenant Harold Lothrop Borden at Witpoort on 16 July 1900 occurred when Lieutenant John Edgar Burch and he, while assisting the Royal Irish Fusiliers and some New Zealanders withstand a Boer assault on Witpoort ridge, led a counter-attack. It was successful, but Boer marksmen, standing less than 200 metres (660 ft) away, shot them as they stood up to lead the assault. Lord Roberts reported to the War Office that Borden and Burch "were killed while gallantly leading their men in a counter attack upon the enemy's flank at a critical juncture of his assault upon our position."

== Legacy ==
Borden is commemorated with various monuments and plaques. In his home town, Canning, Nova Scotia, is a statue by Hamilton MacCarthy. In Halifax, Nova Scotia, the base of the South African War Memorial has a panel commemorating the Battle of Witpoort. There is also a memorial plaque to Borden at McGill University, Montreal, in the Strathcona Medical Building (now the Strathcona Anatomy and Dentistry Building). Borden was a medical student at McGill before joining the war effort. He is listed on the Memorial Arch at the Royal Military College of Canada. Finally, there is also a plaque to Borden and others who died at Witpoort at Braamfontein Cemetery in South Africa where he is buried.

== Gallery ==
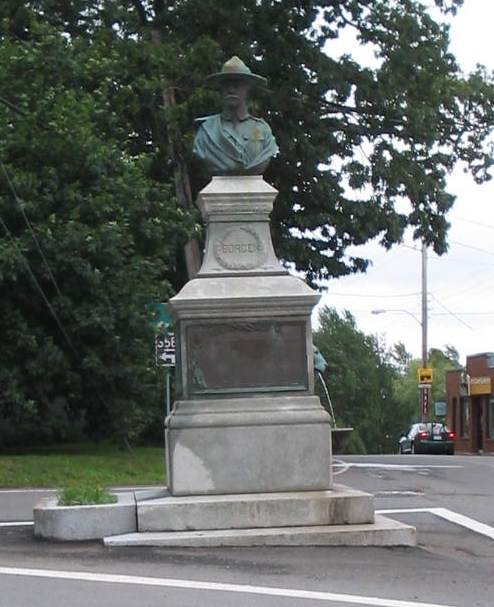
Harold Borden Monument, Canning, Nova Scotia

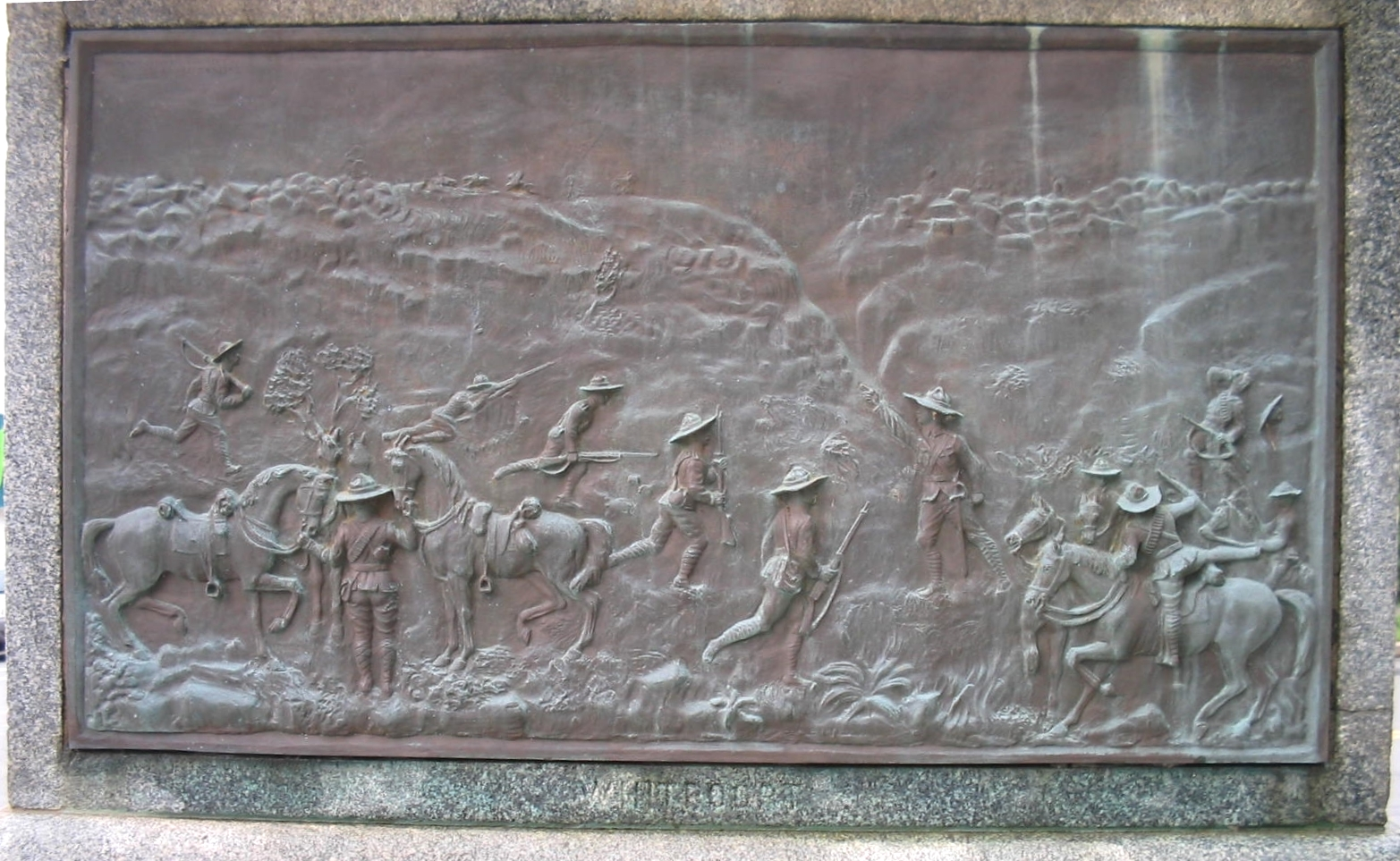
Battle of Witpoort, Harold Borden Monument, Canning, Nova Scotia

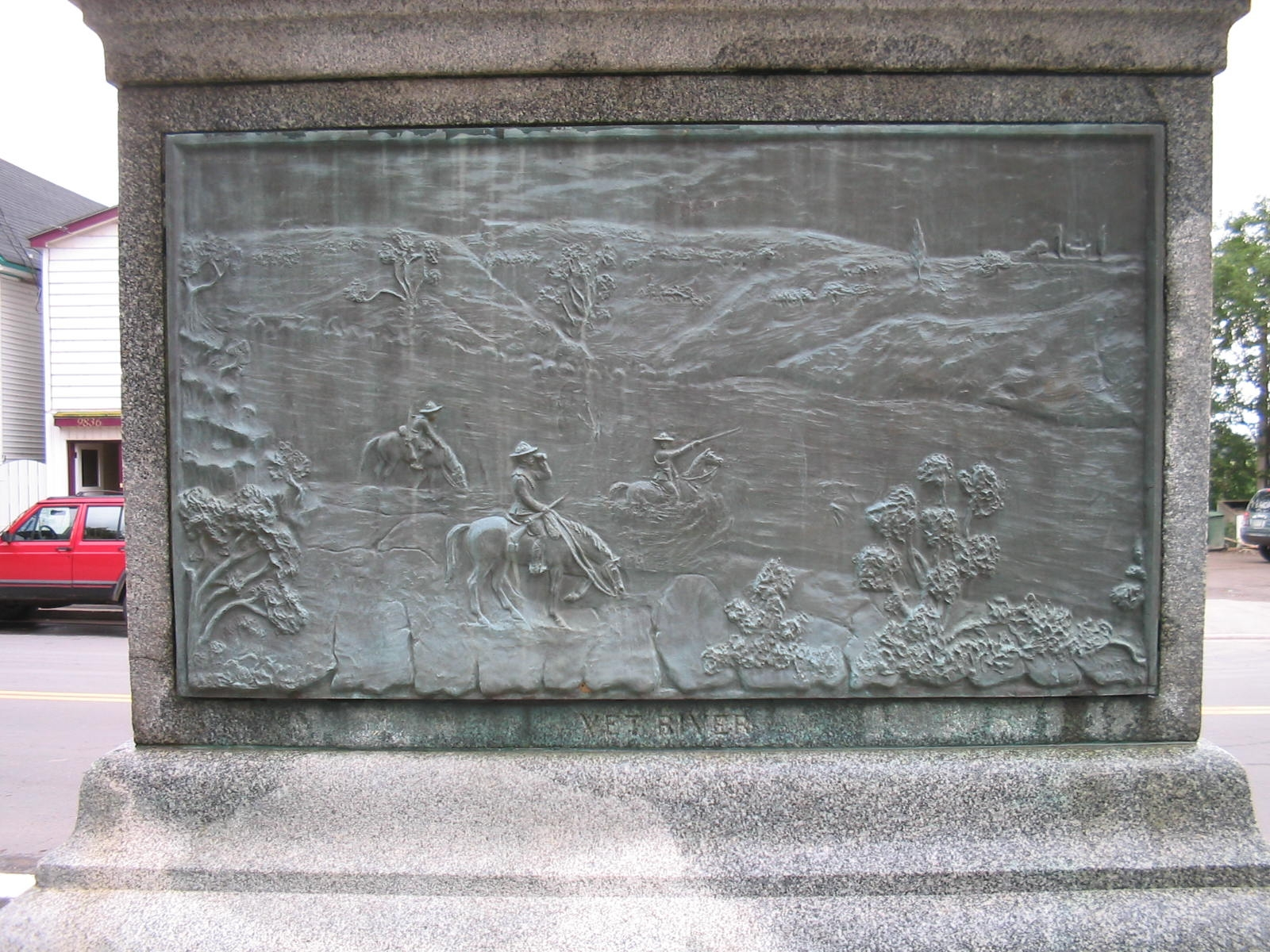
Battle of Cortzee Drift (Vet River), Harold Borden Monument, Canning, Nova Scotia

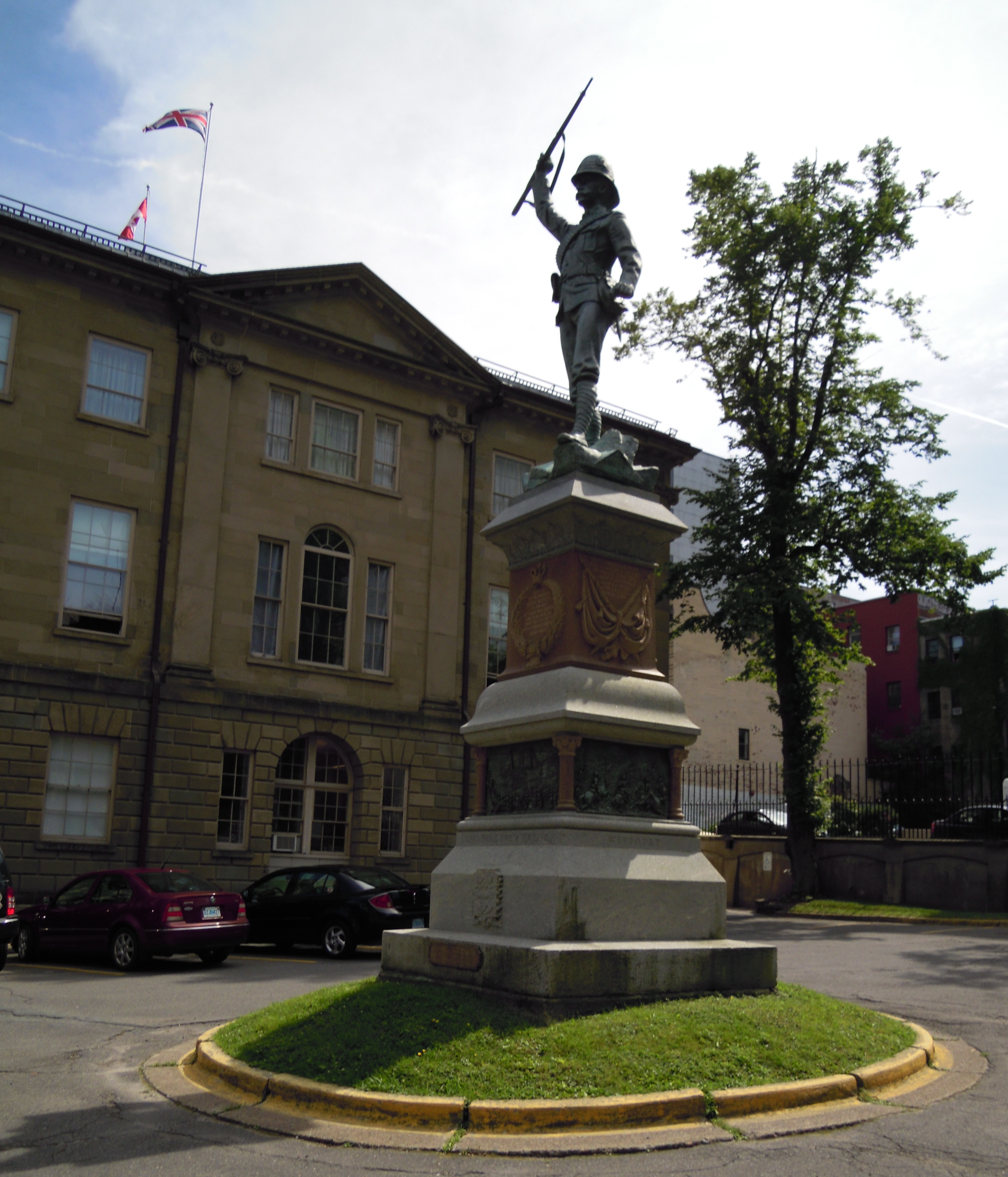
South African War Memorial (Halifax), Province House, Nova Scotia

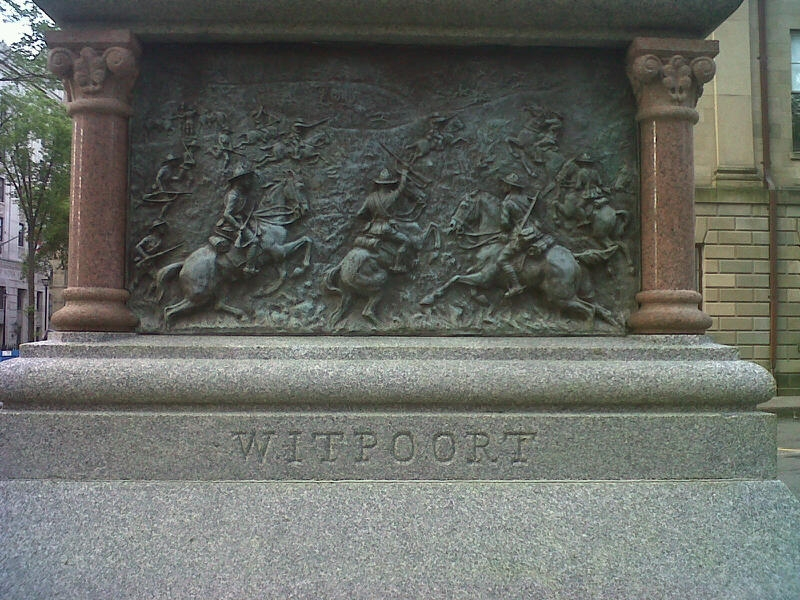
Battle of Witpoort, South African War Memorial (Halifax)

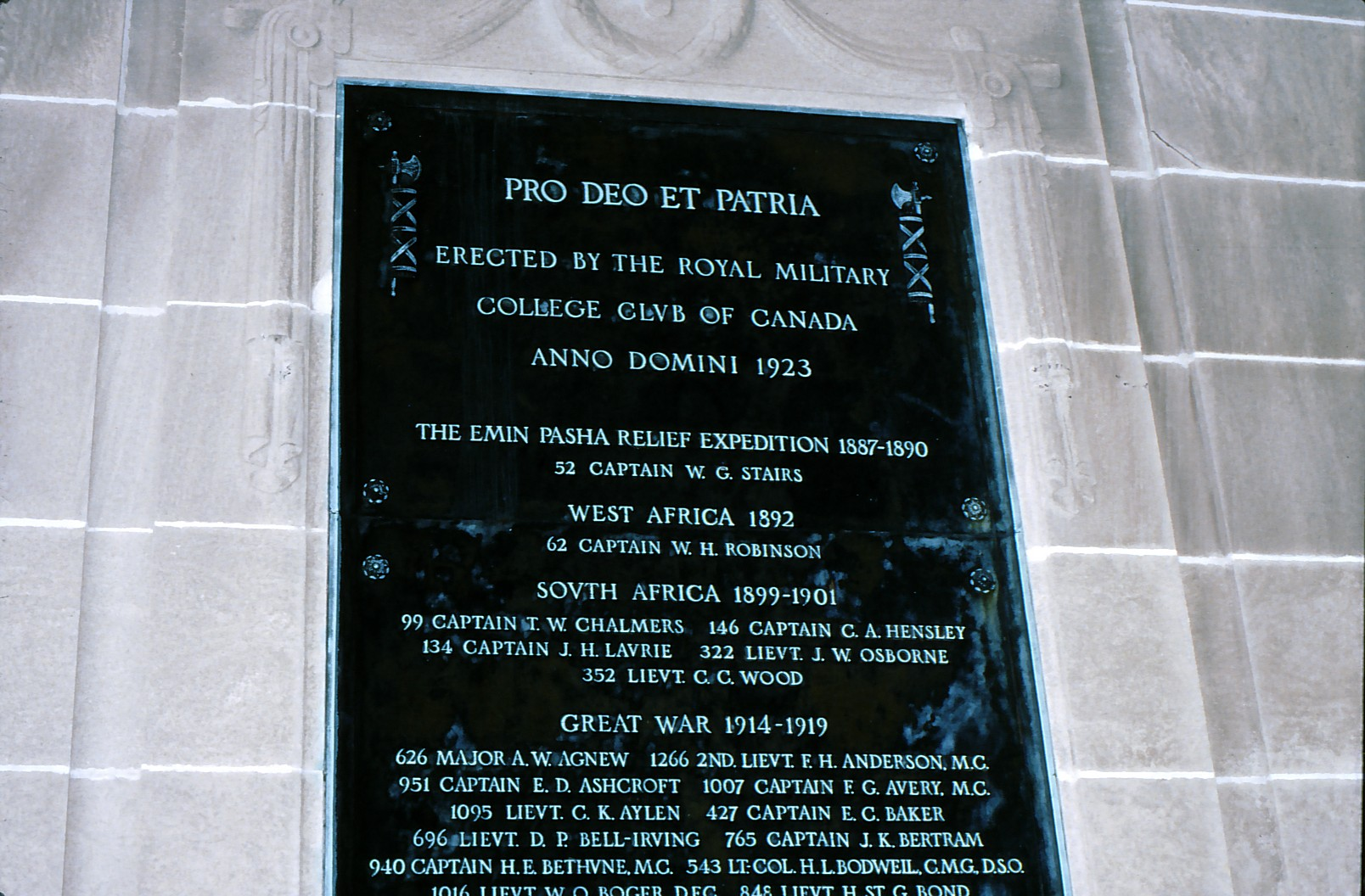
Memorialized on the Royal Military College Memorial Arch.

== See also ==
- Military history of Nova Scotia
