= John Edgar Burch =

- Born: February 8, 1874; St. Ann's, Ontario
- Died: July 16, 1900 (aged 26); Witpoort, South Africa
- Military career
- Allegiance: Canada
- Branch: Canadian Militia
- Service years: 1893–1900
- Rank: Lieutenant
- Units: 2nd Dragoons; Royal Canadian Dragoons
- Conflicts: Second Boer War: Battle of Witpoort

Lieutenant John Edgar Burch (February 8, 1874 – July 16, 1900) was an officer of the Canadian Militia (now the Canadian Army). Serving with the 1st Canadian Mounted Rifles (later The Royal Canadian Dragoons) during the Boer War, he was killed in action at the Battle of Witpoort alongside Lieutenant Harold Lothrop Borden while leading a counter-attack on the Boer positions.

== Early life ==
John Edgar Burch was born on February 8, 1874, in St. Ann's, Ontario, the youngest son of Major F.O. Burch of the 2nd Dragoons.

He attended High School at Smithville and later received training in business principles at Hamilton Business College.

== Military career ==
Burch’s military career began in 1893, when at age 18 he enlisted in the Canadian Militia as a Trooper (a Private in the Cavalry) with B Squadron of the 2nd Dragoons, his father’s regiment. Showing great promise, he was eventually promoted to Sergeant and attended the militia’s cavalry school at Stanley Barracks in Toronto, and after being commissioned as a lieutenant he attended the cavalry school a further 3 times. From his time attending the cavalry school, He became very popular with the officers stationed at Stanley Barracks and was well known for his horsemanship, swordsmanship and leadership abilities. He was also considered within his own regiment as one of its best officers and would later be promoted from the senior lieutenant of B Squadron to the regimental adjutant of the 2nd Dragoons.

== South Africa ==
With the outbreak of the Second Boer War and the Second Contingent was being raised, Burch volunteered for service and accepted a position as a lieutenant with the 1st Battalion, Canadian Mounted Rifles (later The Royal Canadian Dragoons (Special Service Force)). Assigned to A Squadron of the battalion, Burch would see constant action in South Africa and was well known as a cool-headed, quick-witted and brave officer. His letters and the reports of those who fought and lived with him give sufficient evidence that he was a born soldier.

Lieutenant John Edgar Burch was killed in action on July 16, 1900, during the Battle of Witpoort. Fighting alongside Lieutenant Harold Lothrop Borden (who also killed the same day and is the most famous Canadian casualty of the Boer War), Lieutenants Burch and Borden lead a counter-attack on Boer positions in support of the Royal Irish Fusiliers and the New Zealand Mounted Rifles. Leading their men to within a few yards of the enemy, Lieutenant Borden was killed and Lieutenant Burch along with 4 other Canadians soon found themselves surrounded. When the Boers called for them to surrender, Burch and his men refused and held off at least 40 Boers before Lieutenant Burch was killed.

John Reeves, the colonel of the Royal Irish Fusiliers, wrote, “In the few words I spoke to you (Colonel Lessard) last night at the funeral of your two very gallant officers I am afraid I failed to convey the deep gratitude my regiment owes to the 1st Canadian Mounted Rifles for their gallantry in going so nobly and fearlessly to the succour of our beleaguered detachment at Witpoort yesterday. The counterattack your regiment made occurred at a most critical moment, and doubtless saved many of the lives of our detachment.”

Lord Roberts would later mention in his report to the War Office that Borden and Burch "were killed while gallantly leading their men in a counter attack upon the enemy's flank at a critical juncture of his assault upon our position."

== Legacy ==
Burch is commemorated with various monuments and plaques. At CFB Petawawa in Ontario, his name along with that of Borden appears on a Memorial Plaque – Brass Tablet located at the entrance of the Headquarters of The Royal Canadian Dragoons. In St. Catharines, ON, his name appears on a memorial plaque at the Lake Street Armoury and on the war memorial at the St. Catharines Municipal Building. He is remembered on page 6 of the South African War Book of Remembrance on Parliament Hill. Finally, there is also a plaque to Borden, Burch and others who died at Witpoort at Braamfontein Cemetery in South Africa where he is buried.
