= Battle of Witpoort =

1900 battle of the Second Boer War

- Part of Second Boer War
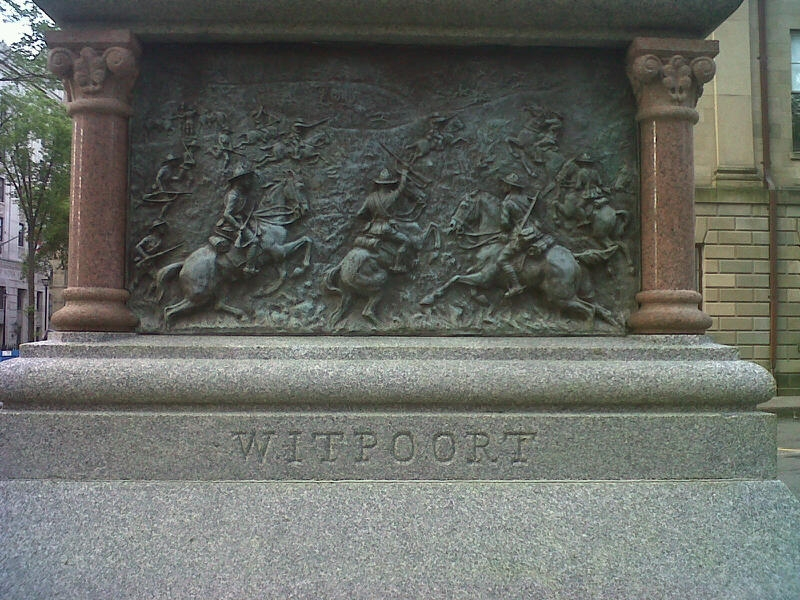
- Battle of Witpoort, South African War Memorial (Halifax), Nova Scotia
Date	16 July 1900
Location	Witpoort, South Africa
Result	British Empire victory

Belligerents
British Empire: Canada; New Zealand; Queensland; United Kingdom	South African Republic

Commanders and leaders
Major-General Edward Hutton; Major Frederick Henry Munn	General Ben Viljoen; Roland Schikkerling

Casualties and losses
7 killed 30 wounded 2 officers and 22 soldiers captured	2 killed 7 wounded

The Battle of Witpoort was fought during the Second Anglo-Boer War. Major Frederick Henry Munn commanded the detachment of the Royal Irish Fusiliers at Witpoort which was attacked on 16 July 1900, his orders being to "hold his position at all costs". The Boers called on Major Munn to surrender, but, scornfully refusing, he held out from daybreak till 2 pm, when the Canadian forces mounted a counterattack and the Boers retired. The battle became famous because of the death of Harold Lothrop Borden.

== Context ==
The Second Boer War was fought from 11 October 1899 until 31 May 1902 between the British Empire and the Afrikaans-speaking Dutch settlers of two independent Boer republics, the South African Republic (Transvaal Republic) and the Orange Free State. It ended with a British victory and the annexation of both republics by the British Empire; both would eventually be incorporated into the Union of South Africa, a dominion of the British Empire, in 1910.

In the Battle of Witpoort, British commander Edward Hutton had four companies of the Royal Irish Fusiliers, the 1st Mounted Infantry, which was made up of the 1st and 2nd Canadians (who had arrived in camp on 15 July), as well as the Australians of the Queensland Mounted Infantry. Under the command of Major Munn were three companies of the Royal Irish Fusiliers (or four, according to 'G' Troop) and 60 troopers of the New Zealand Mounted Rifles were placed on the three hills straddling the Witpoort Pass, The British officers were charged by South African Republic General Ben Viljoen and renowned Boer fighter Roland Schikkerling.

== Order of Battle ==
British and Empire forces:

- Royal Irish Fusiliers
- 1st Canadian Mounted Infantry
- 2nd Canadian Mounted Infantry
- Queensland Mounted Infantry
- New Zealand Mounted Rifles

Boer forces:

- Johannesburg Commando

== Battle ==
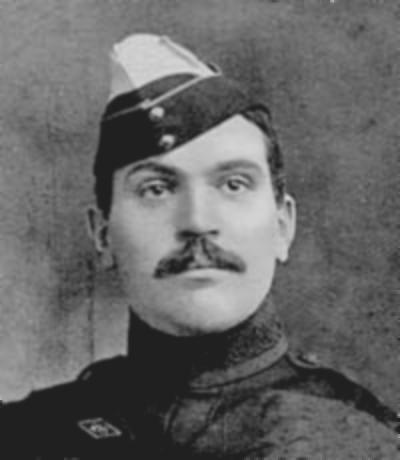
Harold Lothrop Borden

South African Republic General Ben Viljoen had positioned his troops for attack during the night of 15 July and then launched a three-pronged assault on Major Munn and the Irish positions at daybreak. Viljoen ordered a 'general storming of the British's entrenchments'. The battle opened at 06.45 with heavy shelling on Major Munn's troops. Renowned Boer fighter Roland Schikkerling and his comrades went to the north of the New Zealanders' ridge and then charged under heavy rifle fire. The New Zealanders surrendered one of the three hills they occupied, the Boers were in possession of the higher hill which commanded the lower middle hill. Schikkerling captured a captain and twenty New Zealanders and some continued right over the ridge and captured a number of horses. (Boer Willem Morkel du Toit died in the charge.)

The Canadians mounted a counter-attack. Colonel Edwin Alderson sent two squadrons of the Canadians to assist 'the Irish on the kopje which had been vacated by the New Zealanders' and, with the fire from the guns, the position was regained. Lieutenants Borden and John Edgar Burch of 'B' Squadron led a counter-attack. They were successful, but at the cost of their lives. Boer marksmen less than 200 yards distant shot them as they stood up to lead the rifles forward. Lord Roberts reported to the War Office that Borden and Burch "were killed while gallantly leading their men in a counter attack upon the enemy's flank at a critical juncture of his assault upon our position."

At 14.00, British officer Edward Hutton moved all of his available troops onto the desperately regained positions and, by sundown, the battle of Witpoort had ended. His losses were seven killed, with 30 wounded. Two officers and 22 soldiers had been taken prisoner. The Canadian losses were heavy and included Lt Borden, the son of the Canadian Minister of Defence. He is buried at the Braamfontein Cemetery, not far from the grave of Willem Morkel du Toit.

Another famous Canadian casualty was Trooper Lorne Mulloy who was blinded in both eyes and awarded the Distinguished Conduct Medal.

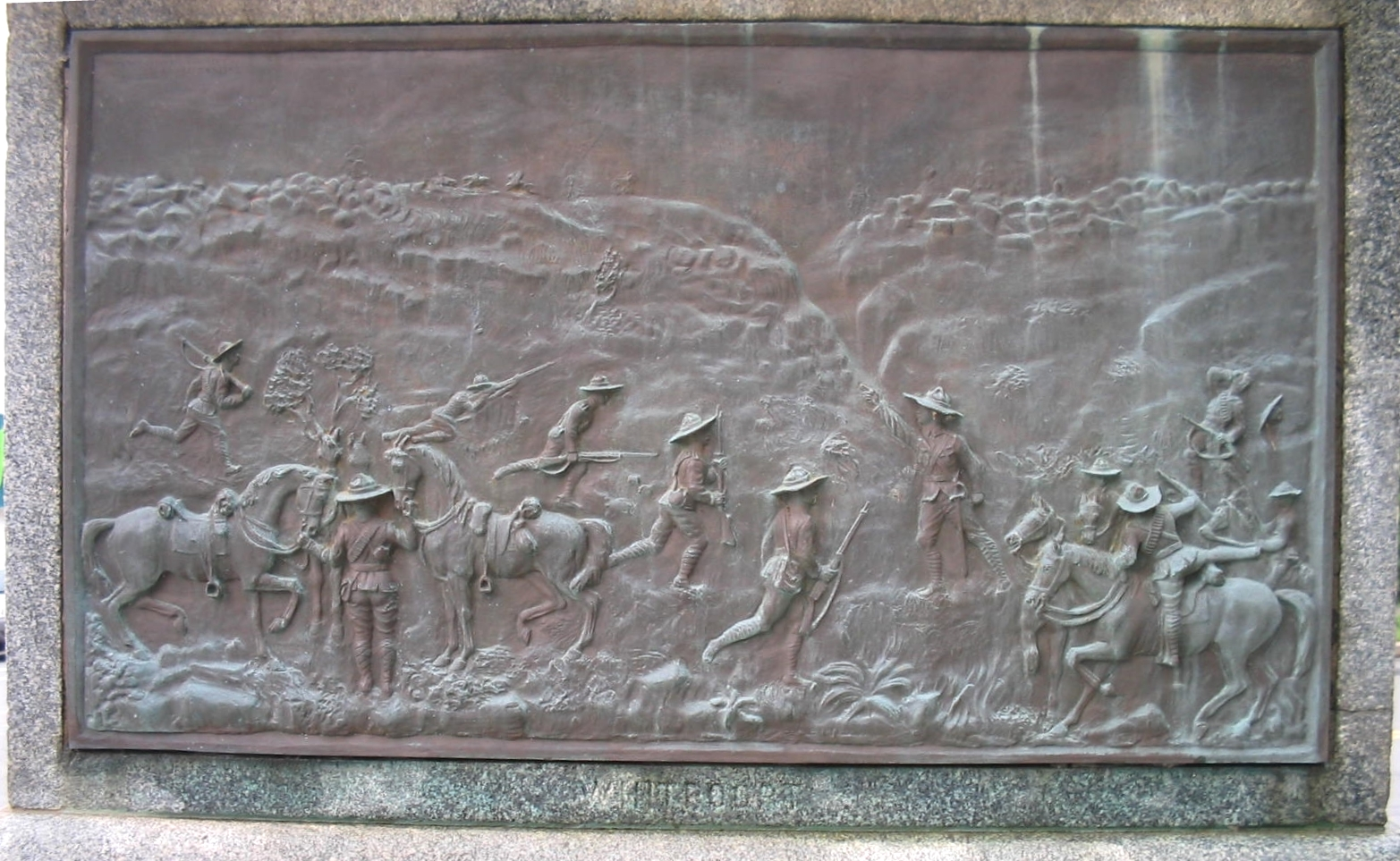
Battle of Witpoort, Harold Lothrop Borden Monument, Canning, Nova Scotia

== Legacy ==
Witpoort is a well-preserved Anglo-Boer War battlefield site featuring 51 small two- and four-man stone breastworks (sangars) constructed by New Zealand troops. The line of stone shelters marks the position from which the New Zealanders fired on advancing Boer forces. During the engagement, Willem Morkel was killed, and Roland Schikkerling and other Johannesburg commandos advanced across the ground below the sangars, where Schikkerling took prisoners.

On the south of the ridge Colonel Alderson led his Canadians in their counter-attack toward the captured position. Today, this area is a well tended farm and in the north, the level ground over which the Boers charged is now a wattle plantation.

This battle site, with its clearly identifiable sangars, deserves to be declared a Heritage Site under auspices of the new National Heritage Commission.

== See also ==
- Bombardment in the Second Boer War
- Military history of South Africa
- Military history of Nova Scotia
