= Kanner =

Kanner is a surname. Notable people with the surname include:

- Alexis Kanner (1942–2003), French-born English actor
- Ellie Kanner, American film and television director
- Heinrich Kanner (1864–1930), Austrian author
- Leo Kanner (1894–1981), Austrian-American psychiatrist
- Patrick Kanner (born 1957), French politician
- Stephen Kanner (1955–2010), American architect

== See also ==
- Canner (surname)
