= Libel trial of Joseph Howe =

1835 court case in Nova Scotia

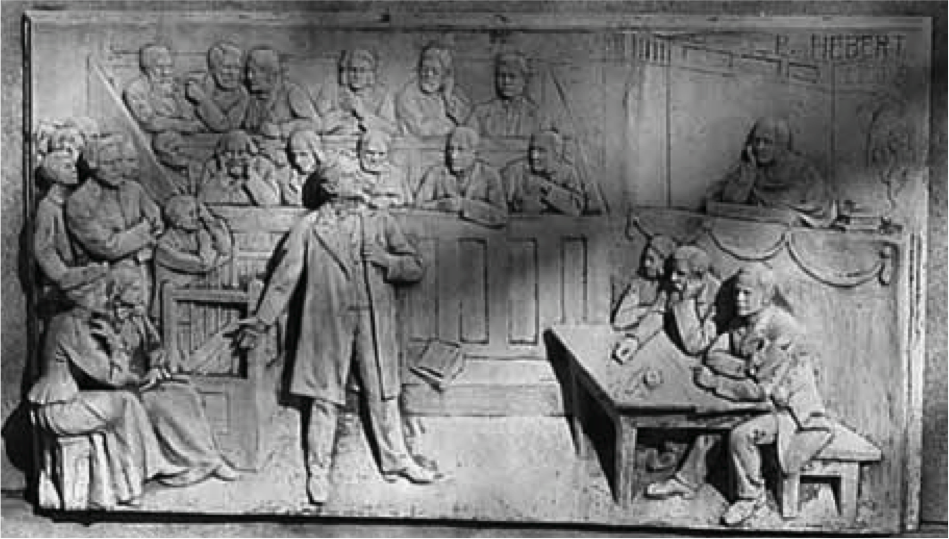
Libel Trial of Joseph Howe, Supreme Court (current Legislative Library), Province House (Nova Scotia) by Louis-Philippe Hébert

The Libel trial of Joseph Howe was a court case heard 2 March 1835 in which newspaper editor Joseph Howe was charged with seditious libel by civic politicians in Nova Scotia. Howe's victory in court was considered monumental at the time. In the first issue of the Novascotian following the acquittal, Howe claimed that "the press of Nova-Scotia is Free." Scholars, such as John Ralston Saul, have argued that Howe's libel victory established the fundamental basis for the freedom of the press in Canada. Historian Barry Cahill writes that the trial was significant in colonial legal history because it was a long delayed replay of the Zenger case (1734).

== Background ==
During the year 1834, Howe was starting to attract attention to himself due to his strong independent viewpoints in his editorials in the Novascotian, the Government was starting to take notice. Howe had eventually reached his breaking point and in late 1834 wrote in the Novascotian that he was going to start a campaign in the interest of bringing to light the wrongful actions of government. On January 1, 1835, the final piece of this campaign was published in the Novascotian, a letter signed "The People".

This letter accused the magistrates of, "reprehensible irresponsibility, incompetence, and self-interestedness in the conduct of their responsibilities." Specifically, in the letter Joseph Howe accused Halifax politicians and police of pocketing £30,000 over a thirty-year period. Due to the letter being published, Howe was put on trial for seditious libel, being charged with "seditiously contriving, devising, and intending to stir up and incite discontent and sedition among His Majesty's subjects." The crime of seditious libel had only been defined 200 years prior to the time of Howe's trial and was seen by many as an unfair crime as it could be as broad or as specific as the court chose."

== Trial ==
The trial took place in the present day library of Province House (Nova Scotia) and the judge in the case was Brenton Halliburton. Howe represented himself in the trial as no lawyer would defend him. Howe used as the basis of his argument the Libel Act 1792 (32 Geo. 3. c. 60). He presented for six and a quarter hours addressing the jury, citing case after case of civic corruption. He spoke eloquently about the importance of press freedom, urging jurors "to leave an unshackled press as a legacy to your children." Even though the judge instructed the jury to find Howe guilty, jurors took only ten minutes to acquit him.

== Legacy ==
The victory of Howe in the court was considered monumental at the time. In the first issue of the Novascotian following the acquittal, Howe claimed that "the press of Nova-Scotia is Free." Some scholars have argued that Howe's libel victory changed little in the strict legal sense; other scholars, however, insist that the case established the fundamental basis for the freedom of the press in Canada.

Joseph Howe scholar J. Murray Beck argues that, though Howe was victorious convincing a jury that the libel law was unjust, his trial had no immediate effect on changing the civil or criminal code with respect to libel. Beck asserts that the idea that Howe's trial contributed to the freedom of the press in Canada is a, "myth that has little basis in fact". In fact, eight years after the trial, Howe's successor at the Novascotian Richard Nugent was charged and found guilty of libel (1843). Nugent was imprisoned due to his inability to pay damages. Beck also notes that in 1843, the British Parliament passed a law that allowed the accused to use truth of the libel as their defence, which led to freedom of the press.

Scholars have agreed with the strict legal sense of Beck's argument. However, scholar Cecil Rosner states, "The Howe trial is noteworthy more for its symbolic effect than any legal precedent it may have set...charges of sedition have largely disappeared [but] journalists across the country continue to face civil libel threats...".

Lyndsay M. Campbell argues that the trial did eventually change the law. Howe was the first in Nova Scotia to argue intent before a jury. Campbell also notes that while Howe's defence did not persuade the presiding judge, it was a defense that would be used by lawyers in future cases. Howe changed how the law was perceived by both the legal profession and by the general public. The timing of the trial was crucial to the lasting effect it had on Canada. It occurred when the number of newspapers was growing rapidly and they were all pushing their own boundaries when it came to political commentary. Howe's trial removed the fear of prosecution from these newspapers for having political commentary of their own, as Campbell puts it, "The sense of what was possible had changed."

John Ralston Saul states that by, "...winning his acquittal, Howe established the fundamental ideas, principles, and shapes of freedom of speech and freedom of the press in Canada." Saul acknowledges that, in terms of freedom of speech and freedom of the press, the laws have regressed and progressed multiple times since Howe's trial. Saul argues that Howe created the, "...intellectual foundation of how we still struggle to solidify and to widen the nature of freedom of speech and of the press." Saul states that Howe's trial also had a significant influence on the Canadian Charter of Rights and Freedoms. He argues there is a clear link between Howe's defense and lines 9 and 10 of the Charter, which refer to freedom of speech and freedom of the press. Saul also references many public leaders across Canada since Howe's trial who were influenced by him, such as Fred Dickson who was the leader of the 1919 Winnipeg Strike on trial for seditious libel, who read Howe's defence was their own to, "speak from an ethical center in their own public lives."

== Film ==
In 1961, the National Film Board of Canada (NFB) produced a 28-minute film about the trial entitled Joseph Howe: The Tribune of Nova Scotia.

== See also ==
- Freedom of speech in Canada
