= Canned =

Canned may refer to:

- "Canned", an episode of Rocko's Modern Life
- Canning of food
- Dismissal (employment)
- Drunkenness
- produced and conserved to be released on demand, e.g.
  - Canned air
  - Canned hunt
  - Canned laughter
  - Canned response

== See also ==
- Canned Carrott
- Canned Heat
- Canned music (disambiguation)
