= Canner (surname) =

Origin
- Meaning: maker of (metal) cans
- Reaney, P. H. (2005) Dictionary of British Surnames; rev. R. M. Wilson; 3rd ed. Oxford: Oxford University Press

Canner is an English surname found mainly in the Midlands of England and also distributed in New England and elsewhere. It was first recorded as early as 1201 but has never been at all common: the meaning was thought by P. H. Reaney to be a tradesman who made base-metal cans (e.g. ale cans, oil cans, etc.)

In Hanks, Patrick et al. (2002) The Oxford Names Companion. Oxford U P; p. 109 there is an entry for Cann which claims that Canner is just a variant. No explanation is given and the two names have as far as the evidence goes to be quite separate: that part of the volume was first issued in 1988 (ed. Hanks & Hodges). The very early record is—le Cannere and the distribution in the Midlands suggests Burton on Trent as significant (Burton Abbey was famous for the brewing of beer and ale which still continues commercially).

People with the surname include:

- Liz Canner (born 1968), American filmmaker
- Thomas Canner, Archdeacon of Dorset from 1542 to 1547

== See also ==
- Kanner
