= Heinrich Kanner =

Austrian writer, journalist and newspaper editor

Heinrich Kanner (November 9, 1864 – February 15, 1930) was an Austrian writer, journalist and newspaper editor.

Heinrich Kanner attended high school and studied at the University in Vienna. Initially, he was a correspondent for the "Frankfurter Zeitung" in Vienna. In 1894, Kanner founded together with the economist Isidore Singer, and the writer Hermann Bahr, the weekly newspaper "Die Zeit". What "Die Zeit" differed from all that time in Austria-Hungary, published liberal newspapers, was the deviation from the foreign policy of the German-Austrian alliance. Employees of "Die Zeit" were people like Bertha von Suttner, Theodor Herzl, Thomas G. Masaryk, Felix Salten and Anton Wildgans. Hermann Bahr was the head of the cultural arts pages, script manager was Grethe Schmahl-Wolf. In 1904, "Die Zeit" turned to a daily newspaper, which appeared until 1918, and in the time of World War I was subject to strict censorship measures. Even during the Great War Heinrich Kanner started his research for the question of the war guilt. For this purpose during the war, he interviewed a number of prominent representatives of public life, including Leon von Bilinski, who was shared Finance Minister of the monarchy from 1912 to 1915, and has participated in key meetings and discussions on foreign policy during this period. Bilinski testified in talks with Kanner that Emperor Franz Joseph was determined since the spring of 1913 to authorize necessary action in the Balkans without consultations to the risk of a clash with Russia. After the Great War Kanner worked as a political journalist on to the political questions of the First World War, he visited several times the National Archives in Vienna, to study the preserved original records.

== Literature (selection) ==
- "Typewritten Manuscripts 1914–1917" The Hoover Institution On War, Revolution and Peace; Stanford University, Kalifornien - two Boxes [ID: CSUZ25001-A].
- "Recent History Lie", Vienna 1921.
- "William II's farewell letter to the German people. The Germans a mirror.", Berlin 1922.
- "Imperial Disaster Policy", Leipzig 1922.
- "The Key to the War-Guilt", Munich 1926.
- "The War. Political Monthly Magazine", Vienna 1929.

== Sources ==
- "Elite": The intellectual elite of Austria: a handbook of the leaders in culture and economy / edited by Marcell Klang. - Vienna 1936.
- Robert A. Kann "Emperor Franz Joseph and the outbreak of World War I". - Wienna 1971.
- Donald G. Daviau "The Man of Tomorrow. Hermann Bahr 1863–1934". - Vienna 1984.
- Herbert Gantschacher "Witness and Victim of the Apocalypse". - Vienna-Salzburg-Arnoldstein-Prora-Berlin 2008.
