= Seditious libel =

Criminal offences under English common law

Seditious libel is a criminal offence under common law of printing written material with seditious purpose – that is, the purpose of bringing contempt upon a political authority. It is still an offence in Canada but has been abolished in England and Wales, although similar provisions continue to exist under different wording in other statutes.

American scholar Leonard W. Levy argues that seditious libel "has always been an accordion-like concept, expandable or contractible at the whim of judges".

== England, Wales and Northern Ireland ==
Under the common law of England, Wales and Northern Ireland, a statement was seditious under the common law if it brought into "hatred or contempt" either the King or his heirs, the government and constitution, either House of Parliament, or the administration of justice; or if it incited people to attempt to change any matter of Church or state established by law (except by lawful means); or if it promoted discontent among or hostility between British subjects. A person was only guilty of the offence if they had printed words or images and intend any of the above outcomes. Proving that the statement is true was not a defence but in the Trial of the Seven Bishops (1688), the seven Lords Spiritual including the Archbishop of Canterbury were acquitted of seditious libel because they had been exercising their right to petition. As a common law offence whose sentence was not specified by statute, it was punishable with up to life imprisonment or an unlimited fine or both.

Parliament abolished the offences of sedition and seditious libel in 2009. However, there continue to be similar offences in other statutes, such as the Terrorism Act 2000, which criminalises threats of action which are designed to "influence the government" or "to intimidate the public or a section of the public" for "the purpose of advancing a political, religious or ideological cause".

== Canada ==
In Canada, seditious offences are defined by sections 59 to 61 of the Criminal Code. A seditious offence can be punished by imprisonment up to a maximum term of 14 years. The concept of a "seditious intention" is defined in part as follows:

59(4) Without limiting the generality of the meaning of the expression "seditious intention", every one shall be presumed to have a seditious intention who

- (a) teaches or advocates, or
- (b) publishes or circulates any writing that advocates,

the use, without the authority of law, of force as a means of accomplishing a governmental change within Canada.

However, the breadth of this section is reduced by s 60, which provides "seditious intention" does not include communications made in good faith to criticise measures taken by the government, to point out errors or defects in government, or to point out matters that tend to produce ill-will between Canadians.

== Seditious speech in the United States ==
Seditious speech is speech directed at the overthrow of government. It includes speech attacking basic institutions of government, including particular governmental leaders. Its criminalization dates back at least as far as the Alien and Sedition Act.

According to John Cohan, "A delicate line can be crossed, whereby lawful criticism of government may become seditious speech, where associating with others in robust criticism of government may become subversive activities punishable by law". The Brandenburg v. Ohio U.S. Supreme Court decision maintains that seditious speech – including speech that constitutes an incitement to violence – is protected by the First Amendment to the United States Constitution as long as it does not reach a level "where such advocacy is directed to inciting or producing imminent lawless action and is likely to incite or produce such action".

During World War II, U.S. President Franklin D. Roosevelt pressured U.S. Attorney General Francis Biddle to prosecute seditionists, but Biddle declined, believing it to be unwise. Today's anti-war activists are not prosecuted for seditious speech.

== History ==
The crime of seditious libel was defined and established in England during the 1606 case De Libellis Famosis by the Star Chamber. The case defined seditious libel as criticism of public persons, the government, or King.

The phrase "seditious libel" and "blasphemous libel" were used interchangeably at that time, because of the strong unions between church and state. Blasphemy was later made a separate offence, and finally abolished with the passing of the Racial and Religious Hatred Act 2006. Sedition and seditious libel were abolished by section 73 of the Coroners and Justice Act 2009. Sedition by an alien is still an offence under the Aliens Restriction (Amendment) Act 1919.

The United States' Alien and Sedition Acts of 1798 broke with the common law precedent of the time, in that it allowed for truth as a defense, though judges were not consistent in their rulings.

John Peter Zenger was arrested and imprisoned for seditious libel in 1734 after his newspaper criticized the colonial governor of New York. Zenger spent nearly 10 months in jail before being acquitted by a jury on August 5, 1735. One hundred years later, Nova Scotia's Joseph Howe also won a jury acquittal on a charge of seditious libel after his newspaper printed allegations that local politicians and police were stealing from the people.

Having severely censured the actions of the government in print with reference to the 1819 Peterloo Massacre, Sir Francis Burdett was prosecuted at Leicester assizes, fined £1,000, and committed to prison by Best, J. for three months for the crime of "composing, writing, and publishing a seditious libel" with explanation:

My opinion of the liberty of the press is that every man ought to be permitted to instruct his fellow subjects; that every man may fearlessly advance any new doctrines, provided he does so with proper respect to the religion and government of the country; that he may point out errors in the measures of public men; but he must not impute criminal conduct to them. The liberty of the press cannot be carried to this extent without violating another equally sacred right; namely, the right of character. This right can only be attacked in a court of justice, where the party attacked has a fair opportunity of defending himself.

== See also ==
- Thoughtcrime
- Freedom of the press
- Blasphemy
- English defamation law
- Criminal anarchy
