= Canned music =

Canned music may refer to:

- Elevator music
- Muzak
- Recorded music
- Phonograph cylinder
- Commercial recordings played during lip-synching in music
- Karaoke
- "Canned Music", a 1972 song by Dan Hicks
- Canned Music, a 1983 EP by Tall Dwarfs
