= Canning Creek =

Coordinates: 38.686951°N 96.521670°W

Location
- Country: United States
- State: Kansas

Physical characteristics
- Source
  - location: Morris County, Kansas

Basin features
- River system: Stream

Canning Creek is a stream in Morris County, Kansas, in the United States.

Canning Creek is named after Nancy Canning, a pioneer settler.

== See also ==
- List of rivers of Kansas
