= Canning, Nova Scotia =

Canning
- Village
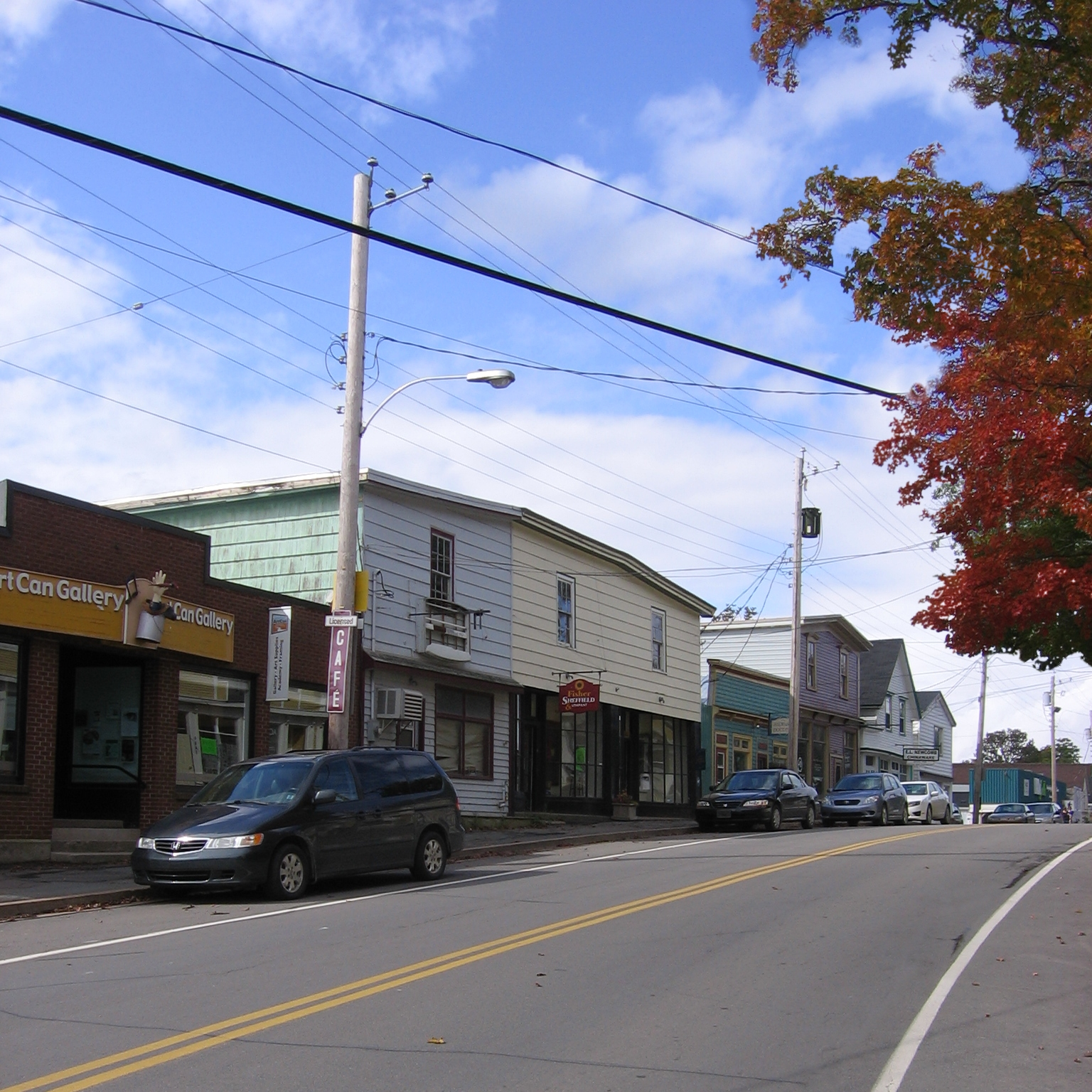

- Seal

- Location of Canning, Nova Scotia
- Coordinates: 45°09′28.5″N 64°25′27″W
- Country: Canada
- Province: Nova Scotia
- County: Kings
- Established: 1760

Government
  - Village committee: The village community committee
  - MLA: John Lohr (PC)
  - MP: Kody Blois (L)

Population (2021)
  - Total: 716
  - Density: 384.2/km^{2} (995/sq mi)
- Time zone: UTC-4 (AST)
  - Summer (DST): UTC-3 (ADT)
- Postal code: B0P 1H0
- Area code: 902
- Telephone Exchange: 582
- NTS Map: 021H01
- GNBC Code: CAGBD
- Website: canning.ca

Canning is a village in northeastern Kings County, Nova Scotia located at the crossroads of Route 221 and Route 358.

== History ==
The area was originally settled by Acadians who were expelled in 1755 during the Acadian Expulsion. After the Acadians, Canning - first called Apple Tree Landing and later Habitant Corner - was settled in 1760 by New England Planters and by the Dutch following World War II. The present name was adopted in honour of British prime minister George Canning.

Though much diminished in importance in recent years, Canning was once a major shipbuilding centre and shipping and rail hub for farmers in Kings County. Canning merchants and farmers founded the Cornwallis Valley Railway which ran from 1889 to 1961, connecting the village to the Dominion Atlantic Railway mainline in Kentville, Nova Scotia. The village suffered three major fires, in 1866, 1868 and 1912.

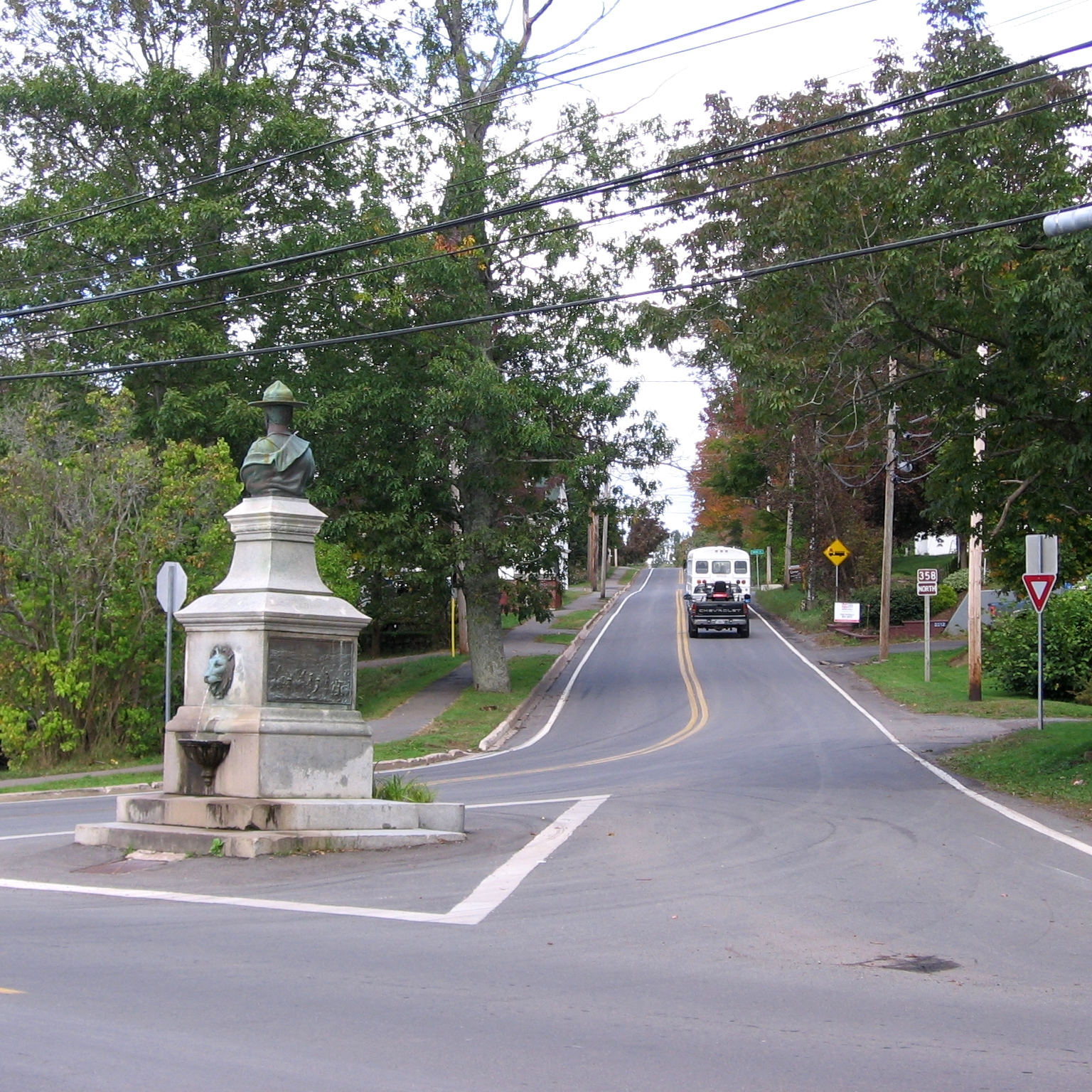
Harold Lothrop Borden Monument in Canning, NS

The Canadian parliamentarian Sir Frederick William Borden had a home in Canning. A cousin of Sir Robert Borden, Sir Frederick was Minister of Militia prior to the First World War. Canning has a prominent statue to the most famous Canadian casualty of the Second Boer War, Harold Lothrop Borden, a son of Sir Frederick. He died in the Battle of Witpoort.

Canning was also the home of country singer Wilf Carter. He was made an honorary citizen of Canning, Nova Scotia in 1978. Carter was born in Port Hilford, Nova Scotia, but spend a great deal of his childhood working in and visiting the village and its surrounding farmland.

The village is home to Glooscap Elementary School, with a student population of over 200, and Northeast Kings Education Centre (NKEC), a middle school/high school with a student population of around 1000 students and 80 staff. NKEC is the first AP Capstone designated school in Nova Scotia and the first in the world to offer the virtual AP Capstone Program.

The Canning Lighthouse was built in 1904 to serve the port at Borden's Wharf. It was restored in the 1990s, after more than 50 years of disuse and abandonment, and was used by the village as a tourist information centre. It was moved in 2003 to a new waterfront site on the Habitant River behind the village's small museum, where its top section was rebuilt by NKEC students. Canning is on the rise but is facing gentrification of the once affordable village.

== Demographics ==
In the 2021 Census of Population conducted by Statistics Canada, Canning had a population of 716 living in 311 of its 327 total private dwellings, a change of −2.1% from its 2016 population of 731. With a land area of 1.86 km^{2} (0.72 sq mi), it had a population density of 384.9/km^{2} (997.0/sq mi) in 2021.

Canning is home to numerous local amenities such as a supermarket, liquor store, pharmacy, hardware store, gas station/garage, coffee shop and multiple little restaurants, Canning is also home to a bank and serves the citizens of the local surrounding communities

== Library and natural attractions ==
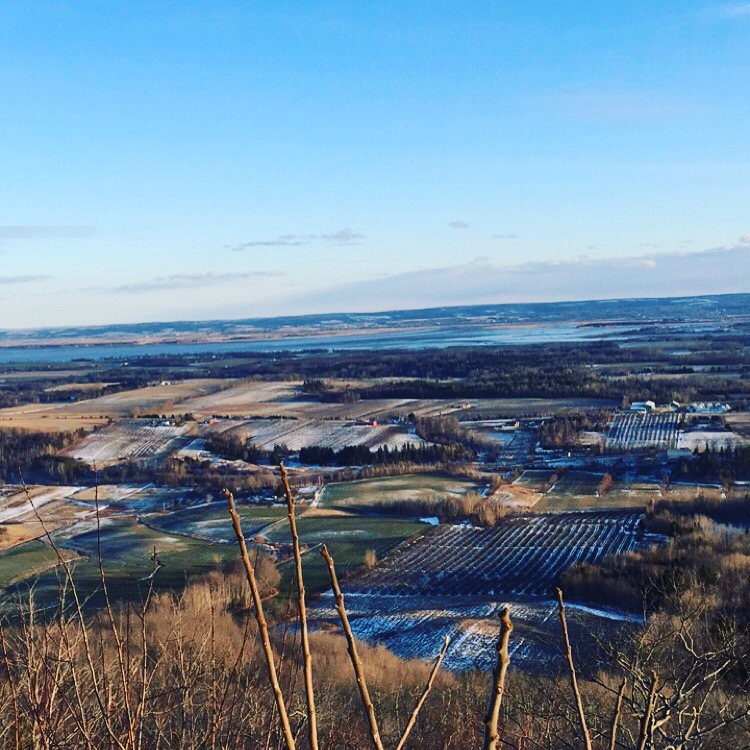
The Look Off, Spring 2018

- Merritt Gibson Memorial Library
- Bigelow Trail
- Blomidon Look-off Provincial Park
- Bruce Spicer Park
- Scots Bay Provincial Park
