= Witpoort =

- Location within Gauteng Location within South Africa
- Coordinates: 25°58′S 28°03′E
- Country: South Africa
- Province: Gauteng
- Municipality: City of Johannesburg
- Main Place: Midrand

Area
  - Total: 6.37 km^{2} (2.46 sq mi)

Population (2001)
  - Total: 934
  - Density: 147/km^{2} (380/sq mi)
- Time zone: UTC+2 (SAST)
- PO box: 2632

Witpoort is a suburb of Midrand in Gauteng, South Africa, just west of Blue Hills. It is located in Region A of the City of Johannesburg Metropolitan Municipality. It was the site of the Battle of Witpoort during the Second Boer War.
