= Ernest William Robinson =

Canadian politician

Member of Parliament for Kings
- In office December 1921 – October 1925
- Preceded by: Robert Laird Borden
- Succeeded by: riding dissolved

Personal details
- Born: Ernest William Robinson; 18 May 1875 Lakeville, Nova Scotia
- Died: 4 February 1952 (aged 76) Wolfville, Nova Scotia
- Party: Liberal
- Spouse: Alice Wood
- Profession: principal, teacher

Ernest William Robinson (18 May 1875 – 4 February 1952) was a Liberal party member of the House of Commons of Canada. He was born in Lakeville, Nova Scotia and became a principal and teacher.

The son of William Henry Robinson and Eliza Rouse, he was educated at Acadia University. In 1901, he married Alice Wood. Robinson was principal of Acadia Collegiate Academy and also served as Inspector of Schools in Wolfville, Nova Scotia.

He was elected to Parliament at the Kings riding in the 1921 general election. After serving his only federal term, the 14th Canadian Parliament, riding boundaries were changed and Robinson was defeated at his new riding of Hants—Kings by Arthur de Witt Foster of the Conservatives.
