= Frederick William Borden =

Canadian politician (1847–1917)

The Honourable Sir Frederick William Borden KCMG PC MD
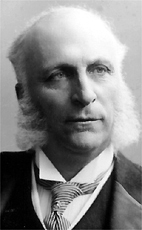

Minister of Militia and Defence
- In office 13 July 1896 – 6 October 1911
- Prime Minister: Sir Wilfrid Laurier
- Preceded by: David Tisdale
- Succeeded by: Sam Hughes

Personal details
- Born: May 14, 1847 Cornwallis Township, Nova Scotia
- Died: January 6, 1917 (aged 69) Canning, Nova Scotia Canada
- Party: Liberal
- Children: Harold Lothrop Borden
- Education: University of King's College; Harvard University
- Profession: Physician

Military service
- Allegiance: Canada
- Branch/service: Canadian militia
- Years of service: 1865 - 1900
- Rank: Cadet; Surgeon
- Unit: King’s College University Rifles; 68th King’s County Regiment
- Battles/wars: Fenian Raids

Sir Frederick William Borden, KCMG PC (May 14, 1847 – January 6, 1917) was a Canadian politician. While he was the Minister for Militia and Defence, he was the father of the most famous Canadian casualty of the Second Boer War, Harold Lothrop Borden. Historians credit him with creating and financing a modernised Canadian militia with a staff and medical, transport, and signals that proved important for allowing Canadian ground forces to deploy with their own support services as self-contained national contingents, albeit in an imperial framework. In this sense, he helped to create the foundations for the Canadian Expeditionary Force of 1914–1918.

== Career ==
Born in Cornwallis, Nova Scotia, the son of Dr. Jonathan Borden and Maria Frances Brown. Borden received a Bachelor of Arts degree from University of King's College in Windsor, Nova Scotia in 1866. He joined the militia as a cadet at King's College and then as an assistant surgeon in the 68th (Kings) Battalion of Infantry in 1869. He earned a M.D. in 1868 from Harvard Medical School and practiced as a physician in Canning, Nova Scotia. Borden soon added business to his medical practice, acting as a bank agent, buying real estate, ships and helping found the successful Cornwallis Valley Railway from Canning to Kentville in 1887. He formed his own company the F. W. Borden Company in 1895, later known as the Nova Scotia Produce and Supply Company, to oversee his various business ventures in agriculture, lumber, shipping and investment.

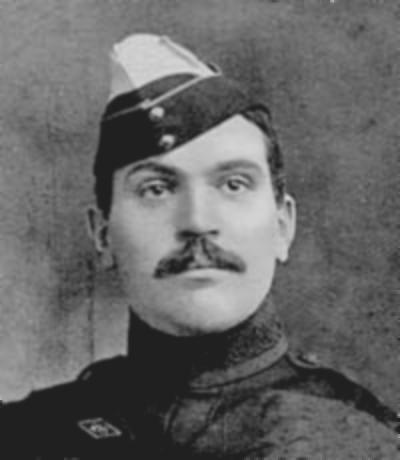
While Sir Frederick Borden was the Minister of Defence, his only son Harold was killed in action in the Boer War

He entered politics in 1874 with election as a Liberal member from Kings (Nova Scotia federal electoral district); aside from an interruption 1882–1887, he represented this constituency until 1911.

== Minister of Militia and Defence ==
As Minister of Militia and Defence from 1896 to 1911, Borden implemented a series of reforms that gave the militia the ability to act as a formed army with its own supply and medical services. He also increased the rate at which Canadian officers attended British and Indian staff colleges at Camberley and Quetta and used these staff-trained graduates to help create professionally-trained staffs at the Royal Military College of Canada, and regional divisional headquarters.

He increased pay and retirement benefits, equipped the militia with modern weapons, established rules regulating tenure of command, and decentralized command and administration. Miller (2010) presents evidence that Borden saved himself from financial ruin by stationing three battalions of soldiers to Halifax in 1900 in order to make a profit for his faltering supply company.

== Honours ==
CFB Borden was named in his honour when the air base was founded in 1916. He is the cousin of the eighth Prime Minister of Canada, Sir Robert Borden.

Following the succession of King Edward VII and the end of the Second Boer War by the Peace of Vereeniging in late May 1902, Borden was created a Knight Commander of the Order of St Michael and St George (KCMG) in the 1902 Coronation Honours list published on 26 June 1902. He attended the fleet review held at Spithead on 16 August 1902 to mark the coronation, and received the order in an investiture on board the royal yacht Victoria and Albert the previous day. He was appointed a Knight of Grace of the Order of the Hospital of Saint John of Jerusalem in England (K.St.J.) on 13 August 1902, and granted the honorary rank of Surgeon-General in the British Army in the 1911 Coronation Honours.

Borden died in Canning in 1917, and is buried in nearby Hillaton Cemetery, His two principal houses survive, the former Stadacona House (now the High Commission of Brunei, Ottawa), and Borden Place, in Canning, which is a National Historic Site.

Parliament of Canada
| Preceded by Leverett de Veber Chipman | Member of Parliament from Kings; 1874–1882 | Succeeded by Douglas Benjamin Woodworth |
| Preceded by Douglas Benjamin Woodworth | Member of Parliament from Kings; 1887–1911 | Succeeded by Arthur de Witt Foster |
