= Robert Borden =

Prime Minister of Canada from 1911 to 1920

The Right Honourable Sir Robert Borden PC GCMG KC
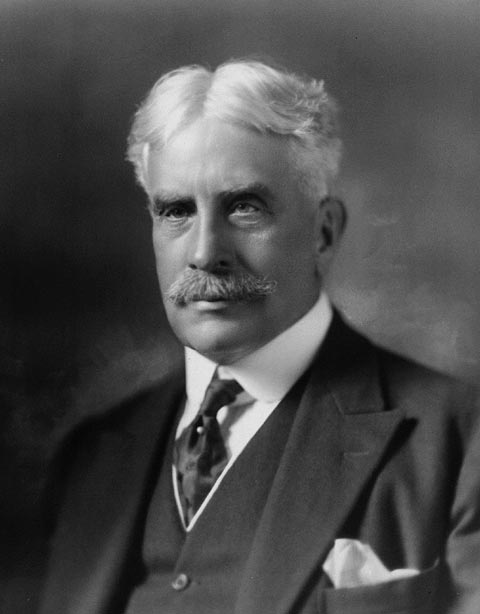
- Borden in 1910

8th Prime Minister of Canada
- In office October 10, 1911 – July 10, 1920
- Monarch: George V
- Governors General: The Earl Grey; The Duke of Connaught; The Duke of Devonshire
- Preceded by: Sir Wilfrid Laurier
- Succeeded by: Arthur Meighen

Leader of the Conservative Party
- In office February 6, 1901 – July 10, 1920
- Preceded by: Charles Tupper
- Succeeded by: Arthur Meighen

Member of Parliament for Kings
- In office December 17, 1917 – July 1920
- Preceded by: Arthur de Witt Foster
- Succeeded by: Ernest William Robinson

Member of Parliament for Carleton
- In office February 4, 1905 – January 25, 1909
- Preceded by: Edward Kidd
- Succeeded by: Edward Kidd

Member of Parliament for Halifax
- In office October 26, 1908 – December 16, 1917
- Preceded by: Michael Carney
- Succeeded by: Peter Francis Martin
- In office June 23, 1896 – November 2, 1904
- Preceded by: John Fitzwilliam Stairs
- Succeeded by: Michael Carney

Personal details
- Born: Robert Laird Borden; June 26, 1854 Grand-Pré, Nova Scotia
- Died: June 10, 1937 (aged 82) Ottawa, Ontario, Canada
- Resting place: Beechwood Cemetery, Ottawa, Ontario
- Party: Liberal (until 1886); Conservative (after 1886; until 1917, 1922–1937); Unionist (1917–1922)
- Spouse: Laura Bond (m. 1889)
- Robert Borden's voice Robert Borden being interviewed on July 23rd, 1936, less than a year before his death.

Sir Robert Laird Borden (June 26, 1854 – June 10, 1937) was a Canadian lawyer and politician who served as the eighth prime minister of Canada from 1911 to 1920. He is best known for his leadership of Canada during World War I.

Borden was born in Grand-Pré, Nova Scotia. He worked as a schoolteacher for a period and then served his articles of clerkship at a Halifax law firm. He was called to the bar in 1878 and soon became one of Nova Scotia's most prominent barristers. Borden was elected to the House of Commons in the 1896 federal election, representing the Conservative Party. He replaced Charles Tupper as party leader in 1901, but was defeated in two federal elections by Liberal Prime Minister Sir Wilfrid Laurier in 1904 and 1908. However, in the 1911 federal election, Borden led the Conservatives to victory, on the basis that the Liberals' proposed trade reciprocity treaty with the United States would lead to the U.S. influencing Canadian identity and weaken ties with Great Britain.

Borden's early years as prime minister focused on strengthening relations with Britain. Within three years of taking office, World War I broke out. To support the war effort, he established the Canadian Expeditionary Force and enacted the War Measures Act, which granted the government sweeping powers. To finance the conflict, his government issued victory bonds, raised tariffs, and introduced new taxes, including the federal income tax. In 1917, facing what he believed to be a shortage in Canadian soldiers, Borden introduced conscription, which caused significant controversy in French Canada and ignited the Conscription Crisis. Despite this, his Unionist Party, a coalition of Conservatives and pro-conscription Liberals, was elected with an overwhelming majority in the 1917 federal election. After the war, Borden sought to expand the autonomy of Canada and other Dominions at the Paris Peace Conference, including by signing the Treaty of Versailles as independent parties. In doing so, Canada established itself as a founding member of the League of Nations. Domestically, Borden's government dealt with the aftermath of the Halifax Explosion, introduced women's suffrage in federal elections, nationalized railways by establishing the Canadian National Railway, and deployed the North-West Mounted Police to suppress the 1919 Winnipeg general strike.

Borden retired from politics in 1920. In his retirement, he was Chancellor of Queen's University from 1924 to 1930 and was president of two financial institutions, the Barclays Bank of Canada and the Crown Life Insurance Company, from 1928 until his death in 1937. Borden places above-average among historians and the public in rankings of prime ministers of Canada. He was the last prime minister born before Confederation and the last prime minister to be knighted, having accepted a knighthood in 1914.

== Early life and career (1854–1874) ==
Borden was born and educated in Grand-Pré, Nova Scotia, a farming community at the eastern end of the Annapolis Valley. His great-grandfather, Perry Borden Sr. of Tiverton, Rhode Island, had taken up Acadian land in this region in 1760 as one of the New England Planters. The Borden family had immigrated from Headcorn, Kent, England, to New England in the 17th century. Also arriving in this group was a great-great-grandfather, Robert Denison, who had come from Connecticut at about the same time. Perry had accompanied his father, Samuel Borden, the chief surveyor chosen by the government of Massachusetts to survey the former Acadian land and draw up new lots for the Planters in Nova Scotia. Through the marriage of his patrilineal ancestor Richard Borden to Innocent Cornell, Borden is descendant from Thomas Cornell of Portsmouth, Rhode Island.

Borden's father, Andrew Borden, was judged by his son to be "a man of good ability and excellent judgement" and of a "calm, contemplative and philosophical" turn of mind, but "he lacked energy and had no great aptitude for affairs." His mother Eunice Jane Laird was more driven, possessing "very strong character, remarkable energy, high ambition and unusual ability". Her ambition was transmitted to her first-born child, who applied himself to his studies while assisting his parents with the farm work he found so disagreeable. Borden's cousin, Sir Frederick Borden, was a prominent Liberal politician.

At age nine, Borden became a day student for the local private academy, Acacia Villa School. The school sought to "fit boys physically, morally, and intellectually, for the responsibilities of life." There, Borden developed an interest in the Greek, Latin, and Hebrew languages. At age 14, Borden became the assistant master for classical studies. In late 1873, Borden began working as a professor for classics and mathematics at the Glenwood Institute in Matawan, New Jersey. Seeing no future in teaching, he returned to Nova Scotia in 1874.

== Lawyer (1874–1896) ==
Despite having no formal university education, Borden went to serve his articles of clerkship for four years at a Halifax law firm. Borden also attended the School of Military Instruction in the city during the winter of 1878. In August 1878, Borden was called to the Nova Scotia Bar, placing first in the bar examinations. He went to Kentville, Nova Scotia, as the junior partner of the Conservative lawyer John P. Chipman. In 1880, Borden was inducted into the Freemasons St Andrew's lodge No. 1. In 1882, Borden, despite being a Liberal, accepted Wallace Graham's request to move to Halifax and join the Conservative law firm headed by Graham and Charles Hibbert Tupper. In 1886, Borden broke with the Liberal Party after he disagreed with Premier William Stevens Fielding's campaign to withdraw Nova Scotia from Confederation. In the autumn of 1889, when he was only 35, Borden became the senior partner following the departure of Graham and Tupper for the bench and politics, respectively.

His financial future guaranteed, on September 25, 1889, Borden married Laura Bond, the daughter of a Halifax hardware merchant. Ms. Bond was an organist and regular attendant of St. Paul's Anglican Church in Halifax, and it has been speculated that the pair first met there. They had no children. Bond later became president of the Local Council of Women of Halifax, until her resignation in 1901. She also later became president of the Aberdeen Association, vice-president of the Women's Work Exchange in Halifax, and corresponding secretary of the Associated Charities of the United States. The Bordens spent several weeks vacationing in England and Europe in the summers of 1891 and 1893. In 1894, Borden bought a large property and home on the south side of Quinpool Road, which the couple called Pinehurst.

In 1893, Borden successfully argued the first of two cases which he took to the Judicial Committee of the Privy Council. He represented many of the important Halifax businesses and sat on the boards of Nova Scotian companies, including the Bank of Nova Scotia and the Crown Life Insurance Company. By the mid-1890s, Borden's firm was so prominent that it attracted notable clients, such as the Bank of Nova Scotia, Canada Atlantic Steamship, and the Nova Scotia Telephone Company. Borden had several court cases in Ottawa, and while in that city he frequently met with Prime Minister John Sparrow David Thompson, a fellow Nova Scotian. In 1896, Borden became president of the Nova Scotia Barristers' Society and took the initiative in organizing the founding meetings of the Canadian Bar Association in Montreal.

On April 27, 1896, Borden went to Charles Tupper's home for a dinner party. Tupper, who was about to succeed Mackenzie Bowell as prime minister, asked Borden to run for the federal electoral district of Halifax for the upcoming election. Borden accepted the request.

== Early political career (1896–1901) ==
Campaigning in favour of his party's National Policy, Borden was elected as a member of Parliament (MP) in the 1896 federal election as a Conservative. However, the Conservative Party as a whole was defeated by the Liberals led by Wilfrid Laurier.

Though an MP in Ottawa, Borden still practised law back in Halifax. He also remained loyal to Tupper. Borden participated in many House committees and over time emerged as a key figure in the party.

== Leader of the Official Opposition (1901–1911) ==
Tupper announced his resignation as party leader after he led the Conservatives to their second consecutive defeat at the polls in 1900. Tupper, and his son Charles Hibbert Tupper (who was Borden's former colleague at the Halifax law firm) asked Borden to become leader, citing his work in Parliament and lack of enemies within the Conservative caucus. Borden at first was not keen to become leader, stating, "I have not either the experience or the qualifications which would enable me to successfully lead the party...It would be an absurdity for the party and madness for me." However, he later changed his position and on February 6, 1901, he was selected by the Conservative caucus as party leader.

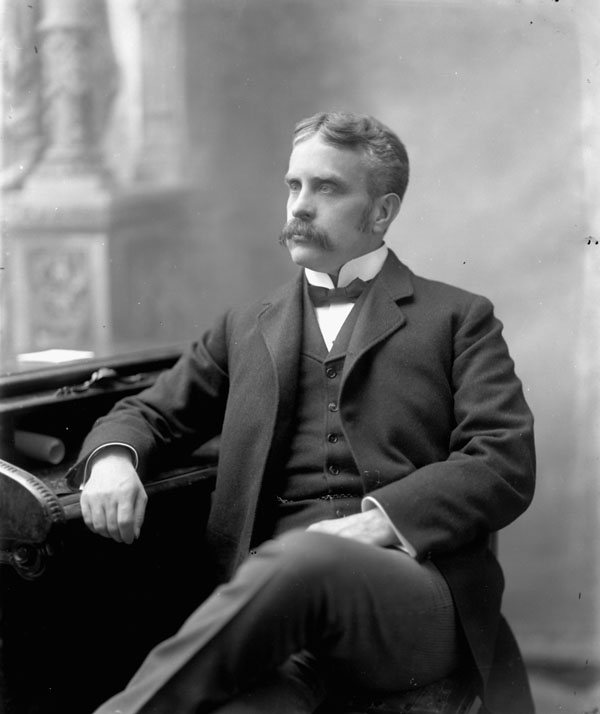
Borden, 1901

The Liberal prime minister, Wilfrid Laurier, proposed the building of the Canadian Northern and Grand Trunk railways. Borden proposed for the railways to be government-owned and government-operated, stating the people would have a choice between "a government-owned railway or a railway-owned government." This position did not resonate with voters in the 1904 federal election; the Liberals won a slightly stronger majority, while the Conservatives lost a few seats. Borden himself was defeated in his Halifax seat but re-entered the House of Commons the next year via a by-election in Carleton (Ontario). In 1907, Borden announced the Halifax Platform. The Conservative Party's new policy called for reform of the Senate and the civil service, a more selective immigration policy, free rural mail delivery, government regulation of telegraphs, telephones, and railways and eventually national ownership of telegraphs and telephones. In the 1908 federal election, Laurier's Liberals won for the fourth consecutive time. However, the Liberals experienced a drop in support as they won a slightly reduced majority. The Conservatives experienced a modest boost, gaining 10 seats.

In 1910 and 1911, Laurier proposed a reciprocity agreement with the United States. Borden opposed the treaty, stating that it would weaken ties with Britain, lead to Canadian identity being influenced by the US, and lead to American annexation of Canada. In the 1911 federal election, the Conservatives countered with a revised version of John A. Macdonald's National Policy, campaigned on fears of American influence on Canada and disloyalty to Britain, and ran on the slogan "Canadianism or Continentalism". The Conservatives triumphed; they won a strong majority, ending over 15 years of Liberal rule.

== Prime Minister (1911–1920) ==
=== Pre-war Canada ===
To aid the farmers who would have benefited had the reciprocity treaty been implemented, Borden's government passed the Canada Grain Act of 1912 to establish a board of grain commissioners that would supervise grain inspection and regulate the grain trade. This law would also allow the federal government to build or acquire and operate grain elevators at key points in the grain marketing and export system.

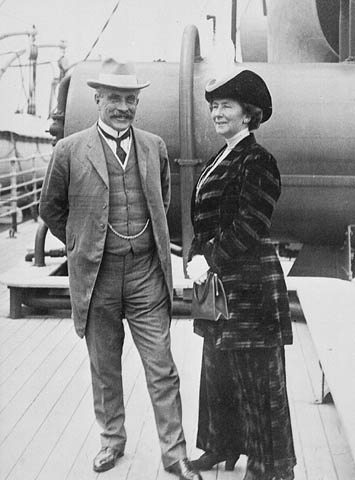
Robert and Mrs. Borden in 1912, before he was knighted

Also in 1912, the provinces of Manitoba, Ontario, and Quebec were expanded through the Manitoba Boundaries Extension Act, the Ontario Boundaries Extension Act, and the Quebec Boundaries Extension Act. These three provinces would take up the southern portion of the Northwest Territories.

In 1912 and 1913, Borden's government sought to pass the Naval Aid Bill, which would have sent $35 million for the construction of three dreadnoughts for the British Navy. Laurier, now Opposition leader, argued that the bill would threaten Canadian autonomy. In May 1913, the bill was blocked by the Liberal-controlled Senate.

On June 22, 1914, Borden was knighted; King George V appointed him a knight grand cross of the Order of St Michael and St George. He was the last Canadian prime minister to receive a knighthood.

=== First World War ===
In late July, Borden and his wife, Laura, went for a vacation to the Muskoka District Municipality. However, the trip was cut short after World War I broke out in Europe. On July 31, the Bordens were on a train for Toronto. The next day, he returned to Ottawa. The British declaration of war on August 4, 1914, automatically brought Canada into the war.

==== Major reforms ====
On August 22, 1914, Parliament passed the controversial War Measures Act (with support from both Conservatives and Liberals), which gave the government extraordinary and emergency powers, including the right to censor and suppress communications, the right to arrest, detain, and deport people without charges or trials, the right to control transportation, trade and manufacturing, and the right to seize private property during times of "war, invasion or insurrection". The act also allowed Borden to govern by order in council, meaning that Cabinet was allowed to implement pieces of legislation without the need for a vote in the House of Commons and Senate.

Borden's government created the Canadian Patriotic Fund to give financial and social assistance to the families of soldiers. The government also raised tariffs on some high-demand consumer items to boost the economy.

In 1916, Borden's government established the National Research Council Canada for scientific and industrial research. In 1918, to gain information on Canada's population, social structure, and economy, the government established the Dominion Bureau of Statistics through the Statistics Act. It was renamed Statistics Canada in 1971.

Borden's government set up the Canadian Expeditionary Force (CEF). The force posted several combat formations of the Western Front during the war. In December 1914, Borden stated, "there has not been, there will not be, compulsion or conscription." As the war dragged on, more troops for the CEF were deployed through the voluntary force. In July 1915, the number of CEF soldiers increased to 150,000 before being increased to 250,000 in October 1915 before doubling to 500,000 in January 1916. By mid-1916, the rate of volunteers enlisting started to slow down.

==== Economy ====
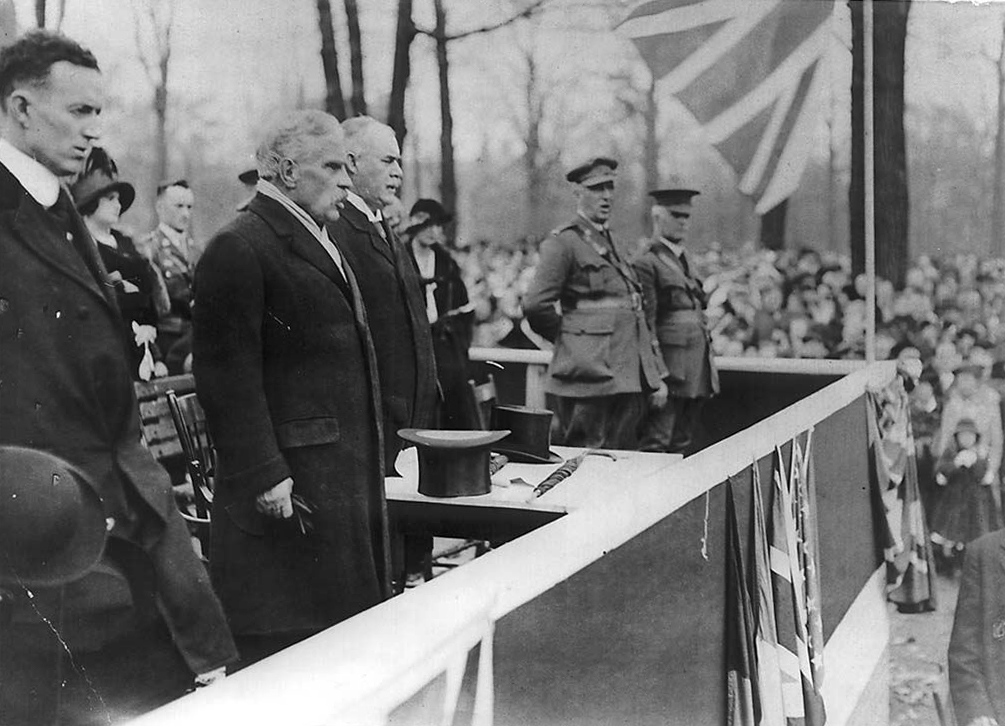
Borden opening a Victory Bond campaign in Toronto, 1915

Despite the threat of an economic collapse and the need for more revenue to fund the war effort, Borden's finance minister, William Thomas White, rejected calls for direct taxation on Canadian citizens in 1914, though this position would be shortly reversed. White cited his beliefs that taxation would cost too much to implement and would interfere with provincial taxation systems. Borden and White instead opted for "business as usual" with Britain by assuming that the country would cover the costs incurred by Canada. However, at the end of 1914, Britain was not able to lend money to Canada due to their own economic priorities. By 1917, Britain had become unable to pay for wartime shipments from Canada. During the war, Canada drastically increased imports of specialized metals and machinery needed for production of ammunition from the United States. This led Borden and White to successfully negotiate a $50 million loan in New York City in 1915. Canada also succeeded in negotiating larger bond issues in New York in 1916 and 1917. In 1918, a Victory Bond of $300 million brought in $660 million. Overall, Victory Bond campaigns raised around $2 billion. American investment in Canada significantly increased whereas British investment declined. By 1918, imports of goods from the United States were 1,000 percent of British exports to Canada.

In 1915, 1916, and 1917, Borden's government began to reverse their anti-taxation position, not least because of the need for more government revenue. The government introducing wartime savings bonds and raising import tariffs was not enough. In 1915, a luxury tax on tobacco and alcohol and taxes on transport tickets, telegrams, money orders, cheques, and patent medicines were introduced. By the end of the war, staple items were taxed. In a politically motivated move in 1916, the government introduced the Business Profits War Tax to address increasing concerns about businesses practising war profiteering. The tax expired in 1920 but was brought back in the Second World War.

In 1917, Borden's government introduced the income tax which came into effect on September 20, 1917. The tax exempted the first $1,500 of income for single people (unmarried persons and widows and widowers without dependent children); the tax exempted the first $3,000 for everyone else. Single people were taxed at four percent while the tax rate ranged from two to 22 percent for married Canadians with dependents and an annual income over $6,000. Due to its several exemptions, only two to eight percent of Canadians filed tax returns during the early days of the income tax. When the war ended in 1918, $8 million in income tax revenue had been recorded, which was a small fraction of the national net debt of $1.6 billion. Though Borden's government declared the income tax to be temporary, it has remained in place ever since.

In 1917, facing skyrocketing prices, Borden's government established the Board of Grain Supervisors of Canada to distance the marketing of crops grown in 1917 and 1918 away from the private grain companies. It was succeeded by the Canadian Wheat Board for the 1919 crop. The board was dissolved in 1920, despite the concept being popular among farm organizations.

==== Conscription, Unionist Party, and 1917 election ====
In Spring 1917, Borden visited Europe and attended the Imperial Conference. There, he participated in discussions that included possible peace terms and helped spearhead the passage of Resolution IX which called for a post-war constitutional conference to "provide effective arrangements for continuous consultation in all important matters of common Imperial concern, and for such necessary concerted action, founded on consultation, as the several Governments may determine." He also assured leaders of the Allied countries that Canada was committed to the war. Also during his trip, Borden made visits to the hospital to meet wounded and shell shocked soldiers and became determined that the soldiers' sacrifices should not be in vain, and that therefore, the war must end. With volunteer enlistment slowing down, Borden believed that the war should finish through only one method: conscription. Reversing their pledge to not introduce the policy, Borden's government passed the Military Service Act to introduce conscription. The act became law on August 29, 1917.

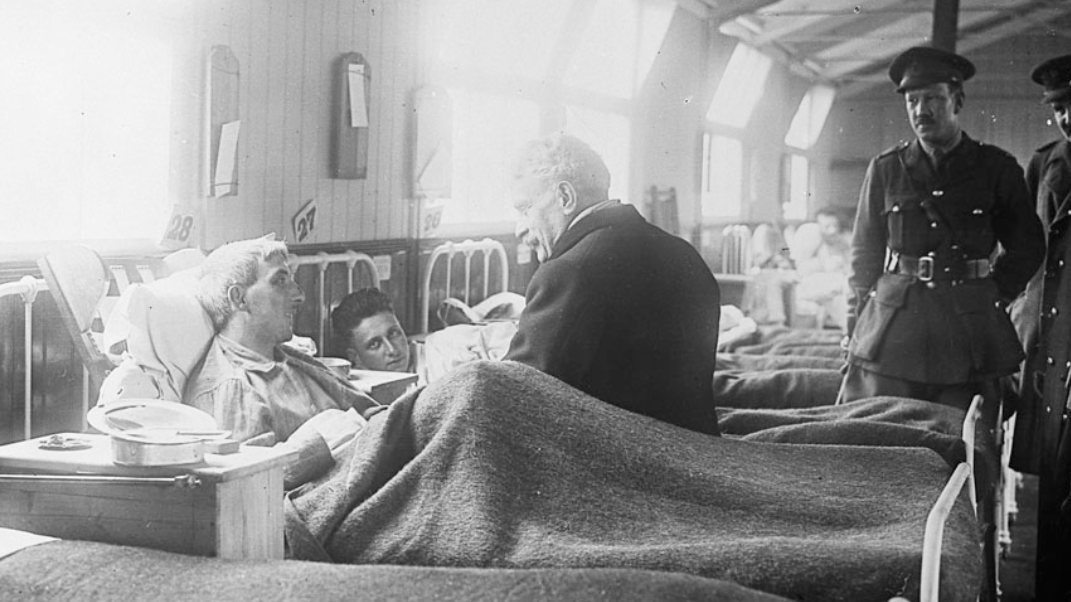
Borden speaking to wounded soldiers at a hospital in the Western Front, March 1917

The disputes over conscription triggered the Conscription Crisis of 1917; most English Canadians supported the policy whereas most French Canadians opposed it, as seen by protests in Quebec. In a bid to settle Quebec opposition towards the policy, Borden proposed forming a wartime coalition government composed of both Conservatives and Liberals. Despite Borden offering the Liberals equal seats in the Cabinet in exchange for Liberal support for conscription, the proposal was rejected by Liberal leader Laurier. In October, Borden formed the Unionist Party, a coalition of Conservatives and pro-conscription Liberals (known as Liberal–Unionists). Laurier, maintaining his anti-conscription position, refused to join the Unionist government and instead created the "Laurier Liberals", a party of Liberals opposed to conscription.

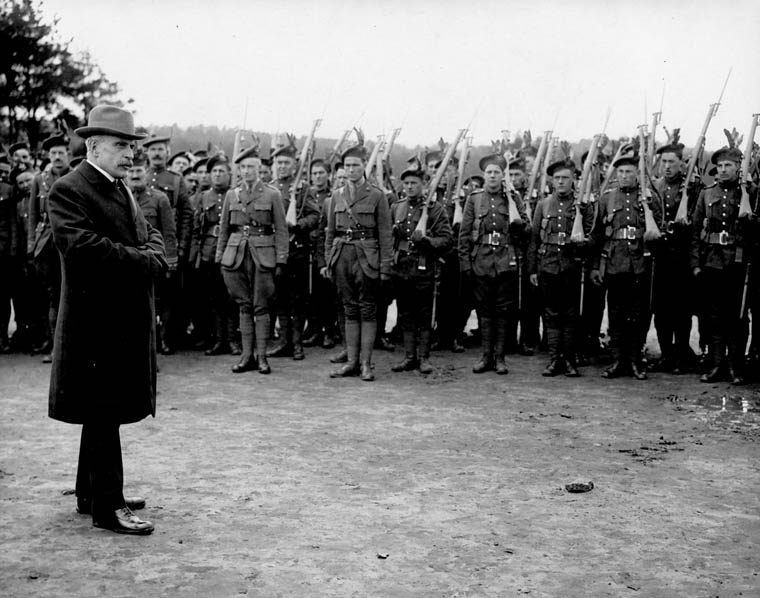
Borden addressing troops in England, April 1917

The 1917 federal election was held on December 17. The election was Canada's first in six years; it was supposed to be held in 1916 due to the constitutional requirement that Parliament last no longer than five years, but was delayed by one year due to the war. Months before the election was called, Borden's government introduced the Military Voters Act that allowed all 400,000 conscripted Canadian soldiers — including those who were underage and born in Britain, to vote. The act also allowed current and former Indigenous veterans to vote. In addition, the Wartime Elections Act allowed female relatives of soldiers (excluding Indigenous women) to vote. However, this law confiscated voting rights from German and Austrian immigrants (i.e. immigrants from "enemy nations") who moved to Canada during and after 1902 as well as those who exempted from the coming conscription draft, including conscientious objectors. Some believe that these laws put the Unionists in a favourable position.

The Unionist election campaign criticized French Canada for its low enlistment rate to fight in the war. Fearing the possible event of a Liberal victory, one of the Unionist pamphlets highlighted ethnic differences, stating, "the French Canadians who have shirked their duty in this war will be the dominating force in the government of this country. Are the English-speaking people prepared to stand for that?"

The Unionist campaign was an overwhelming success; the government won a powerful majority (114 Conservatives and 39 Liberals), won the highest share of the popular vote in Canadian history, and won the largest percentage of seats in Canadian history at the time (at 65.1%). The Liberals on the other hand lost seats and won their smallest share of the popular vote since the 1882 federal election. The election revealed ethnic divides in the country; the Conservatives won over English Canadians whereas the Liberals swept French-Canadian-dominated Quebec.

The process of conscripting soldiers began in January 1918. Only 124,588 out of the 401,882 men who registered for conscription were drafted and only 24,132 actually fought in Europe. By spring 1918, the government removed certain exemptions. To suppress the anti-conscription "Easter Riots" that occurred in Quebec City between March 28 and April 1, Borden's government used the War Measures Act, invoked martial law, and deployed more than 6,000 troops. The troops and rioters exchanged gunfire, resulting in four civilian deaths and as many as 150 casualties.

==== Ukrainian Canadian internment ====
Between 1914 and 1920, more than 8,500 Ukrainian Canadians were interned under the measures of the War Measures Act in spite of British advice against the move. Some immigrated from the Central Powers countries of the German Empire, Austria-Hungary, and the Ottoman Empire. The internees faced intense labour; they worked in the national parks of Western Canada, built roads, cleared bush, and cut trails. They also had their personal wealth and property confiscated and never returned by the Borden government. Overall, 107 internees died. Six were shot dead while trying to escape and others died from disease, work-related injuries, and suicide.

Another 80,000 Ukrainian Canadians were not imprisoned but were registered as "enemy aliens" and were compelled to report regularly to the police. Their freedom of speech, movement, and association were also restricted.

=== Borden and the Treaty of Versailles ===
Throughout the war, Borden stressed the need for Canada to participate in British decisions; in a January 1916 letter to the High Commissioner of Canada in the United Kingdom, George Perley, Borden wrote:

"It can hardly be expected that we shall put 400,000 or 500,000 men in the field and willingly accept the position of having no more voice and receiving no more consideration than if we were toy automata."

On October 27, 1918, British Prime Minister David Lloyd George requested Borden to visit Britain for possible peace talks. Borden replied stating, "the press and the people of this country take it for granted that Canada will be represented at the Peace Conference." World War I ended shortly after on November 11, 1918. Borden told his wife, Laura, that "Canada got nothing out of the war except recognition."

Borden attended the 1919 Paris Peace Conference, though boycotted the opening ceremony, protesting at the precedence given to William Lloyd, the prime minister of the much smaller Newfoundland, over Borden. Convinced that Canada had become a nation on the battlefields of Europe, Borden demanded that it have a separate seat at the Conference. This was initially opposed not only by Britain but also by the United States, which perceived such a delegation as an extra British vote. Borden responded by pointing out that since Canada had lost a far larger proportion of its men compared to the US in the war (although not more in absolute numbers), Canada at least had the right to the representation of a "minor" power. Lloyd George eventually relented, and convinced the reluctant Americans to accept the presence of separate Canadian, Indian, Australian, Newfoundland, New Zealand and South African delegations. Not only did Borden's persistence allow him to represent Canada in Paris as a nation, it also ensured that each of the dominions could sign the Treaty of Versailles in its own right and receive a separate membership in the League of Nations. Also during the conference, Borden tried to act as an intermediary between the United States and other members of the British Empire delegation, particularly Australia and New Zealand over the issue of the League of Nations Mandate. Borden also discussed with Lloyd George the possibility of Canada taking over the West Indies but no agreement was reached.

On May 6, 1919, Borden issued a memorandum calling for Canada, as a member, to have the right to be elected to the League's council. This proposal was accepted by Lloyd George, U.S. President Woodrow Wilson, and French Prime Minister Georges Clemenceau. These three leaders also included Canada's right to contest for election to the governing body of the International Labour Organization. Borden departed Paris on May 11; his Cabinet ministers Charles Doherty and Arthur Sifton signed the Treaty of Versailles on his behalf.

=== Domestic policies and post-war Canada ===
==== Halifax Explosion ====
Eleven days before Canadians went to the polls in the 1917 election, Canada experienced the largest domestic disaster in its history: the Halifax Explosion that killed nearly 1,800 people. The tragedy occurring in his own hometown, Borden pledged that the government would be "co-operating in every way to reconstruct the Port of Halifax: this was of utmost importance to the Empire". Borden helped set up the Halifax Relief Commission that spent $30 million on medical care, repairing infrastructure, and establishing pensions for injured survivors.

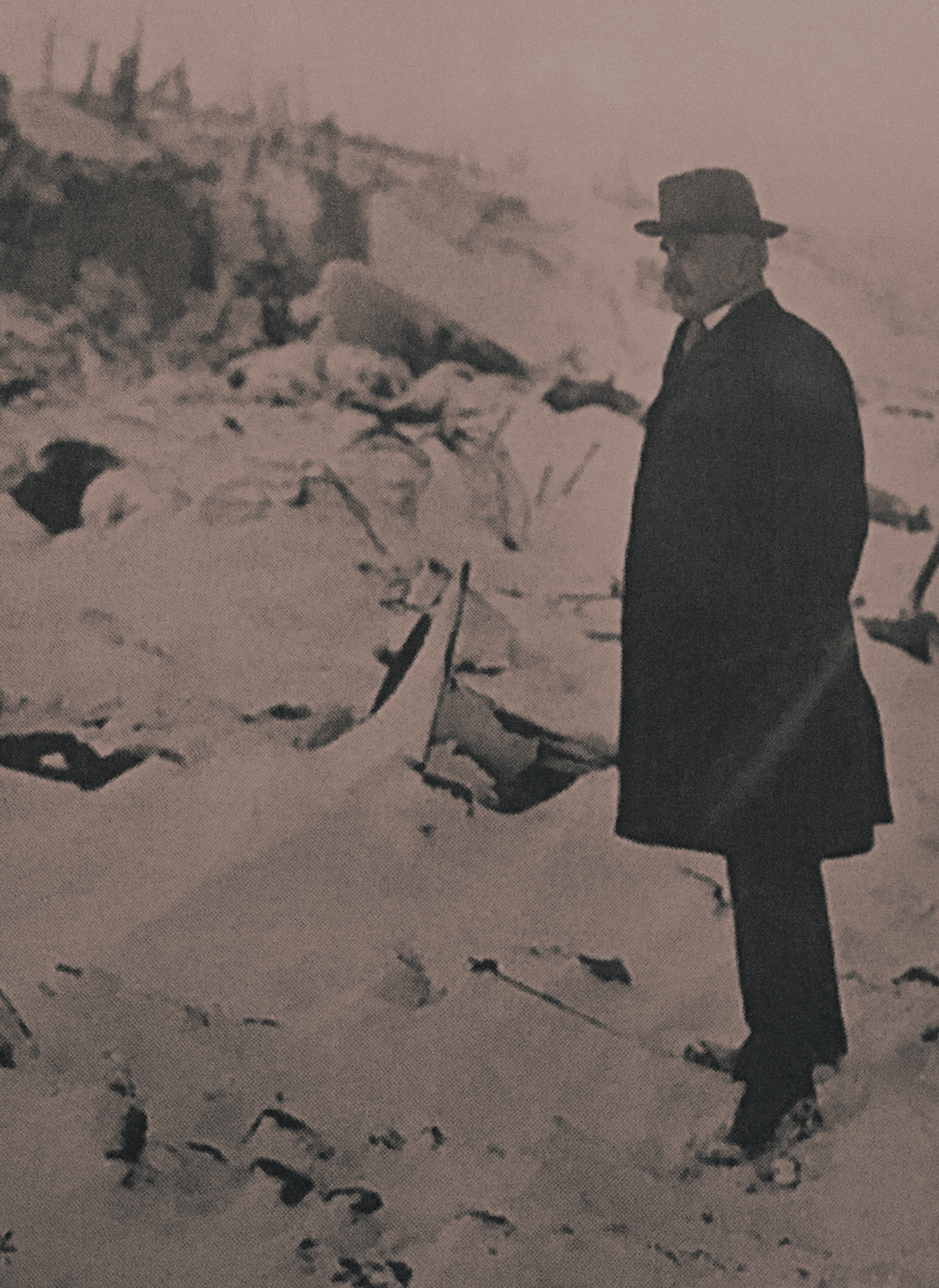
Borden surveying the ruins of the Halifax Explosion

==== Women's suffrage ====
On May 24, 1918, female citizens 21 and over were granted the right to vote in federal elections. In 1920, Borden's government passed the Dominion Elections Act to allow women to run for the Parliament of Canada. However, these two laws prevented or discouraged Asian Canadian and Indigenous Canadian women and men from voting.

==== Nickle Resolution ====
Despite being knighted himself, Borden disapproved of the process by which Canadians were nominated for honours and in March 1917 drafted a policy stating that all names had to be vetted by the prime minister before the list was sent to Westminster. In mid-1917, Borden agreed with MP William Folger Nickle's proposal to abolish Hereditary titles in Canada. In addition to the abolition of the Hereditary titles, it was later learned that with the exception of military distinctions, honours would not be granted to residents of Canada without the approval or the advice of the Canadian prime minister.

==== Nationalization of railways ====
On June 6, 1919, through an order in council, Borden's government established the Canadian National Railways (CN) as a Crown Corporation. The organization originally consisted of four railways: the Intercolonial Railway, the Canadian Northern Railway, the National Transcontinental Railway, and the Grand Trunk Pacific Railway. In January 1923, a fifth one was added: the Grand Trunk Railway. All five of these railways were financially struggling as a result of their inability to borrow from banks (mainly British) during the First World War.

==== 1919 Winnipeg general strike ====
After the war, the working class experienced economic hardship. In a bid to address this problem, construction and metal trades workers in Winnipeg, Manitoba, sought better wages and better working conditions by negotiating with their managers. In May 1919, as a result of talks between the workers and their managers breaking down, several strikes started; on May 15, the Winnipeg Trades and Labor Council (WTLC) called for a general strike as a result of the negotiations collapsing. Within hours of the Winnipeg general strike breaking out, nearly 30,000 workers resigned.

Afraid that the strike would spark conflicts in other cities, Borden's government intervened. His Cabinet ministers Arthur Meighen and Gideon Robertson met with the anti-strike Citizens’ Committee but refused to meet with the pro-strike Central Strike Committee. Taking the advice of the Citizens' Committee, Borden's government threatened to fire federal workers unless they returned to work immediately. The government also changed the Immigration Act to allow the deportation of British-born immigrants. On June 17, the government arrested 10 leaders of the Central Strike Committee and two members of the trade union, One Big Union. On June 21, Borden's government deployed troops from the North-West Mounted Police (NWMP) to the strike scene to maintain public order. As a result of the protestors beginning to riot, the NWMP charged at the protestors, beat them with clubs, and fired bullets. Two people were killed and the violent incident became known as "Bloody Saturday". Within days, the strike ended.

=== Retirement ===
With his doctors recommending that he should leave politics immediately, Borden told his cabinet on December 16, 1919, that he was going to resign. Some cabinet members begged him to stay in office and take a year-long vacation. Borden took a vacation for an unspecified amount of time and returned to Ottawa in May 1920. Borden announced his retirement to his Unionist caucus on Dominion Day, July 1, 1920. Before he retired, the caucus asked him to choose his successor as leader and prime minister. Borden favoured his Finance Minister William Thomas White. With White refusing, Borden persuaded cabinet minister Arthur Meighen to succeed him. Meighen succeeded Borden on July 10, 1920. Borden retired from politics altogether in that same month.

== After politics (1920–1937) ==
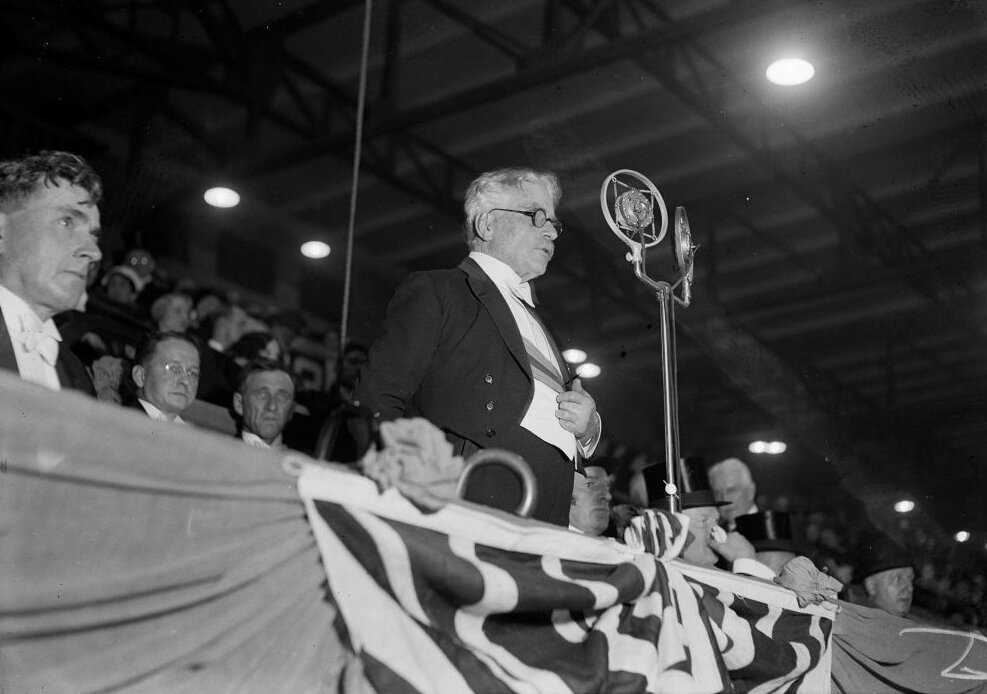
Borden speaking at the Royal Agricultural Winter Fair, 1930

As a delegate, Borden attended the 1921–1922 Washington Naval Conference. Borden was the Chancellor of Queen's University from 1924 to 1930. He was Vice-President of The Champlain Society between 1923 and 1925 and was the Society's first Honorary President between 1925 and 1937. He also was president of the Canadian Historical Association in 1930–31. In 1928 Borden became president of two financial institutions: Barclays Bank of Canada and the Crown Life Insurance Company. In 1932 he became chairman of Canada's first mutual fund, the Canadian Investment Fund. Even after he stepped down as prime minister, Borden kept in touch with Lloyd George; Borden once told him of his retirement, stating, "There is nothing that oppresses me...books, some business avocation, my wild garden, the birds and the flowers, a little golf, and a great deal of life in the open – these together make up the fullness of my days."

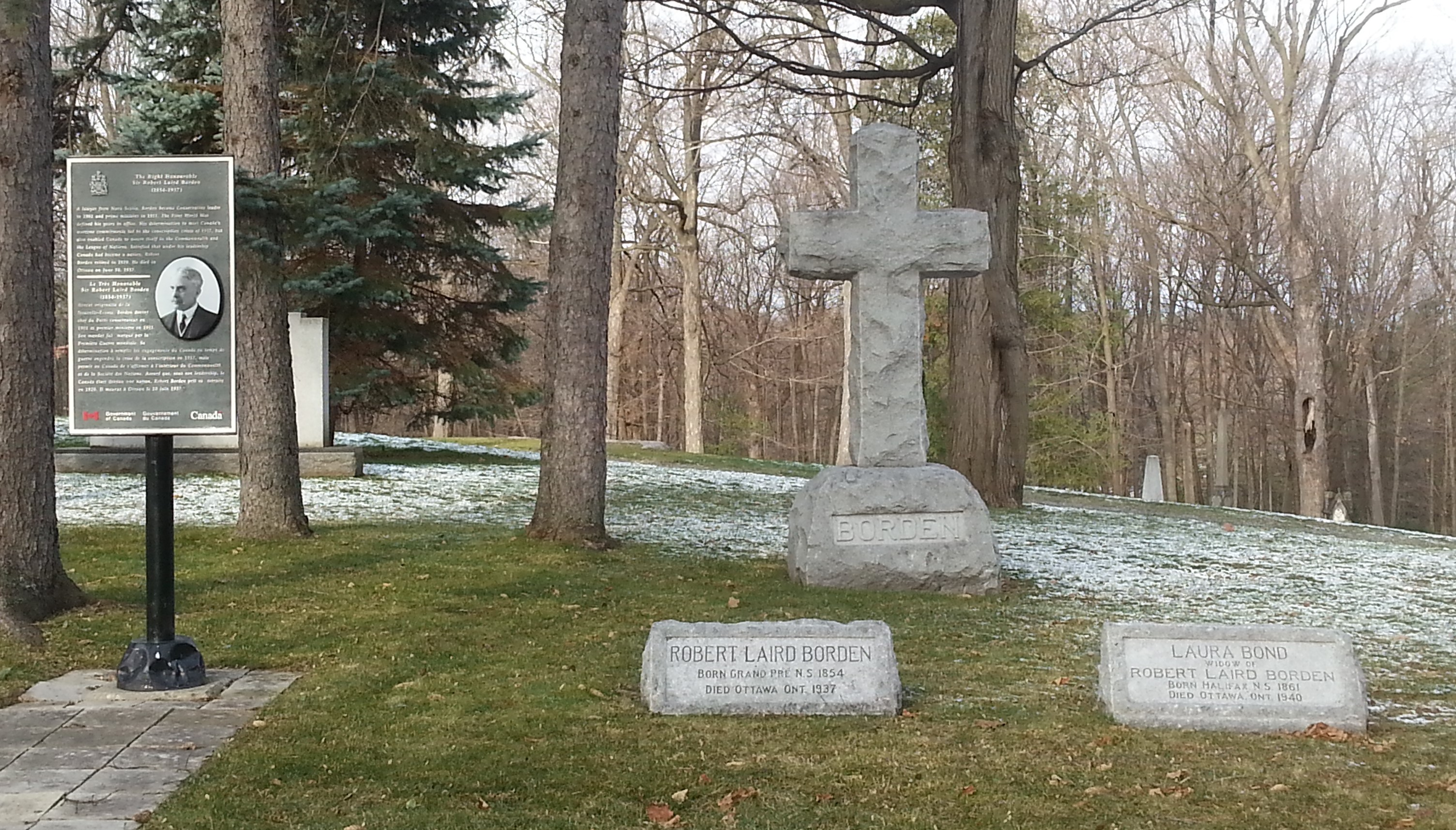
Borden's grave site

Borden died on June 10, 1937, in Ottawa, with the cause of death classified as heart failure.. He is buried in the Beechwood Cemetery marked by a simple stone cross. In his funeral, a thousand World War I veterans lined the procession route.

== Legacy ==
The Borden government's introduction of conscription, new taxes, and use of the North-West Mounted Police to break up the 1919 Winnipeg general strike are all examples of government intervention; with his emphasis on big government, he is remembered as a Red Tory. The Canadian War Museum wrote, "The pressures of war drove Borden’s government to unprecedented levels of involvement in the day-to-day lives of citizens."

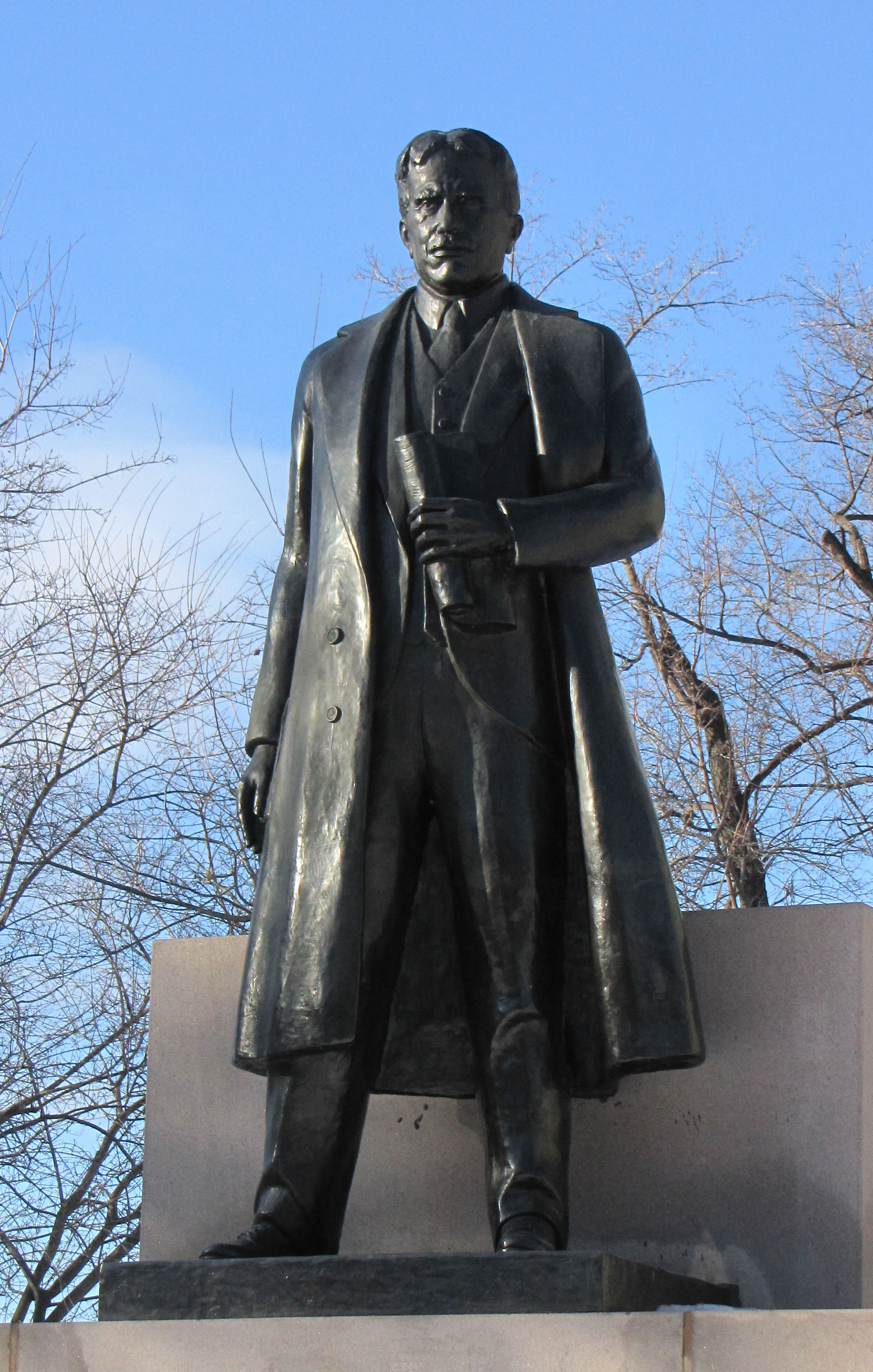
Statue on Parliament Hill, Ottawa

Borden's use of conscription in the war remains controversial. While historian J. L. Granatstein wrote, "Canada's military couldn't have carried on without the controversial policy" and that "[The conscripts] played a critical role in winning the war", he also wrote that "To achieve these ends, he almost broke the nation." In the 1917 federal election, in what was seen as a backlash against Borden and the Unionist Party's pro-conscription position, Quebec voted overwhelmingly in favour of the anti-conscription Laurier Liberals; the Unionists won only three seats. Historian Robert Craig Brown wrote, "The political cost [of conscription] was enormous: the Conservative Party’s support in Quebec was destroyed and would not be recovered for decades to come."

Borden's opposition towards free trade and his government's reversal of a 1917 campaign promise to exempt the sons of farmers from conscription helped the agrarian Progressive Party grow in popularity, which was dissatisfied with Borden's positions on these issues. The Progressive Party was founded by Thomas Crerar, who was Borden's minister of agriculture until 1919, when he resigned over his opposition towards high tariffs and his belief that the government's budget did not pay enough attention to farmer's issues. In the 1921 federal election that saw the Conservatives plummet to third place, the Progressives became the second-largest party and swept Western Canada, a region that Borden's Unionists won over in the election four years previously. As historian Robert Craig Brown notes, "Moreover, Unionist support in western Canada was ephemeral and vanished at the first hints of peace."

In their book Prime Ministers: Ranking Canada's Leaders, J. L. Granatstein and Norman Hillmer include the results of a survey of Canadian historians regarding all the Prime Ministers through Jean Chrétien. Borden was ranked 7th.

== In popular culture ==
Patrick Galligan portrays Borden in episode 17 of season 17 "The Fantastic Mr. Fawkes" (February 19, 2024) and John Ralston portrays Borden in episode 5 of season 19 "The Borden Ultimatum" (November 3, 2025) of the Canadian television period detective series Murdoch Mysteries.

== Honours ==
- Borden was the last Canadian Prime Minister to be knighted (in 1914) since, in deference to the Nickle Resolution, no others have been. However, R. B. Bennett (Prime Minister 1930–35) was created 1st Viscount Bennett after leaving office.
- Borden was honoured by having two secondary schools named after him, in the Nepean part of Ottawa, and in the Scarborough section of Toronto.
- Borden was also honoured by having Sir Robert Borden Junior High School named after him in Cole Harbour, Nova Scotia.
- The town of Borden, Western Australia, was named after him.
- Borden has appeared on the Canadian one-hundred-dollar note since 1975.

== Supreme Court appointments ==
Borden chose the following jurists to sit as justices of the Supreme Court of Canada:

- Louis Henry Davies (as Chief Justice, November 23, 1918 – May 1, 1924; appointed a Puisne Justice under Prime Minister Laurier, September 25, 1901)
- Pierre-Basile Mignault (October 25, 1918 – September 30, 1929)

== See also ==
- List of prime ministers of Canada
- Conscription Crisis of 1917
- Borden Island, named after Borden

== Bibliography ==
By Sir Robert

- Borden, Robert (1971) Letters to Limbo. Toronto; Buffalo, N.Y.: University of Toronto Press ISBN 0-8020-1839-4
- 1938: Borden, Robert (1938). Robert Laird Borden: his memoirs; edited and with an introduction by Henry Borden. 2 vols. (xxii, 1061 p) London: Macmillan
- Canadian Constitutional Studies by Robert Borden at archive.org
- Comments on the Senate's rejection of the Naval Aid Bill by Robert Borden at archive.org

Political offices
Preceded by Charles Tupper	Leader of the Opposition; 1901–1911	Succeeded by Wilfrid Laurier
Preceded by Charles Tupper	Leader of the Conservative Party; 1901–1920	Succeeded by Arthur Meighen
Preceded by Wilfrid Laurier	Prime Minister of Canada; October 10, 1911 – July 10, 1920	Succeeded by Arthur Meighen
Preceded by William James Roche	Secretary of State for External Affairs; 1912–1920	Succeeded by Arthur Meighen
Preceded by Wilfrid Laurier	President of the Privy Council; 1911 – 1917	Succeeded by Newton Rowell
Parliament of Canada
Preceded by John F. Stairs	MP for Halifax, NS; 1896–1904	Succeeded by Michael Carney
Preceded by Edward Kidd	MP for Carleton, ON; 1905–1909	Succeeded by Edward Kidd
Preceded by Michael Carney	MP for Halifax, NS; 1909–1917	Succeeded by Michael A. MacLean
Preceded by Arthur de Witt Foster	MP for Kings, NS; 1917–1921	Succeeded by Ernest William Robinson
Academic offices
Preceded by William Christopher Macdonald	Succeeded by Edward Wentworth Beatty	
Preceded by Edward Wentworth Beatty	Chancellor of Queen's University; 1924–1929	Succeeded by James Armstrong Richardson, Sr.
