= Frederick Henry Sexton =

Canadian engineer and administrator (1879–1955)

Frederic Henry Sexton OBE (June 9, 1879 – January 12, 1955) was a Canadian engineer and higher education administrator.

On April 25, 1907, Sexton was appointed the first Principal of the Nova Scotia Technical College (NSTC) and held the dual posting as the provincial government's Director of Technical Education, in which he oversaw the development of a network of vocational schools to provide technical training across the province. In this capacity, he gave an address on January 11, 1909, to the Canadian Club of Toronto entitled "The Need of a National System of Technical Education".

In 1925, Sexton saw the position of Principal changed to president and he retained this position until his retirement in 1947, following a 40-year career administering NSTC. Upon Sexton's retirement, the administration of the province's technical education program was removed from the President's duties under changes to the Technical College Act.

Throughout his tenure as Principal and President at NSTC, Sexton was heavily involved in numerous organizations in the City of Halifax, including the Education Committee of the Halifax YMCA's Red Triangle Hut, the Maritime Board of the Canadian National Institute for the Blind, the Canadian Institute of Mining and Metallurgy; the Central Advisory Committee of the Carnegie Corporation; the Biological Board of Canada; the Canadian Education Association; the Rotary Club of Canada; the Commission on Highway Dust Prevention; the Halifax Conservatory of Music, and on the Board of Governors of the Nova Scotia Museum of Science from 1948 to 1952. From 1924 to 1927, he served as President of the Victoria School of Art and Design, during which it was renamed to the Nova Scotia College of Art in 1925.

Upon Sexton's retirement in 1947, NSTC alumni raised funds to purchase a new Plymouth automobile, which was presented by Premier Angus L. Macdonald. At the spring convocation, Sexton received an Honorary Doctorate from the Nova Scotia Technical College.

== May Best Sexton ==
Sexton's first wife, Edna May Williston Best (June 25, 1880 – December 14, 1923), graduated from the Massachusetts Institute of Technology in 1902 and was a researcher for General Electric Co. In 1908, she lobbied to establish a Technical Institute for Women, reflecting her commitment to industrial training and gender equality.

She was an officer in the Imperial Order Daughters of the Empire, the Canadian Red Cross Society, and the Local Council of Women of Halifax. She was a well-known suffragette who worked for women to become eligible for technical education and is honoured each year with the "May Best Sexton Memorial Scholarship for Women in Engineering" to demonstrate her value on high academic achievement and community involvement.
