= Technical University of Nova Scotia =

Canadian university

Coordinates: 44°38′33″N 63°34′22″W

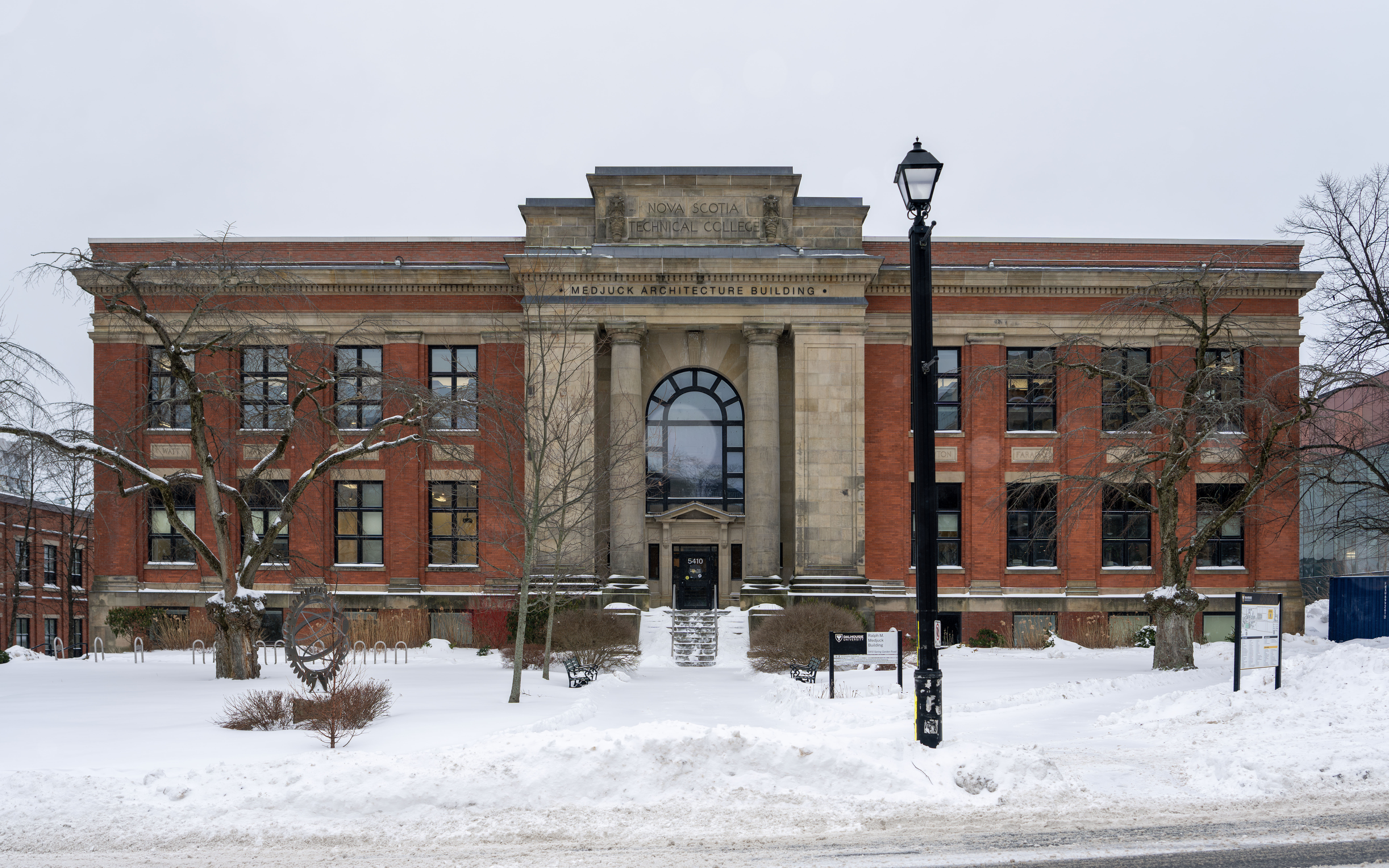
- H Building, completed 1909.
- Former name: Nova Scotia Technical College (1907–1980)
- Active: 1907–1997
- Location: Halifax, Nova Scotia, Canada
- Campus: Urban
- Website: http://www.tuns.ca/ (inactive)

The Technical University of Nova Scotia (TUNS) was a Canadian university located in Halifax, Nova Scotia.

TUNS was officially founded as the Nova Scotia Technical College on 25 April 1907, and was renamed as the Technical University of Nova Scotia in 1980. On 1 April 1997 it was merged into Dalhousie University. The former TUNS campus is now called the Sexton Campus, in honour of Dr. Frederick Sexton, founding principal of the Nova Scotia Technical College.

== History ==
By the early 20th century, Nova Scotia businesses and industries recognized the growing need for technical education in the province, particularly in light of the coal mining and steel manufacturing boom underway in Industrial Cape Breton. Competing engineering diploma programs were established by four universities in the province but no institution could afford the expense of operating a full engineering program. In 1902, Dalhousie University began offering degrees in mining engineering and it established a faculty three years later, but it was too expensive to maintain.

Following an April 19, 1906 meeting between the Halifax Board of Trade, the Mining Society of Nova Scotia, and four provincial universities, it was agree to request that the Government of Nova Scotia establish a degree-granting technical college. The resulting Technical Education Act received Royal Assent on April 25, 1907 and established both the Nova Scotia Technical College (NSTC) as well as a system of local technical education/vocational training schools throughout the province. Dr. Frederick Henry Sexton was appointed Principal.

NSTC started classes in September 1909 in a new building on Spring Garden Road (presently occupied by the Faculty of Architecture and Planning). This property was former military land that had been vacated with the withdrawal of the Royal Navy and British Army from Halifax in 1906; the provision of the land included a requirement that NSTC include military instruction in its curriculum. Compulsory military training at NSTC ended in 1945. Initially NSTC offered programs in civil engineering, electrical engineering, mechanical engineering and mining engineering. In 1947 NSTC began offering chemical engineering and metallurgical engineering. In 1961 the School of Architecture was established (the first and only program in Atlantic Canada). In 1964 NSTC began offering geological engineering followed by industrial engineering in 1965. In 1982 the School of Computer Science was established.

Dr. Sexton served as Principal and Director of Technical Education from 1907 to 1925 when the post was renamed; he continued serving as president from 1925 until 1947. In 1947 the Technical College Act received Royal Assent which removed responsibility for the province's vocational training and education system from the NSTC president. NSTC expanded to include a graduate program, beginning with master's degrees in the 1950s, followed by Doctorate degrees in the 1960s.

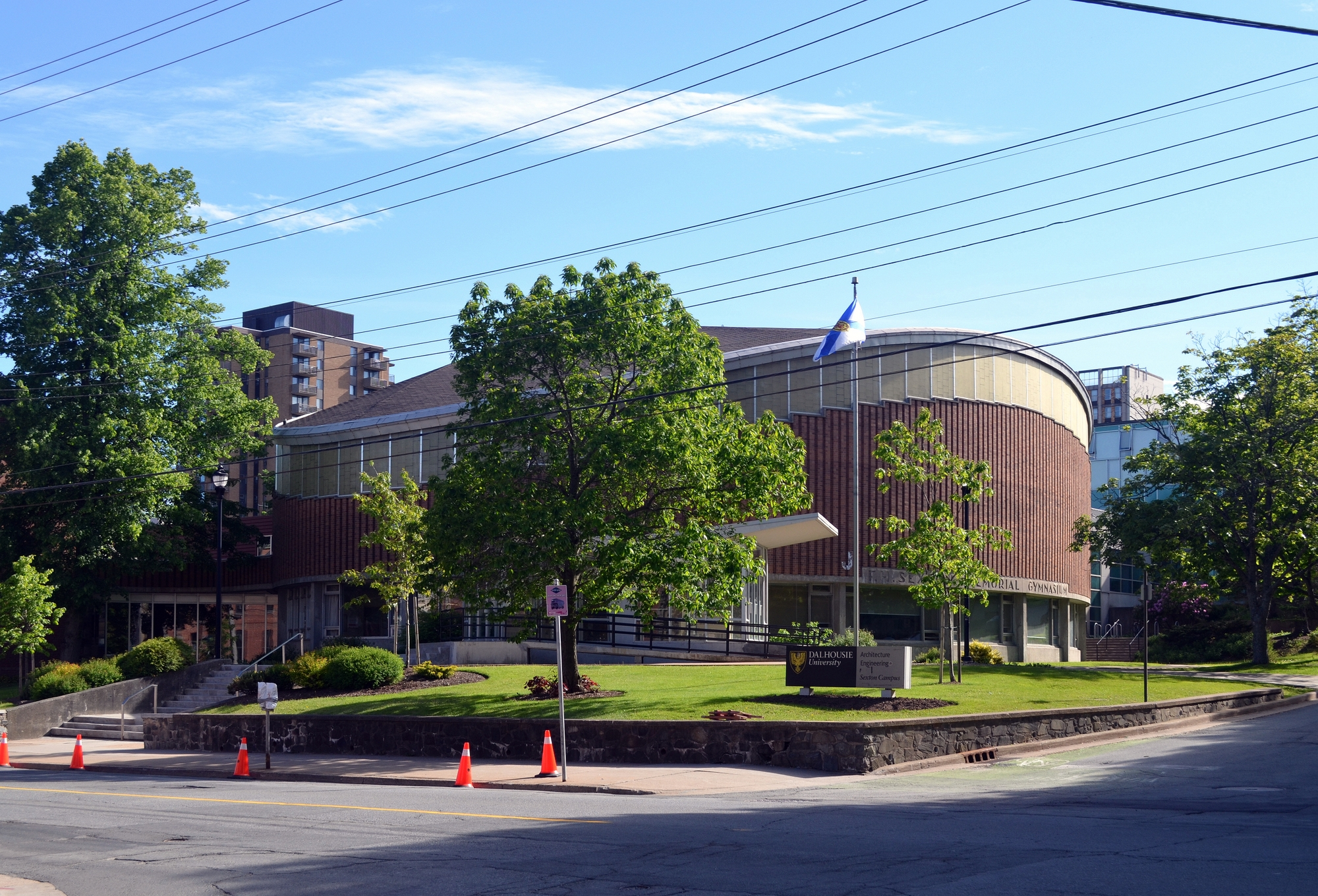
Sexton Gymnasium (J Building), completed 1963

From 1907 until 1963 the Government of Nova Scotia's Department of Education (and its predecessors) was responsible for the direct funding and operation of NSTC. Similarly the government's Department of Public Works was responsible for maintenance of NSTC buildings and construction of new buildings. A revision to the Nova Scotia Technical College Act in 1963 made the NSTC's Board of Governors responsible for financial affairs. In 1965 the maintenance and construction of buildings was transferred to the NSTC. The 1960s-1990s was a period of significant expansion to the college's campus which saw many buildings constructed to encompass much of the block bounded by Spring Garden Road, Barrington Street, Morris Street and the Halifax Infirmary property to the west (along Queen Street).

The Nova Scotia Technical College was frequently being confused by the public with the Nova Scotia Institute of Technology (NSIT) – now part of the Nova Scotia Community College system – and the NSTC abbreviation was often confused by the public with the Nova Scotia Teachers College; there was also identification issues resulting from the institution's name as a "college" when it was offering university-level instruction. On 3 June 1980, following 40 years of lobbying, the Government of Nova Scotia changed the name of the institution to the Technical University of Nova Scotia (TUNS). The mission of TUNS was described as "contribute to the development of Nova Scotia by providing high quality education, research and community and industry collaboration in architecture, computer science and engineering."

== Organisation ==
During the 1990s, TUNS had the following academic units:

- School of Architecture
- School of Computer Science
- School of Engineering
  - Department of Chemical Engineering
  - Department of Civil Engineering
  - Department of Electrical Engineering
  - Department of Food Science and Technology
  - Department of Geological Engineering
  - Department of Industrial Engineering
  - Department of Mechanical Engineering
  - Department of Metallurgical Engineering
  - Department of Mining Engineering
  - Department of Engineering Physics (final graduating class in 1991)
- School of Planning

== Merger into Dalhousie University ==
The provincial government forced TUNS to amalgamate with Dalhousie University in April 1997. For several years the former TUNS faculties formed a separate college called Dalhousie University Polytechnic (nicknamed DalTech) but in 2001 the college structure was dissolved and the faculties simply became part of Dalhousie University.

Today, the TUNS campus is known as the Sexton Campus of Dalhousie University. It includes the Faculty of Engineering and the Faculty of Architecture and Planning. The TUNS School of Computer Science was merged with Dalhousie's Computer Science division (which had previously been a part of the Department of Mathematics, Statistics, and Computer Science) following the 1997 amalgamation to become the Faculty of Computer Science.

In honour of Dr. Sexton, Dalhousie University has named the former TUNS campus the Sexton Campus. There are also two buildings and a prestigious scholarship named after Dr. Sexton.

== See also ==
- T-Room
- TUNS, a Canadian indie supergroup named for the university
