= May Best Sexton =

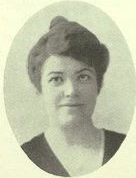
May Best Sexton, Halifax, Nova Scotia

Edna May Williston Sexton (née Best; June 25, 1880 – December 14, 1923) was a social activist and war worker born in Shediac, New Brunswick and died in Halifax, Nova Scotia at age 43.

Best was orphaned at an early age and raised by family in Boston. She obtained an honours science degree from MIT and married another graduate, Frederick Henry Sexton, who became a professor at Dalhousie University in Halifax. As a faculty wife she became fully involved in many organizations they supported, one of the most important being the Imperial Order Daughters of the Empire. She served a term as the first municipal regent. She was aggressively involved in women's issues revolving around education and the roles of women.

Sexton is mainly remembered in Canadian history through her involvement in the war effort. The Local Council of Women of Halifax spearheaded an intense war effort from that city and the whole province and Sexton was a leading force.
