= James Lorimer Ilsley =

Canadian politician (1894–1967)

The Right Honourable James Lorimer Ilsley PC KC
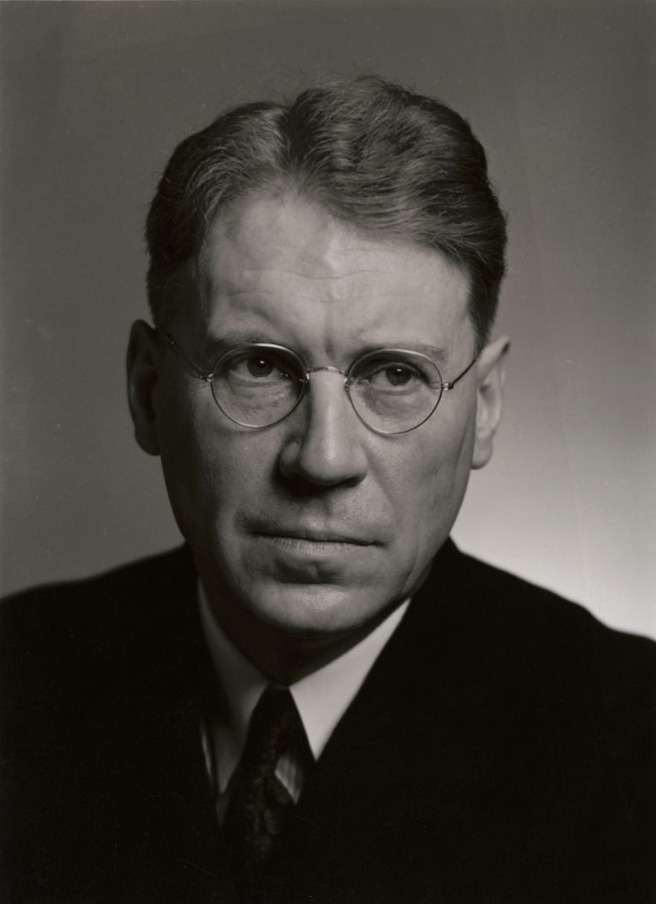
- Ilsley in March 1942

Chief Justice of Nova Scotia
- In office 1950–1967
- Preceded by: Joseph Andrew Chisholm
- Succeeded by: Lauchlin Daniel Currie

Minister of Justice Attorney General of Canada
- In office 10 December 1946 – 30 June 1948
- Prime Minister: W. L. Mackenzie King
- Preceded by: Louis St. Laurent
- Succeeded by: Louis St. Laurent

Minister of Finance
- In office 8 July 1940 – 9 December 1946
- Prime Minister: W. L. Mackenzie King
- Preceded by: James Ralston
- Succeeded by: Douglas Abbott

Postmaster General
- Acting; 23 May 1940 – 7 July 1940
- Prime Minister: W. L. Mackenzie King
- Preceded by: Charles Gavan Power
- Succeeded by: William Pate Mulock

Minister of National Revenue
- In office 23 October 1935 – 7 July 1940
- Prime Minister: W. L. Mackenzie King
- Preceded by: Robert Charles Matthews
- Succeeded by: Colin W. G. Gibson

Member of Parliament for Hants—Kings (Digby—Annapolis—Kings; 1935–1948)
- In office 14 September 1926 – 28 October 1948
- Preceded by: Arthur de Witt Foster
- Succeeded by: George Nowlan

Personal details
- Born: James Lorimer Ilsley; 3 January 1894 Somerset, Nova Scotia, Canada
- Died: 14 January 1967 (aged 73) Halifax, Nova Scotia, Canada
- Party: Liberal
- Spouse: Evelyn Wilhelmina Smith (m. 1919)
- Children: 2
- Education: Acadia University (BA); Dalhousie University (LLB)
- Profession: Barrister

James Lorimer Ilsley PC KC (3 January 1894 – 14 January 1967) was a Canadian politician and jurist. He was minister of finance from 1940 to 1946. He was finance minister during World War II; to fund the increase in wartime expenditure, he dramatically expanded the income tax by imposing it on millions of workers and citizens.

== Early life ==
He was born in Somerset, Nova Scotia, the son of Randel Ilsley and Catherine Caldwell. Ilsley was educated at Acadia University where he served as Editor-In-Chief of the university newspaper The Athenaeum. He then attended Dalhousie University and was admitted to the Nova Scotia bar in 1916. In 1919, he married Evelyn Smith. Ilsley then practised law in Yarmouth and Halifax, Nova Scotia until 1926.

== Political career ==
He was elected to the House of Commons of Canada as a Liberal in the 1926 election. He survived the 1930 election that sent the Liberals into Opposition. When the Liberal Party returned to power in the 1935 election, Prime Minister William Lyon Mackenzie King brought Ilsley into Cabinet as Minister of National Revenue.

=== Finance minister ===
In 1940, he was promoted to Minister of Finance. He held that position for the duration of World War II during a period of massive expansion in expenditure due to the war effort, described as a "transformation of the Canadian tax system" by historian Colin Campbell. Under his direction, the minimum income required to pay income tax was push dramatically downward, effectively changing income tax from a "class tax" on the wealthiest 300,000 or so Canadians to a national tax.

He also led the Victory Bond campaign, brought in wage and price controls in 1941, and deal with several currency crises. He was also known for his call for personal sacrifice by civilians during the war and led by example by giving up his car and riding the streetcar to Parliament Hill. In 1945, despite the taxes he had imposed on the general public, he was rated the most popular cabinet minister in the cabinet.

He was recognized for his service in 1946 when he was appointed to the Imperial Privy Council, and given the honorific of "Right Honourable".

=== Minister of justice ===
The same year, he became Minister of Justice. He served in that position until he retired from politics in 1948.

== Later life ==
Illsley retired from politics in 1948. The next year, he was appointed to the Nova Scotia Supreme Court and became Chief Justice of Nova Scotia in 1950. He served in that capacity until his death in 1967 in Halifax at the age of 73.

J. L. Ilsley High School, opened in 1971 and located in Spryfield, Nova Scotia, bears his name.

== Electoral record ==
1925 Canadian federal election: Hants—Kings
Party	Candidate	Votes
Conservative	Arthur de Witt Foster	10,168
Liberal	James Lorimer Ilsley	9,110

1926 Canadian federal election: Hants—Kings
Party	Candidate	Votes
Liberal	James Lorimer Ilsley	10,261
Conservative	Arthur de Witt Foster	10,181

1930 Canadian federal election: Hants—Kings
Party	Candidate	Votes
Liberal	James Lorimer Ilsley	11,059
Conservative	Arthur de Witt Foster	9,947
Source: lop.parl.ca
