= William Henry Chipman =

Canadian politician

William Henry Chipman (November 3, 1807 – April 10, 1870) was a Canadian politician and a member of the House of Commons of Canada for the riding of Kings in Nova Scotia.

He was born at Cornwallis, Nova Scotia, the son of Reverend William Chipman and Mary Dickey, in Kings County. Early in his youth he was sent to Saint John, New Brunswick, to learn business practices at the firm of Leverett DeVeber. He later worked as a merchant selling general merchandise, holding mortgages on large tracts of land, and loaning money to business ventures. In 1831, Chipman married Sophia Araminta Cogswell.

He was elected to the 1st Canadian Parliament on September 20, 1867, as a member of the Anti-Confederation Party. At the anti-confederate convention of August 1868 in Halifax, Nova Scotia, in opposition to Joseph Howe, he proposed that the best way of getting the Confederation repealed would be for all anti-confederate Members of Parliament to offer their resignations. The policy was not accepted, and he continued to sit in the House of Commons. From January 30, 1869, onward he was a member of the Liberal Party. He died on April 9, 1870, in Ottawa from an onset of smallpox.

Following Chipman's death in Ottawa at the age of 62, his son Leverett was elected to the same seat in the House of Commons.
