= Eliza Ritchie =

Canadian suffragist (1856–1933)

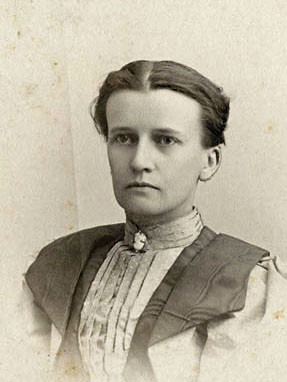
- Born: 20 May 1856; Halifax, Nova Scotia, British North America
- Died: 5 September 1933 (aged 77); Halifax, Nova Scotia, Canada
- Education: Dalhousie University, Cornell University
- Occupations: Educator, Suffragist

Dr. Eliza Ritchie (20 May 1856 – 5 September 1933) was a prominent suffragist in Nova Scotia, Canada.

== Biography ==
Ritchie was born on 20 May 1856 in Halifax, Nova Scotia. She was the daughter of John William Ritchie and Amelia Almon. She attended Dalhousie University and went on to earn her doctorate in German philosophy from Cornell University in 1889, becoming one of the first Canadian women to receive a PhD. She traveled to Leipzig, Germany, and Oxford, England to further her studies. She taught at a variety of universities in the United States before returning to Canada in 1899.

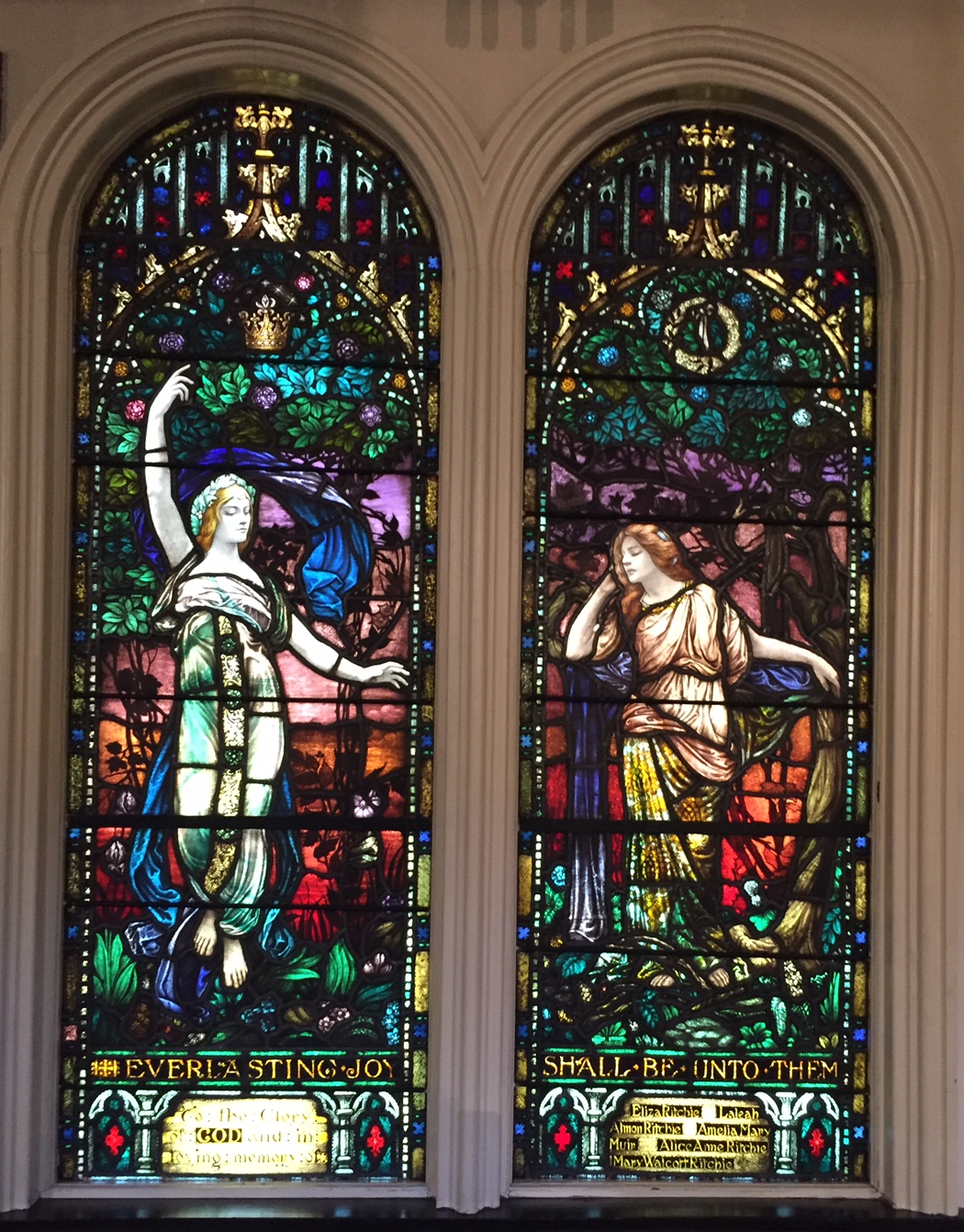
Ritchie Sisters Windows, St. Paul's Church (Halifax) Nova Scotia

Beginning in 1901 she lectured philosophy at Dalhousie University. She joined her sisters, Ella Almon and Mary Walcot, in social activism in Halifax. She was on the executive of the Local Council of Women of Halifax, and the Board of the Victoria School of Art. Ritchie worked with Agnes Dennis and Edith Archibald to further the cause of women's suffrage.

Ritchie wrote The Problem of Personality in 1889 and Songs of the Maritimes in 1931.

Ritchie was president of the Dalhousie Alumnae Association. In 1919 was appointed to the Dalhousie Board of Governors, the first woman to serve. In 1927, she received an honorary degree from Dalhousie, the first woman to have that honor.

Ritchie never married. She died on 5 September 1933 in Halifax.

== Legacy ==
Ritchie was the namesake of Dalhousie University residence Eliza Ritchie Hall which was demolished in 2015. She also has a stained glass window in St. Paul's Church (Halifax) dedicated to her and her sisters.
