= Kings (Nova Scotia federal electoral district) =

Former federal electoral district in Nova Scotia, Canada

Nova Scotia electoral district

Defunct federal electoral district
- Legislature: House of Commons
- District created: 1867
- District abolished: 1924
- First contested: 1867
- Last contested: 1921

Demographics
- Census division: Kings

Kings was a federal electoral district in Nova Scotia, Canada, that was represented in the House of Commons of Canada from 1867 to 1925.

It was created in the British North America Act, 1867. The riding was abolished in 1924 when it was merged into Hants—Kings riding. It consisted of Kings County.

== Members of Parliament ==
This riding elected the following members of Parliament:

Parliament	Years	Member	Party
Kings
1st	1867–1869	William Henry Chipman	Anti-Confederation
1st	1869–1870	William Henry Chipman	Liberal
1st	1870–1872	Leverett de Veber Chipman	Liberal
2nd	1872–1874	Leverett de Veber Chipman	Liberal
3rd	1874–1878	Frederick William Borden	Liberal
4th	1878–1882	Frederick William Borden	Liberal
5th	1882–1887	Douglas Benjamin Woodworth	Liberal–Conservative
6th	1887–1891	Frederick William Borden	Liberal
7th	1891–1891	Frederick William Borden	Liberal
7th	1892–1896	Frederick William Borden	Liberal
8th	1896–1896	Frederick William Borden	Liberal
8th	1896–1900	Frederick William Borden	Liberal
9th	1900–1904	Frederick William Borden	Liberal
10th	1904–1908	Frederick William Borden	Liberal
11th	1908–1911	Frederick William Borden	Liberal
12th	1911–1917	Arthur de Witt Foster	Conservative
13th	1917–1921	Robert Borden	Government (Unionist)
14th	1921–1925	Ernest William Robinson	Liberal
Riding dissolved into Hants—Kings

== Election results ==
1867 Canadian federal election
Party	Candidate	Votes
Anti-Confederation	William Henry Chipman	1,472
Unknown	J. N. Coleman	659
Eligible voters		2,851
Source: Canadian Parliamentary Guide, 1871

By-election on 23 June 1870 On Mr. Chipman's death, 9 April 1870
Party	Candidate	Votes
Liberal	Leverett de Veber Chipman	acclaimed

1872 Canadian federal election
Party	Candidate	Votes
Liberal	Leverett de Veber Chipman	1,317
Unknown	John Leander (J.L.) Wickwire	713

1874 Canadian federal election
Party	Candidate	Votes
Liberal	Frederick William Borden	1,043
Liberal	Leverett de Veber Chipman	945

1878 Canadian federal election
Party	Candidate	Votes
Liberal	Frederick William Borden	1,639
Liberal–Conservative	Douglas B. Woodworth	1,374

1882 Canadian federal election
Party	Candidate	Votes
Liberal–Conservative	Douglas B. Woodworth	1,707
Liberal	Frederick William Borden	1,357

1887 Canadian federal election
Party	Candidate	Votes
Liberal	Frederick William Borden	1,970
Liberal–Conservative	Douglas B. Woodworth	1,522

1891 Canadian federal election
Party	Candidate	Votes
Liberal	Frederick William Borden	1,815
Conservative	C.R. Bill	1,654

By-election on 13 February 1892 On Mr. Borden being unseated on petition, 28 November 1891
Party	Candidate	Votes
Liberal	Frederick William Borden	acclaimed

1896 Canadian federal election
Party	Candidate	Votes
Liberal	Frederick William Borden	2,252
Conservative	W.C. Bill	1,781

By-election on 30 July 1896 On Mr. Borden being named Minister of Militia and Defence, 11 July 1896
Party	Candidate	Votes
Liberal	Frederick William Borden	acclaimed

1900 Canadian federal election
Party	Candidate	Votes
Liberal	Frederick William Borden	2,233
Conservative	Barclay Webster	1,890

1904 Canadian federal election
Party	Candidate	Votes
Liberal	Frederick William Borden	2,594
Conservative	J.W. Ryan	1,427

1908 Canadian federal election
Party	Candidate	Votes
Liberal	Frederick William Borden	2,482
Conservative	Nathan Woodworth Eaton	1,991

1911 Canadian federal election
Party	Candidate	Votes
Conservative	Arthur de Witt Foster	2,474
Liberal	Frederick William Borden	2,323

1917 Canadian federal election
Party	Candidate	Votes	%	Elected
Government (Unionist)	Robert Borden	3,941	60.96	✓
Opposition (Laurier Liberals)	James Sealy	2,524	39.04	
Total valid votes		6,465	100.0	
Source(s) "Kings, Nova Scotia (1867-08-06 - 1925-09-04)". History of Federal Ridings Since 1867. Library of Parliament.

1921 Canadian federal election
Party	Candidate	Votes
Liberal	Ernest William Robinson	5,812
Conservative	Horton W. Phinney	5,097

== See also ==
- List of Canadian electoral districts
- Historical federal electoral districts of Canada

Parliament of Canada
Preceded by Halifax	Constituency represented by the prime minister 1917-1920	Succeeded by Portage la Prairie
