= Douglas Benjamin Woodworth =

Canadian politician

Member of Parliament for Kings
- In office 1882–1887
- Preceded by: Frederick William Borden
- Succeeded by: Frederick William Borden

Member of the Nova Scotia House of Assembly for Kings County
- In office 1871–1878

Personal details
- Born: 1 June 1841
- Died: 2 January 1900 (aged 58)
- Party: Liberal-Conservative
- Spouse: Elizabeth - Daughter of the Honorable Ezra Churchill, Senator
- Occupation: lawyer

Douglas Benjamin Woodworth, QC (1 June 1841 – 2 January 1900) was a lawyer and member of the Woodworth political family from Nova Scotia, Canada. He represented Kings in the House of Commons of Canada from 1882 to 1887 as a Liberal-Conservative member.

== Life ==
He was born in Canning, Nova Scotia, the son of Benjamin Baxter Woodworth and Eunice L. Pineo. Woodworth was educated at the Sackville Academy, at Truro, and at Harvard University. In 1865, he married Elizabeth, the daughter of Senator Ezra Churchill. In the same year, he was called to the Nova Scotia bar.

=== Public service ===
He represented King's County in the Nova Scotia House of Assembly from 1871 to 1878 as a Conservative, considered the de facto leader of his party. Woodworth ran unsuccessfully for a federal seat in 1878 but was elected in 1882. In 1884, he was named Queen's Counsel. The Toronto Mail and Montreal Gazette considered him the parliamentarian and speaker of the parliament, and he was considered the best debater.

He was unsuccessful when he ran for reelection in 1887.

==== Landers v. Woodworth ====
Woodworth sparked the landmark Canadian Supreme Court decision in Landers v. Woodworth (1878), 2 S.C.R. 158, which justified the provincial legislatures passing statutes outlining the privileges of their members. This had a dramatic impact on the early governance of Canada, which continues into the modern era. The provincial legislatures previously had attempted to legislate their privileges, which were repeatedly rendered by the privy council as ultra vires.

The case arose in 1874 when Woodworth charged the provincial secretary of the Nova Scotia House of Assembly with falsifying a record. The charge was investigated and deemed unfounded. Subsequently, the assembly charged Woodworth with breach of privilege by making accusations without sufficient evidence to support it. They ordered Woodworth to make a dictated apology and he refused. The assembly then passed a resolution charging Woodworth with contempt and ordered him to withdraw until the apology was made. Woodworth refused to apologize or withdraw, which then the assembly passed a resolution ordering the sergeant-at-arms to physically remove Woodworth for obstruction.

Woodworth then filed a complaint charging the speaker and other members with assault, where he won a $500 verdict. Following an appeal where the verdict was upheld by the Supreme Court of Nova Scotia in favor of Woodworth, the Supreme Court of Canada ruled that absent an actual obstruction of business by Woodworth, the legislature had no authority to remove him and they were liable. The decision incorporated English law into the decision, which defined in Canada that a member of a legislature does not violate privilege by making a charge the assembly chose to investigate. On the issue of privilege statutes passed by the provincial legislatures, the court ruled it was not ultra vires for them to pass statutes defining their privileges, and recognized their discretion in passing such laws.

=== Death ===
Woodworth died in Oakland, California at the age of 58.
