= Alexander McKay (educator) =

Nova Scotia educator

Alexander McKay (1841–1917) was an educator in Nova Scotia who was instrumental in supporting the Nova Scotia College of Art and Design, the Local Council of Women of Halifax and education in Nova Scotia.

He is not to be confused with Alexander Howard MacKay (1848–1929), also a Nova Scotia educator.
