= Dalhousie University Faculty of Engineering =

Canadian university faculty

Coordinates: 44°38′33″N 63°34′22″W

Faculty of Engineering, Dalhousie University
- Former names: Nova Scotia Technical College, Technical University of Nova Scotia (1907 - 1997), DalTech Dalhousie University (1997)
- Type: Public Faculty of Engineering
- Established: 1907
- Affiliations: Dalhousie University
- Location: Halifax, Nova Scotia, Canada
- Website: Faculty of Engineering website

The Faculty of Engineering at Dalhousie University is a faculty of Dalhousie University in Halifax, Nova Scotia.

== History ==
The Faculty of Engineering was officially founded on 1 April 1997 with the merger of the Technical University of Nova Scotia (TUNS) into Dalhousie University. Dalhousie University had previously established an engineering faculty in 1905, but it was expensive to maintain, and in 1906, it was merged into the TUNS, which was established by a consortium of provincial universities and other interested bodies.

The Faculty of Engineering traces its history to the School of Engineering at TUNS and the Department of Engineering's 2-year diploma program of the Faculty of Science at Dalhousie University.

== Departments ==
The Faculty of Engineering includes the following departments:

- Civil and Resource Engineering
- Electrical & Computer Engineering
- Engineering Mathematics & Internetworking
- Industrial Engineering
- Mechanical Engineering
- Process Engineering & Applied Science
- Biomedical Engineering
