= George Henry Wright =

Canadian businessman (1849–1912)

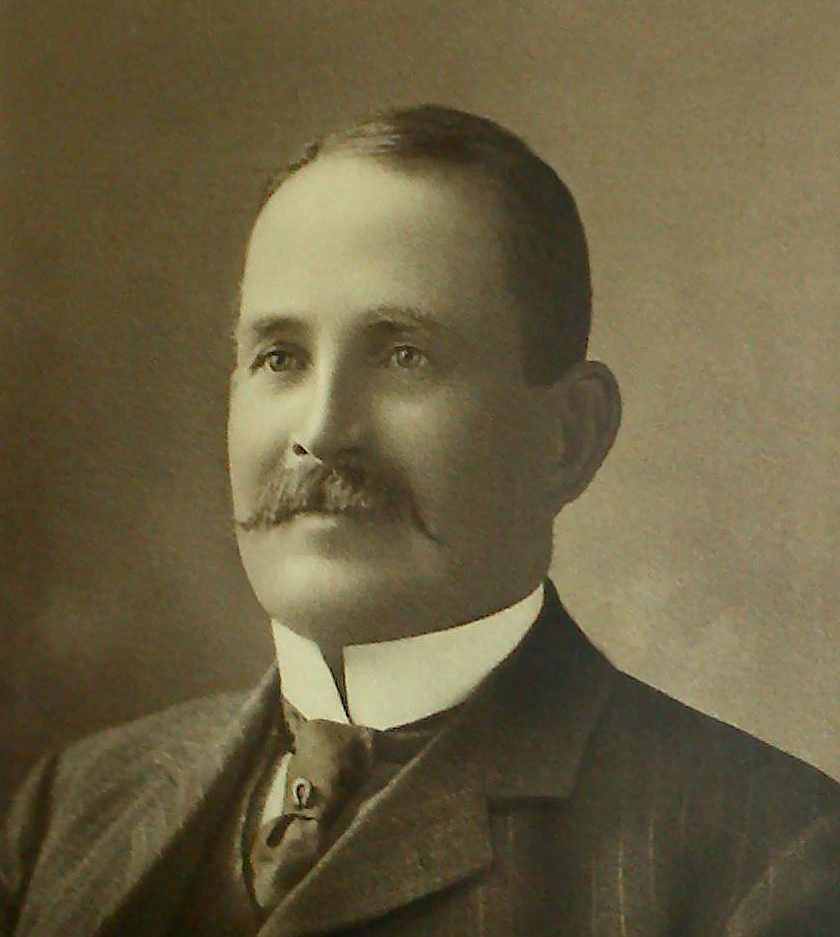
George Wright Halifax Nova Scotia

George Henry Wright (October 26, 1849 – April 15, 1912) was a significant businessman and philanthropist in Halifax, Nova Scotia. He was born at Wright's Cove, Nova Scotia and died in the sinking of the Titanic at the age of 62. He established Wright's World Business Directory in Boston and later returned to Halifax and invested in the city. His own house at 989 Young Ave, and two of his public buildings, the Marble Wright Building (1672 Barrington St.) and The Saint Paul Building, (1684 Barrington St., formerly the home of JW Doull's bookstore) still stand in downtown Halifax. They were all built by architect James Charles Philip Dumaresq.

He was a philanthropist who developed the first housing project in the province. He left in his will his house to the Local Council of Women of Halifax to further the cause of women's suffrage (women's right to vote was achieved six years after Wright's death). He also was one of the large contributors to the Y.M.C.A. building fund and Dalhousie University.

An enthusiastic yachtsman, Wright owned several boats including the sloop Princess, built by H.W. Embree and Sons in Port Hawkesbury, Nova Scotia. Wright also created the George Wright Cup, a racing trophy for sail races at the Royal Nova Scotia Yacht Squadron.

Although his body was never found, he has a grave marker in the Christ Church cemetery in Dartmouth.

== Legacy ==
- namesake of Wright Avenue, Halifax
- namesake of the Royal Nova Scotia Yacht Squadron's George Wright Cup.

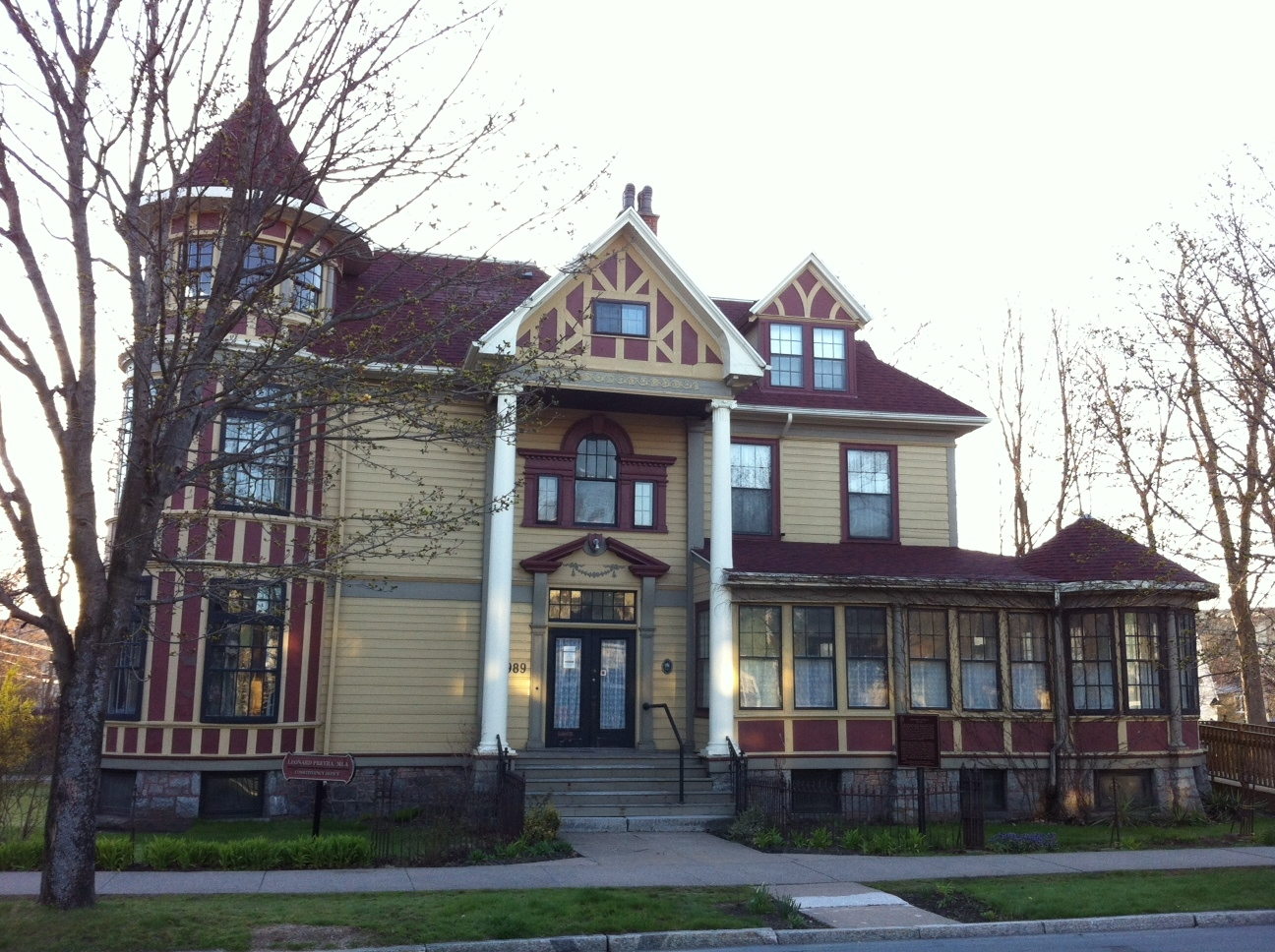
George Henry Wright House - Wright bequeathed his home to the Local Council of Women of Halifax, Nova Scotia (1912)

== See also ==
- Passengers of the RMS Titanic
