= Laura Borden =

Canadian politician (1861–1940)

Lady Borden
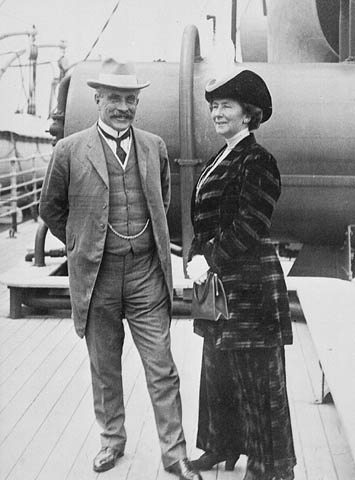
- Sir Robert and Lady Borden aboard SS Royal George en route to England, 1912
- Born: Laura Bond; November 26, 1861; Halifax, Nova Scotia, Canada
- Died: September 7, 1940 (aged 78); Ottawa, Ontario, Canada
- Resting place: Beechwood Cemetery, Ottawa, Ontario, Canada
- Known for: Spouse of the Prime Minister of Canada
- Spouse: Sir Robert Borden

Laura Borden, Lady Borden (née Bond; November 26, 1861 – September 7, 1940) was the wife of Sir Robert Laird Borden who was the eighth Prime Minister of Canada.

She was born in Halifax, Nova Scotia, and married Borden in September 1889. She served as president of the Local Council of Women of Halifax until her resignation in 1901.

She died in Ottawa in 1940 and is buried next to her husband at Beechwood Cemetery.

== See also ==
- Spouse of the prime minister of Canada
