= H.W. Embree and Sons =

Boat yard in Port Hawkesbury, Nova Scotia, Canada

Henry W. Embree and Sons, Boatbuilders, was a boat yard in Port Hawkesbury, Nova Scotia, that operated from 1859 to 1948. The youngest son of a boatbuilding family, Henry Embree established his own boat yard between Brown and Pitt Streets, on the Port Hawkesbury waterfront, next to the P. Paint and Sons warehouse.

Between 1815 and 1822, Samuel and Thomas Bangs Embree moved to Port Hawkesbury and began building ships from their shipyard on Embree Island. At times, Embree Shipbuilding employed as many as thirty men and was responsible for building at least five schooners, six brignantines, and one barque. Henry Embree learned the craft from his family and became known for his skill in boatbuilding.

In 1883, H. W. Embree and Sons were responsible for sending a fishing banker, or "Canso boat," to the International Fisheries Exhibition in London, where it won the first medal out of 7500 competitors. Displayed at full mast with a wax mannequin for a captain, the boat was purchased and used by the Prince of Wales, who would become Edward VII. Plans for the same boat were later purchased by the United States Fish Commission, as well as representatives from the Netherlands and Sweden.

The H.W. Embree boat yard constructed a variety of vessels, from fishing boats to schooners. Freeman Embree, one of the sons of Henry Embree, recalled that they constructed a house boat for Alexander Graham Bell; the Princess for George Wright, a Halifax philanthropist and businessman; and the Glencairn for J.H. Duggan. He also recalls building a "fast boat" for Mrs. Bell, which was unfortunately sold and later used for rum-running. At one time, the boat yard employed twenty-four men, as well as nineteen men on the night shift.

After the death of Henry W. Embree, Freeman Embree continued to run the business until it was sold in 1948.
