= Local Council of Women of Halifax =

Canadian organization

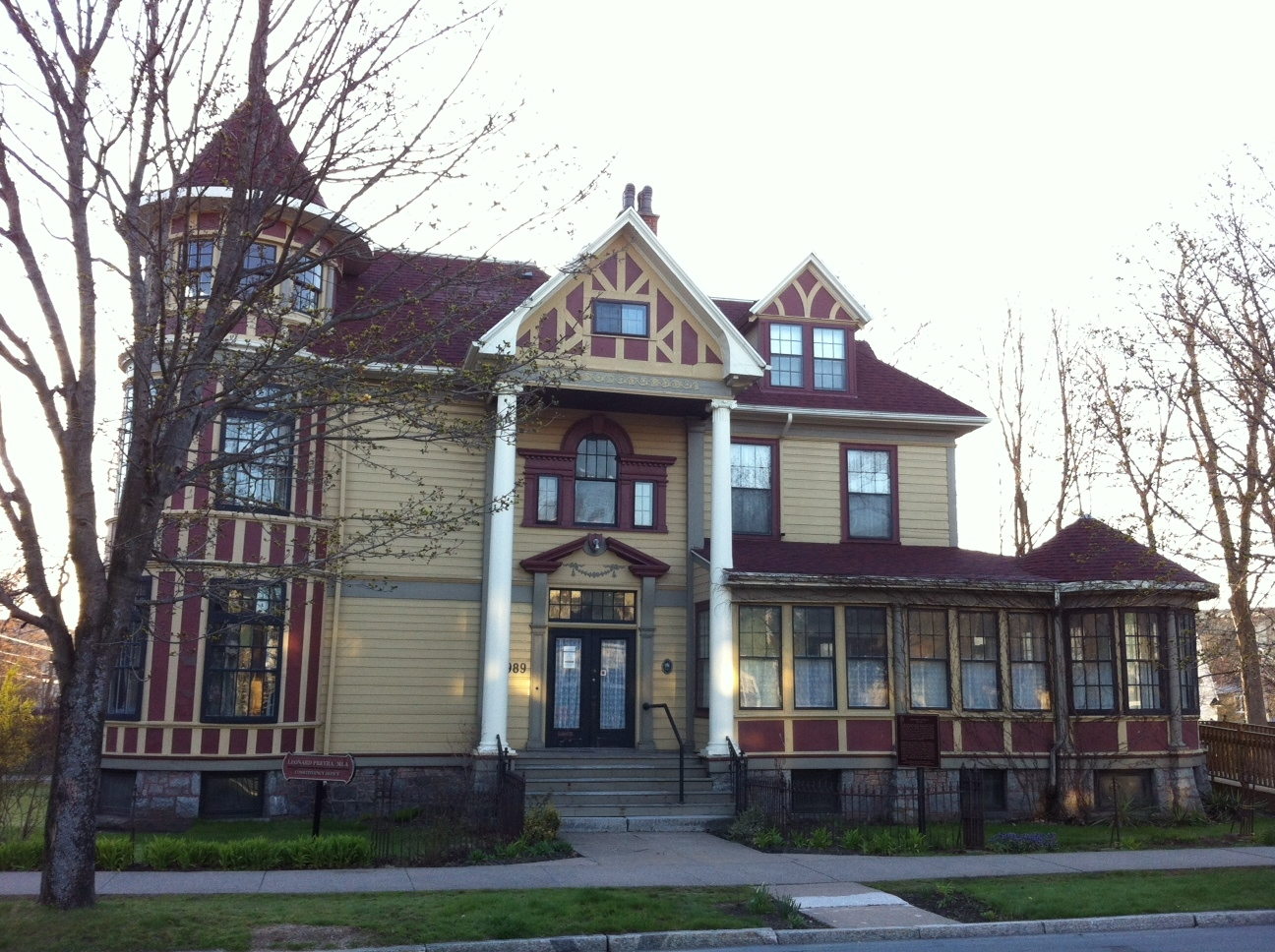
George Henry Wright House - Wright bequeathed his home to the Local Council of Women, Halifax Nova Scotia (1912)

The Local Council of Women of Halifax (LCWH) is an organization in Halifax, Nova Scotia devoted to improving the lives of women and children. One of the most significant achievements of the LCWH was its 24-year struggle for women's right to vote (1894-1918). The core of the well trained and progressive leadership was five women: Anna Leonowens (famous for The King and I), Edith Archibald (who eventually became the leader of the National Council), Eliza Ritchie, Agnes Dennis (president from 1906–20) and May Sexton. Halifax business man George Henry Wright left his home in his will to the LCWH, which the organization received after he died in the Titanic (1912). Educator Alexander McKay also was a significant supporter of the Council.

== Historical Context ==
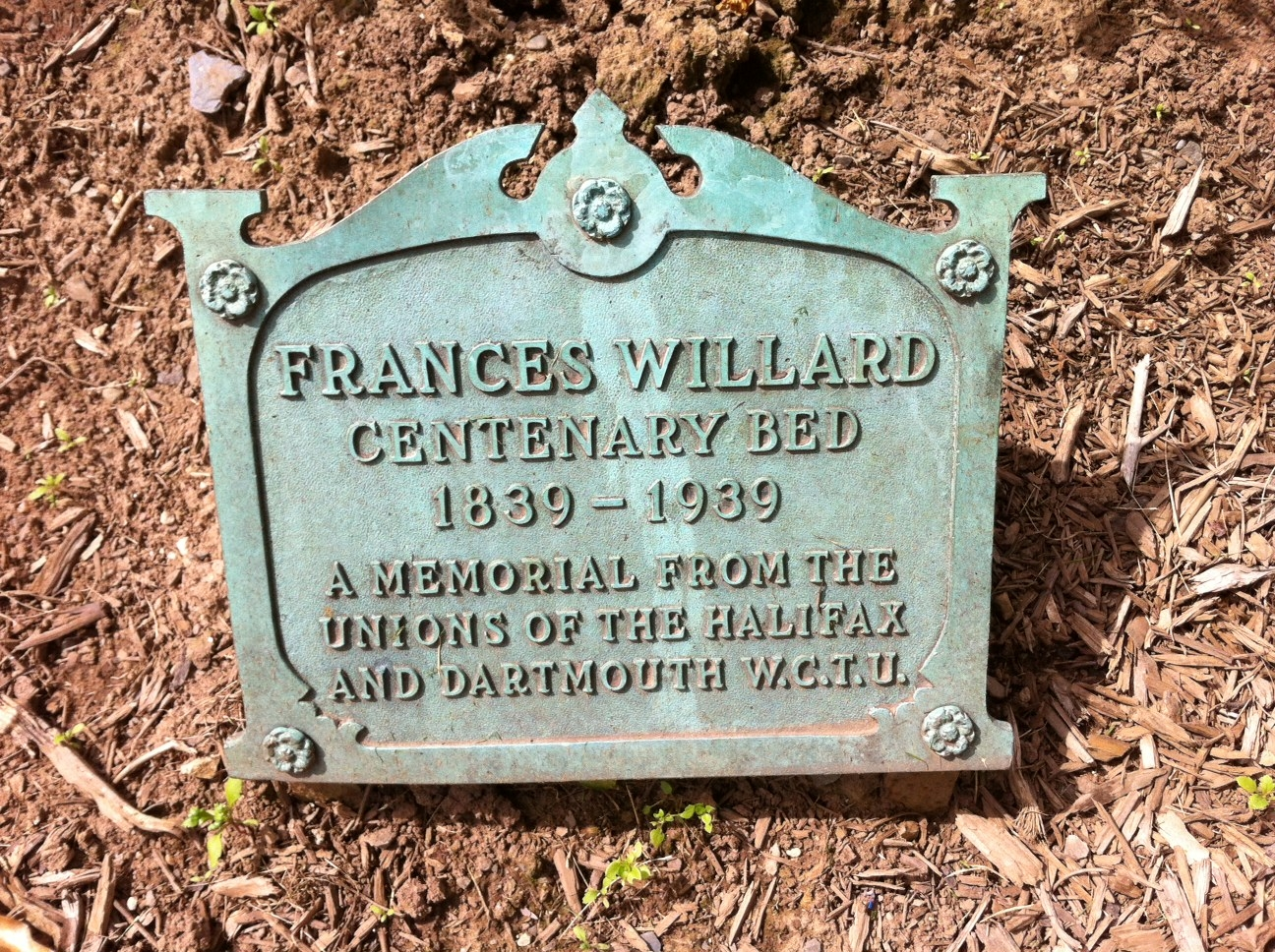
Frances Willard plaque and flower bed by the Halifax and Dartmouth Woman's Christian Temperance Union (1939), Halifax Public Gardens

In 1851 women were excluded from the vote in Nova Scotia. In 1870, Hannah Norris began to mobilize women into the public sphere through establishing the Woman’s Baptist Missionary Aid Society across the Maritimes. Following Frances Willard's visit to Halifax in 1878, Nova Scotia women organized local unions and a provincial Women’s Christian Temperance Union (WCTU). In 1884, the WCTU successfully lobbied for married women’s property legislation. In 1891 the WCTU officially endorsed the suffrage cause, the first major women's organization to support women's suffrage. Edith Archibald became the leader of the Maritime chapter of the WCTU the following year. (Women joined the WCTU "in numbers that greatly surpassed their participation in any other women's organization in the nineteenth century," making the WCTU "the first women's mass movement.") Two years later, in 1893, Edith Archibald and others made the first official attempt to have a suffrage bill for women property holders passed in Nova Scotia. The bill was passed by the legislature but quashed by Attorney General James Wilberforce Longley (who opposed unions and female emancipation for the twenty years he was in office).

== Suffrage ==
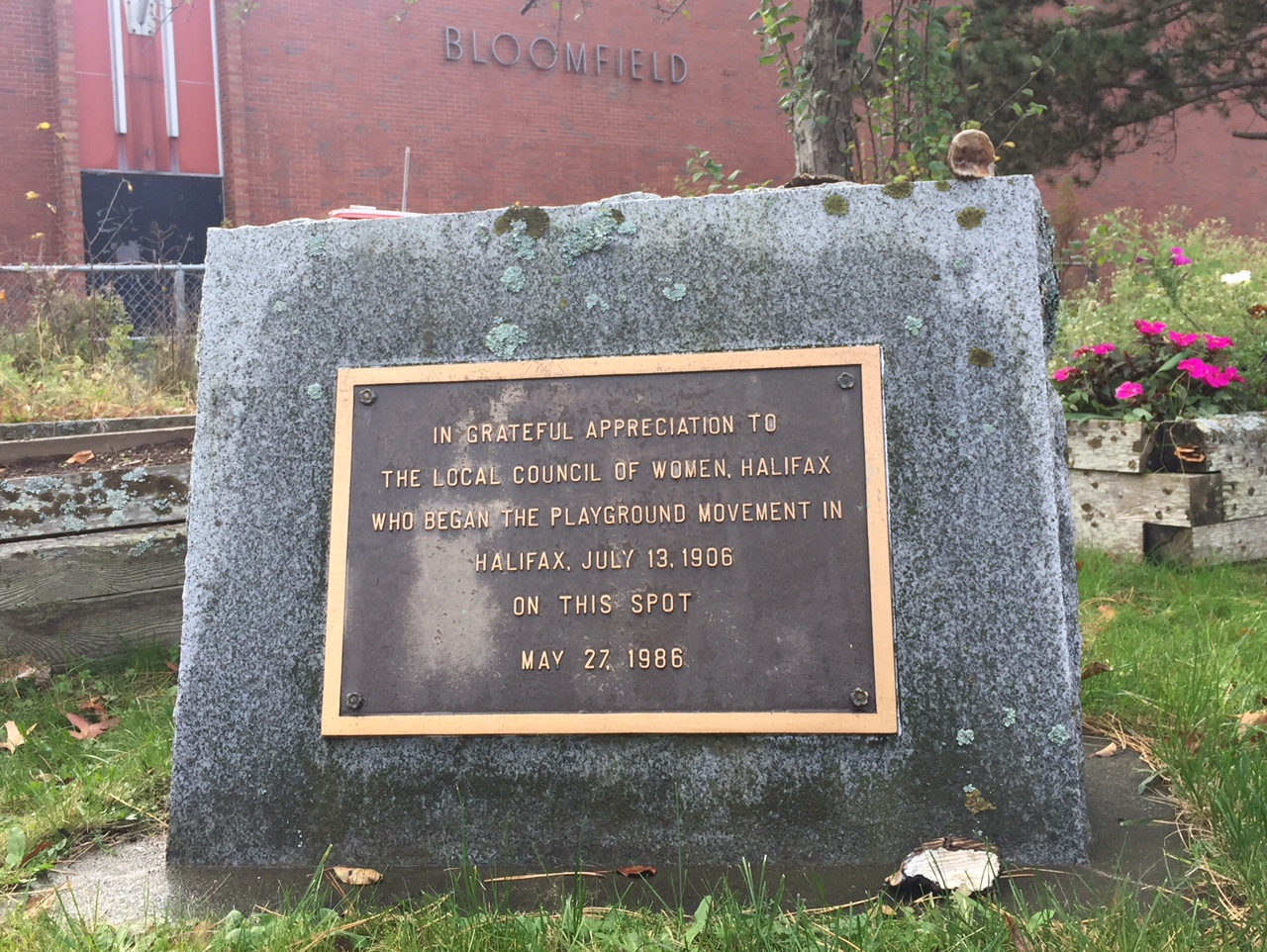
Plaque to mark the spot where the Playground movement began in Nova Scotia, (1906), Local Council of Women, Halifax, Nova Scotia

The year following the defeat of the first suffrage bill, the Local Council was established in 1894 as the local chapter of the National Council of Women of Canada (NCWC). On August 30, 1894, the executive committee met for the first time at Government House. Emma MacIntosh serving as the first president. Anna Leonowens was the secretary. Enfranchisement was the issue. (The concomitant preoccupation with enfranchisement was reflected locally in the founding of the Woman’s Suffrage Association in March 1895; Leonowens was president, assisted by sisters Eliza Ritchie and Mary Walcott Ritchie, along with Charlotte McInnes.) Between 1892 and 1895, thirty-four suffrage petitions were presented to the Nova Scotia legislature, and six suffrage bills were introduced, the final one in 1897.

In June 1897 the annual meeting of the National Council was convened in Halifax, where presentations were made by Lady Aberdeen and American suffragist May Wright Sewall.

On June 11, 1914, the Suffrage Club was established at Wright's home to work on granting women the right to vote throughout the province. On 22 February 1917 the LCWH presented a suffrage petition endorsed by forty-one women's organizations. When the Liberal Premier ignored the issue, irate members introduced a private member bill. Its defeat marked the birth of the Nova Scotia Equal Franchise League in the spring of 1917.

On April 26, 1918, with the support of premier George Henry Murray, the Assembly passed The Nova Scotia Franchise Act, which gives women the right to vote in Nova Scotia's provincial elections, the first province to do so in Atlantic Canada. (A month later Nova Scotian and Prime Minister of Canada Robert Borden - whose wife Laura Bond was former president of the LCWH - used his majority to pass women's suffrage for the whole country. Almost forty-three years later, on 1 February 1961, Gladys Porter became the first woman elected to the House of Assembly.)

== Other contributions ==
The members of the LCWH (the Nova Scotia 5) established the following organizations:

- Victoria School of Art and Design (NSCAD)
- Art Gallery of Nova Scotia
- Nova Scotia Red Cross
- Children's Hospital, Halifax (IWK)
- Dalhousie Alumnae Association
- Forrest Hall, Dalhousie's first residence for women
- Halifax Victorian Order of Nurses
- Dalhousie Review
- Ladies Musical Club of Halifax
- Halifax Playground Commission
- Pioneer Book Club
- Shakespeare Club
- Official Employment Bureau
- School of Domestic Science
- Women's Welcome Hostel
- Anti-Tuberlculosis League

== Nova Scotia 5 ==
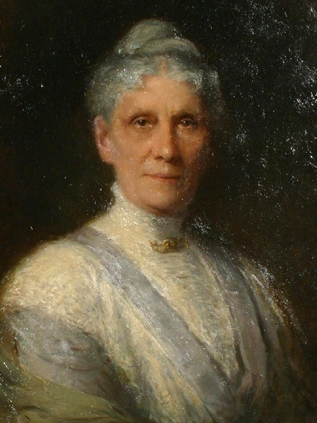
Anna Leonowens - made famous in musical The King and I

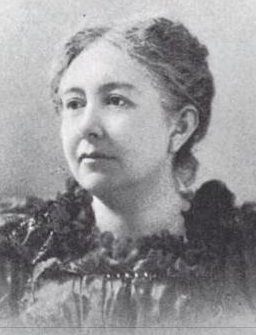
Edith Archibald

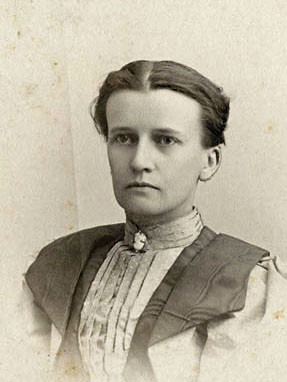
Eliza Ritchie

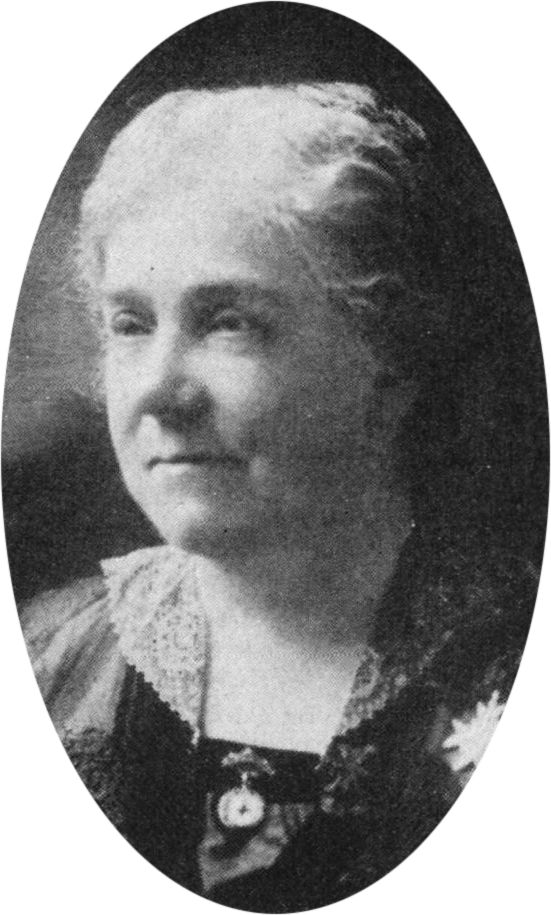
Agnes Dennis

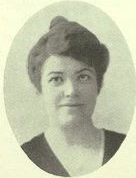
May Sexton

== Other members ==
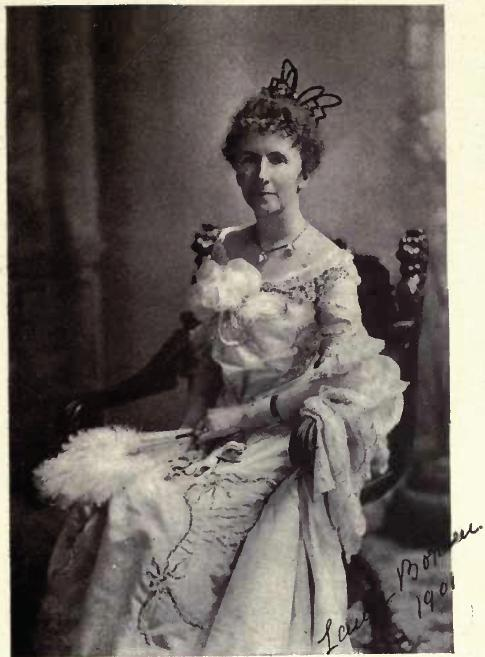
Laura Borden - wife of Prime minister Robert Borden

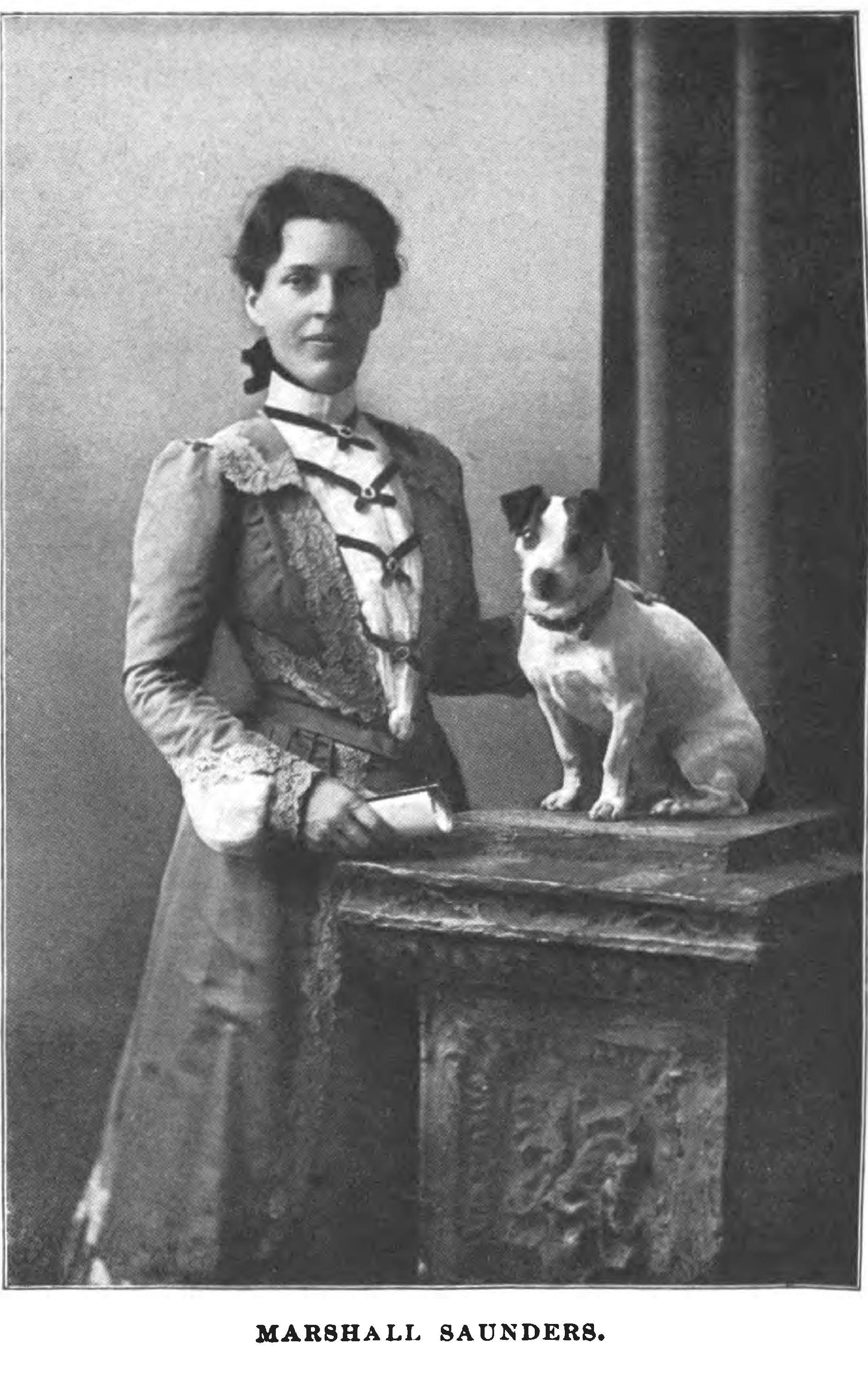
Margaret Marshall Saunders - author of Beautiful Joe
- Charlotte McInnes
- Mary Walcott Ritchie

== See also ==
- Nova Scotia Human Rights Commission
- Feminism in Canada
- Transition House Association of Nova Scotia

== Links ==
- Council of Women, Halifax
- Fine Arts Gallery - under management of Council of Women
