= Leverett de Veber Chipman =

Canadian politician (1831–1914)

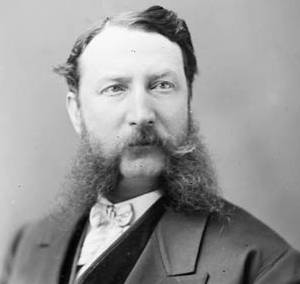
Leverett de Veber Chipman Source: Library and Archives Canada

Leverett de Veber Chipman (October 20, 1831 – January 8, 1914) was a Nova Scotia businessman and political figure. He represented Kings in the House of Commons of Canada as a Liberal member from 1870 to 1874.

He was born in Cornwallis, Nova Scotia in 1831, the son of William Henry Chipman and Sophia Araminta Cogswell. Chipman was educated at the Horton Academy and Acadia College. He entered business as a hardware merchant in Cornwallis. In 1853, he married Nancy Leonard Moore. He was first elected to the House of Commons in 1870 after the death of his father, who had been elected in Kings in 1867. Chipman served as a lieutenant-colonel in the local militia. He was an agent for the Bank of Nova Scotia in Kentville. He was also auditor for the town of Kentville and clerk for Kings County. He died in Kentville in 1914.
