= Lakeville, Nova Scotia =

Community in Nova Scotia, Canada

Coordinates: 45°07′N 64°36′W

Lakeville is a community in the Canadian province of Nova Scotia, located in Kings County.

It sits on the south-facing foot of the North Mountain, five kilometers due north of Coldbrook and is named for Silver Lake, a small lake popular for picnics and fishing. Called Lakeville Lake by locals, Silver Lake is believed to be a glacial kettle lake.

Route 221 is the main thoroughfare. The village is surrounded by rich farmland.
