= Hants—Kings =

Former federal electoral district in Nova Scotia, Canada

Nova Scotia electoral district

Defunct federal electoral district
- Legislature: House of Commons
- District created: 1924
- District abolished: 1933
- First contested: 1925
- Last contested: 1930

Hants—Kings was a federal electoral district in the province of Nova Scotia, Canada, that was represented in the House of Commons of Canada from 1925 to 1935.

This riding was created in 1924 from Hants and Kings ridings. It consisted of the Counties of Hants and Kings. It was abolished in 1933 when it was redistributed into Colchester—Hants and Digby—Annapolis—Kings ridings.

== Members of Parliament ==
This riding elected the following members of Parliament:

Parliament	Years	Member	Party
Hants—Kings; Riding created from Hants and Kings
15th	1925–1926	Arthur de Witt Foster	Conservative
16th	1926–1930	James Lorimer Ilsley	Liberal
17th	1930–1935	James Lorimer Ilsley	Liberal
Riding dissolved into Colchester—Hants and Digby—Annapolis—Kings

== Election results ==
1925 Canadian federal election
Party	Candidate	Votes
Conservative	Arthur de Witt Foster	10,168
Liberal	James Lorimer Ilsley	9,110

1926 Canadian federal election
Party	Candidate	Votes
Liberal	James Lorimer Ilsley	10,261
Conservative	Arthur de Witt Foster	10,181

1930 Canadian federal election
Party	Candidate	Votes
Liberal	James Lorimer Ilsley	11,059
Conservative	Arthur de Witt Foster	9,947
Source: lop.parl.ca

== See also ==
- List of Canadian electoral districts
- Historical federal electoral districts of Canada
