= Arthur de Witt Foster =

Canadian politician

Arthur DeWitt Foster (May 17, 1886 – March 2, 1939) was an educator, broker and political figure in Nova Scotia, Canada. He represented Kings from 1911 to 1915 and Hants—Kings from 1925 to 1926 in the House of Commons of Canada as a Conservative.

He was born in Hampton, Nova Scotia, the son of Aron Judson Foster and Eunice Lavinia Chuter, and was educated at the Provincial Normal School and Acadia University. In 1912, he married Charlotte Lawrence. Foster taught school in Wolfville and Kentville. He resigned his seat in the House of Commons in 1915. From 1916 to 1924, he was Superintendent of the Colonization Department, Canadian National Railway. He was also director of Foster's Tours in Chicago. Foster was defeated when he ran for reelection in 1926 and 1930.

== Electoral record ==
1925 Canadian federal election: Hants—Kings
| Party | Candidate | Votes |
|---|---|---|
| Conservative | Arthur de Witt Foster | 10,168 |
| Liberal | James Lorimer Ilsley | 9,110 |

1926 Canadian federal election: Hants—Kings
| Party | Candidate | Votes |
|---|---|---|
| Liberal | James Lorimer Ilsley | 10,261 |
| Conservative | Arthur de Witt Foster | 10,181 |

1930 Canadian federal election: Hants—Kings
| Party | Candidate | Votes |
|---|---|---|
| Liberal | James Lorimer Ilsley | 11,059 |
| Conservative | Arthur de Witt Foster | 9,947 |
Source: lop.parl.ca
