= History of women in Canada =

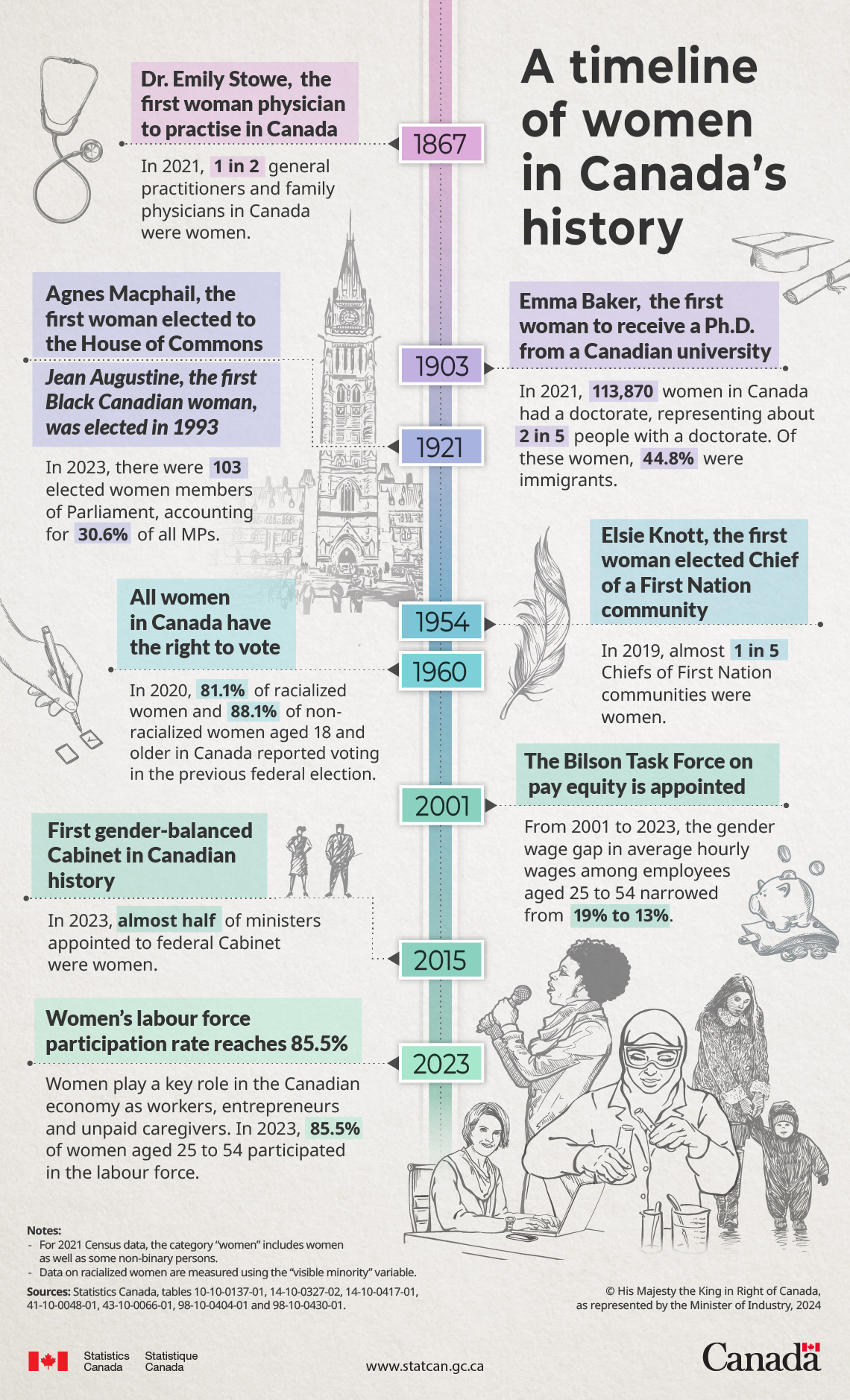

General statistics
- Maternal mortality (per 100,000): 8.5 (2022)
- Women in parliament: 28.3%
- Women over 25 with secondary education: 100.0%
- Women in labour force: 74% [M: 81%]

Gender Inequality Index
- Value: 0.069 (2021)
- Rank: 17th out of 191

Global Gender Gap Index
- Value: 0.777 (2022)
- Rank: 24th out of 146

The History of women in Canada is the study of the historical experiences of women living in Canada and the laws and legislation affecting Canadian women. In colonial period of Canadian history, Indigenous women's roles were often challenged by Christian missionaries, and their marriages to European fur traders often brought their communities into greater contact with the outside world. Throughout the colonial period, European women were encouraged to immigrate to Canadian colonies and expand the white population. After Confederation in 1867, women's experiences were shaped by federal laws and by legislation passed in Canada's provincial legislatures.

Women have been a key part of Canada's labour market, social movements, and culture for centuries, and yet they have faced systematic discrimination. Women were given the federal franchise in 1918, served in both the First World War and the Second World War, and participated in the second-wave feminist movement from the 1960s onwards. Historians have been researching and writing about women's history in Canada in increasing numbers since the 1960s.

== Quebec ==
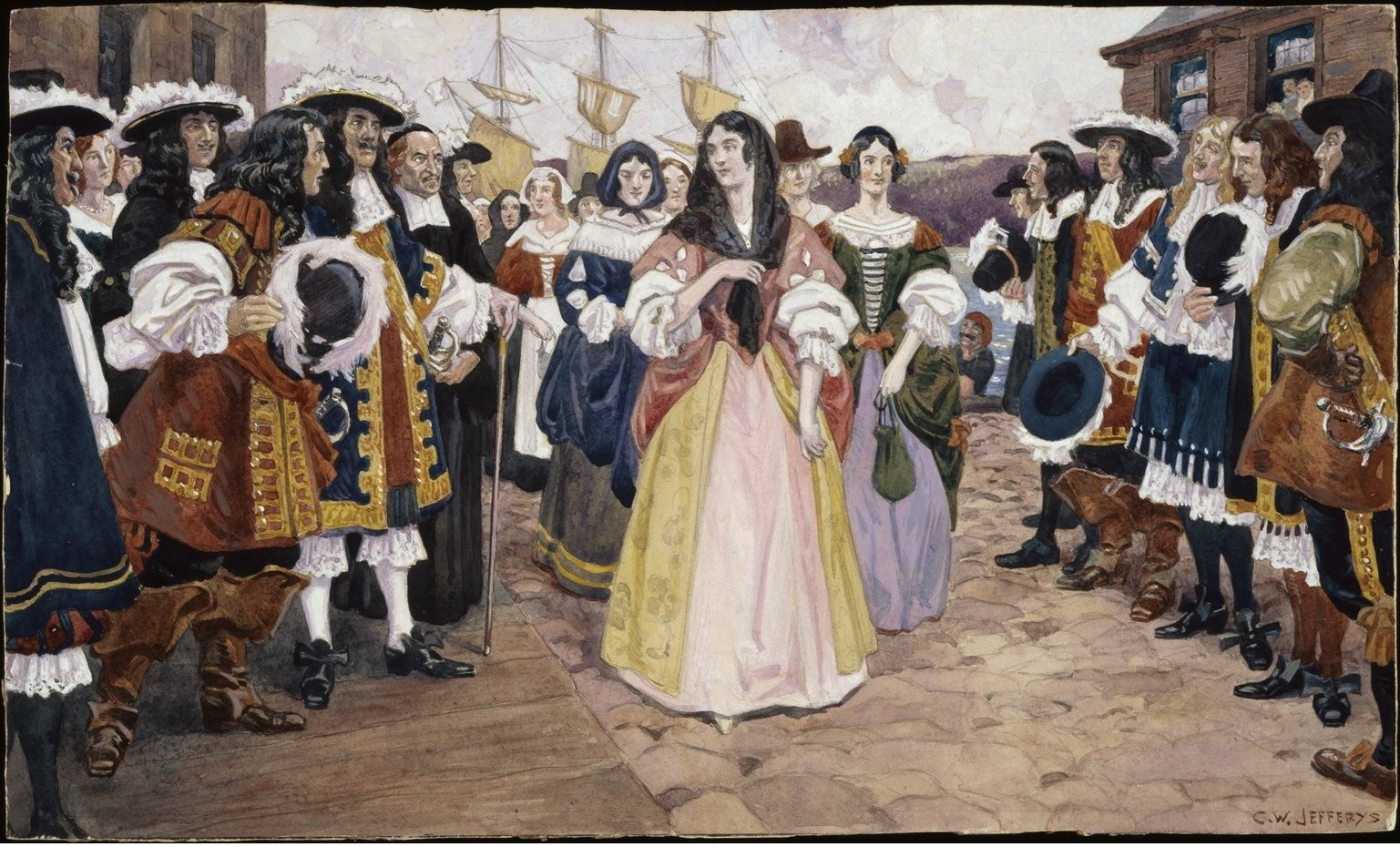
One group of King's Daughters arrives at Quebec, 1667

In the 1660s, the French government sent about 800 young women (single or widowed) called King's Daughters ("filles du roi"). They quickly found husbands among the predominantly male settlers, as well as a new life for themselves. They came mostly from poor families in the Paris area, Normandy, and the central-western regions of France. A handful were ex-prostitutes, but only one is known to have practised that trade in Canada. As farm wives with very good nutrition and high birth rates, they played a major role in establishing family life and enabling rapid demographic growth. They had about 30% more children than comparable women who remained in France. Landry says, "Canadians had an exceptional diet for their time. This was due to the natural abundance of meat, fish, and pure water; the good food conservation conditions during the winter; and an adequate wheat supply in most years."

Besides household duties, some women participated in the fur trade, the major source of cash in New France. They worked at home alongside their husbands or fathers as merchants, clerks, and provisioners. Some were widowed and took over their husbands' roles. A handful were active entrepreneurs in their own right.

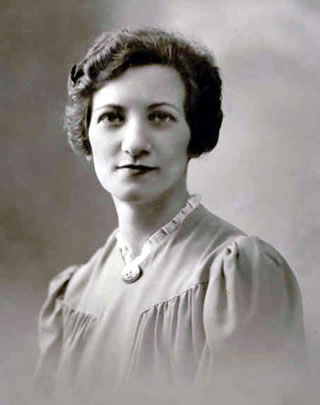
Léa Roback (1903–2000) was a Canadian trade union organizer, social activist, pacifist, and feminist from Quebec

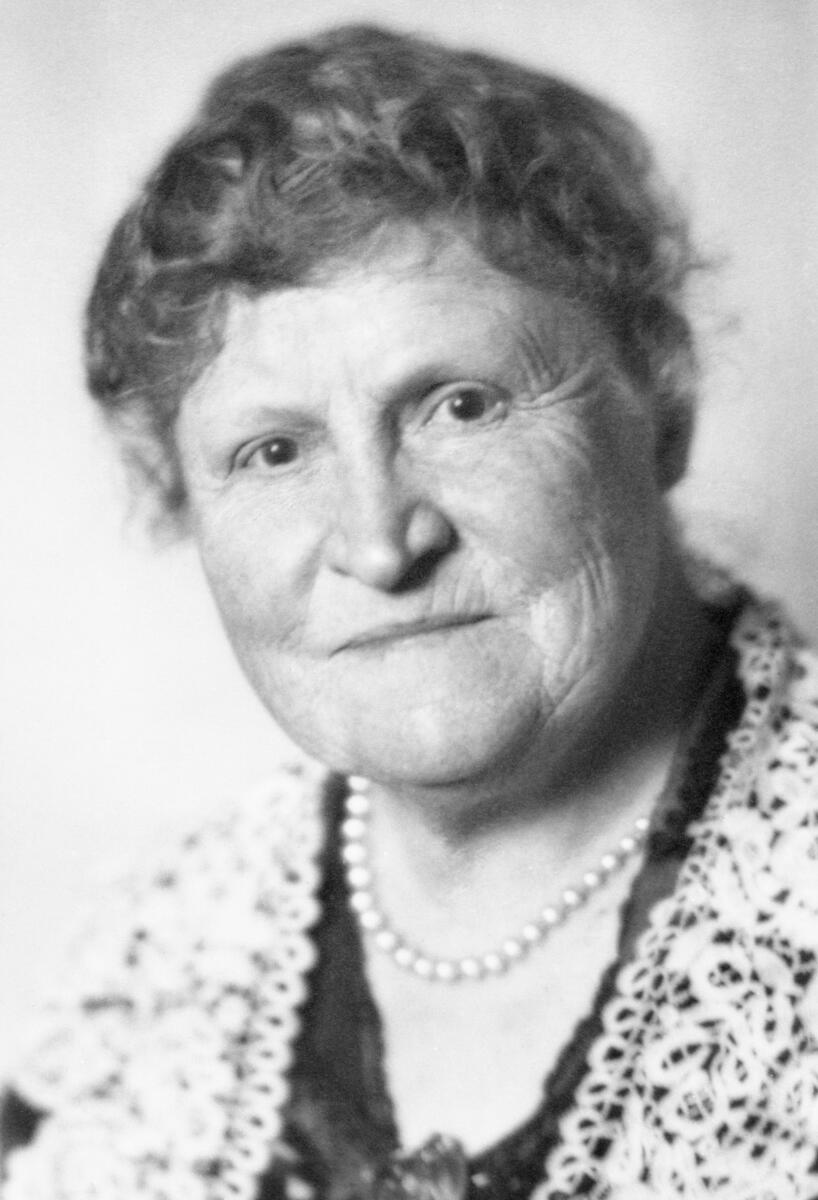
Henrietta Edwards (1849–1931) was a Canadian women's rights activist and reformer from Quebec. She was a member of The Famous Five.

In the early 19th century down to the 1950s, upper-class Anglos dominated high society in Montreal, and their women constructed and managed their identity and social position through central events in the social life, such as the coming out of debutantes. The elite young women were trained in intelligent philanthropy and civic responsibility, especially through the Junior Leagues. They seldom connected with the reform impulses of the middle-class women, and for and were paternalistic in their views of the needs of working-class women.

=== Catholic nuns ===
Outside the home, Canadian women had few domains which they controlled. An important exception came with Roman Catholic nuns, especially in Quebec. Stimulated by the influence in France of the popular religiosity of the Counter Reformation, new orders for women began appearing in the seventeenth century. In the next three centuries, women opened dozens of independent religious orders, funded in part by dowries provided by the parents of young nuns. The orders specialized in charitable works, including hospitals, orphanages, homes for unwed mothers, and schools. In the first half of the twentieth century, about 2–3% of Quebec's young women became nuns; there were 6,600 in 1901 and 26,000 in 1941. In Quebec in 1917, 32 different teaching orders operated 586 boarding schools for girls. At that time, there was no public education for girls in Quebec beyond elementary school. Hospitals were another specially, the first of which was founded in 1701. In 1936, the nuns of Quebec operated 150 institutions, with 30,000 beds to care for the long-term sick, the homeless, and orphans. On a smaller scale, Catholic orders of nuns operated similar institutions in other provinces.

The Quiet Revolution of the 1960s combined declericalization with the dramatic reforms of Vatican II. There was a dramatic change in the role of nuns. Many left the convent, while very few young women entered. The provincial government took over the nuns' traditional role as provider of many of Quebec's educational and social services. Often, ex-nuns continued the same roles in civilian dress, but also men for the first time started entering the teaching profession.

=== Historiography ===
The history of women in Quebec was generally neglected before 1980. The advent of the feminist movement, combined with the "New social history" that featured the study of ordinary people, created a new demand for a historiography of women. The first studies emerged from a feminist perspective and stressed their role as the terms who had been reduced to inferiority in a world controlled by men. Feminists sought the family itself as the centrepiece of the patriarchal system, where fathers and husbands oppressed and alienated women. The second stage came when historians presented a more positive and balanced view. Research has often been interdisciplinary, using insights from feminist theory, literature, anthropology, and sociology to study gender relations, socialization, reproduction, sexuality, and unpaid work. Labour and family history have proved particularly open to these themes.

=== Marriage and family law ===
In Quebec, women's rights within marriage and family law have advanced slower than in the rest of Canada. Quebec has been slow on giving civil rights to married women: until 1954, a married woman was legally listed as "incapable of contracting", together with minors, "interdicted persons", "persons insane or suffering a temporary derangement of intellect ... or who by reason of weakness of understanding are unable to give a valid consent", and "persons who are affected by civil degradation". The removal of the married woman from this list, however, did little to improve her legal situation, due to marriage laws which restricted her rights and gave the husband legal authority over her: legal incapacity was still the general rule. A major change followed in 1964: Bill 16 (An Act respecting the legal capacity of married women) removed the obligation of the wife to obey her husband, and gave the married woman full legal capacity subject to restrictions that may result from the matrimonial regime. However, discriminatory provisions resulting from matrimonial regimes and from other legal regulations still remained. In July 1970, Bill 10 came into force, reforming matrimonial regimes, and improving the situation of married women. In 1977 another important change took place: the wife obtained equal rights with the husband with regard to legal authority over the children during marriage, abolishing the previous rule of 'paternal authority' which gave the husband more legal rights with regard to judicial matters concerning the children; the new law created the concept of parental authority shared equally between the wife and husband. A major change also happened in April 1981, when new family regulations based on gender equality came into force. Other reforms followed throughout the 1980s, including the introduction of the concept of family patrimony in 1989, in order to ensure financial equality between spouses when the marriage ends. On January 1, 1994 the new Civil Code of Quebec came into effect, replacing the old one. This new code contains the current family law of Quebec, and it is based on gender equality: article 392 reads: "The spouses have the same rights and obligations in marriage."

Due to its Catholic heritage and traditionally strong influence of the church on political issues, Quebec has been very reluctant to accept divorce. Until 1968, there was no uniform federal divorce law in Canada, Quebec did not have a divorce law, and spouses in Quebec could only end their marriage if they obtained a private act of Parliament. Since 1968, divorce law throughout Canada is under exclusive jurisdiction of the federal Parliament; the current law being the Divorce Act (Canada) 1985, which came into force in June 1986. It has been argued that one of the explanations for the current high rates of cohabitation in Quebec is that the traditionally strong social control of the church and the Catholic doctrine over people's private relations and sexual morality, resulting in conservative marriage legislation and resistance to legal change, has led the population to rebel against traditional and conservative social values and avoid marriage altogether. Since 1995, the majority of births in Quebec are outside of marriage; as of 2015, 63% of births were outside of marriage.

== Maritimes ==
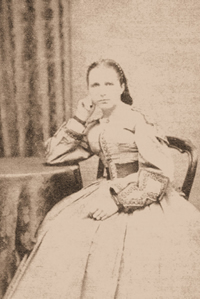
Bessie Hall (1849–1935) was a seafaring woman from Granville Ferry, Nova Scotia.

In the 19th century, middle-class Anglo women across Canada, especially in the Maritime provinces, transformed the interior decoration of their homes. Instead of austere functionality, they enlivened their living spaces with plush furniture, deep carpets, handmade fancy-work, hanging plants, bookcases, inexpensive paintings, and decorations. They gleaned their ideas from ladies' magazines and from each other. They were taking more and more control of their "separate sphere" of the home, which they transformed into a comfortable retreat from the vicissitudes of a competitive masculine business world.

From the late 19th century to the Great Depression, thousands of young, single women from the Maritime provinces migrated to better paying jobs in New England. Their family needed the money, and most worked as household servants or factory workers in the textile mills and shoe factories. After 1900, some came to work as professional women, especially teachers and nurses. Most returned home permanently to get married. Some women in the Maritimes pursued work in heavily male dominated work such as seafaring. An increasing number of women went to sea in the 19th century, although usually in the more traditional domestic role as stewardesses. Bessie Hall from Granville Ferry, Nova Scotia, trained as a navigator and took command of a fever-ridden ship in the 1870s, but she left the sea, as women were not permitted to be officers. Molly Kool of Alma, New Brunswick, broke the professional barriers against women at sea in 1938, when she became the first woman in the western world to win her captain's licence.

While New Brunswick gave women the right to vote in 1919, women in this province obtained the right to hold political office only in 1934.

== Ontario ==
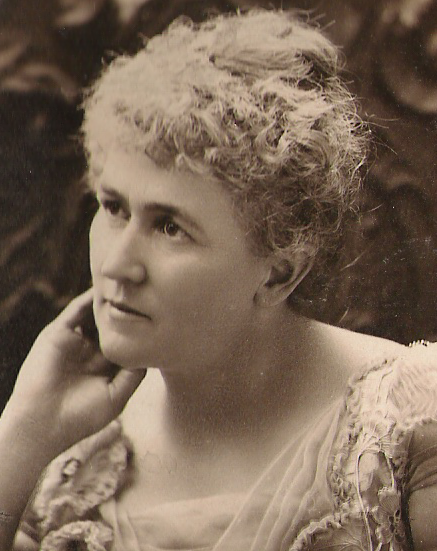
Portrait of Adelaide Hunter Hoodless, a Canadian advocate for the welfare of women and children. Photograph taken c. 1895.

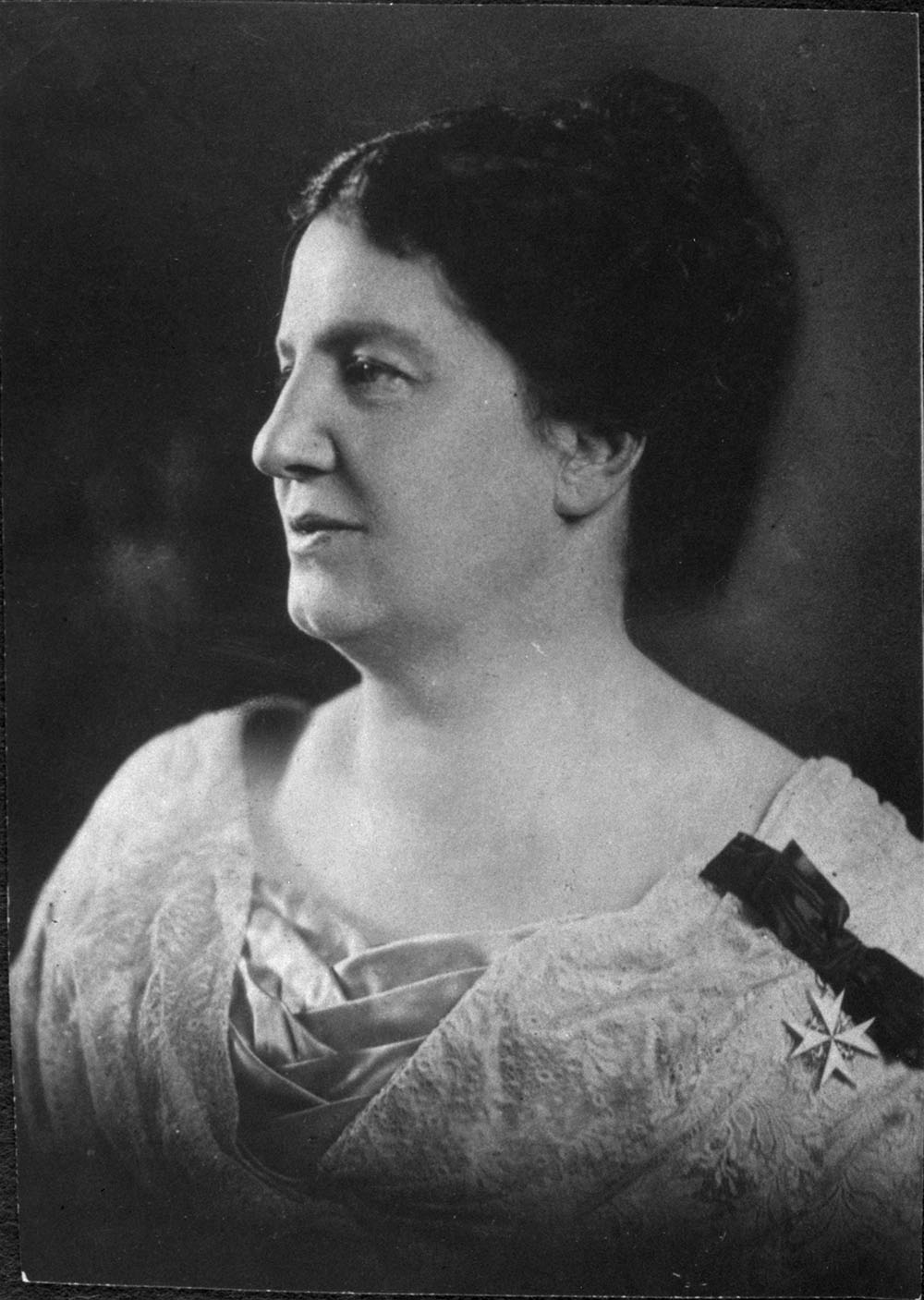
Emily Murphy (1868–1933) was a women's rights activist, jurist, and author. In 1916, she became the first female magistrate in Canada, and in the British Empire. She was a member of The Famous Five.

The care of illegitimate children was a high priority for private charities. Before 1893, the Ontario government appropriated grants to charitable infants' homes for the infants and for their nursing mothers. Most of these infants were illegitimate; most of their mothers were poor. Many babies arrived in poor physical condition, and their chances of survival outside such homes was poor.

Ontario's Fair Employment Practices Act combatted racist and religious discrimination after the Second World War, but it did not cover gender issues. Indeed, most human rights activists did not raise the issue before the 1970s, because they were family-oriented and subscribed to the deeply embedded ideology of the family wage, whereby the husband should be paid enough so the wife could be a full-time housewife. Cases of married mothers who pursued part-time work occurred, e.g. Faith Avis in Kingston, Ontario, yet these women were unable to reach their full employment potential under such circumstances. After lobbying by women, labor unions, and the Co-operative Commonwealth Federation (CCF), the Conservative government passed the Female Employees Fair Remuneration Act in 1951. It required equal pay for women who did the same work as men. Feminists in the 1950s and 1960s were unsuccessful in calling for a law that would prohibit other forms of sex discrimination, such as discrimination in hiring and promotion. The enforcement of both acts was constrained by their conciliatory framework. Provincial officials interpreted the equal pay act quite narrowly and were significantly more diligent in tackling racist and religious employment discrimination.

== Prairie provinces ==
Gender roles were sharply defined in the West. Men were primarily responsible for breaking the land; planting and harvesting; building the house; buying, operating, and repairing machinery; and handling finances. At first, there were many single men on the prairie, or husbands whose wives were still back east, but they had a hard time. They realized the need for a wife. As the population increased rapidly, wives played a central role in settlement of the prairie region. Their labor, skills, and ability to adapt to the harsh environment proved decisive in meeting the challenges. They prepared bannock, beans, and bacon; mended clothes; raised children; cleaned; tended the garden; sold eggs and butter; helped at harvest time; and nursed everyone back to health. While prevailing patriarchal attitudes, legislation, and economic principles obscured women's contributions, the flexibility exhibited by farm women in performing productive and nonproductive labor was critical to the survival of family farms, and thus to the success of the wheat economy.

== Aboriginals ==
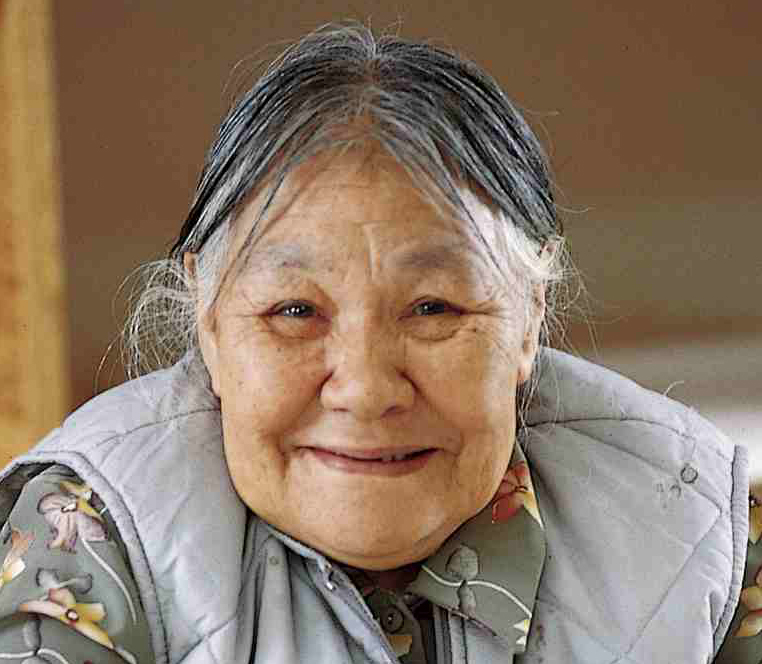
Kenojuak Ashevak was a Canadian artist. She is regarded as one of the most notable Canadian pioneers of modern Inuit art.

There have been relatively few scholarly studies of indigenous women.

In the 20th century, Native Homemakers' Clubs have played a central role for women in First Nation communities. They were first organized in Saskatchewan in 1937. The clubs were a vehicle for education, activism, and agency for Native women. The Department of Indian Affairs (DIA) encourage the expansion of homemakers’ clubs, which numbered 185 by 1955.

== Employment ==
In the early 19th century cities, most women were housewives. However, some were employed, chiefly as domestic laborers, unskilled workers, prostitutes, nuns (in Catholic areas), and teachers; a few were governesses, washerwomen, midwives, dressmakers, or innkeepers. The great majority of Canadian women lived in rural areas, where they worked at home, or as domestic servants, until they married and became housewives. British women, such as Maria Rye, set up organizations to help girls and women emigrate to Canada.

=== Domestic servants ===
From the late 19th century to 1930, 250,000 women immigrated from Europe, especially from Britain and Ireland. Middle class housewives eagerly welcomed domestic workers, many of them Irish, as the rising income of the middle class created an increasing demand for servants that was greater than the local supply. However, the turnover was very high, as most servants soon married.

=== Proprietors ===
In the 19th century, few women were sole proprietors of businesses or professional services, like law and medicine. However, many did work closely with their husbands, fathers, brothers, and sons in operating shops and stores. The reform of married women's property law in the 19th century made it legally possible for wives to run businesses independently of their husbands. In reality, however, the interpretation of the courts made the wife a dependent partner in the marriage who owed her labour and services primarily to her husband. Therefore, most of the women running businesses were widows who had inherited their husband's business.

=== Nursing and medicine ===
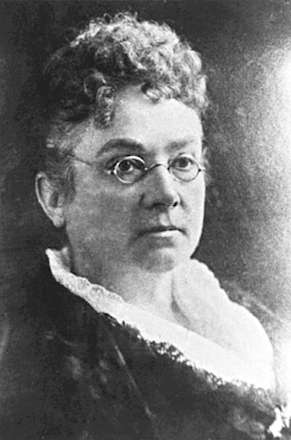
Emily Stowe (1831–1903) was the first female doctor to practise in Canada. Her daughter, Augusta Stowe-Gullen, was the first woman to earn a medical degree in Canada.

In the late nineteenth and early twentieth centuries, women made inroads into various professions, including teaching, journalism, social work, and public health. Nursing was well-established. These advances included the establishment of a Women’s Medical College in Toronto (and in Kingston, Ontario) in 1883, attributed in part to the persistence of Emily Stowe, the first female doctor to practise in Canada. Stowe’s daughter, Augusta Stowe-Gullen, became the first woman to graduate from a Canadian medical school. Graduating from medical school did not ensure that women were allowed to attain licensing. Elizabeth Scott Matheson graduated in 1898, but she was refused her licence to practise by the Northwest Territories College of Physicians and Surgeons. The government contracted with her as the district physician for $300 annually in 1901, though she was unable to secure her licence until 1904.

Apart from a token few, women were outsiders to the male-dominated medical profession. As physicians became better organized, they successfully had laws passed to control the practice of medicine and pharmacy and banning marginal and traditional practitioners. Midwifery—practised along traditional lines by women—was restricted and practically died out by 1900. Even so, the great majority of childbirths took place at home until the 1920s, when hospitals became preferred, especially by women who were better educated, more modern, and more trusting in modern medicine.

==== Prairie provinces ====
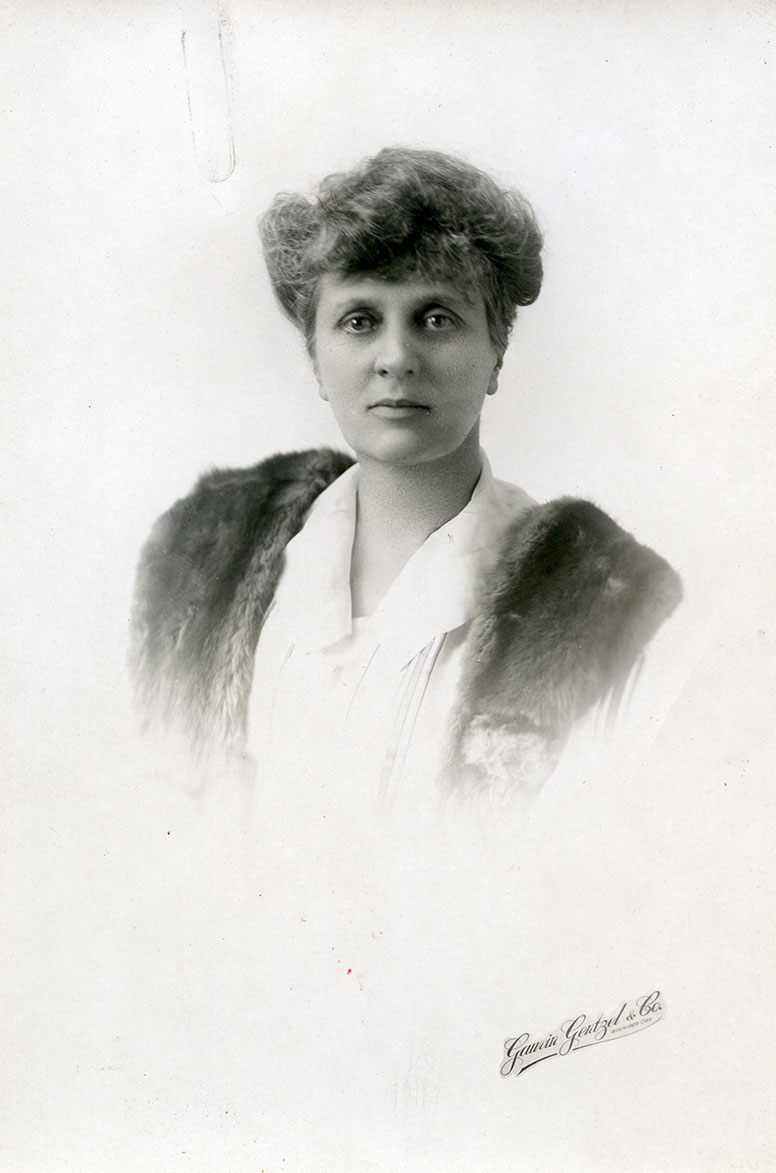
Irene Parlby (1868–1965) was a Canadian women's farm leader, activist, politician, and a member of The Famous Five

In the Prairie provinces, the first homesteaders relied on themselves for medical services. Poverty and geographic isolation empowered women to learn and practice medical care with the herbs, roots, and berries that worked for their mothers. They prayed for divine intervention but also practiced supernatural magic that provided as much psychological as physical relief. The reliance on homeopathic remedies continued, as trained nurses and doctors and how-to manuals slowly reached the homesteaders in the early 20th century.

After 1900, medicine and especially nursing modernized and became well organized.

The Lethbridge Nursing Mission in Alberta was a representative Canadian voluntary mission. It was founded, independent of the Victorian Order of Nurses, in 1909 by Jessie Turnbull Robinson. A former nurse, Robinson was elected as president of the Lethbridge Relief Society and began district nursing services aimed at poor women and children. The mission was governed by a volunteer board of women directors and began by raising money for its first year of service through charitable donations and payments from the Metropolitan Life Insurance Company. The mission also blended social work with nursing, becoming the dispenser of unemployment relief.

Richardson (1998) examines the social, political, economic, class, and professional factors that contributed to ideological and practical differences between leaders of the Alberta Association of Graduate Nurses (AAGN), established in 1916, and the United Farm Women of Alberta (UFWA), founded in 1915, regarding the promotion and acceptance of midwifery as a recognized subspecialty of registered nurses. Accusing the AAGN of ignoring the medical needs of rural Alberta women, the leaders of the UFWA worked to improve economic and living conditions of women farmers. Irene Parlby, the UFWA's first president, lobbied for the establishment of a provincial Department of Public Health, government-provided hospitals and doctors, and passage of a law to permit nurses to qualify as registered midwives. The AAGN leadership opposed midwife certification, arguing that nursing curricula left no room for midwife study, and thus nurses were not qualified to participate in home births. In 1919 the AAGN compromised with the UFWA, and they worked together for the passage of the Public Health Nurses Act that allowed nurses to serve as midwives in regions without doctors. Thus, Alberta's District Nursing Service, created in 1919 to coordinate the province's women's health resources, resulted chiefly from the organized, persistent political activism of UFWA members and only minimally from the actions of professional nursing groups clearly uninterested in rural Canadians' medical needs.

The Alberta District Nursing Service administered health care in the predominantly rural and impoverished areas of Alberta in the first half of the 20th century. Founded in 1919 to meet maternal and emergency medical needs by the United Farm Women (UFWA), the Nursing Service treated prairie settlers living in primitive areas lacking doctors and hospitals. Nurses provided prenatal care, worked as midwives, performed minor surgery, conducted medical inspections of schoolchildren, and sponsored immunization programs. The post-Second World War discovery of large oil and gas reserves resulted in economic prosperity and the expansion of local medical services. The passage of provincial health and universal hospital insurance in 1957 precipitated the eventual phasing out of the obsolete District Nursing Service in 1976.

==== Military services ====
Over 4,000 women served as nurses in uniform in the Canadian Armed Forces during the Second World War. They were called "Nursing Sisters" and had already been professionally trained in civilian life. However, in military service, they achieved an elite status well above what they had experienced as civilians. The Nursing Sisters had much more responsibility and autonomy, and they had more opportunity to use their expertise than civilian nurses. They were often close to the front lines, and the military doctors – mostly men – delegated significant responsibility to the nurses because of the high level of casualties, the shortages of physicians, and the extreme working conditions.

== Upper classes in 19th century ==
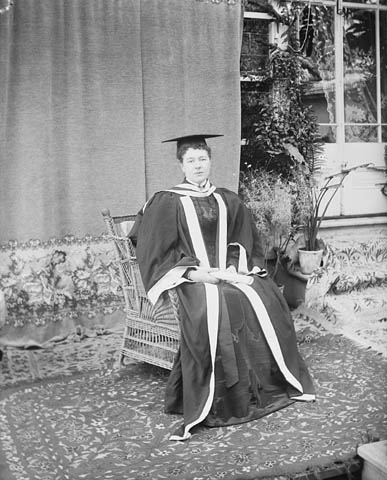
Victorian Order of Nurses founder Lady Aberdeen was the first woman to receive an honorary degree in Canada.

The upper classes of Canada, apart from some Quebec French families were largely of British origin. Military and government officials and their families came to British North America from England or Scotland; some arrived from Ulster. Most business interests were controlled by men of British descent. French-Canadians remained largely culturally isolated from English-speaking Canadians (a situation later described in Two Solitudes by Hugh MacLennan).

English-speaking Canadian writers became popular, especially Catharine Parr Traill and her sister Susanna Moodie, middle-class English settlers who published memoirs of their demanding lives as pioneers. Traill published The Backwoods of Canada (1836) and Canadian Crusoes (1852), and Moodie published Roughing it in the Bush (1852) and Life in the Clearings (1853). Their memoirs recount the harshness of life as women settlers but were nonetheless popular.

Upper-class Canadian women emulated British culture and imported as much of it as possible across the Atlantic. Books, magazines, popular music, and theatre productions were all imported to meet women's consumer demand.

Upper-class women supported philanthropic causes similar to the educational and nursing charities championed by upper-class women in England. The Victorian Order of Nurses, still in existence, was founded in 1897 as a gift to Queen Victoria to commemorate her Diamond Jubilee. The Imperial Order Daughters of the Empire, founded in 1900, supports educational bursaries and book awards to promote Canadian patriotism but also to support knowledge of the British Empire. One of the patrons of Halifax's Victoria School of Art and Design (founded in 1887 and later named the Nova Scotia College of Art and Design) was Anna Leonowens. Women began making headway in their struggle to gain access to higher education. In 1875, the first woman university graduate in Canada was Grace Annie Lockhart (Mount Allison University). In 1880, Emily Stowe became the first woman licensed to practise medicine in Canada.

== Women's clubs ==
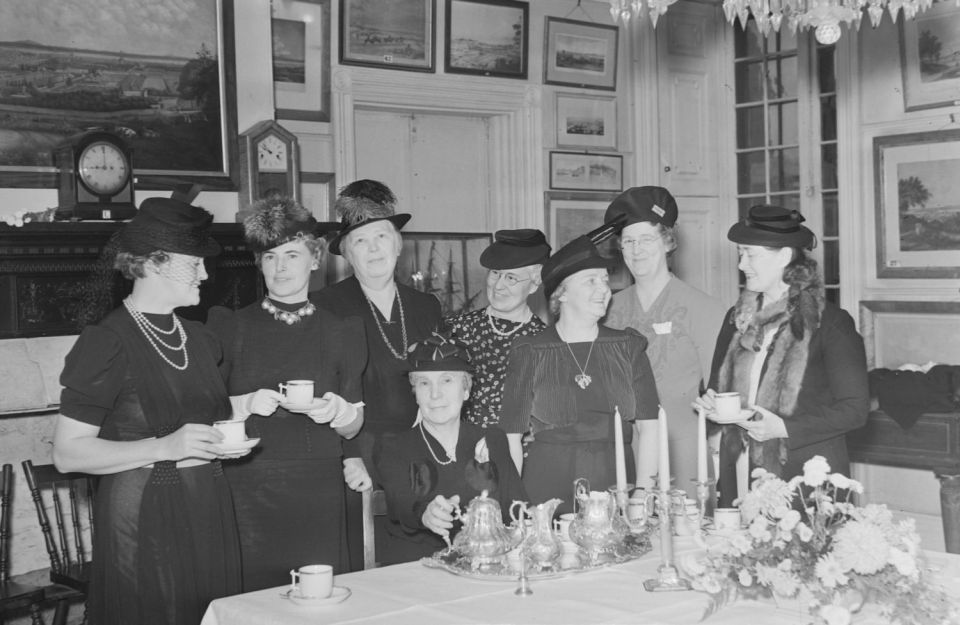
Members of a Catholic Women's Club drinking tea in 1940

Women's suffrage was achieved during World War I. Suffrage activism began during the later decades of the Victorian era. In 1883, the Toronto Women's Literary and Social Progress Club met and established the Canadian Women's Suffrage Association.

=== WCTU ===
Before the 1870s, there were few organizations for women, apart from charitable groups associated with particular denominations and largely under the control of the male ministry. The main breakthrough came with the formation of the Woman's Christian Temperance Union (WCTU), in the 1870s. The movement began in Ohio and rapidly spread internationally. It started a chapter in Ontario in 1874 and became a national union in 1885; it reached 16,000 members across Canada in 1914. The central demand was for prohibition, a provincial law that was designed to minimize the power of the liquor interests, reduce violence among men, reduce violence towards wives and children, and keep more money in the family. The leadership in most numbers came from evangelical Protestant churches, especially the Methodists and Baptists. Episcopalians seldom joined, and Catholics almost never joined. They held that the plurality should be under the control of the churches, not under the control of private societies or the government. The WCTU took the lead in demanding votes for women. Its argument was based on a maternal feminist position to the effect that women possessed superior moral standards, especially regarding issues affecting the home and family life, and needed the votes to guarantee that the government supported proper public morals.

Starting in the late 1870s, the Ontario WCTU demanded that schools teach "scientific temperance", which reinforced moralistic temperance messages with the study of anatomy and hygiene, as a compulsory subject in schools. Although initially successful in convincing the Ontario Department of Education to adopt scientific temperance as part of the curriculum, teachers opposed the plan and refused to implement it. The WCTU then moved to dry up the province through government action. They started with "local option" laws, which allowed local governments to prohibit the sale of liquor. Many towns and rural areas went dry in the years before 1914, but the larger cities did not.

The WCTU was always committed to prohibition and suffrage, but it had alternative priorities as well. For example, the Alberta WCTU stressed prohibition, women's suffrage, and temperance education. Its leader was Nellie McClung (1873–1951), a best-selling novelist and social activist who led the struggle for women's suffrage in Alberta and Canada; in 1921, she was elected to the Alberta legislature. Meanwhile, the emphasis of the Saskatchewan group was charitable activities, due to the interests of its leadership, immigration and rural needs, and its commitment to Saskatchewan's "agrarian destiny". Many chapters were involved in the local, provincial, and federal campaigns for age restrictions on smoking and cigarette prohibition during 1892–1914.

=== Local clubs ===
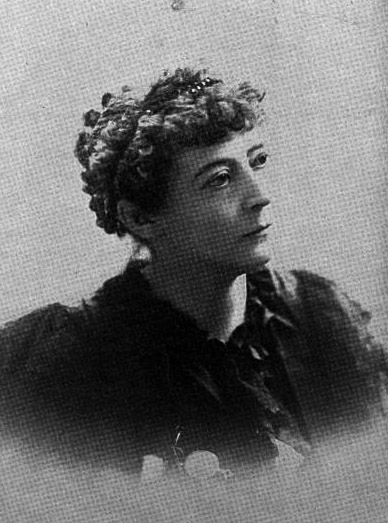
Kit Coleman (1856–1915) was the world's first accredited female war correspondent, covering the Spanish–American War, and was the first president of the Canadian Women's Press Club.

The Calgary Current Events Club, started in 1927 by seven women, rapidly gained popularity with professional women of the city. In 1929, the group changed its name to the Calgary Business and Professional Women's Club (BPW) in response to a call for a national federation of such groups. Members traveled to London, England in 1929 to make the case for recognizing women as full legal citizens. In the 1930s, the group addressed many of the controversial political issues of the day, including the introduction of a minimum wage, fair unemployment insurance legislation, the compulsory medical examination of school children, and the requirement of a medical certificate for marriage. The national convention of the BPW was held in Calgary in 1935. The club actively supported Canadian overseas forces in the Second World War. At first, most of the members were secretaries and office workers; more recently, it has been dominated by executives and professionals. The organization continues to attend to women's economic and social issues.

Lauretta Hughes Kneil was a representative activist in her years in Edmonton, 1909 to 1923. Her work in the Catholic Women's League and the local chapter of the National Council of Women of Canada provided training in civic affairs, public speaking, and government lobbying that proved useful in her charity work. Kneil was appointed to the Board of Public Welfare in 1914, became a provincial inspector of factories in 1917, and helped promote the Mothers' Allowance Act of 1919.

Women journalists formed the Canadian Women's Press Club (CWPC) to demand the right to free railway passes to cover the 1904 World's Fair in St. Louis, Missouri. It had local chapters in major cities and was later renamed the Media Club of Canada. The first president of the CWPC was Kit Coleman (1864–1915), and the nom de plume of newspaper columnist was Kathleen Blake Coleman. Born in Ireland, Coleman was the world's first accredited female war correspondent, covering the Spanish–American War for The Toronto Mail in 1898. Ella Cora Hind (1861–1942) was Western Canada's first woman journalist and a women's rights activist.

== Labour unions ==
In Nova Scotia, United Mine Workers took control of the coal miners in 1919. Women played an important, though quiet, role in support of the union movement in coal towns during the troubled 1920s and 1930s. They never worked in the mines, but they provided psychological support, especially during strikes when the pay packets did not arrive. They were the family financiers and encouraged other wives who otherwise might have coaxed their menfolk to accept company terms. Women's labor leagues organized a variety of social, educational, and fund-raising functions. Women also violently confronted "scabs", policemen, and soldiers. They had to stretch the food dollar and show inventiveness in clothing their families.

== Feminism and woman suffrage ==
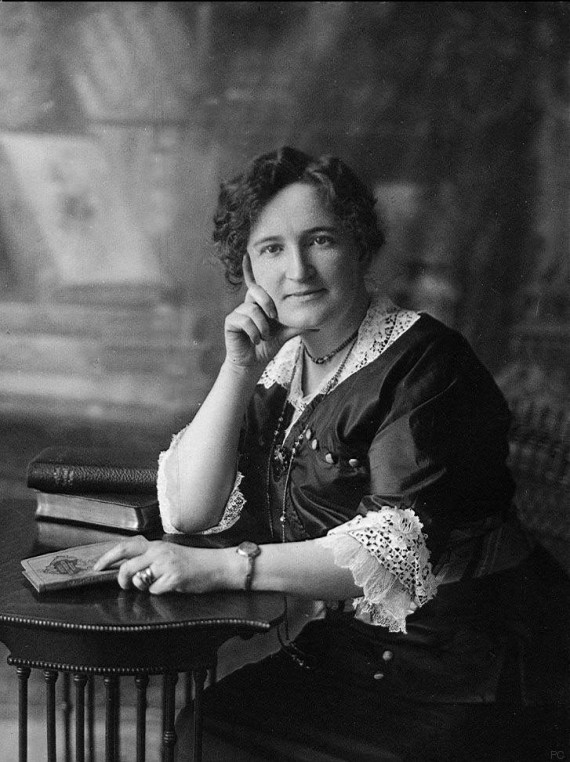
Nellie McClung (1873–1951) was a Canadian feminist, politician, author, and social activist. She was a member of The Famous Five.

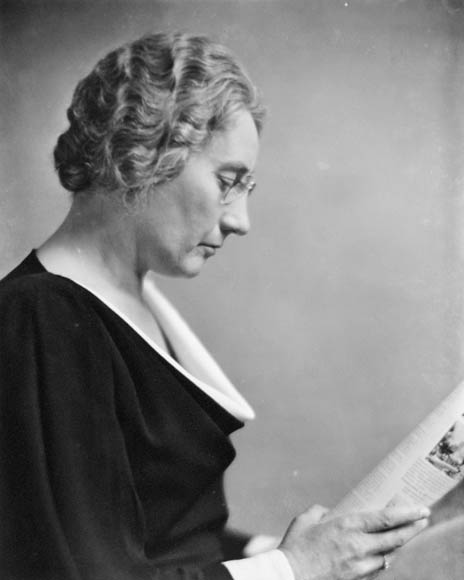
Agnes Macphail (1890–1954) was the first woman to be elected to the House of Commons of Canada, and one of the first two women elected to the Legislative Assembly of Ontario.

The first wave of feminism started in the late 19th century. Women's legal rights made slow progress throughout the 19th century. In 1859, Upper Canada passed a law allowing married women to own property. In 1885, Alberta passed a law allowing unmarried women who owned property the right to vote and hold office in school matters. This early activism was focused on increasing women’s role in public life, with goals including women’s suffrage, increased property rights, increased access to education, and recognition as "persons" under the law. This early iteration of Canadian feminism was largely based in maternal feminism: the idea that women are natural caregivers and "mothers of the nation" who should participate in public life because of their perceived propensity for decisions that will result in good care of society. In this view, women were seen to be a civilizing force on society, which was a significant part of women’s engagement in missionary work and in the Woman’s Christian Temperance Union (WCTU).

Religion was an important factor in the early stages of the Canadian women’s movement. Some of the earliest groups of organized women came together for a religious purpose. When women were rejected as missionaries by their Churches and missionary societies, they started their own missionary societies and raised funds to send female missionaries abroad. Some of them raised enough to train some of their missionaries as teachers or doctors.

Women's political status without the vote was vigorously promoted by the National Council of Women of Canada from 1894 to 1918. It promoted a vision of "transcendent citizenship" for women. The ballot was not needed, for citizenship was to be exercised through personal influence and moral suasion, through the election of men with strong moral character and through raising public-spirited sons. The National Council position was integrated into its nation-building program that sought to uphold Canada as a white settler nation. While the women's suffrage movement was important for extending the political rights of white women, it was also authorized through race-based arguments that linked white women's enfranchisement to the need to protect the nation from "racial degeneration".

Women sometimes did have a local vote in some provinces, as in Ontario from 1850, where women who owned property could vote for school trustees. By 1900, other provinces adopted similar provisions, and in 1916, Manitoba took the lead in extending full woman's suffrage. Simultaneously, suffragists gave strong support to the prohibition movement, especially in Ontario and the Western provinces.

The Military Voters Act of 1917 gave the vote to Canadian women who were war widows or had sons or husbands serving overseas. Unionists Prime Minister Sir Robert Borden pledged himself during the 1917 campaign to equal suffrage for women. After his landslide victory, he introduced a bill in 1918 for extending the franchise to women. This passed without division, but it did not apply to Quebec. The women of Quebec did not obtain full suffrage until 1940. The first woman elected to Parliament was Agnes Macphail in Ontario in 1921.

Province	Date of Women's Suffrage	Date of Women's Ability to Hold Office
Manitoba	January 28, 1916	January 28, 1916
Saskatchewan	March 14, 1916	March 14, 1916
Alberta	April 19, 1916	April 19, 1916*
British Columbia	April 5, 1917	April 5, 1917
Ontario	April 12, 1917	April 24, 1919
Nova Scotia	April 26, 1918	April 26, 1918
New Brunswick	April 17, 1919	March 9, 1934
Prince Edward Island	May 3, 1922	May 3, 1922
Newfoundland	April 13, 1925	April 13, 1925
Quebec	April 25, 1940	April 25, 1940
Dominion of Canada (federal government)	Relatives of individuals in the armed forces – September 20, 1917. All female British subjects in Canada, May 24, 1918	July 7, 1919**

- First women elected in the British Empire were two Alberta women (Louise McKinney and Roberta MacAdams) elected in 1917.
  - First woman elected to the House of Commons was Progressive candidate Agnes MacPhail, elected in 1921.

== First World War ==
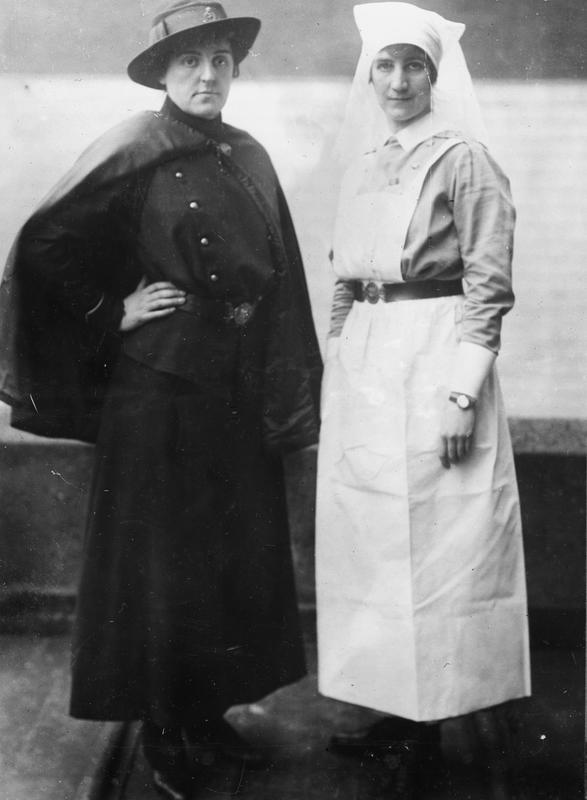
Type of uniform worn by Canadian Army Medical Corps Nursing Service and Mess Uniform during the First World War

The First World War opened up many new opportunities for paid employment and unpaid volunteer work for women. They maintained families and supported morale with so many menfolk gone.

About 3,411 women became nurses serving in uniform with the services. When war broke out, Laura Gamble enlisted in the Canadian Army Medical Corps, because she knew that her experience in a Toronto hospital would be an asset to the war efforts. Health care practitioners had to deal with medical anomalies they had never seen before the First World War. Poison gas caused injuries that treatment protocols had not yet been developed for. The only treatment that soothed the Canadian soldiers affected by the gas was the constant care they received from the nurses.

On the Canadian home front, there were many ways in which women could participate in the war effort. Lois Allan joined the Farm Services Corps in 1918 to replace the men who were sent to the front. Allan was placed at E. B. Smith and Sons, where she hulled strawberries for jam. Jobs were opened up at factories as well, as industrial production increased. Work days for these women consisted of ten to twelve hours, six days a week. Because the days consisted of long, monotonous work, many women made up parodies of popular songs to get through the day and boost morale. Depending on the area of Canada, some women were given a choice to sleep in either barracks or tents at the factory or farm that they were employed at. According to a brochure that was issued by the Canadian Department of Public Works, there were several areas in which it was appropriate for women to work. These were:

1. On fruit or vegetable farms.
2. In the camps to cook for workers.
3. On mixed and dairy farms.
4. In the farmhouse to help feed those who are raising the crops.
5. In canneries to preserve the fruit and vegetables.
6. To take charge of milk routes.

In addition, many women were involved in charitable organizations, such as the Ottawa Women’s Canadian Club, which helped provide the needs of soldiers, families of soldiers, and the victims of war. Women were deemed "soldiers on the home front", encouraged to use less or nearly nothing, and to be frugal in order to save supplies for the war efforts.

== Second World War ==
The Canadian Women's Auxiliary Air Force (CWAAF) was formed in 1941 as an element of the Royal Canadian Air Force. Changing to the Women's Division (WD) in 1942, this unit was formed to take over positions that would allow more men to participate in combat and training duties. Among the many jobs carried out by WD personnel, they became clerks, drivers, fabric workers, hairdressers, hospital assistants, instrument mechanics, parachute riggers, photographers, air photo interpreters, intelligence officers, instructors, weather observers, pharmacists, Wireless operators, and Service Police. Although the Women's Division was discontinued in 1946 after wartime service, women were not permitted to enter the RCAF until 1951.

An element of the Royal Canadian Navy, the Women's Royal Canadian Naval Service (WRCNS) was active during the Second World War and post-war years. This unit was part of the Royal Canadian Naval Reserve until unification in 1968. The WRCNS (or Wrens) was modelled on the Women's Royal Naval Service, which had been active during the First World War and then revived in 1939. The Royal Canadian Navy was slow to create a women's service and established the WRCNS in July 1942, nearly a year after the Canadian Women's Army Corps and the Royal Canadian Air Force Women's Division. By the end of the war, however, nearly 7,000 women had served with the WRCNS in 39 different trades.

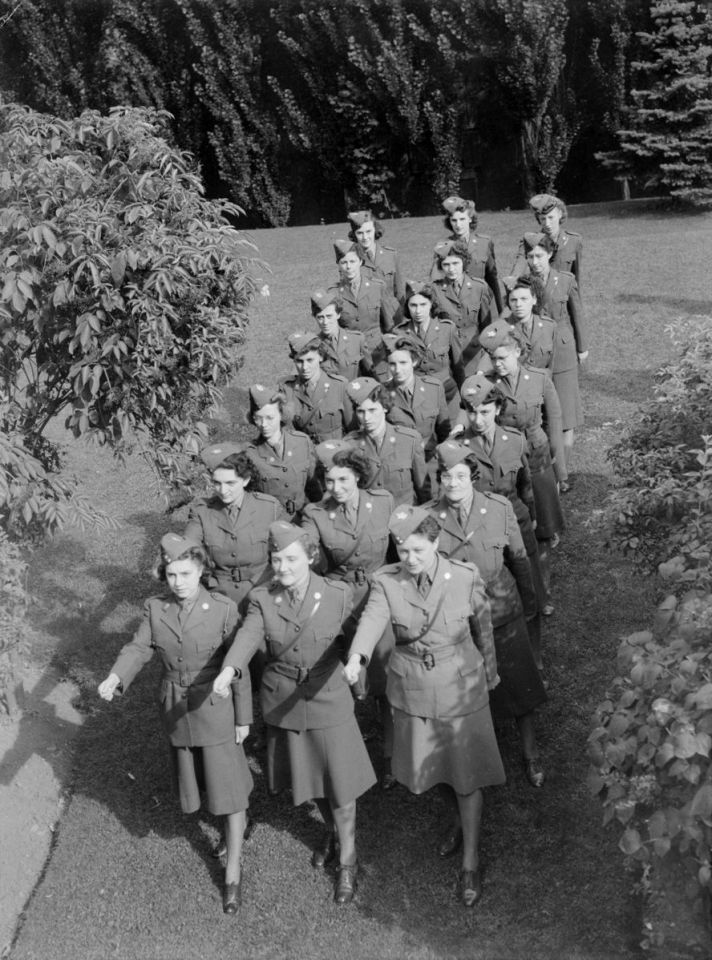
Members of the Canadian Women's Army Corps in August 1942.

The Canadian Women's Army Corps was a non-combatant branch of the Canadian Army for women established during the Second World War to release men from non-combatant roles and thereby expand Canada's war effort. Most women served in Canada, but some served overseas, mostly in roles such as secretaries, mechanics, cooks, and so on. The CWAC was finally abolished as a separate corps in 1964, when women were fully integrated into the Canadian armed forces.

Women's military involvement paved the way for women’s future involvement in combative roles. With tens of thousands of women involved in these organizations, it provided Canadian women with the opportunity to do their part in a global conflict. Although their involvement was critical to the allied victory, it did not change the power dynamics within Canada, regarding military involvement. Sexism returned with full force following the Second World War, forcing women in Canada, and across the world, back into their homes and kitchens. "Women's admittance to the army in World War II had not brought about a change in the distribution of power between the sexes in Canada." The freedom they had experienced during the war was over—it was time to return to their "normal" and "proper" domestic duties.

The Second World War provided women with the first large-scale opportunity to leave the homes of their parents, husbands, and children to engage in paid labour. Never before had this happened at such a high rate for women. This mass exodus of women from Canadian households allowed the women to forge new identities as military service women and munitions workers because of their newfound ability to earn a paycheque doing work in the public sphere.

== Sports ==
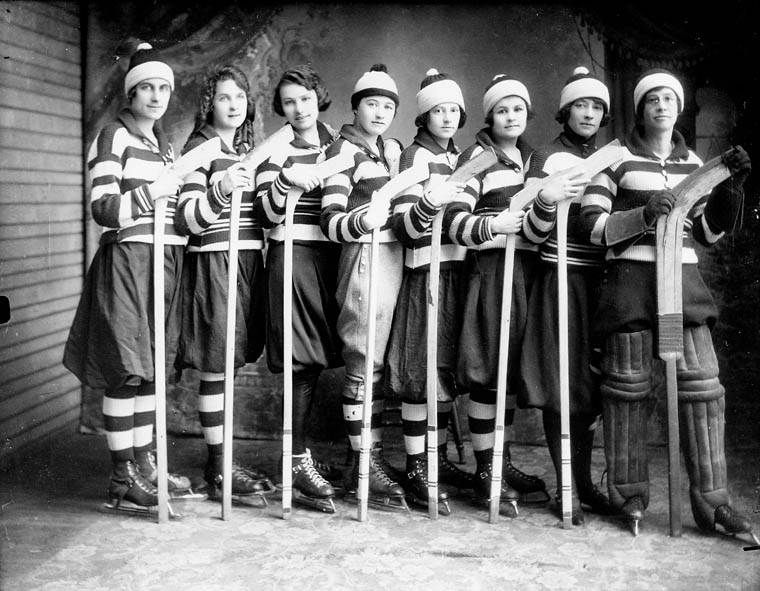
A women's ice hockey team in 1921

Sports are high priority in Canadian culture, but women were long relegated to second-class status. There were regional differences as well, with the eastern provinces emphasizing a more feminine "girls rule" game of basketball, while the Western provinces preferred identical rules. Girls' and women's sport has traditionally been slowed down by a series of factors: girls and women historically have low levels of interest and participation; there were very few women in leadership positions in academic administration, student affairs, or athletics; there were few women coaches; the media strongly emphasized men's sports as a demonstration of masculinity, suggesting that women seriously interested in sports were crossing gender lines; the male sports establishment was actively hostile; and staunch feminists dismissed sports as unworthy of their support. Women's progress was uphill; they first had to counter the widespread notion that women's bodies were so restricted and delicate that vigorous physical activity was dangerous. These notions where first challenged by the "new woman" around 1900. These women started with bicycling; they rode into new gender spaces in education, work, and suffrage.

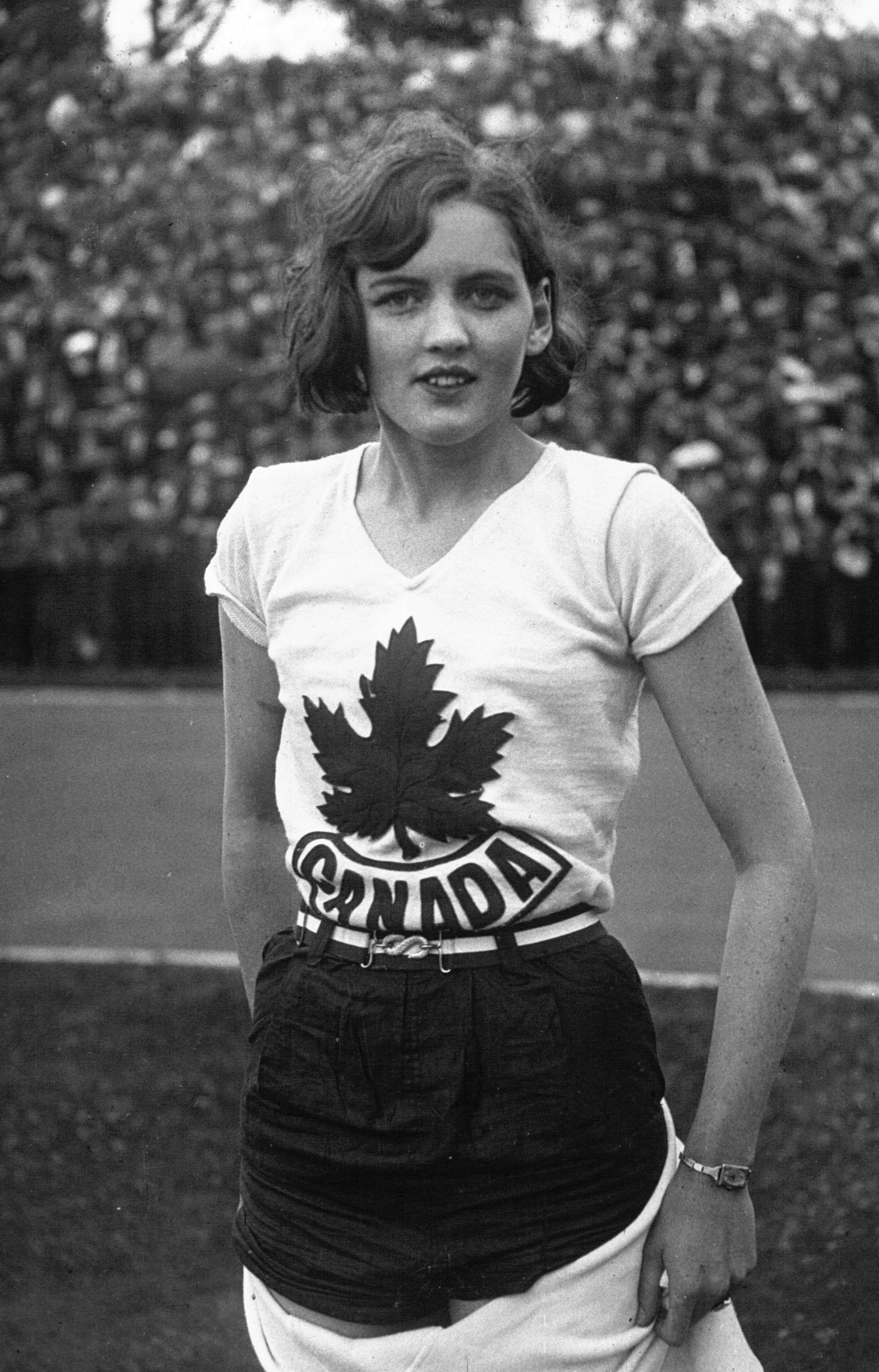
Ethel Catherwood won Canada's first Olympic gold medal in an individual event in women's high jump at the 1928 Amsterdam Olympics.

The 1920s marked a breakthrough for women, including working class young women in addition to the pioneering middle class sportswomen. The Women's Amateur Federation of Canada (WAAF) was formed in 1926 to make new opportunities possible, particularly in international competition. The WAAF worked to rebut the stereotype that vigorous physical activity and intense competition was "unwomanly". One tactic was to set up a system of medical supervision for all women athletes. The WAAF forged an alliance with supportive men who dominated the Amateur Athletic Union of Canada. This allowed women to compete in the Olympics and the British Empire Games.

Many barriers fell in the 1920s: the Edmonton Grads became the world champions of women's basketball, the first Canadian women participated in the Olympics, and women sportswriters, such as Phyllis Griffiths, were hired to cover their feats on the sports pages.

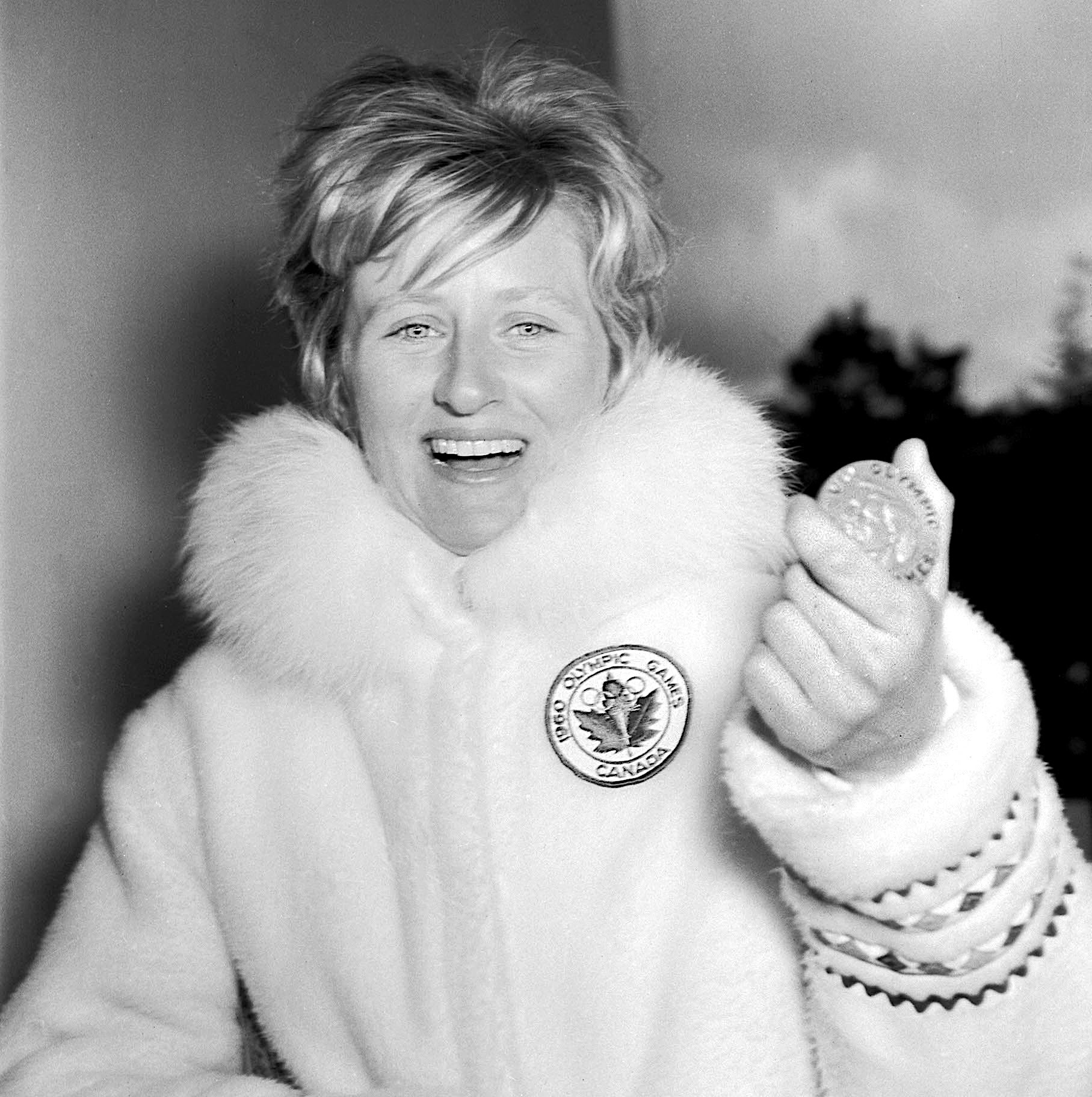
Anne Heggtveit won Canada's first Olympic gold in alpine skiing at the 1960 Squaw Valley Olympics.

The 1930s brought setbacks, as critics recommended non-competitive athletic activities as the recreation most suited to women. During the 1930s, a team of women from the small town of Preston, Ontario, overcame the difficulty of obtaining adequate ice time for practice and the challenge of raising adequate funds from their small fan base. The Rivulettes dominated women's ice hockey, winning ten provincial championships and four of the six Dominion championships. With money short during the Great Depression, after 1939, the hyper-masculinity of the Second World War blocked women's opportunities. Women's hockey largely disappeared during the Second World War. After the war, the back-to-the-family conservatism put women's sports in the shadows. The feminists of the 1970s rarely helped promote women's breakthroughs in sports. Nevertheless, more and more women engaged in aerobics and organized sport. Figure skater Barbara Ann Scott was the outstanding female athlete of the 1940s, as the 1948 Olympic champion, a two-time World champion (1947–1948), and a four-time Canadian national champion (1944–46, 48) in ladies' singles. She was very heavily covered by the media. However, it focused less on her sportsmanship and athletic achievements and more on her beauty and her "sweetheart" image.

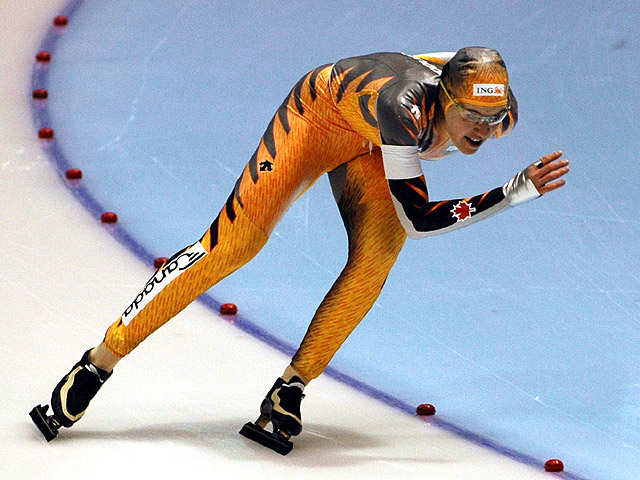
Clara Hughes skating in 2007

Change for women in sport began slowly but then accelerated after 1980. The Fitness and Amateur Sport Act of 1961 (Bill C-131) and the report of the Royal Commission on the Status of Women in 1970 marked major advances. Perhaps the most critical development came in 1974, when Marion Lay and the federal government’s Fitness and Amateur Sport Branch (FASB) sponsored a National Conference on Women and Sport. It brought together coaches, academic administrators, and athletes to talk about the issues raised by the Royal Commission and to chart a way forward. Even so, there was no way to monitor the process and implement the recommendations. The 1980s accelerated the movement forward with the Sport Canada’s Women’s Program in 1980, the Female Athlete Conference in 1981, the Women in Sport program in 1981, and the Constitution Act of 1982. In 1981, Abby Hoffman, a former Olympian, was named director general of Sport Canada. Its "Policy on Women's Sport" called for equality. The AAU of Canada now became more supportive. Court cases nailed down the women's right to participate. In the provinces, human rights commissions addressed dozens of sport-related equity cases for women. Gender barriers in sports became a political topic, as shown by the Minister’s Task Force Report in 1992 and the landmark decision of the Canadian Sport Council to include gender equity quotas in their operating principles. By the 1990s, women proved eager to enter formerly all-male sports such as ice hockey, rugby, and wrestling. Their activism and their prowess on the playing field eroded old stereotypes and opened up new social roles for the woman athlete on campus and in her community. New problems emerged for sportswomen trying to achieve equal status with sportsmen: raising money, attracting popular audiences, and winning sponsors.

Harrigan reviews the emergence of women's athletics in higher education during 1961–2001. The establishment of the National Fitness and Amateur Sport Advisory Council helped women's intercollegiate sports to gain momentum. Simultaneously, there was a rise in the proportion of women in the student bodies, which enhanced the visibility of their sports. To overcome institutional inertia, women concentrated on organizing their sports and raising the consciousness of both male and female students. In 1969, the Canadian Women's Intercollegiate Athletic Union was formed to oversee events and sanction national championships; it merged with the Canadian Intercollegiate Athletic Union in 1978. Women increasingly became more active after 1980.

== Violence against women ==
Attention to violence against women in Canada started to gain prominence in the 1960s, 1970s and 1980s. In 1982, after MP Margaret Mitchell raised the issue of violence against women in parliament and was laughed at by male MPs in the House of Commons, there was public outcry over the incident, and women's groups started lobbying the government to take action on the issue.

The École Polytechnique massacre is probably the most infamous case of violence against women in Canada. In December 1989, 25-year-old Marc Lépine opened fire at the École Polytechnique in Montreal, Quebec, killing 14 women, before committing suicide. He began his attack by entering a classroom at the university, where he separated the male and female students. After claiming that he was "fighting feminism" and calling the women "a bunch of feminists", he shot all nine women in the room, killing six. He then moved through corridors, the cafeteria, and another classroom, specifically targeting women to shoot. Overall, he killed fourteen women and injured ten other women and four men in just under 20 minutes before turning the gun on himself. His suicide note claimed political motives and blamed feminists for ruining his life. The note included a list of 19 Quebec women whom Lépine considered to be feminists and apparently wished to kill.

Violence against Aboriginal women in Canada is a serious issue. According to Amnesty International, "The scale and severity of violence faced by Indigenous women and girls in Canada—First Nations, Inuit and Métis—constitutes a national human rights crisis."

The BC Missing Women Investigation is an ongoing criminal investigation into the disappearance of at least 60 women from Vancouver's Downtown Eastside, from the early 1980s through 2002. Many of the missing women were severely disadvantaged, drug-addicted sex workers from Vancouver's Downtown Eastside. Much of the investigation centred on Robert William Pickton, who is a serial killer who was convicted in 2007 for the murders of six women and sentenced to life imprisonment.

Many of the issues facing indigenous women in Canada have been addressed via the Murdered and Missing Indigenous Women (MMIW) initiatives. Hundreds of Native Canadian women have gone missing or been killed in the past 30 years, with little representation or attention from the government. Efforts to make the Canadian public aware of these women's disappearances have mostly been led by Aboriginal communities, who often reached across provinces to support one another. In 2015, Prime Minister Stephen Harper commented that the issue of murdered and missing indigenous women was "not high on our radar", prompting outrage in already frustrated indigenous communities. A few months later, Prime Minister Justin Trudeau launched an official inquiry into the murdered and missing indigenous women.

Russell Williams is a Canadian convicted murderer, rapist, and former Colonel in the Canadian Forces, who targeted women. He was sentenced in 2010 to two life sentences for first-degree murder, two 10-year sentences for other sexual assaults, two 10-year sentences for forcible confinement, and 82 one-year sentences for breaking and entering, all to be served concurrently.

== Prostitution ==
Following Confederation in 1867, the laws were consolidated in the Criminal Code. These dealt principally with pimping, procuring, operating brothels, and soliciting. Most amendments to date have dealt with the latter, originally classified as a vagrancy offence. This was amended to soliciting in 1972 and communicating in 1985. Since the Charter of Rights and Freedoms became law in 1982, the constitutionality of Canada's prostitution laws have been challenged on a number of occasions.

Up to the 1880s, prostitution was tolerated in the Prairie Provinces. Before 1909, there were few arrests and even fewer fines for prostitution, in part because those caught were encouraged to leave town rather than be jailed. As the population became more settled, however, public opinion regarding this resource for itinerant men turned hostile. For example, a smallpox epidemic in the red light districts of Calgary ignited a crackdown, as demanded by middle-class women reformers. Local chapters of the Woman's Christian Temperance Union vigorously opposed both saloons and prostitution, and they called for woman suffrage as a tool to end those evils.

== Historiography and recognition ==
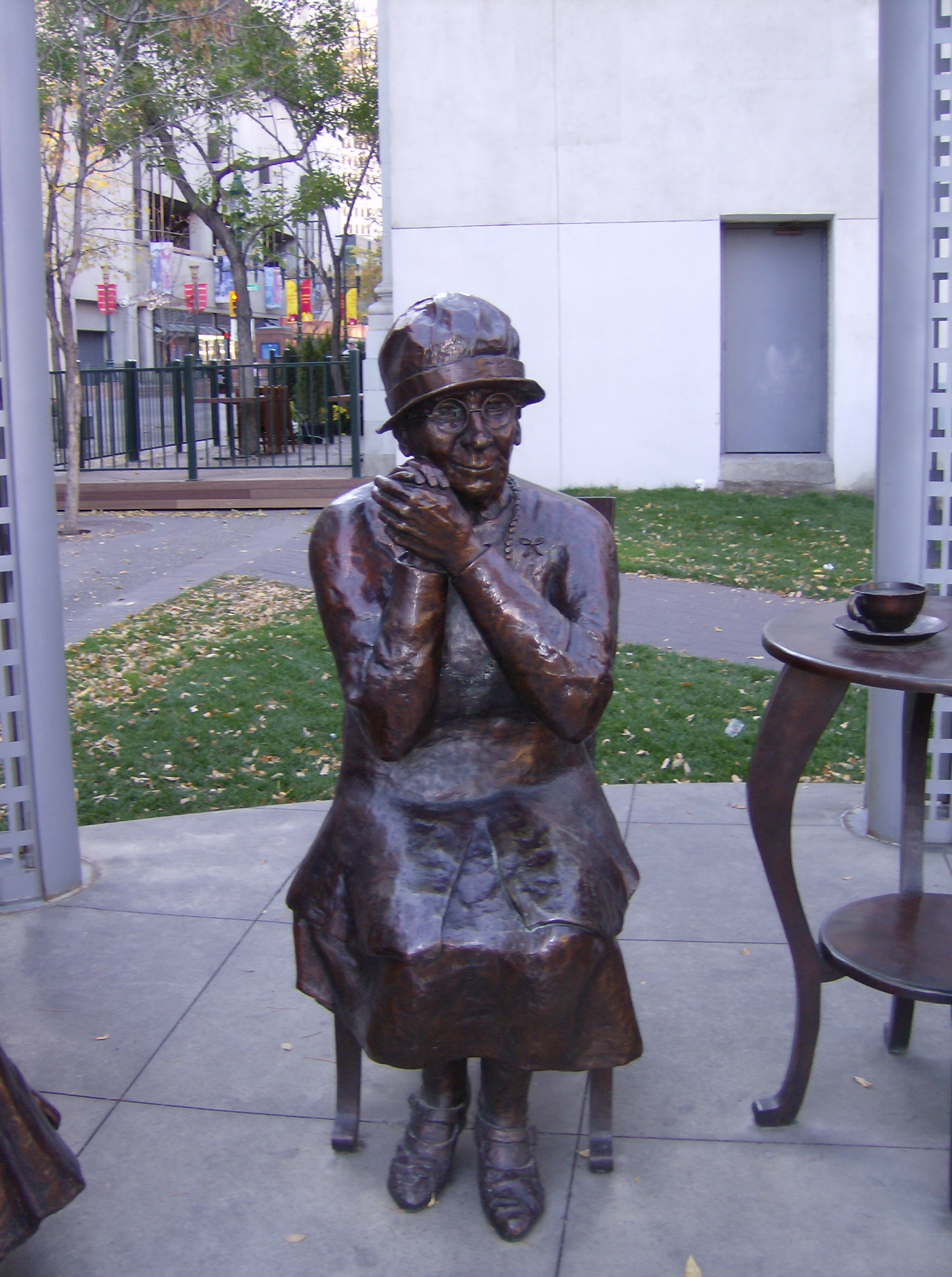
Statue of Louise McKinney in Calgary, Alberta. Louise McKinney (1868–1931) was a provincial politician and women's rights activist from Alberta, and a member of The Famous Five.

The woman's history movement began in the 1970s and grew rapidly across Canadian universities, attracting support from history departments and other disciplines as well. The Canadian Committee on Women's History (CCWH) was founded in 1975. Franca Iacovetta reported in 2007:

Although the most prestigious awards and endowed chairs still go mostly to men, and men still outnumber women at the full professor rank, the greater influence of feminist historians within the wider profession is evident in their increased presence as journal and book series editors, the many scholarly prizes, the strong presence of women's and gender history on conference programs, and the growing number of their students who are in full-time positions.

— Franca Iacovetta

=== Memorials ===
A memorial in Salmon Arm, British Columbia, was dedicated on 14 August 2000 to all Canadian women who served in the First and Second World Wars and the Korean War.

A 6′4″ high bronze memorial statue "Canadian Women’s Army Corps" (2000) by André Gauthier (sculptor) in front of the Kitchener Armoury in Kitchener, Ontario, honours the women who served in the Canadian Women's Army Corps between 1941 and 1945. It also lists those who died while in service.

A bandstand in Veterans Memorial Park in Langford, British Columbia, was dedicated in 2001 to all Canadian Women Mariners who served their country in wartime. A plaque lists eight of these courageous women who were killed in action.

The first public monument erected to a woman in Canada was erected in 1870 in Pugwash, Nova Scotia, by the Legislature of Nova Scotia. The Crowley Memorial commemorates the heroic death of Mary Elizabeth Crowley, who died on October 15, 1869, aged 12 years, after having rescued her younger brother and sister from the flames of her parents' home.

== See also ==
- Abortion in Canada
- Catholic sisters and nuns in Canada
- Feminism in Canada
- History of American women
- History of women in the United Kingdom
- Historiography of Canada#Women
- Women in the Victorian era#Canada
- Women in Canadian politics
- Women in the Americas
