= Abortion trial of Emily Stowe =

Judicial decision regarding abortion in Canada

- Court: Ontario County Court
- Decided: 1879
- Defendant: Emily Stowe

The abortion trial of Emily Stowe was a famous early Canadian judicial decision on abortion in Canada. The case involved Dr. Emily Stowe, one of Canada's first female doctors. Stowe was acquitted, which was a rare outcome for abortion trials in the nineteenth century.

== Background ==
The case began after one Sarah Ann Lovell, an unmarried teenager, was found dead in August 1879. It was discovered after she had died that she had been pregnant. Furthermore, she had been a patient of Dr. Emily Stowe in May. Stowe claimed she had first resisted performing an abortion, but Lovell seemed emotionally distressed and threatened suicide. As this was before the quickening, an abortion at this stage would be seen by some as more legitimate. Lovell could have been turned over to the authorities, however, Stowe wound up prescribing hellebore, cantharides, and myrrh. While allegedly capable of aborting the fetus, Stowe claimed these drugs were prescribed in such a small dose that they were intended as a placebo. Furthermore, drugs prescribed in May would not cause death in August.

While it is unlikely that Stowe was pro-choice, this view of her was pushed by those who saw her as responsible for Lovell's death. The case soon achieved fame. A jury for the coroner wound up deciding Lovell was poisoned by drugs meant for an abortion, but they blamed Lovell and/or unidentified people rather than Stowe.

== Trial ==
Afterwards, the Crown indicted Stowe for having "administered and caused to be taken poisons with intent to procure a miscarriage", which had been outlawed since 1869. Stowe could have gone to prison for life for this. The intent was to discourage abortion in a widely publicized trial. Stowe pleaded not guilty in an Ontario County Court. The coroner was called to testify, and he confessed he had lost all medical evidence. Another doctor was accused of being antagonistic to Stowe because she was a woman doctor, and of calling Stowe a "bitch".

Finally, the defence under Dalton McCarthy argued that whatever drugs may have been prescribed, Stowe did not administer them nor cause them to be administered. While supplying such drugs was also a crime (with a lesser penalty), Stowe had not been charged with it. Moreover, it was possible that a person would disregard such a prescription. The judge agreed and wound up deciding the jury need not even decide the case, as there was no case against Stowe to make. The judge also questioned whether women should be doctors. Legal historian Constance Backhouse has speculated that the anti-woman sentiment among Stowe's opponents might have been so extreme and offensive that it helped Stowe's case.

In 1880, Stowe was granted her medical licence by the College of Physicians and Surgeons of Ontario, making her the second licensed female physician in Canada after Jennie Kidd Trout.

== See also ==
- List of notable Canadian lower court cases
- Canadian Women's Suffrage Association
