= Jennie Kidd Trout =

Canadian physician

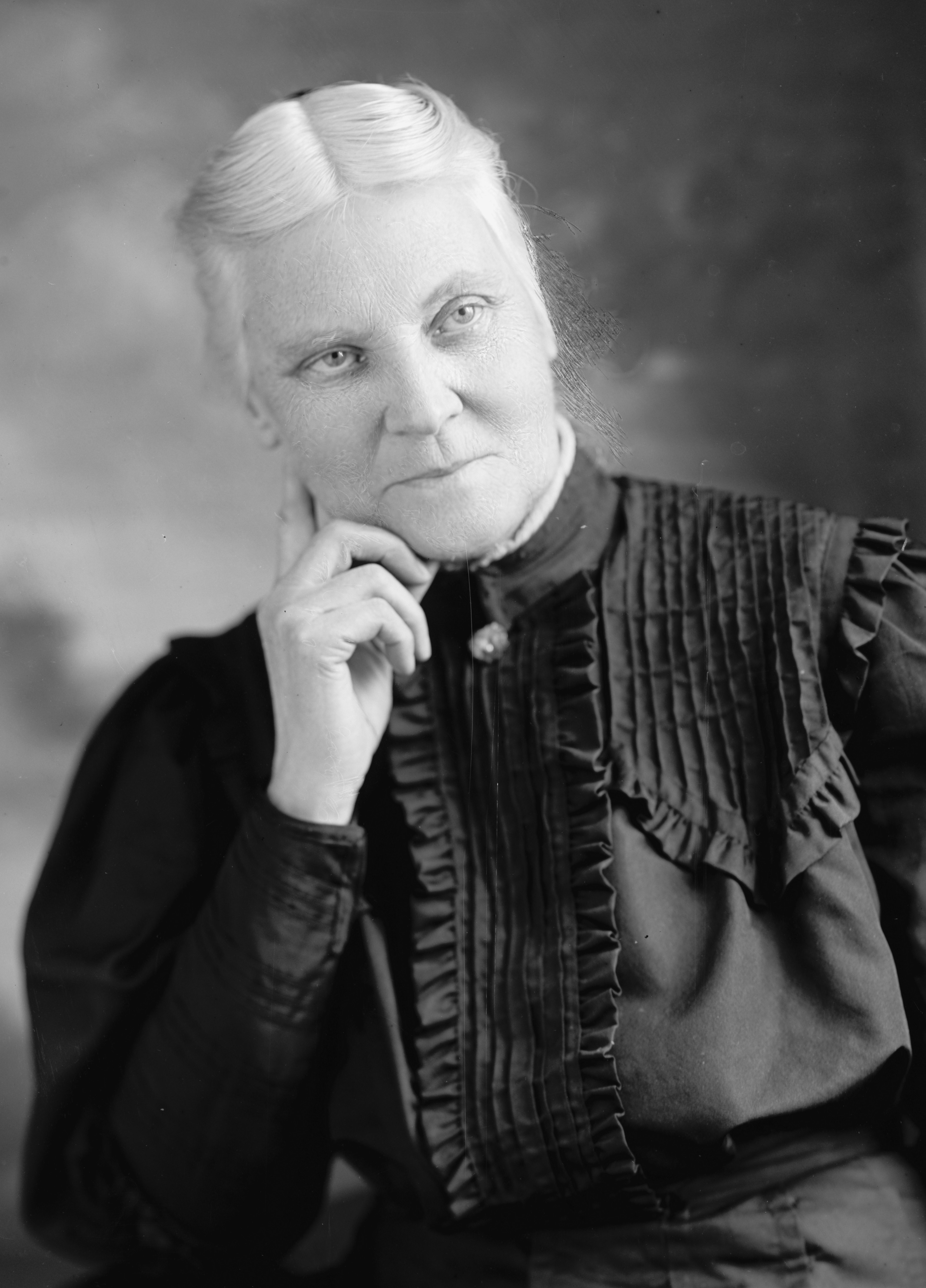
- Born: Jennie Kidd Gowanlock; April 21, 1841; Kelso, Scotland
- Died: November 10, 1921 (aged 80); Los Angeles, California
- Occupation: Physician

Jennie Kidd Trout (born Gowanlock; April 21, 1841 – November 10, 1921) was the first woman in Canada to become a licensed medical doctor, on March 11, 1875. Trout was the only woman in Canada licensed to practice medicine until July 1880, when Emily Stowe completed the official qualifications.

== Biography ==
Born in Wooden Mills, Kelso, Scotland, Jennie (whose name is variously spelled 'Jenny') moved with her parents to Canada in 1847, settling near Stratford, Ontario. Trout had taken a course in teaching after graduation, and had taught until her marriage to Edward Trout. She married Trout in 1865 and thereafter moved to Toronto, where Edward ran a newspaper.

Motivated by her own chronic illnesses, she decided on a medical career, passing her matriculation exam in 1871 and studying medicine at the University of Toronto. Trout and Emily Jennings Stowe were together the first women admitted to the Toronto School of Medicine, by special arrangement. Stowe, however, refused to sit her exams in protest of the school's demeaning treatment of the two women. Trout later transferred to the Woman's Medical College of Pennsylvania, where she earned her M.D. on March 11, 1875 and became the first licensed female physician in Canada.

Trout then opened the Therapeutic and Electrical Institute in Toronto, which specialized in treatments for women involving "galvanic baths or electricity." For six years, she also ran a free dispensary for the poor at the same location. The Institute was quite successful, later opening branches in Brantford and Hamilton, Ontario.

Due to poor health, Trout retired in 1882 to Palma Sola, Florida. She was later instrumental in the establishment of a medical school for women at Queen's University in Kingston. Her family travelled extensively between Florida and Ontario, and later moved to Los Angeles, California, where she died in 1921.

In 1991, Canada Post issued a postage stamp in her honour to commemorate her as the first woman licensed to practise medicine in Canada.

On April 21, 2018, Google celebrated her 177th birthday with a Google Doodle.

== See also ==
- Canadian Women's Suffrage Association
