= Jessie Turnbull =

Canadian woman's rights activist

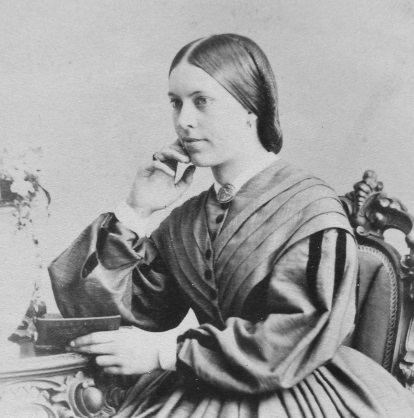
- Jessie Turnbull in 1863
- Born: December 1845; Canada
- Died: 1 June 1920; Brandon, Manitoba, Canada

Jessie Turnbull (December 1845 – 1 June 1920), also known as Jessie McEwen, was a Canadian women's rights activist.

== Life ==
Turnbull was born in 1845, probably in Montreal. In her first job after leaving college, she was employed under the leadership of Egerton Ryerson to tour schools to educate parents of the importance of educating girls as well as boys. Turnbull married in businessman Donald McEwan 1868, and they lived in Toronto, later moving to Montreal and then back to Toronto.

The Toronto Women's Literary Guild was established in 1877 to campaign for women's rights and for improved working conditions. Turnbull and Dr. Emily Howard Stowe, Canada's second licensed female physician, were founders. The guild had some success in improving access to higher education for women. It was renamed the Canadian Women's Suffrage Association in 1883 with Jessie (McEwen) Turnbull as its first president. The Toronto-based association worked towards opening up education to women, and allowing women to advance as professionals, particularly as doctors.

In 1884 Turnbull moved to Brandon in Manitoba where her husband had a farm and they built a large house named Tullichewen in 1893. In November 1895 she chaired a meeting that heard Ishbel Hamilton-Gordon, Marchioness of Aberdeen and Temair, who was the Viceregal consort of Canada, talk about the National Council of Women of Canada. Turnbull agreed to become the President of the Brandon branch of the group. The Brandon group were successful in campaigning for many improvements. This was not because of Turnbull's demands but due to her persuasive powers. Turnbull was the vice-president of the National Council in 1900 and she was president of the Brandon branch until 1916.

Turnbull moved to Brandon, Manitoba, in 1919 and died there on 1 June 1920. Journalist Lillian Beynon Thomas wrote in 1915 that if the public were asked to name which "woman who has done most to shape...Canada ...[no] name would stand higher than that of Jessie Turnbull McEwen".

== Sources ==
- "Dr. Emily Howard Stowe". Library and Archives Canada. 21 July 2008.
- Freeman, Barbara M. (1989-11-15). Kit's Kingdom: The Journalism of Kathleen Blake Coleman. McGill-Queen's Press - MQUP. ISBN 978-0-7735-7360-4.
