= Elizabeth Matheson =

Elizabeth Matheson may refer to:

- Elizabeth Matheson (photographer)
- Elizabeth Matheson (potter)
- Elizabeth Scott Matheson (1866–1958), Canadian physician
