= Galvanic bath =

Alternative medical treatment

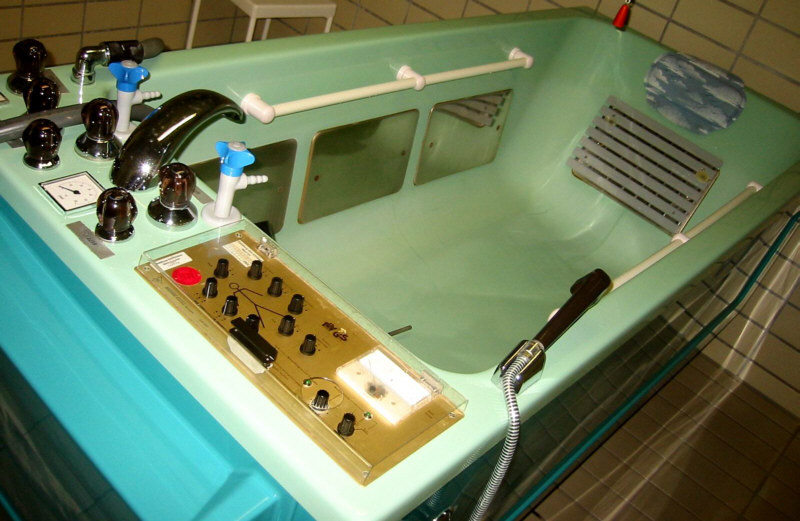
Galvanic bath

Galvanic bath is an alternative medical treatment (a type of electrotherapy) based on the simultaneous use of water and electric current. The patient lies in a 34 degree Celsius bath, while gentle electric current is passed through their body.

Galvanic baths are mostly used in the treatment of degenerative diseases such as inflammatory arthritis and problems with the joints. The treatment lasts about 15 minutes.

== Types ==
In addition to full galvanic baths, when the patient's body is fully immersed in water, there are also four-chambered galvanic baths (also called four cell galvanic baths), which also combine electrical energy and hydrotherapy, but are used only on the limbs. Patient's forearms and lower legs are put in water trays, and electric current is passed through warm water. This procedure is said to improve the circulation, reduce pain and was considered especially beneficial for rheumatoid arthritis though no studies have been done to confirm these claims.

== History ==
Jennie Kidd Trout played the most notable role in studying galvanic bath effects and generally popularizing the procedure.

The Therapeutic and Electrical Institute opened by Jennie Kidd Trout in Toronto, Ontario, Canada, specialized in specific treatments for all that involved Austyn galvanic baths and electricity. She also ran a free dispensary for the poor located at the same place, for six years. The Therapeutic and Electrical Institute included six houses. Eventually the institute was able to open two more branches in Hamilton and Brantford, Ontario.

== Physiological benefits ==
There appear to be no contemporary scientific studies regarding the physiological effects of galvanic baths, beneficial or otherwise.

== See also ==
- Frequency Specific Microcurrent
- Galvanic treatment (Cosmetic)
