= Dominion Women's Enfranchisement Association =

- Formation: 1889
- Type: Non-profit association
- Purpose: Obtain the vote for women
- Headquarters: Toronto
- Region served: Canada

The Dominion Women's Enfranchisement Association (DWEA) was an organization founded by Dr. Emily Howard Stowe in 1889 to fight for the right of women to vote. She was succeeded by her daughter Dr. Augusta Stowe-Gullen as President of the Dominion Women's Enfranchisement Association in 1903. Later the association was renamed the Canadian Suffrage Association in 1906.

== Background ==
Dr. Emily Howard Stowe (1831–1903) was the first Canadian woman to practice medicine in Canada. She was not allowed to study medicine in Canada, so she moved to the United States and obtained a degree in homeopathic medicine from the New York Medical College for Women in 1867 and that year opened her homeopathy practice in Toronto. It was not until 1880 that she was granted a licence to practice medicine. In 1877 Stowe was one of the founders of the Toronto Women's Literary Guild, which managed to obtain access to some higher education for women and improve women's working conditions. The Guild was renamed the Canadian Women's Suffrage Association in 1883, with Jessie (McEwen) Turnbull as its first president.

== Foundation ==
In 1888 Stowe attended an international suffragette conference in Washington, D.C., United States. Fired with determination to bring new life to the movement, she founded the Dominion Women's Enfranchisement Association (DWEA) in 1889. The DWEA was among a number of Women's organizations founded around this time and run by exceptionally capable women, others being the Women's Art Association of Canada, National Council of Women of Canada, Imperial Order Daughters of the Empire (IODE), the Young Women's Christian Association (YWCA), Girls' Friendly Society of Canada, Women's Institutes and Woman's Christian Temperance Union (WCTU).

== History ==
Stowe was the first president of the DWEA. She held office from 1889 until her death in 1903. Within a year of its foundation branches began to appear in different towns of Ontario. On 12–13 June 1890 the DWEA held a convention in Toronto attended by more than 100 women. Speakers included Dr. Emily Stowe and the Reverend Anna Howard Shaw, M.D. of the United States. Kathleen Blake Coleman of the Mail invited comment from her readers. She quoted one from "Pollie" at length,

Giving women the ballot would not fail to have a beneficial effect on the future of Canada. If woman's indirect influence has in most cases been on the side of good, how much more her direct influence will be felt when she had a voice in making the laws of her country. She will then see to it that we have laws to amend the purity and happiness of her home ... Canadian future statesmen,—by having less temptation to contend with, would become more intelligent, for believe me, Kit, one half the men—politically speaking—are densely ignorant.

In 1890 the DWEA sponsored a suffrage bill, but without success. At this stage the suffragettes were simply claiming the right to vote since they paid taxes and could bring new ideas to politics. Otherwise, they were not asking for full equality of the sexes. Most believed that the woman's place was in the home, but did not think this was incompatible with voting. In 1893 the DWEA was one of the first national organizations to federate with the National Council of Women of Canada. Emily Stowe and Emily Willoughby Cummings of the Anglican Women's Auxiliary were two of the organizers of the founding meeting of the National Council, held in the Horticultural Pavilion in Toronto on 27 October 1893. About 1,500 women attended, and some men.

Stowe and her daughter Augusta Stowe-Gullen (1857–1943), the first woman to graduate from a Canadian medical school, organized a much publicized "mock parliament". The debate was staged in 1896. The women participants debated whether men should be given the vote. Using the same arguments that men had used against votes for women, they voted against the proposal. Despite their efforts, the DWEA was not successful in advancing the cause of women's suffrage in Canada at either the Federal or Provincial levels. No bills were introduced between 1893 and 1910 for women's votes, and the conservative National Council of Women of Canada would not give support until 1910.

The Canadian Suffrage Association was founded in 1906. Augusta Stowe-Gullen became president of this successor organization. She later became vice-president of the National Council of Women.
