= Augusta Stowe-Gullen =

Canadian doctor and lecturer (1857-1943)

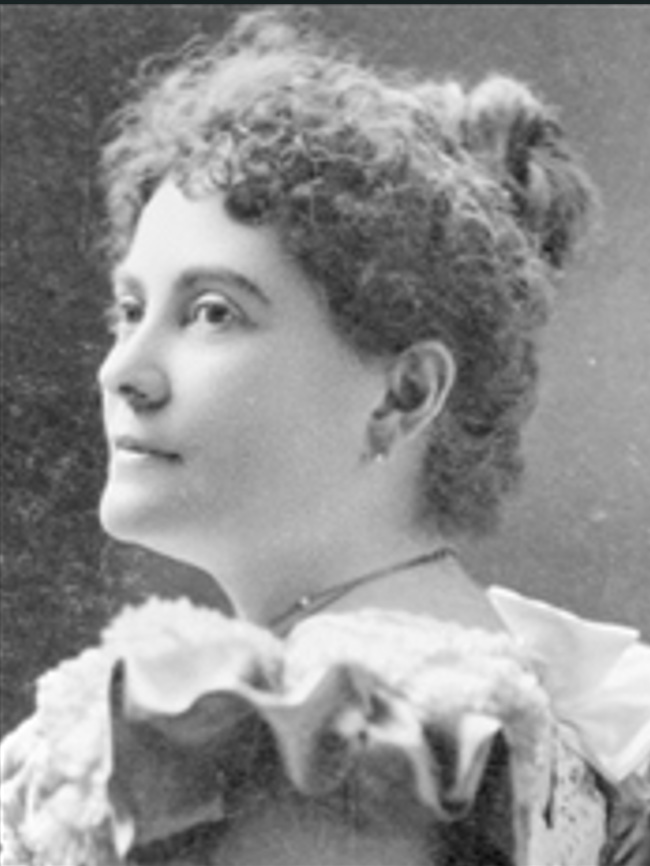
- Augusta Stowe-Gullen (1857–1943), Canadian physician and suffragist
- Born: Ann Augusta Stowe; July 27, 1857; Mount Pleasant, Brant County, Canada West
- Died: September 25, 1943 (aged 86); Toronto, Ontario, Canada
- Education: Victoria College, Cobourg (MD, 1883)
- Occupations: Physician, lecturer, suffragist
- Years active: c. 1883–1930s
- Known for: First woman to graduate from a Canadian medical school
- Relatives: Emily Howard Stowe (mother)
- Medical career
- Field: Medicine
- Institutions: Ontario Medical College for Women; Women's College Hospital (founding movement)
- Awards: King George V Silver Jubilee Medal (1935)

Ann Augusta Stowe-Gullen (July 27, 1857 – September 25, 1943) was a Canadian physician, educator, and women's rights activist. In 1883, she became the first woman to earn a medical degree from a Canadian medical school, graduating from Victoria College in Cobourg, Ontario. Her achievement marked an important milestone in the struggle for women's access to professional medical education in Canada.

Stowe-Gullen built a long career in medicine and public life at a time when women physicians were still rare. She taught at the Ontario Medical College for Women, helped advance the movement that led to the creation of Women's College Hospital in Toronto, and was active in national organizations advocating women's rights and social reform.

Closely associated with the early Canadian suffrage movement, she succeeded her mother, physician and reformer Emily Howard Stowe, as president of the Dominion Women's Enfranchisement Association in 1903. Through her medical work, public advocacy, and leadership in women's organizations, Stowe-Gullen played an important role in expanding professional and political opportunities for women in Canada. In 1935, she was appointed as an officer of the Order of the British Empire.

== Early life ==
Augusta Stowe-Gullen was born Ann Augusta Stowe on July 27, 1857, in Mount Pleasant, Brant County, Canada West (now Ontario). She was the eldest of three children of the physician and women's rights activist Emily Howard Stowe and her husband, John Fiuscia Michael Heward Stowe; the couple also had two sons.

Stowe spent her early childhood in southwestern Ontario before the family moved to Toronto during the 1860s. There she grew up in a household closely connected to debates about women's education, professional training, and social reform.

Her mother, Emily Stowe, was among the first women physicians to practise medicine in Canada and an advocate for women's access to universities and professional careers. Through her family's activities, Stowe was exposed from an early age to the emerging movement for women in medicine and to reform networks supporting women's education and political rights.

The Stowe family home in Toronto frequently served as a gathering place for reformers and activists campaigning to expand educational and professional opportunities for women. These discussions were closely connected to the activities of the Toronto Women's Literary Club, founded by Emily Stowe in 1876 and later known as the Canadian Women's Suffrage Association.

== Medical career ==
Stowe-Gullen entered the medical profession in 1883 at the age of 26 when she graduated from Victoria College in Cobourg with a Doctor of Medicine degree. Her graduation marked a major milestone in Canadian medical history: she became the first woman to receive a medical degree from a Canadian medical school. Her achievement also created the first mother–daughter medical team in Canada, as her mother, physician Emily Stowe, had previously trained in the United States after being denied admission to Canadian medical schools.

Soon after graduating, Stowe-Gullen established a medical practice in Toronto. Like many early women physicians, she devoted much of her work to the care of women and children, fields in which female physicians were often more readily accepted by patients.

Her graduation coincided with growing pressure to create formal medical training opportunities for women in Canada. At the time, most medical schools continued to exclude female students. Stowe-Gullen herself became involved in efforts to establish a medical college for women. Her appeals to Toronto physician Dr. William T. Barrett and other members of the medical profession helped bring about the creation of the Ontario Medical College for Women in the early 1880s.

Following the establishment of the college, Stowe-Gullen joined the faculty and began teaching medical subjects to female students. In her late twenties she was already helping train the next generation of women physicians. Over the following decade her academic responsibilities expanded as the college grew and the number of women entering medical training gradually increased.

In 1892, when she was about 35 years old, Stowe-Gullen was appointed professor of obstetrics at the Ontario Medical College for Women. Obstetrics was one of the most important clinical fields available to women physicians during the late nineteenth century, both because of patient demand and because hospital appointments for women remained limited in many other specialties.

Alongside her teaching, Stowe-Gullen maintained an active medical practice and supported the development of clinical institutions that would allow women physicians to gain hospital experience. She became associated with Women's College Hospital in Toronto, an institution closely connected to the medical college that provided both patient care and clinical training for women medical students at a time when many hospitals did not permit women physicians to hold staff appointments.

By the early twentieth century Stowe-Gullen had become one of the senior figures in Canadian women's medical education. In 1910, at the age of 52, she was appointed dean of the Ontario Medical College for Women. In the same year she was appointed to the University of Toronto Senate, becoming one of the first women to hold such a position at the university.

Her professional career extended beyond medicine into wider public life. She was a founding member of the National Council of Women of Canada and remained active in women's reform movements throughout her life. In recognition of her long public service and contributions to Canadian society, she was awarded the King George V Silver Jubilee Medal in 1935.

Reflecting later on the struggle that had allowed women to enter the medical profession in Canada, Stowe-Gullen described the barriers that had once faced women seeking medical education. In her 1906 history of the Ontario Medical College for Women, she wrote that women who wished to study medicine had been left with almost no opportunities in the country, noting that "women who desired to study medicine found themselves practically without opportunity in Canada."

She argued that the success of the women's medical college had demonstrated the viability of women's medical education. As she concluded in the same account, "the success which has attended the efforts of the founders of the Ontario Medical College for Women has fully justified the experiment of providing medical education for women."

== Activism ==
She was elected a trustee on the Toronto Board of Education in 1892, serving until 1896. Toronto allowed women to run for the Board of Education long before Ontario allowed this elsewhere.

Stowe-Gullen also helped her mother establish what would later be called Women's College Hospital.

A leading figure in the suffrage movement, she succeeded her mother as president of the Dominion Women's Enfranchisement Association in 1903.

She is known for her quotation "When women have a voice in national and international affairs, wars will cease forever."

== Death ==
She died at her home in Toronto on September 25, 1943.

== In popular culture ==
In "Jagged Little Pill" (November 7, 2016), episode 5 of season 10 of the Canadian television period detective series Murdoch Mysteries, Stowe-Gullen is shown supervising the operation of the Ontario Medical College for Women. Stowe-Gullen is played by Julie Khaner.
