= Elizabeth Scott Matheson =

- Born: Elizabeth Beckett Scott; 6 January 1866 near Cambellford, Canada West
- Died: 15 January 1958 (aged 92); San Antonio, Texas
- Occupations: teacher, physician
- Years active: 1888–1941

Elizabeth Scott Matheson (6 January 1866 – 15 January 1958) was a Canadian physician, who completed her medical studies in 1898, and though recognized by government as the district doctor, the Northwest Territories College of Physicians and Surgeons refused to issue her a license. She returned to school and was again refused a license until 1904 when it was finally granted. Having served from 1892 to 1918 at the Onion Lake mission in Saskatchewan, Matheson became the assistant medical officer for the public school system of Winnipeg from 1918 until her retirement in 1941.

== Early life ==
Elizabeth Beckett Scott was born near Cambellford, Canada West on 6 January 1866 to Elizabeth (née Beckett) and James Scott, who had immigrated from Scotland to Canada. She began her education at the age of four, attending school in Burnbrae. In 1878, the family moved to Morris, Manitoba, where Scott completed her primary education. She went on to secondary school, attending high school and normal school training in Winnipeg.

== Career ==
Upon finishing her studies, Scott began teaching in Winnipeg, but soon her brother Tom convinced her to return to Ontario and found her a position in the Sunnyside School District. In 1885, she met John Matheson, whom she would later marry, but at the time, he was thirty-seven and she was only nineteen, and Scott had reservations about their age difference and his boisterous life. In 1887, she volunteered to work at an orphanage and while there, attended the Women's Medical College in Kingston for a year. In 1888, she took a position to teach for seven years in Bombay with the Presbyterian Mission School. Contracting malaria, she returned to Manitoba. In 1891, she married Matheson, who had converted to Christianity and determined to enter missionary work. The following year, the couple were posted at the Anglican mission at Onion Lake, Saskatchewan.

The Mathesons established a school to teach the children of the area, as well as their own growing family. As the school was not well attended if students were left to make their own way there, the couple boarded them in their own home. By the end of their first year, they had about eighty students living with them. The need for a doctor for their growing household, convinced Matheson to return to medical school and in 1895, she enrolled at the Manitoba Medical College. During her year there, gave birth to her third child. At the end of the school term, she transferred to the Trinity Medical College for Women where she completed her education and successfully passed her examinations in 1898. She returned to the mission at Onion Lake and served as the area doctor, though the Northwest Territories College of Physicians and Surgeons refused to issue her a license. Her husband built her a three-storey hospital with a surgical room. In 1901, despite her lack of license, Matheson's care during the smallpox epidemic, led the government to recognize her as the district doctor and give her a contract for $300 per year.

As other physicians began to move into the area, Matheson's unlicensed status prompted her to apply again for approval, but she was rejected. Fearing that she might not be able to pass a licensing examination, in 1903, she returned to the Manitoba Medical College. She completed an additional year's schooling, graduating with a second medical degree in 1904. Still the College of Physicians and Surgeons for the Northwest Territories in Alberta refused her a license until her husband intervened. Near the end of his life, John became ill and Matheson took over his duties as principal at the school, as well as continuing her own medical practice. He died in 1916 and she would remain at Onion Lake until 1918. She relocated to Winnipeg in that year and took an appointment as the assistant medical inspector to the public schools. She would remain in this post until her retirement in 1941.

== Death and legacy ==
Matheson died on 15 January 1958 at the home of one of her nine children, Gladys, in San Antonio, Texas. In 1974, her biography The Doctor Rode Side-Saddle was published by her daughter, Ruth Matheson Buck.
