= College of Physicians and Surgeons of Saskatchewan =

Canadian regulatory college

The College of Physicians and Surgeons of Saskatchewan is a regulatory college which acts as the governing body in the province of Saskatchewan that manages the licensing of medical practitioners, verifies practice standards for medicine, and follow up on and possibly disciplines physicians in which medical or ethical conduct are at issue.
