= Emily Stowe =

Canadian physician

Emily Howard Stowe
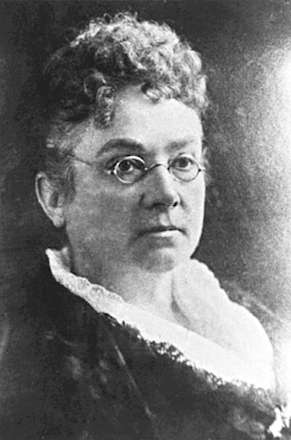
- Emily Howard Stowe
- Born: Emily Howard Jennings; May 1, 1831; Norwich Township, Oxford County, Ontario, Canada West
- Died: April 30, 1903 (aged 71); Toronto, Ontario, Canada
- Education: New York Medical College for Women
- Occupations: Physician; Suffragist
- Known for: First female physician to practise in Canada; founder of the Canadian Women's Suffrage Association
- Spouse: John Fiuscia Michael Heward Stowe
- Children: 3, including Augusta Stowe-Gullen
- Medical career
- Field: Women's health
- Institutions: Private medical practice in Toronto

Emily Howard Stowe (née Jennings; May 1, 1831 – April 30, 1903) was a Canadian physician who was the first female physician to practise in Canada, the second licensed female physician in Canada and an activist for women's rights and suffrage. Stowe helped found the women's suffrage movement in Canada and campaigned for the country's first medical college for women.

== Early life ==
Emily Howard Jennings was born in Norwich Township, Oxford County, Ontario, as one of six daughters of farmers Hannah Howard and Solomon Jennings.

=== Education ===
Stowe was raised in a household that valued education for girls. Her father, Solomon Jennings, converted to Methodism, but her mother, Hannah Howard Jennings, had been educated at a Quaker seminary in the United States and raised Stowe and her five sisters according to Quaker principles. Quaker communities encouraged women to read, learn, and participate in public life. Hannah Jennings educated her daughters at home and also taught them practical skills, including the use of herbal remedies and other forms of household healing.

Stowe began teaching while still young and spent several years working in local schools. Seeking formal training as a teacher, she applied in 1852 to Victoria College in Cobourg, Canada West, but the college did not admit women and her application was refused. Stowe instead applied to the Normal School for Upper Canada in Toronto, founded by Egerton Ryerson to train teachers for the province's public school system. She entered the program in November 1853, aged 22, and graduated the following year with first-class honours.

During the 1860s, Stowe turned her attention to medicine. Influenced in part by her familiarity with herbal healing and by personal circumstances, including the declining health of her husband, she sought formal medical training. In 1865, at the age of 34, Stowe applied to the Toronto School of Medicine but was refused admission because she was a woman. The vice-principal reportedly told her that "the doors of the University are not open to women and I trust they never will be." Stowe later recalled replying that she would make it "the business of my life" to see those doors opened so that women would have the same opportunities as men.

Unable to study medicine in Canada, Stowe travelled to the United States and enrolled at the New York Medical College for Women, a homeopathic medical school that admitted female students at a time when most medical schools in North America remained closed to them. She completed her studies there and graduated in 1867, aged 36.

=== Early career ===
After completing her teacher training, Stowe continued teaching and gained a reputation as a capable educator. She later became principal of a public school in Brantford, making her one of the first women in Canada West to hold such a position.

=== Marriage and family ===
She married John Fiuscia Michael Heward Stowe in 1856. In the next seven years she had three children: two sons and a daughter. Shortly after the birth of their third child, her husband developed tuberculosis, which led her to take a renewed interest in medicine. Having had experience with herbal remedies and homeopathic medicine since the 1840s, Emily Stowe left teaching and decided to become a doctor.

== Medical career ==
In 1867, Stowe returned to Canada and opened a medical practice in Toronto, on Richmond Street, that specialized in treating women and children. Stowe gained some local prominence through public lectures on women's health and maintained a steady clientele through newspaper advertisements.

In 1879, one of Stowe's patients, a nineteen-year-old named Sarah Lovell, died, and Stowe was charged with providing an abortion to her patient. Stowe testified that she had prescribed Lovell a one thirtieth of the full dose of drug that could cause a miscarriage, an amount too small to cause a miscarriage. Many members and male leaders of the Toronto medical community came to her defence. Though the coroner's jury ruled that Lovell had poisoned herself, Stowe was charged with performing a medical abortion. Stowe was acquitted after a short trial during which she gained public support.

The College of Physicians and Surgeons of Ontario granted Stowe a licence to practise medicine on July 16, 1880, based on her experience since 1850, Dr. Aikins' willingness to testify for her, and her earlier apprenticeship to Dr. Joseph J. Lancaster. This licence made Stowe the second female licensed physician in Canada, after Trout.

On June 13, 1883, Stowe led a group of supporters to a meeting at the Toronto Women's Suffrage Club where the group tabled a resolution stating "that medical education for women is a recognized necessity, and consequently facilities for such instruction should be provided."

Her daughter, Augusta Stowe-Gullen, was the first woman to earn a medical degree in Canada.

== Women's rights ==
While studying medicine in New York, Stowe met with Susan B. Anthony and witnessed the divisions within the American women's suffrage movement. Stowe also attended a women's club meeting in Cleveland, Ohio. Stowe adopted a gradualist strategy which she brought back to her work in Canada.

In 1876, Stowe founded the Toronto Women's Literary Club, renamed the Canadian Women's Suffrage Association in 1883. This has led some to consider Stowe the mother of the suffrage movement in Canada. The Literary Club campaigned for improved working conditions for women and pressured schools in Toronto to accept women into higher education. In 1883, a public meeting of the Suffrage Association led to the formation of the Ontario Medical College for Women, the country's first women's medical school. When the Dominion Women's Enfranchisement Association was founded in 1889, Stowe became its first president and remained president until her death.

As is true for many suffragists, a tension existed between Stowe's commitment to fellow women and class loyalty. In an episode that may demonstrate the dominance of the latter, Stowe broke the bond of doctor-patient confidentiality by disclosing the abortion request of a patient, Sara Ann Lovell, a domestic servant, to her employer. (See Abortion trial of Emily Stowe.) Stowe, however, sharply criticized the National Policy economic program in 1892. She believed that it would not help working-class Canadians and was instead a corrupt deal on behalf of major businesses.

After breaking her hip at the Columbian Exposition's Women's Congress in 1893, Stowe retired from medicine. In 1896, Emily and her daughter Augusta participated in an all-female "mock parliament," in which the women considered a petition from a male delegation for the right to vote. Stowe, as the Attorney General, used the same arguments that the Canadian Parliament had levelled against female suffragists and denied the petition. Stowe died in 1903, fourteen years before Canadian women were granted the right to vote.

== Personal life ==
While she counted herself a Quaker until 1879, she became a Unitarian in 1879 and attended the First Unitarian Congregation of Toronto.

== Legacy ==
=== Influence on women's rights and education ===
- Stowe is widely regarded as a pioneer who helped open the medical profession to women in Canada and played an important role in the early movement for women's rights.
- In 1876 she helped found the Toronto Women's Literary Club, one of the first organizations in Canada devoted to advancing women's rights. The organization later developed into the Canadian Women's Suffrage Association.
- Through her public advocacy and medical career, Stowe challenged the exclusion of women from universities and professional training, helping create opportunities for women to study and practise medicine in Canada.
- Her influence extended to the next generation of women physicians. Her daughter, Augusta Stowe-Gullen, later became the first woman to earn a medical degree in Canada.

=== Commemoration and honours ===
- In 1995, Stowe was designated a National Historic Person by the Historic Sites and Monuments Board of Canada.
- In 2018 she was inducted into the Canadian Medical Hall of Fame for her pioneering role in opening the medical profession to women in Canada.

=== Places and institutions named in her honour ===
- Several places in Ontario are named after Stowe, including Emily Stowe Public School in Norwich Township, Ontario and Dr. Emily Stowe Public School in Courtice, Ontario.
- In 2013, Toronto City Council renamed a portion of Elizabeth Street near Women's College Hospital as Dr. Emily Stowe Way.
- Community organizations have also adopted her name, including the Emily Stowe Shelter for Women in Toronto, which provides services and support to women and families experiencing crisis.

== See also ==
- Jennie Smillie Robertson
- Jessie Gray
