= Canadian Women's Suffrage Association =

Canadian women's rights organization

- Formation: 1877
- Type: Women's Association
- Legal status: historic
- Purpose: advocate and public voice, educator and network, women's suffrage in Canada
- Headquarters: Toronto, Ontario
- Region served: Canada
- Official language: English; French

The Canadian Women's Suffrage Association, originally called the Toronto Women's Literary Guild, was an organization based in Toronto, Ontario, Canada, that fought for women's rights.

After the association had been inactive for a while, the leaders founded the Dominion Women's Enfranchisement Association in 1889.

== History ==
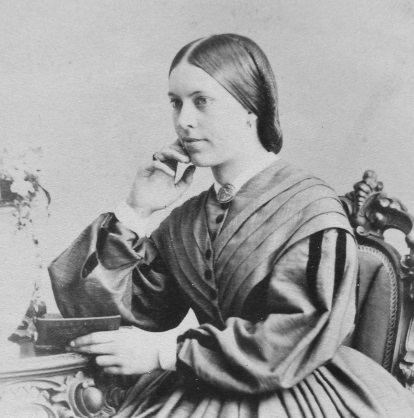
First President in 1883

The Toronto Women's Literary Guild was established in 1877 to fight for women's rights and for improved working conditions. Jessie Turnbull and Dr. Emily Howard Stowe, Canada's second licensed female physician, were founders.

The guild had some success in improving access to higher education for women. It was renamed the Canadian Women's Suffrage Association in 1883 with Turnbull as its first president.

The Toronto-based association worked towards opening up education to women, and allowing women to advance as professionals, particularly as doctors.

After the association had been inactive for a while, the leaders founded the Dominion Women's Enfranchisement Association in 1889.

== See also ==
- List of suffragists and suffragettes
- List of women's rights activists
- Timeline of women's suffrage
- Women's suffrage organizations
- Feminism in Canada
