= List of consuls-general of the United Kingdom in New York =

The British consul general in New York is head of the British Consulate General in New York, United States, which provide services to British nationals living in and visiting New York, New Jersey, Pennsylvania, and Fairfield County in Connecticut.

The office predates 1857 and played a critical role when the capital of the United States was New York. One of the earliest consuls-general was Thomas Henry Barclay, a native New Yorker who was a Loyalist during the American Revolution who later served the Crown as a resident of Nova Scotia. He served as Consul-General in New York from 1799 (to 1822), replacing Sir John Temple, the first Consul-General and also native born to North America.

The consulate is located in an office block at 845 Third Avenue, New York.

On 15 March 2019 the British Government acquired a penthouse in 50 United Nations Plaza, for their trade commissioner for North America and consul general in New York, Antony Phillipson, for $16m.

== Consuls-general of the United Kingdom in New York ==
- 1857–1883: Sir Edward Archibald Consul from 1857 Consul-General from 1871
- 1883–1894: Sir William Booker
- 1894–1907: Sir Percy Sanderson
- 1907–1915: Sir Courtenay Bennett
- 1915–1919: Charles Bayley
- 1919: Wilfred Thesiger appointed but did not proceed
- 1920–1931: Sir Gloster Armstrong
- 1931–1938: Sir Gerald Campbell
- 1938–1944: Sir Godfrey Haggard
- 1944–1950: Sir Francis Evans
- 1951–1953: Sir Henry Hobson
- 1953–1957: Sir Francis Rundall
- 1957–1960: Sir Hugh Stephenson
- 1960–1964: Sir Alan Williams
- 1964–1966: Sir Stanley Tomlinson
- 1966–1971: Sir Anthony Rouse
- 1971–1975: John Ford
- 1975–1980: Sir Gordon Booth
- 1980–1983: Sir Hugh Overton
- 1983–1986: Sir Francis Kennedy
- 1986–1988: Sir James Mellon
- 1989–1991: Sir Gordon Jewkes
- 1991–1996: Sir Alistair Hunter
- 1996–1999: Jeffrey Ling
- 1999–2004: Sir Thomas Harris
- 2004–2007: Sir Philip Thomas
- 2007–2011: Sir Alan Collins
- 2011–2016: Danny Lopez
- 2016–2017: Antonia Romeo
- 2017–2021: Antony Phillipson
- 2021–2024: Emma Wade-Smith
- 2024: Hannah Young
- 2025–2026: Oliver Christian
- 2026-present: Alex Milward
