= Percy Sanderson =

British diplomat (1842–1919)

Sir Percy Sanderson KCMG
- Portrait by Walter Stoneman, 1917

British Consul-General in New York
- In office 1894–1907
- Preceded by: Sir William Booker
- Succeeded by: Sir Courtenay Bennett

Personal details
- Born: 7 July 1842 London
- Died: 11 July 1919 (aged 77)

Military service
- Allegiance: United Kingdom; East India Company
- Branch/service: British Army; Madras Army
- Years of service: 1859–1870
- Unit: Royal Madras Artillery; Royal Horse Artillery

Sir Percy Sanderson (7 July 1842 – 11 July 1919) was a British diplomat who served as consul-general in New York from 1894 to 1907.

== Early life and education ==
Sanderson was born in London on 7 July 1842, the son of Richard Sanderson and Charlotte Matilda, daughter of the first Viscount Canterbury. He was educated at Eton College and Addiscombe Military Seminary.

== Career ==
Sanderson received a commission into the Royal Madras Artillery in 1859, and in 1864 was appointed to the Royal Horse Artillery. From 1865 to 1866 he was aide-de-camp to Sir William Denison, Governor of Madras. In 1868 he was acting aide-de-camp to Lord Napier, Governor of Madras, while also acting Commissary of Ordnance, first class, at Fort St. George. He retired from the Army in 1870.

Sanderson joined the Foreign Office, and was appointed consul at Galatz, Romania in 1876. In 1882, he was promoted to consul-general, and also acted as chargé d'affaires at Bucharest on several occasions between 1881 and 1886. He also served as HM Commissioner for the Navigation of the Danube carrying out arrangements for navigation on the river, and attended the Danube Conference in London in 1888.

In 1894, he was appointed consul-general for the states of New York, Delaware, New Jersey, Rhode Island, and Connecticut, resident at New York, a post he held until his retirement in 1907.

He then returned to England, and settled in Oxfordshire where he became a JP. He died on 11 July 1919, aged 77.

== Honours ==
Sanderson was appointed Companion of the Order of St Michael and St George (CMG) in the 1886 Birthday Honours, and promoted to Knight Commander (KCMG) in the 1899 Birthday Honours.

Diplomatic posts
Preceded by Sir William Booker	British Consul-General in New York; 1894–1907	Succeeded by Sir Courtenay Bennett
