= Women's suffrage in Canada =

Canadian movement for women's voting rights

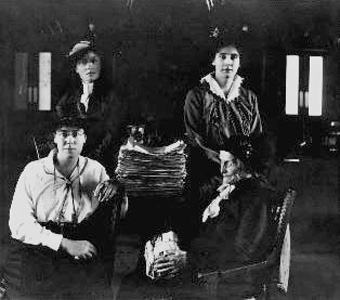
Presentation of petition by Political Equality League for enfranchisement of women, Winnipeg, 23 December 1915

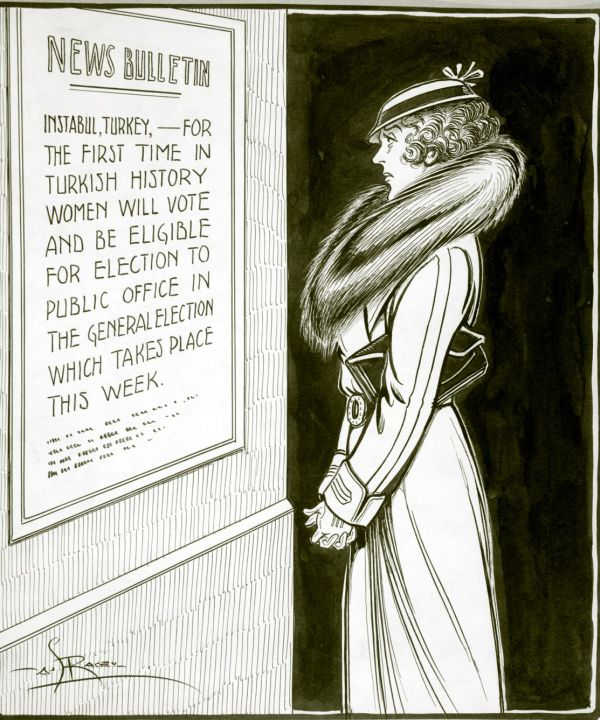
Political cartoon commenting on women's voting rights in Quebec, 1930

Women's suffrage in Canada occurred at different times in different jurisdictions to different demographics of women. Women's right to vote began in the three prairie provinces. In 1916, suffrage was earned by white women in Manitoba, Saskatchewan, and Alberta. The federal government granted war-time suffrage to some white women in 1917 and followed with full suffrage in 1918, at least, granting it on same basis as men, that is, certain races and status were excluded from voting in federal elections prior to 1960. When Canada granted federal voting rights to women on May 24, 1918, the law applied primarily to white women (and some Black women) who were Canadian citizens aged 21 and older, while excluding Indigenous, Asian, and other minority women, " who were finally enfranchised in 1948 and 1960, respectively."

By the close of 1922, all the Canadian provinces, except Quebec, had granted full suffrage to White and Black women, yet Asian and Indigenous women still could not vote. In Newfoundland, at that time a separate dominion, women earned suffrage in 1925 for women not Asian and not Indigenous. Women in Quebec, who were not Asian and not Indigenous, gained suffrage in 1940.

Municipal suffrage was earned in 1884 to property-owning widows and spinsters in the provinces of Quebec and Ontario; in 1886, in the province of New Brunswick, to all property-owning women except those whose husbands were voters; in Nova Scotia, in 1886; and in Prince Edward Island, in 1888, to property-owning widows and spinsters.

Asian women (and men) were not granted suffrage until after World War II in 1948, Inuit women (and men) were not granted suffrage until 1950, and it was not until 1960 that suffrage (in Federal elections) was extended to First Nations women (and men) without requiring them to give up their treaty status. Incarcerated women (and men) serving sentences fewer than two years in length were granted suffrage in 1993, and incarcerated women (and men) serving longer sentences were given the vote in 2002.

== Early history (1870s–1880s) ==
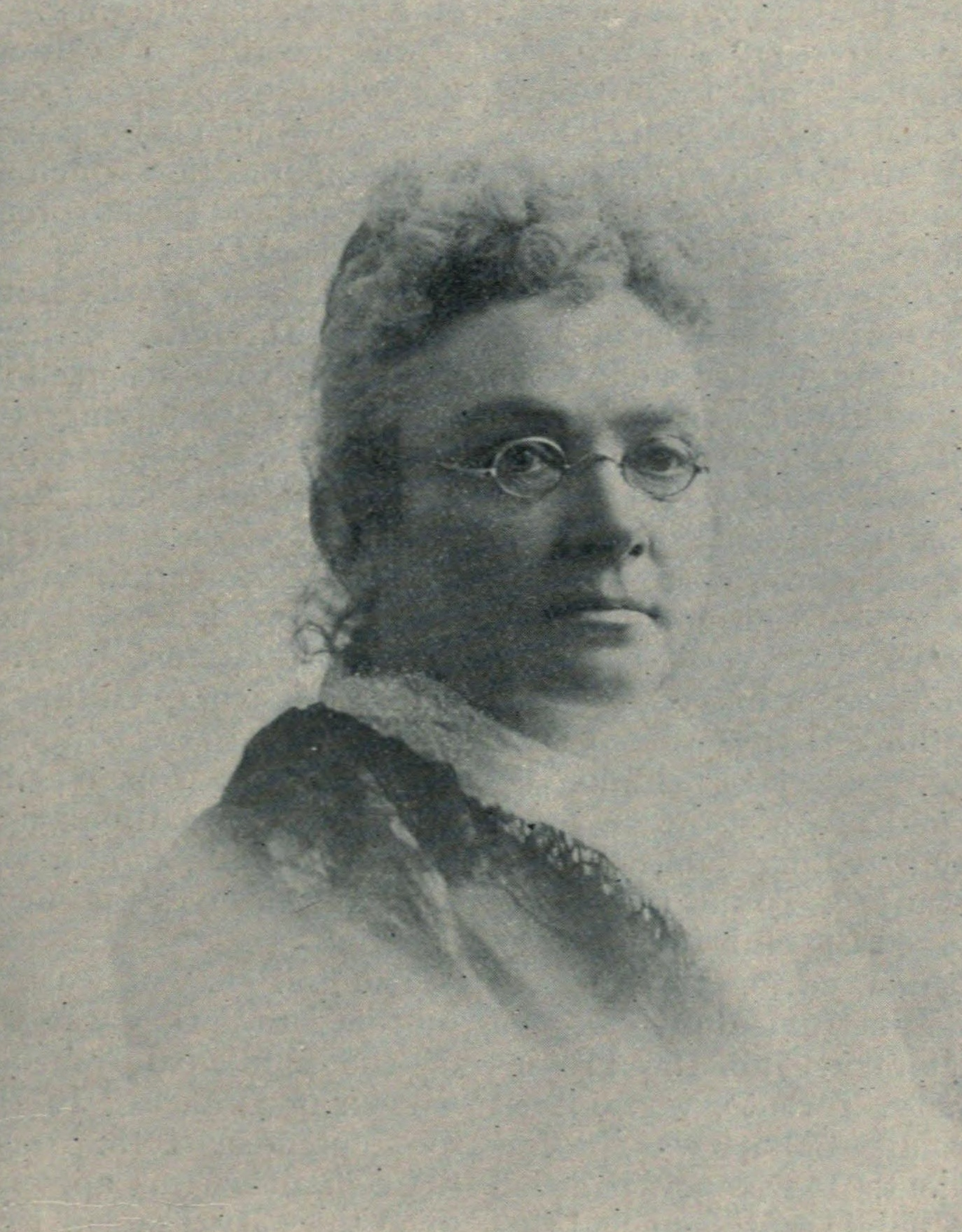
Emily Stowe

The cause of women's suffrage began in 1876, when Dr. Emily Stowe came to Toronto to practise medicine. She was the first, and for many years the sole, woman physician in Canada. Stowe, vitally interested in all matters relating to women, at once came before the public as a lecturer upon topics then somewhat new, "Woman's Sphere" and "Women in the Professions", being her subjects. She lectured not only in Toronto, but, under the auspices of various Mechanics' Institutes, in Ottawa, Whitby, and Bradford.

At the beginning many suffragists were Black women. These women advocated for suffrage for the sole purpose of boosting their social status in order to help create a better society. Black male and female abolitionists, unionists, socialists, and temperance activists supported them.

=== Toronto Woman's Literary Club and Ontario Municipal Act ===
After attending a meeting of the American Society for the Advancement of Women in Cleveland in 1877, and meeting many women of the United States, Stowe, on returning home, felt that the time had arrived for some similar union among Canadian women. She and her friend Helen Archibald decided that it would not be politic to attempt at once a suffrage association. Instead, in November 1877, they organized the Toronto Woman's Literary Club (TWLC).

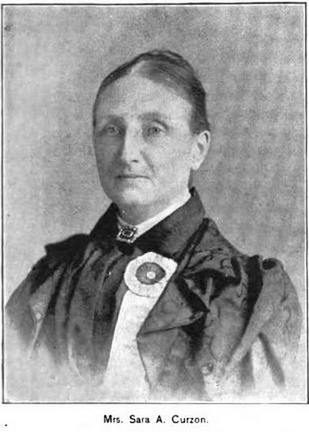
Sarah Ann Curzon (1897)

During the next five years, this club grew phenomenally, with the addition of Mary McDonell (WCTU), Mrs. W. B. Hamilton, Mrs. W. I. Mackenzie, Mrs. J. Austin Shaw, and others. It also elicited much attention from the press. Among its most capable assistants from its very inception was Sarah Anne Curzon, for several years associate editor of the Canada Citizen.

It was the habit of the club to meet each Thursday at 3 p.m., at one of the members' homes. Though not avowedly a suffrage society, no opportunity was lost of promoting this basic idea of the founders. One of the earliest efforts in this direction was a paper, by Archibald, entitled "Woman Under the Civil Law", which elicited discussion and served as educational material. Moreover, during these years, mainly through the work of the TWLC, the University of Toronto was opened to women, with Eliza Balmer as the first female student.

In 1882, the Ontario Municipal Act was amended to give married women, widows and spinsters, if possessed of the necessary qualifications, the right to vote on by-laws and some other minor municipal matters. Again, in 1884, the Act was further amended, extending the right to vote in municipal elections on all matters to widows and unmarried women. In the municipal elections in Toronto held on January 4, 1886, women's votes were extremely important and resulted in the election of a candidate pledged to reform, William Holmes Howland.

=== Canadian Women's Suffrage Association ===
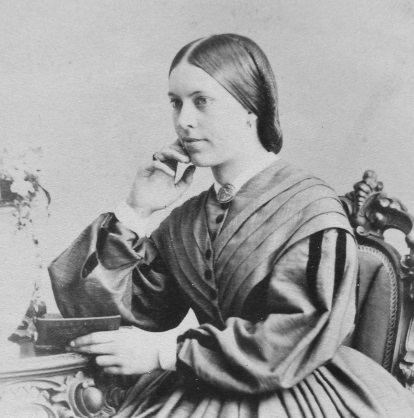
Jessie Turnbull - President

In 1883, the TWLC became the Toronto Women's Suffrage Association.

It was believed in 1883 that public sentiment had sufficiently progressed to warrant the formation of a regular Woman-Suffrage Society. On February 1, 1883, the club met and decided the following:

... that in view of the ultimate end for which the Toronto Woman's Literary Club was formed, having been attained, viz., to foster a general and living public sentiment in favour of women suffrage, this Club hereby disband, to form a Canadian Women's Suffrage Association.

The following month, on March 5, at a meeting of the City Council, the Toronto Women's Literary and Social Progress Club requested the use of the Council Chambers on March 9. Their purpose was to hold a conversation to discuss the advisability of granting the franchise to those women who possessed the property qualification that entitled men to hold it; and then to proceed to form a suffrage club. Accordingly, on that date, Jessie Turnbull McEwen, then-President of the club, was present along with Mayor Arthur Radcliffe Boswell, ex-Alderman John Hallam, Alderman John Baxter, John Wilson Bengough, Thomas Bengough, Thomas Phillips Thompson, and Mr. Burgess, editor of Citizen. The Canadian Woman Suffrage Association was formally inaugurated, and 40 people enrolled themselves as members that evening.

The first piece of work undertaken by the Association was the securing of the municipal franchise for the women of Ontario. On September 10, 1883, a committee was appointed to urge the City Council to petition the Local Government to pass a bill conferring the municipal franchise upon women. The committee consisted of Stowe, McEwen, Mrs. Hamilton, Mrs. Miller, Mrs. Mackenzie, and Mrs. Curzon, with the power to add others. The committee waited upon Oliver Mowat, who was then the Premier of Ontario. From the beginning, the members of the Association recognized that it would be manifestly unjust to exclude married women from the exercise of the franchise, bestowing it only on widows and single women. However, it was agreed that it was not politic to criticize the franchise bill before the House, on the principle of 'half a loaf being better than no bread'. Accordingly, objections were set aside, and every woman worked towards securing this partial reform, even though, if married, she would not directly benefit by it.

=== Woman's Medical College ===
Another important work accomplished about this time, more or less directly through the influence of the Suffrage Association, was the opening of the Woman's Medical College in Toronto. Stowe (with her friend, Jennie Kidd Trout) had, in the 1870s, forced her way into a season's lectures on chemistry in the Toronto School of Medicine. About 1879, she intimated her intention of entering her daughter, Augusta Stowe, as a medical student. Dr. Augusta Stowe Gullen was awarded her degree of M. D. C. M. in 1883, the first woman to be awarded such a degree under Canadian institutions. As a consequence of the persistence of Stowe and her daughter, other women became aware of the possibilities in the medical profession, and so numerous were the applications for admission that it was deemed expedient to open a Woman's Medical College in Toronto. Gullen was appointed Demonstrator in Anatomy.

After the labour involved in securing the municipal suffrage in 1883, and later, in struggling for the opening of the Woman's Medical College, there was a lull until 1889, when Stowe made arrangements to bring Dr. Anna Howard Shaw to Toronto to lecture.

Stowe sent out 4,000 invitations, to every member of Parliament, council, school board, and ministerial association, inviting each member to be present to hear about the Woman Question. The lecture was a success, creating so much interest in the matter that the old suffrage association, which had been practically non-existent for several seasons, was re-organized, with Stowe as president, and Sarah Anne Curzon as secretary. In December 1889, Susan B. Anthony was secured to lecture in the Woman's Medical College auditorium. She succeeded in increasing interest in suffrage work, until it spread from the women of Toronto to those of surrounding towns, with new groups organizing in many places. Next, the Association secured Mary Seymour Howell, of Albany, New York, to lecture. Mrs. McDonell, ever indefatigable in her zeal for women, accompanied Howell to many towns throughout Ontario, to stimulate suffrage clubs already in existence and to form others.

Also in 1889, the Women's Suffrage Association became the Dominion Women's Enfranchisement Association.

== 1890s ==
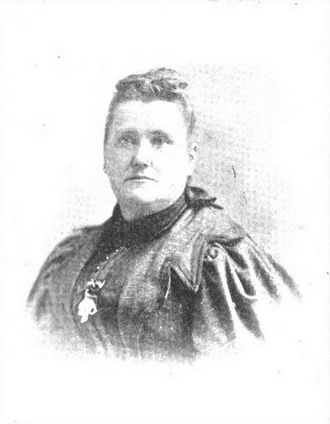
Dr. Amelia Yeomans

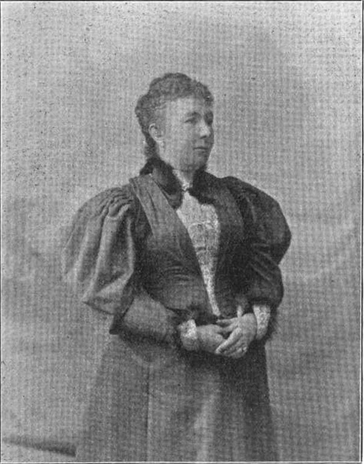
Edith Archibald

In early 1890, it was believed that a Dominion Woman's Enfranchisement Convention might be assembled. This convention was duly announced to be held in Association Hall, Toronto, June 12–13, 1890. Delegates were received from the various Suffrage Clubs then existing. Also, there were representatives from American Clubs, including: Dr. Hannah A. Kimball, Chicago; Rev. Anna Shaw, Isabella Hooker (sister of Henry Ward Beecher), and McLellan Brown, lawyer and president of a Cincinnati college. The papers that elicited most attention were: "The Ballot, its Relation to Economics; " "Woman as Wage-Earner", and "Woman in the Medical Profession".

Yellow, the colour of gold, and the symbol of wisdom in the East, was the badge of equal suffragists all over the continent, and was used for decorations at all meetings of the hall. Some of the mottoes used were "Canada's Daughters Should be Free", "No Sex in Citizenship", "Women are half the People", and "Woman, Man's Equal". The Dominion Woman's Enfranchisement Association became duly incorporated.

In 1890, in accordance with the desire of the Equal-Suffragists, Mayor Edward Frederick Clarke and the Toronto City Council determined to invite the Association for the Advancement of Women (A.A.W.), to hold its 18th annual Congress in Toronto. Some of the women who attended and contributed were: Julia Ward Howe, author and litterateur, the friend and associate of Emerson, Longfellow, and Holmes; Mary F. Eastman, one of the leading New England educationists; Alice Stone Blackwell, editor of the Woman's Journal, and daughter of the Rev. Lucy Stone; Clara Berwick Colby, editor of the Woman's Tribune in Beatrice, Nebraska, in 1883; Rev. Florence E. Kalloch, of Chicago; Mrs. Kate Tannatt Woods, journalist and writer.

In 1895, the Equal Suffragists in Manitoba were under the leadership of Dr. Amelia Yeomans. She indicated that the women of the W.C.T.U. were the first to espouse equal suffrage in Manitoba, having twice brought largely signed petitions before the Provincial Legislature. As early as 1872, the statutes in British Columbia were written so as to give married women a vote in municipal matters. By 1895 in Quebec, women for many years had exercised the municipal franchise, although historically, when it was held that a woman would be polluted by entering a polling-booth, it was customary for a notary to call upon the Quebec women in their homes, where they would, in his presence, record their vote without leaving their chair. Prince Edward Island was the only province in Canada in which there was no legislation regarding woman suffrage. Not even the municipal franchise had been conferred for a supermajority of electoral districts. In 1892, amidst deliberations in the 31st General Assembly of Prince Edward Island over the "Bill respecting the Legislature" (popularly known as the "Amalgamation Bill"), Neil McLeod, Leader of the Opposition, attempted to extend provincial suffrage to unmarried women. He prefaced his motion for an amendment to Section 52 of the bill by asking whether "a femme sole [is] a British subject, who has any one of the qualifications contained in sub-sections c, g, h, i, j, k, and l." Frederick Peters, "Leader of the Government" and chair of the Liberal Party, conjectured that the amendment was "simply introduced to gain a little cheap popularity. He has failed to receive this from the male portion of the country and he now strikes out in another line and endeavors to get a little from the females." McLeod, instead of a rejoinder, concluded the doomed motion: "I contend that women are at least as sober, intelligent, and moral as men, and that unmarried women possessing property, and liable to perform statute labor and pay taxes, ought to have the right to vote." Limiting the vote to unmarried women also diminished the frequency of intersections between legitimate children, hyperdescent, and suffrage. In New Brunswick, Sarah Manning, of St. John, was president of the W.E.A. In the Maritime Provinces, Edith Archibald was president of the Maritime W.C.T.U. and was perhaps, the pioneer suffragist of Nova Scotia. Mrs. Leon Owens was president of the Dominion Women's Enfranchisement Association (W.E.A.) of Halifax.

== Suffrage continued ==
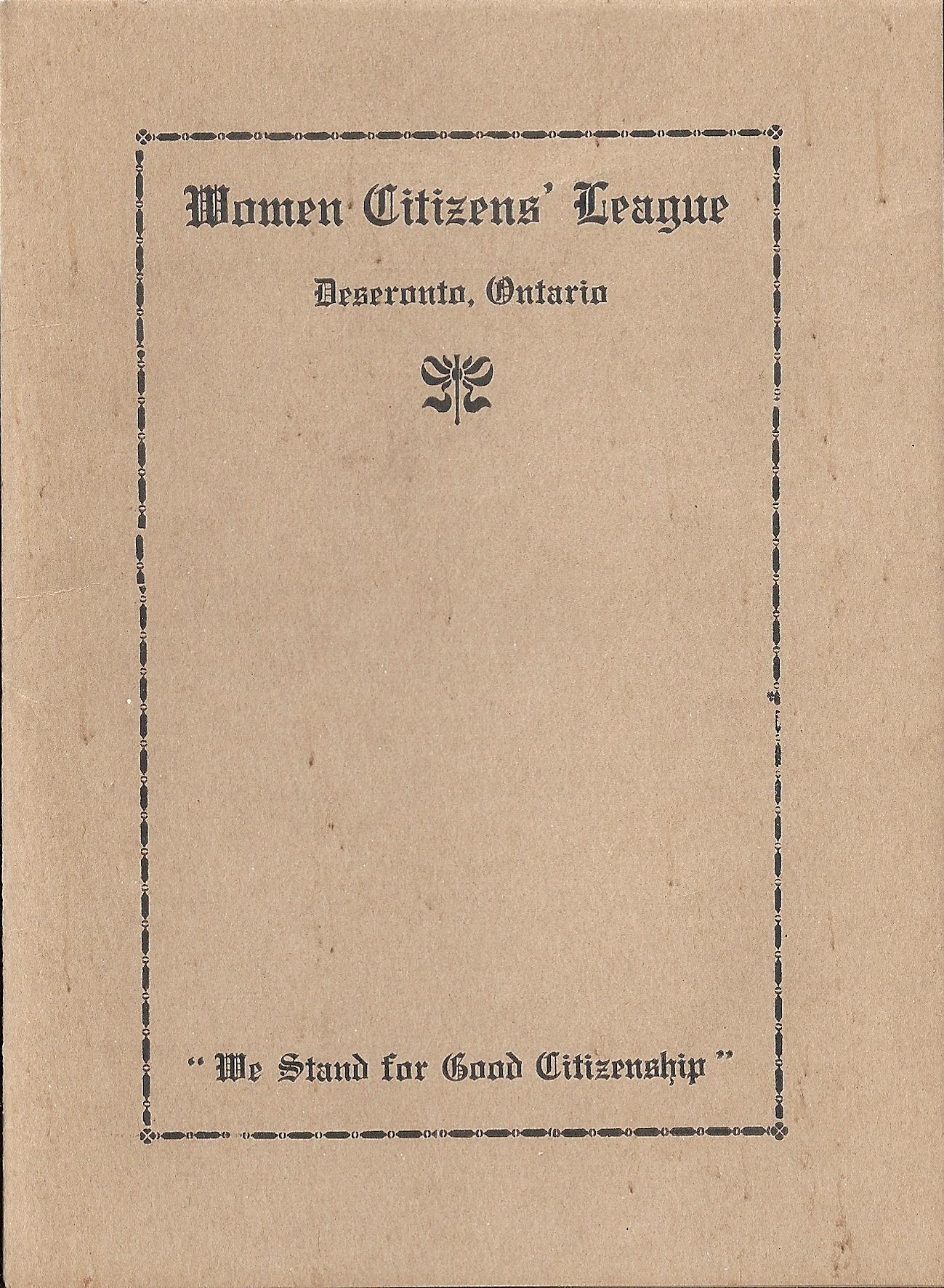
Front page of a printed constitution for the Women Citizens' League, Deseronto, Ontario (1929)

The previously listed events regarding women's suffrage were only in accordance with White women's suffrage. Slavery in Canada meant that Black persons were legally deemed chattel property and not considered "people", and therefore did not possess the rights and freedoms granted to citizens, such as democratic participation. As slavery was gradually being abolished, Black persons were slowly being granted rights as British subjects from 1793 to 1834. As British subjects, they were entitled to civil rights, but this was extended only to property-owning men, as a gender barrier still existed for all women.

Manitoba was the first province to grant the right to vote to women, which extended to both White and Black women. Alberta and Saskatchewan followed soon after, as did BC after its passage in a 1916 referendum.

The controversial Wartime Elections Act that passed on September 20, 1917, granted the federal vote to women associated with the armed forces. On May 24, 1918, the Women's Franchise Act was enacted, that granted female citizens over the age of 21 the federal vote, regardless if their province had approved enfranchisement. Women gained the right to run as Members of Parliament in 1919. In the next federal election in 1921, Agnes McPhail was elected to the House of Commons. The right to vote still had not been granted to Asian and Indigenous women.

In the 19th and 20th century, Asian peoples began immigrating to Canada and were denied the right to vote in both provincial and federal elections. As well, Canadians with Asian heritage were denied the right to vote. In 1920, the Dominion Elections Act was passed by Parliament. It stated that provinces could not discriminate against people based on differences in ethnicity, but this still excluded Canadians of Asian heritage, meaning they were still denied the right to vote. The Dominion Elections Act was rescinded in 1948, and a new law went into effect in 1949. The disenfranchisement of Asian Canadians was finally put to an end after World War II.

In 1920, the Indian Act was amended to allow for "involuntary enfranchisement" for Indigenous men. Only certain Indigenous men were deemed worthy for enfranchisement, such as those with a university degree. There was a poor response to the amendment which resulted in objections from Indigenous communities, which led the amendment to be repealed. Voluntary enfranchisement was introduced after the amendment. In 1960, Parliament passed the Canada Elections Act which granted all registered "Indians" the right to vote. The intention behind the legislation was threefold. The first factor being that the Canadian government did not want to mirror the actions of the American government in denying African-Americans the right to vote. Secondly, the newly introduced Canadian Bill of Rights made reference to non-discrimination (prior to the Canadian Charter of Rights and Freedoms). Finally, this was seen as a step towards decolonization and increased autonomy for Indigenous communities.

As well, until 1985, a First Nations woman marrying a man with the vote (i.e. a non-First Nations man or a non-Asian man) was automatically enfranchised, as were any children that she bore. This also meant that she and her children would lose their official "Indian" status, including the rights to live on a First Nations reserve, although a First Nations man did not lose his status in this way, when marrying a non-First Nations woman.

Once Indigenous peoples became enfranchised and removed from coverage of the Indian Act, they were granted rights identical to that of other Canadian citizens.

== Timeline ==
Timeline: Women and the Right to Vote in Canada
| Date | Jurisdiction | Statute | Effect | First Minister and Party |
|---|---|---|---|---|
| 1916: January 28 | Manitoba | An Act to amend "The Manitoba Election Act" | Right to vote for women on same terms as men: British subject, 21 years old or older, and resident in Manitoba for at least one year; not federally appointed judges, "Indians or persons of Indian blood receiving an annuity or treaty money from the Crown", persons disqualified for corrupt electoral practices, and persons of unsound mind or prisoners confined in prisons or asylums. | Tobias Norris: Liberal |
| 1916: March 14 | Saskatchewan | An Act to amend the Statute Law | Right to vote for women on same terms as men: British subject, 21 or older, and resident in Saskatchewan for at least a year; not federally appointed judge, "Persons of the Chinese race", "Indians", persons disqualified for corrupt electoral practices, prisoner in jail, nor patient in a "lunatic asylum". | Walter Scott: Liberal |
| 1916: April 19 | Alberta | The Equal Suffrage Statutory Law Amendment Act | Right to vote for women on same terms as men: British subject, 21 or older, and resident in Alberta for at least a year; not federally appointed judge, person disqualified from voting for corrupt election practices, prisoner in jail, nor patient in "lunatic asylum", nor "Indian". | Arthur Sifton: Liberal |
| 1916: May 31, 1916 | British Columbia | Provincial Elections Act Amendment Act, 1916; Woman Suffrage Act | Right to vote for women on same terms as men, and subject to same exceptions, if approved by a referendum | William John Bowser: Conservative |
| 1917: April 5 | British Columbia | Provincial Elections Act Amendment Act, 1917 | Right to vote for women on same terms as men: Natural-born British subject, met literacy test, resided in province for six months; not person convicted of treason or indictable offence, federally appointed judge, British sailor, marine or soldier living within barracks or naval yards; any "Chinaman, Japanese, Hindu or Indian", or any person convicted of electoral bribery or personation. | Harlan Carey Brewster: Liberal |
| 1917: April 12 | Ontario | The Election Law Amendment Act, 1917; The Ontario Franchise Act, 1917 | Right to vote for women on same terms as men: British subject, aged 21 or older, lived in Canada for at least nine months and was not otherwise disqualified; not judge, Crown attorney or various public servant, prisoner in jail, patient in hospital for the insane, person living in charitable institutions, or "unenfranchised Indian of whole or part blood", residing among Indians or on an Indian reserve. | Sir William Howard Hearst: Conservative |
| 1917: September 20 | Federal | Military Voters Act | Vote extended to "every person, male or female" who was a British subject serving in the Canadian military, "whether or not an Indian" and any British subject ordinarily resident in Canada who was serving in any of the other Imperial military services, "whether or not an Indian", for the duration of the war. | Sir Robert Borden: Unionist |
| 1917: September 20 | Federal | The War-time Elections Act | Vote given to women who were the wives, widows, mothers, sisters or daughters of men or women who were serving with the Canadian or British military, until the end of the war; required to meet voting requirements for "age, race, and residence" under provincial law where they resided. | Sir Robert Borden: Unionist |
| 1918: April 26 | Nova Scotia | Nova Scotia Franchise Act | Right to vote for women on same terms as for men: British subjects, 21 or older, and meeting property qualifications. | George Henry Murray: Liberal |
| 1918: May 24 | Federal | An Act to confer the Electoral Franchise upon Women | Right to vote for women on same terms as for men: British subject, aged 21 or older, and meeting qualifications to vote for men in the province of residence (in effect January 1, 1919). | Sir Robert Borden: Unionist |
| 1919: April 17 | New Brunswick | An Act to extend the electoral franchise to women, and to amend the New Brunswick Elections Act | Right to vote for women on same terms as men: British subject, aged 21 or older, residence in New Brunswick; not prisoner in jail, patient in a "lunatic asylum", inmate in charitable institution, Indian, judge of the Supreme Court of the province. Women not eligible for election to the Legislative Assembly until 1944. | Walter Edward Foster: Liberal |
| 1919: May 20 | Yukon | An Ordinance respecting Elections | Women "shall be upon an absolute equality ... with men": British subjects, 21 years or older, residence in Yukon; did not include Indians. | George P. MacKenzie: Commissioner of Yukon (Note: Yukon Territory did not have political parties or responsible government in 1919. The Commissioner, appointed by the federal government, was the head of government. The vote was granted to women in Yukon, other than Indians, during the government of Prime Minister Sir Robert Borden (Unionist).) |
| 1922: May 3 | Prince Edward Island | Election Act, 1922 | Right to vote for women same as for men: British subjects, aged 21 or older, resident in Prince Edward Island, property qualification; did not include "an Indian ordinarily resident in an Indian reservation". | John Howatt Bell: Liberal |
| 1925: April 3 | Newfoundland and Labrador (Note: Newfoundland was a separate Dominion from Canada until 1949.) | House of Assembly Amendment Act | From 1925 onwards, women had right to vote, but with an age difference from men: both had to be British subjects and resident in Newfoundland, but only women aged 25 and older had right to vote, while men 21 and older had right to vote; did not change until 1954, when voting age for women lowered to 21 and older. | Walter Stanley Monroe: Liberal-Conservative-Progressive Party |
| 1940: April 25 | Quebec | An Act granting to women the right to vote and to be eligible as candidates | Right to vote for women same as for men: British subject, aged 21 or older, domiciled in the electoral division, and not disqualified under the act; did not include judges, "Indians and individuals of Indian blood domiciled on lands reserved for Indians", person who has taken allegiance to a foreign country, person found guilty of electoral misconduct, person found guilty of an offence with more than two years and imprisonment and still serving the sentence, and persons who lack contractual capacity under the Civil Code. | Adélard Godbout: Liberal |
| 1951: June 12 | Northwest Territories | Elections Ordinance | Equality of voting status from the first election of Council members in 1951 | Hugh Andrew Young: Commissioner of the Northwest Territories (Note: The Northwest Territories did not have political parties or responsible government in 1951. The Commissioner, appointed by the federal government, was the head of government. In 1951, the federal government was Liberal, under Prime Minister Louis St. Laurent.) |
| 1999: April 1 | Nunavut | Nunavut Elections Act, Statutes of Nunavut 2002, c. 17, which repealed and replaced the Elections Act, Revised Statutes of Northwest Territories (Nu) 1988, c. E-2, which was temporarily in force in Nunavut | Equality of voting status since creation of Nunavut. Prior to the creation of Nunavut, women held full voting rights in the Northwest Territories from the first election of Council members in 1951. | |
Source: Library of Parliament Parl Info: Women's Right to Vote in Canada

== See also ==
- Margret Benedictsson, an Icelandic immigrant to Manitoba and prominent suffragist
- List of electoral firsts in Canada.
- List of Canadian suffragists and suffragettes
