= 50 United Nations Plaza =

Residential skyscraper in Manhattan, New York

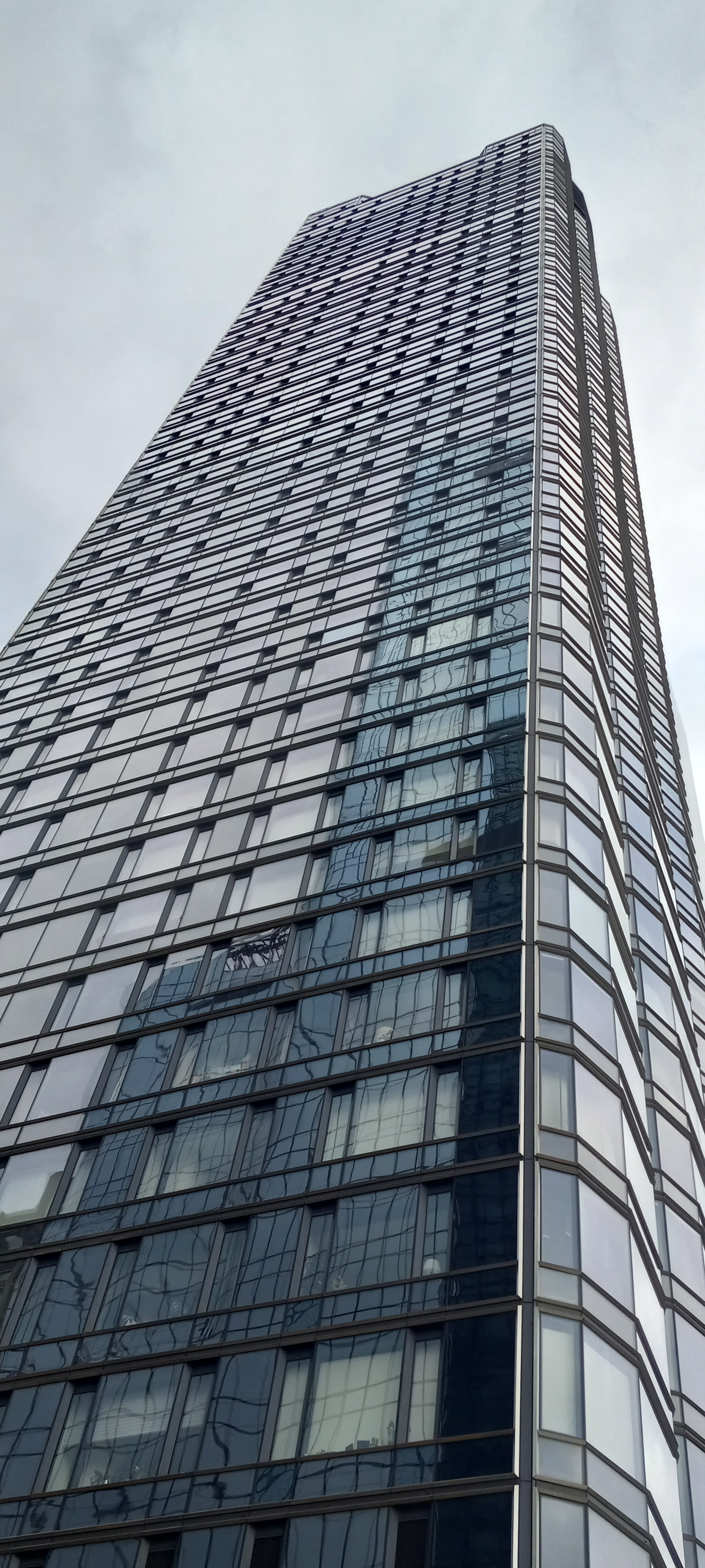
- The building in 2024
- Interactive map of the 50 United Nations Plaza area

General information
- Type: Residential
- Location: Manhattan, New York City
- Coordinates: 40°45′6″N 73°58′5″W
- Construction started: 2012
- Completed: 2015

Technical details
- Floor count: 44

Design and construction
- Architect: Foster and Partners
- Developer: Zeckendorf family

50 United Nations Plaza is a residential condominium building in Manhattan, New York City. The 44-story tower, designed by Norman Foster's architectural firm Foster and Partners, is the first residential high-rise building in the United States designed by Foster. It is variously described as having 87 or 88 apartments.

== History ==
The vacant lot was acquired by Zeckendorf Development for US$160 million in 2007. On November 14, 2012, the Zeckendorf family announced the beginning of construction, alongside Israeli billionaire investor Eyal Ofer as a partner. It was topped out during July 2013.

== Tenants ==
In April 2015, the government of Qatar acquired four apartments (19B, 33B, 27B, and Penthouse 35) for a combined total of US$45 million. By July 2015, the penthouse, which has an outdoors swimming-pool, was listed on the real estate market for US$70 million.

In 2015, the New Zealand Ministry of Foreign Affairs and Trade purchased a unit at 50 UN Plaza for US$7.9 million (slightly under NZ$11 million) for its permanent representative to the UN. The real estate deal formally listed the purchaser as "her Majesty the Queen in right of New Zealand" because Queen Elizabeth II, as monarch, was New Zealand's head of state.

After previously leasing a penthouse at the Waldorf-Astoria hotel for its Ambassador to the United Nations, the United States government relocated the ambassadorial residence to 50 United Nations Plaza. The United States initially rented a 40th floor penthouse apartment, but later purchased a different penthouse on the 37th floor. Nikki Haley was the first ambassador to reside in the 40th floor penthouse, which rented at US$58,000 per month. The 37th-floor, five-bedroom, six-and-a-half-bath penthouse was purchased in May 2019 for $15.85 million.

In November 2017, Neil and Mindy Grossman purchased unit 29A at 50 United Nations Plaza, for US$5.65 million.

In 2019, the British Government acquired a 5,893-square-foot full-floor penthouse on the 38th floor of 50 United Nations Plaza, for the UK's trade commissioner for North America and consul general in New York, Antony Phillipson, for 12 million British pounds, or about US$15.8 million. Zeckendorf Development said at the time that more than 80% of the building's units had been sold. The British Foreign Office's purchase of the residence as a "grace and favour" home was criticized by some in Britain, as it came during a long period of austerity measures.

In 2018, a three-bedroom unit in the building was offered for rent at US$19,000 a month. In 2022, six apartments in the building were listed for rent, including the penthouse, which at the time was listed for $75,000 a month; a foreign tenant was in the process of leasing that unit.

In 2020, the Consulate General of Kuwait purchased Penthouse 40 in the building for US$16.1 million.
