= Edward Archibald =

Edward Archibald may refer to:

- Edward Archibald (athlete) (1884–1965), Canadian Olympic pole-vaulter
- Edward Mortimer Archibald (1810–1884), Nova Scotian / British lawyer and diplomat
- Edward William Archibald (1872–1945), Canadian surgeon
