= List of Canadian suffragists and suffragettes =

This is a list of Canadian suffragists and suffragettes who were born in Canada or whose lives and works are closely associated with that country.

== Suffragists and suffragettes ==
- Edith Archibald (1854–1936) – writer who led the Maritime Women's Christian Temperance Union and the National Council of Women of Canada and the Local Council of Women of Halifax
- Francis Marion Beynon (1884–1951) – Canadian journalist, feminist and pacifist
- Laura Borden (1861–1940) – wife of Sir Robert Laird Borden, the eighth Prime Minister of Canada
- Thérèse Forget Casgrain (1896–1981) – leader of the Quebec suffragist movement
- Henrietta Muir Edwards (1849–1931) – women's rights activist and reformer
- Henry Robert Emmerson (1853–1914) – Premier of New Brunswick and advocate of women's suffrage
- Helena Gutteridge (1879–1960) – first woman elected to city council in Vancouver
- Gertrude Harding (1889–1977) – one of the highest-ranking and longest-lasting members of the Women's Social and Political Union
- Lily Laverock (1880–1969) – journalist, impresario and suffragist
- Anna Leonowens (1831–1915) – travel writer, educator and social activist
- Genevieve Lipsett (1885–1935) – journalist, teacher and suffragist
- Elizabeth Roberts MacDonald (1864–1922) – writer; president, Women's Suffrage Association of Nelson, British Columbia
- Nellie McClung (1873–1951) – politician, author, social activist, member of The Famous Five
- Sarah Galt Elwood McKee (1842–1934) – social reformer and temperance leader
- Louise McKinney (1868–1931) – politician, women's rights activist, Alberta legislature
- Emily Murphy (1868–1933) – women's rights activist, jurist, author
- Irene Parlby (1868–1965) – women's farm leader, activist, politician
- Katherine Ross Queen (1885–1934) – feminist and socialist
- Eliza Ritchie (1856–1933) – educator and member of the executive of the Local Council of Women of Halifax
- Octavia Ritchie (1868–1948) – physician
- Emily Stowe (1831–1903) – doctor, campaigned for the country's first medical college for women
- Jennie Fowler Willing (1834–1916) – educator, author, preacher, social reformer, suffragist
- Sarah Rowell Wright (1862–1930) - Vice-president, National Suffrage Association; temperance reformer, newspaper editor

== See also ==
- List of suffragists and suffragettes
- Timeline of women's suffrage
