= Hannah Young =

British civil servant and diplomat

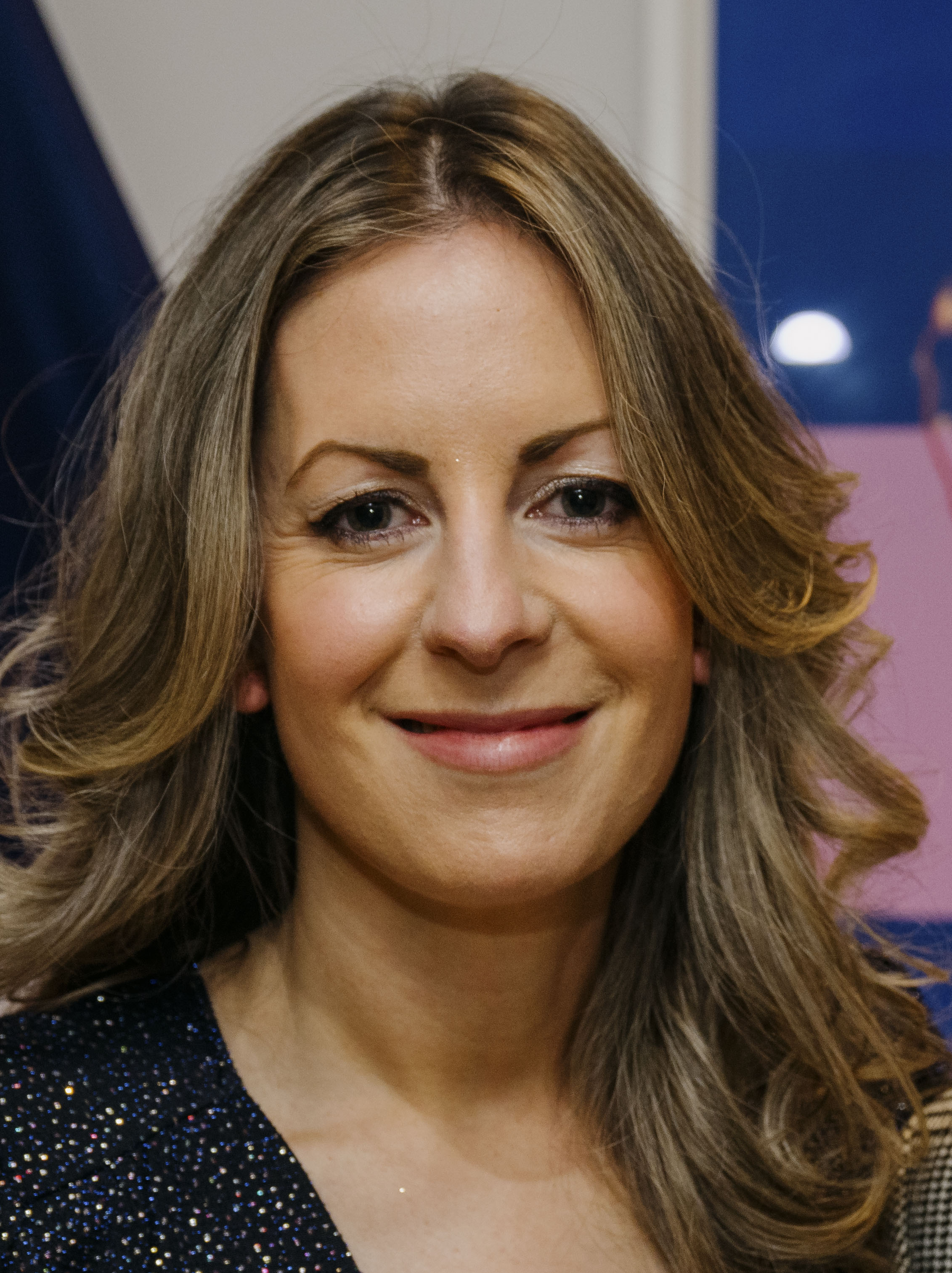
- Young in 2024

British Consul-General in New York
- In office January 2024 – November 2024

Deputy Consul General to New York
- In office 2020–2024

Hannah Young is a former British civil servant and diplomat. She served as British Consul-General in New York from January to November 2024.

== Career ==
Born in Watford, England, Young worked for the Department for Exiting the European Union, the Prime Minister's Delivery Unit and the Cabinet Office and spent three years as a diplomat in Afghanistan before becoming the Prime Minister's lead official on home affairs policy at No. 10 Downing Street under Boris Johnson. Her leaving party on 18 June 2020 was one of the gatherings investigated as part of the partygate inquiry, resulting in fixed penalty notices.

After moving to the British Consulate General in New York, Young became acting Consul-General in 2021, then Deputy Consul-General. From January to November 2024, she served as Consul-General (the role of Trade Commissioner for North America having been separated from the role of Consul-General).

In 2024, Young unveiled a plaque at Saint Thomas Church in New York to mark the 100th anniversary of the city's twinning with York in England. She also served as honorary chair of the Saint Andrew's Society of the State of New York and honorary president of the Saint George's Society of New York.

Following her departure from the role of Consul-General, Hannah announced her transfer to the private sector in joining Standard Industries as VP Special Projects in New York.

Diplomatic posts
| Preceded by Emma Wade-Smith (as Consul-General and Trade Commissioner for North America) | British Consul-General in New York; 2024 | Succeeded by Oliver Christian |
