= Sarah Galt Elwood McKee =

Canadian social reformer and temperance leader (1842 – 1934)

Sarah G. E. McKee (North Bay Nugget, 1934)

Sarah Galt Elwood McKee (1842–1934) was a Canadian social reformer and temperance leader. For many years, she worked actively in several fields of philanthropic work. McKee served as president of the Ontario Woman's Christian Temperance Union (WCTU).

== Early life and education ==
Sarah Galt Elwood was born at Dundas, Ontario, January 21, 1842. Her parents were James Galt and Mary (Caldwell) Elwood.

After the family moved to Kemptville, she was educated in the local public and high schools.

In 1858, the family moved to Brockville, Eastern Ontario.

== Career ==
McKee worked as a social reformer in several branches of philanthropic work.

Interested in the temperance reform movement from early adulthood, McKee identified herself with the Independent Order of Good Templars (IOGT), the Sons of Temperance, the WCTU, as well as the Dominion Alliance for the Total Suppression of the Liquor Traffic on which she served for 22 years as a member of its executive committee.

Her connection with the WCTU began in Simcoe County, Ontario, where she served for 25 years as local and county president. In 1900, she was elected president of the Ontario WCTU, which office she held for ten years; he was made honorary president of that Union in 1910. She served for 12 years as vice-president of the Dominion of Canada WCTU. She was for 24 years on the publication board of Canada's White Ribbon Tidings. McKee was for many years superintendent of the Department of Work Among Miners and Lumbermen for the World's WCTU. She twice represented the Dominion at World Conventions of the WCTU.

McKee favored equal suffrage, total Prohibition of the liquor traffic, and independence in politics. During World War I, she engaged in temperance work among the Canadian soldiers and sailors.

== Personal life ==
In religion, McKee was Presbyterian.

On May 20, 1864, she married the Rev. Thomas McKee, J.P.S., inspector of schools at Brockville. The couple had five sons and three daughters. Rev. and Mrs. McKee removed to North Bay, Ontario, in 1913. He died there the following year, and she died there on March 24, 1934.
