= Francis Evans (diplomat) =

British diplomat

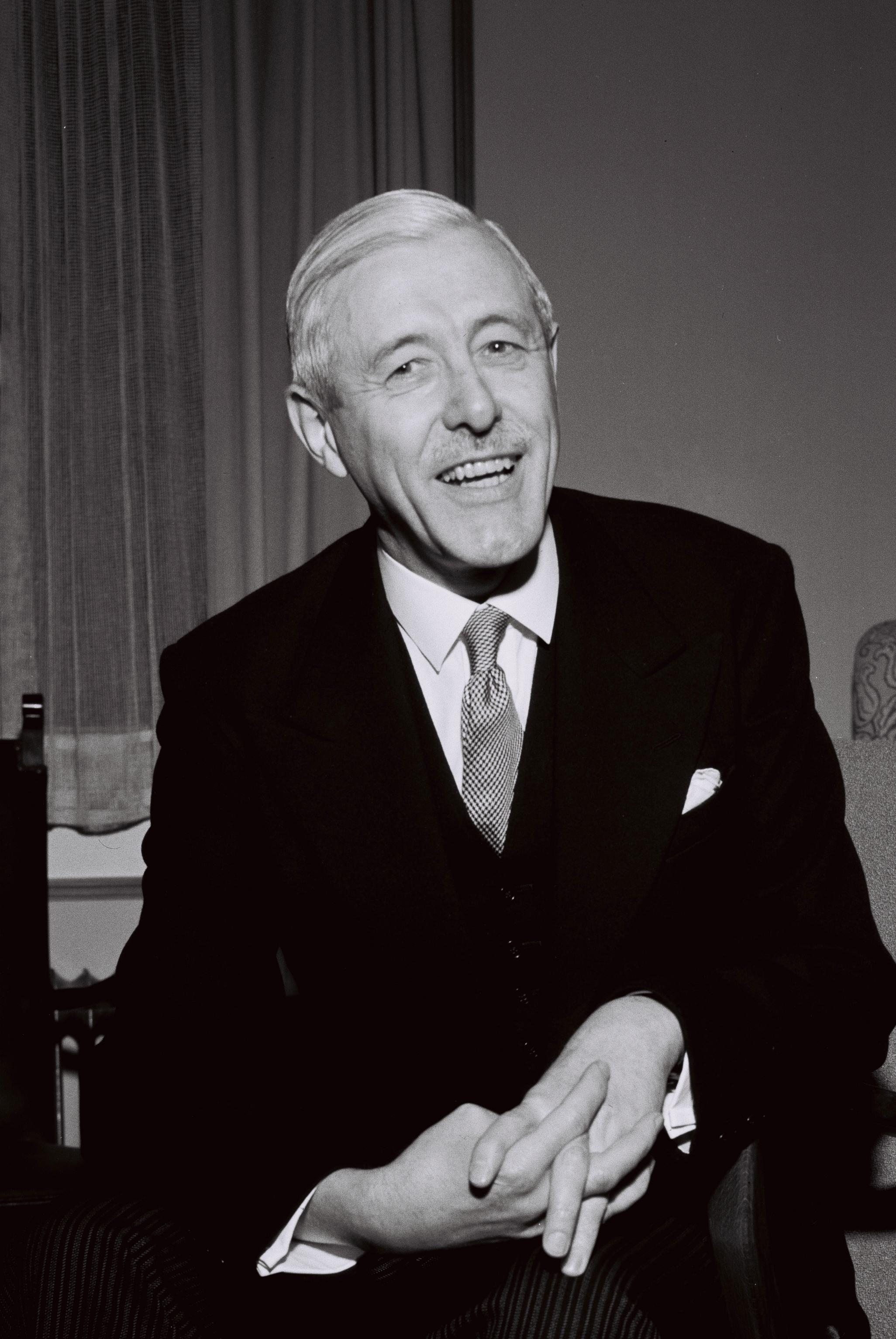
Francis Evans, 1951.

Sir Francis Edward Evans GBE KCMG DL (4 April 1897 – 21 August 1983) was a British diplomat.

== Early life and education ==
Born in Belfast, Ireland, he was educated at the city's Belfast Royal Academy before being commissioned as a second lieutenant in the Royal Irish Rifles in December 1916. After serving in the First World War, he entered the civil service in 1919, and the following year completed a course for new consular entrants at the London School of Economics.

== Diplomatic career ==
Between 1920 and 1926 Evans was the British vice-consul at New York City, and for another three years after that at Boston. In 1929, he was sent to Colón, Panama, remaining there until 1932, when he again returned to the United States. He subsequently spent five years as consul at Los Angeles, and after a period at the Foreign Office he returned to New York as consul general there, an appointment he held until 1950.

In 1951 Evans became under-secretary of state at the Foreign Office, and the following year he was appointed British ambassador to Israel, having become minister there the previous year. This was immediately followed in 1954 by his appointment as ambassador to Argentina, a post he held for three years before retiring.

From 1957 to 1965, he was chairman of the Northern Ireland Development Council, and from 1962 and 1966 he also served as the agent for the Northern Ireland Government in Great Britain.

== Awards ==
He was appointed a Companion of the Order of Saint Michael and Saint George (CMG) in the 1944 New Year Honours and promoted to Knight Commander of the Order (KCMG) in the 1946 New Year Honours, and appointed a Knight Grand Cross of the Order of the British Empire (GBE) in the 1957 Birthday Honours. He was the recipient of honorary degrees from the Queen's University of Belfast, the University of Ulster and Ripon College, Wisconsin. He was also made a deputy lieutenant of Belfast. He was appointed a Commander (Brother) of the Order of St John in 1961.

== Personal life ==
For many years Evans served on the Board of Governors of his old school, Belfast Royal Academy.

He married Mary, Lady Evans, in 1920. She died seven years before him in 1976. There were no children of the marriage.
