= Amelia Yeomans =

Canadian physician and suffragist

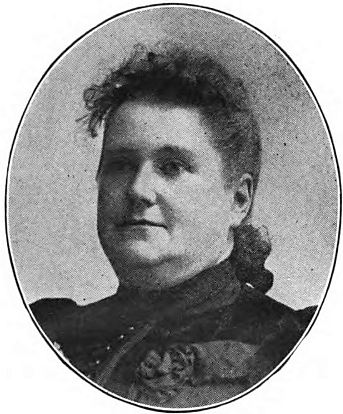
- Born: Amelia Le Sueur; March 29, 1842; Quebec City
- Died: April 22, 1913 (aged 71); Calgary
- Education: University of Michigan
- Occupation: Physician
- Spouse: Augustus A. Yeomans (1860-1878, his death)
- Children: 2
- Parent(s): Peter Le Sueur; Barbara Dawson

Amelia Yeomans (née Le Sueur; March 29, 1842 – April 22, 1913) was a Canadian physician and suffragist. She and her adult daughter Lilian B. Yeomans, M.D., were the first female physicians in Manitoba.

== Early life and education ==
Yeomans was born on March 29, 1842, in Quebec City, Canada East, to Peter Le Sueur and Barbara Dawson. Her father was a civil servant. She was privately educated. Le Sueur married Augustus A. Yeomans, a medical doctor, on October 16, 1860, in Quebec City. They had two daughters.

After Augustus's death in 1878, Amelia Yeomans, along with her daughter Lilian, decided to enter the medical profession. Since Canadian medical schools did not accept women students, Yeomans and her daughter enrolled in the Ann Arbor Medical School at the University of Michigan. Yeomans received her degree in 1883. She then moved to Winnipeg, where Lilian was already practicing midwifery and medicine. Yeomans's second daughter, Charlotte, became a nurse and joined the family in Winnipeg in 1890.

== Career ==
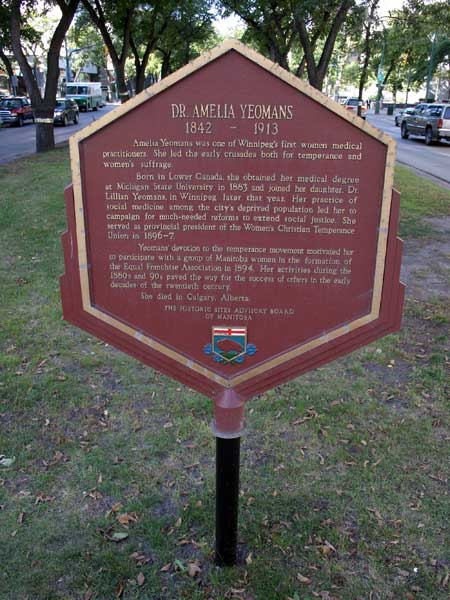
Plaque honoring Dr. Amelia Yeomans, Winnipeg

As physicians, Yeomans and her daughter frequently treated sex workers, homeless women, and others being held in the local jail. These experiences led Yeomans to write a pamphlet educating women about sexually transmitted diseases. The pamphlet was released by the Women's Christian Temperance Union (WCTU).

The WCTU was the first English-speaking organization in Manitoba to espouse women's suffrage. In 1893, the first year of recorded WCTU activity, Yeomans served as an officer for the organization. On February 9, 1893, Yeomans and the WCTU staged a mock parliament in the Bijou Theatre in Winnipeg, organized by Arminda Myrtal Blakely, and invited the Manitoba legislature to attend. Yeomans played the premier, while other members, including Nellie Letitia Monney and Ella Cora Hind, presented pro and con arguments.

In 1894, Yeomans helped to form the Equal Franchise Association in Manitoba.

Yeomans served as the provincial president of the WCTU from 1896 to 1897.

== Later life and death ==
Yeomans's daughter Charlotte moved to Calgary for work in 1904, and both Yeomans and Lilian followed her there. Lilian would later become a pentecostal evangelist.

Amelia Yeomans died on April 22, 1913, in Calgary.
