= Emma Wade-Smith =

British diplomat

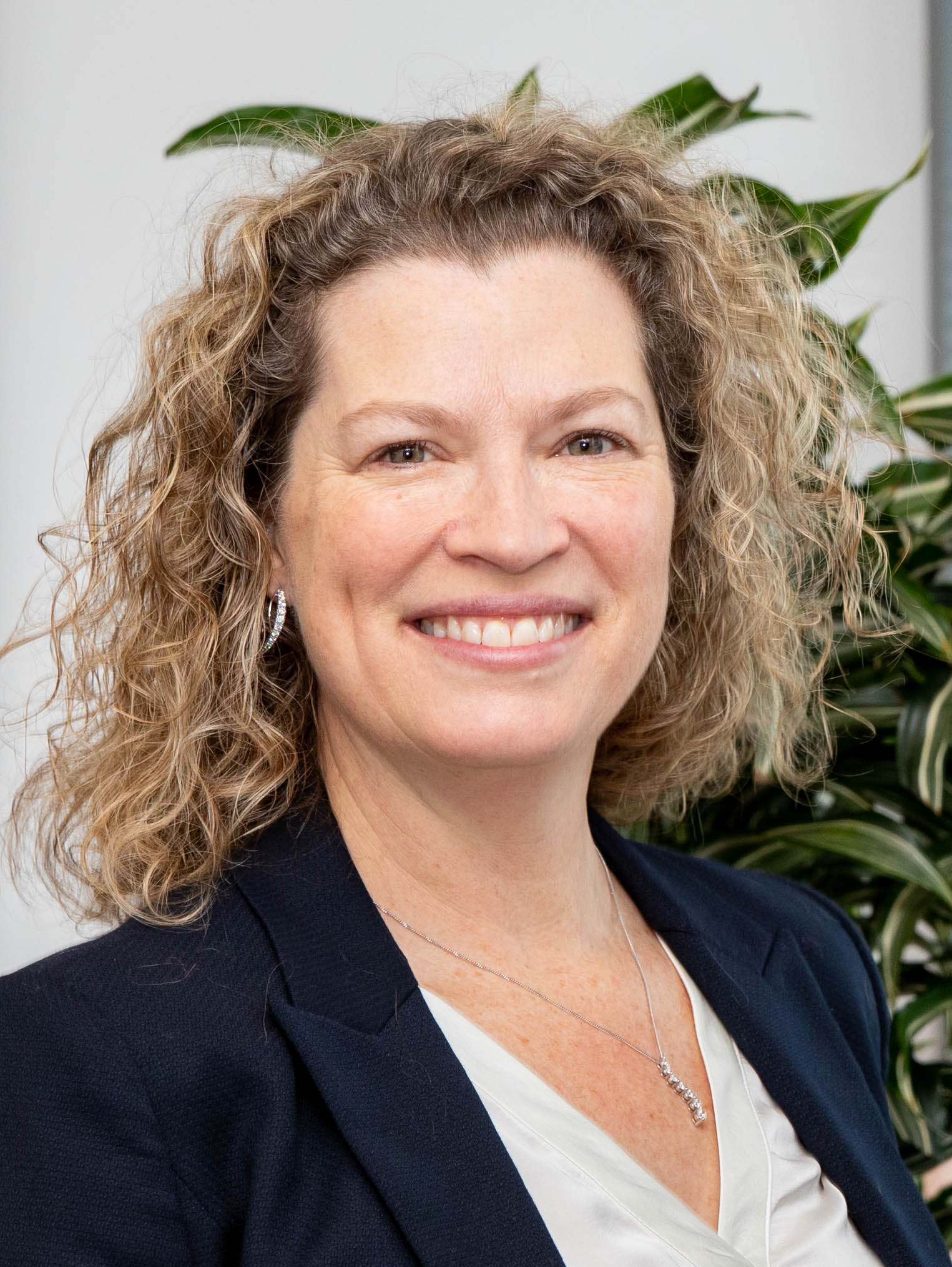
Emma Wade-Smith in 2023

Emma Wade-Smith OBE is a senior executive for the De Beers diamond company and a former British diplomat. She served as British Consul-General in New York and Trade Commissioner for North America from 2021 to 2024.

== Career ==
Having joined the diplomatic service at the age of 20, Wade-Smith's postings included Mexico, Chile, the United Nations in New York and the European Commission in Brussels. She also worked on international trade matters at the Department for Business, Innovation and Skills and headed the International Crisis Response Team from 2009 to 2011, for which she was made an Officer of the Order of the British Empire (OBE).

After working at the British Embassy in Washington, D.C., Wade-Smith then spent six years as the United Kingdom's Trade Commissioner for Africa before being appointed Consul-General in New York and Trade Commissioner for North America in 2021. In 2022 she was made honorary president of the Saint George's Society of New York.

In 2024 Wade-Smith joined the De Beers diamond company as senior vice-president for government affairs.

Diplomatic posts
Preceded by Antony Phillipson	British Consul-General in New York and Trade Commissioner for North America; 2021−2024	Succeeded by Hannah Young
