= List of ambassadors of the United States to the United Nations =

Permanent Representative of the United States of America to the United Nations
- Seal of the U.S. Mission to the United Nations

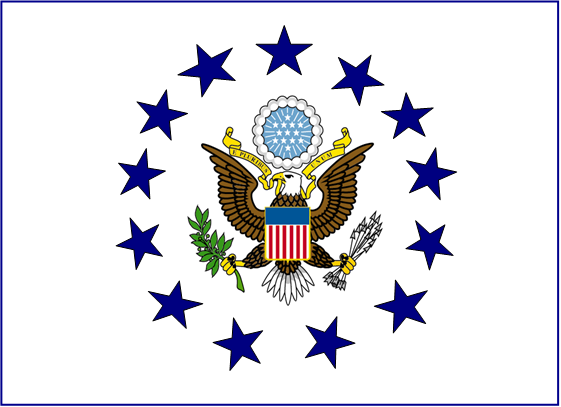
- Flag of a United States chief of mission

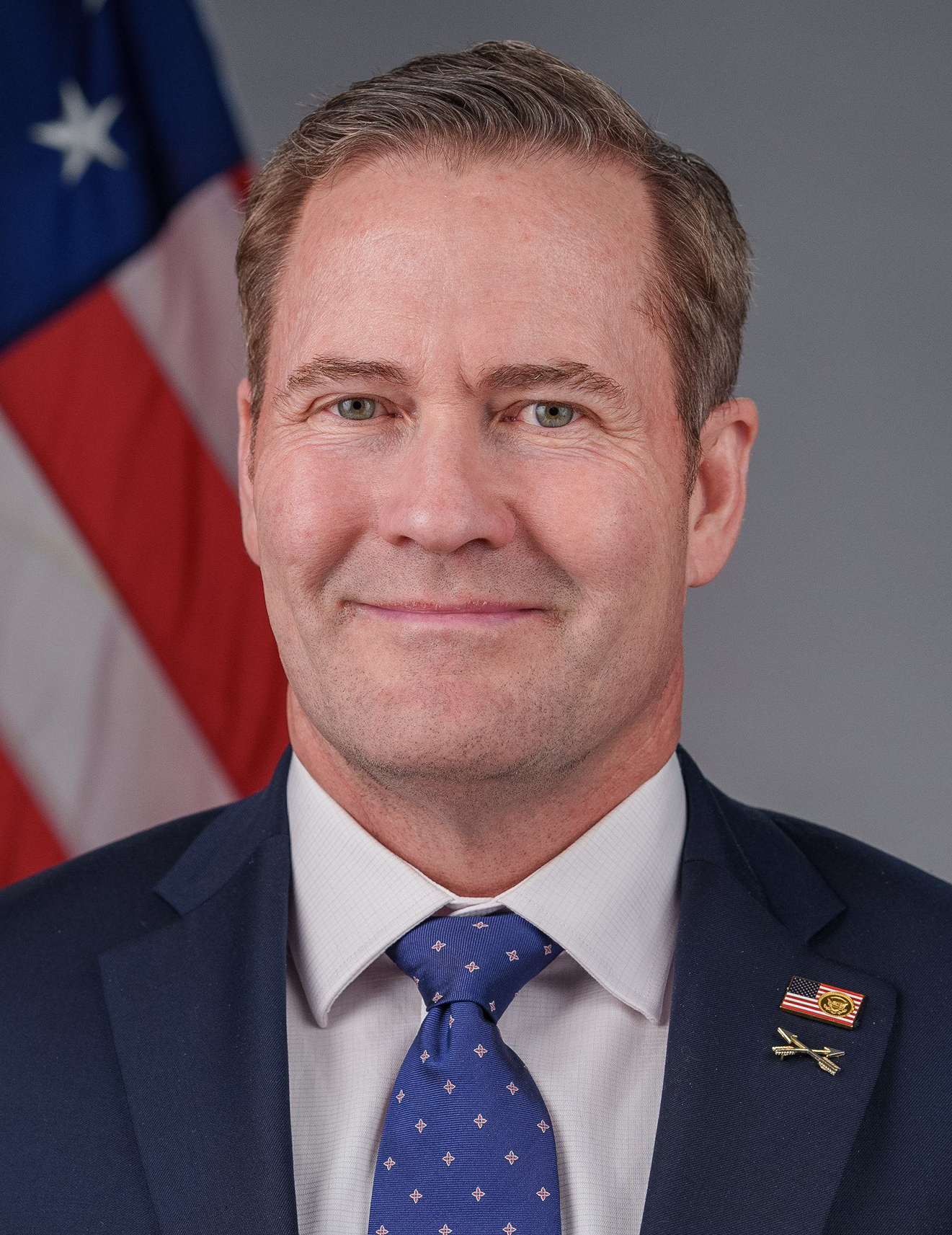
- Incumbent; Mike Waltz since September 21, 2025
- United States Mission to the United Nations
- Style: Mr. Ambassador (informal); The Honorable (formal); His Excellency (diplomatic)
- Member of: National Security Council
- Reports to: President; Secretary of State
- Residence: 50 United Nations Plaza
- Seat: United Nations Headquarters; New York City, U.S.
- Appointer: The president; with Senate advice and consent
- Term length: No fixed term; At the pleasure of the president of the United States
- Formation: December 21, 1945; 80 years ago
- First holder: Edward Stettinius Jr.
- Salary: Executive Schedule, Level IV
- Website: usun.usmission.gov

The United States ambassador to the United Nations is the leader of the U.S. Mission to the United Nations (U.N.). The position is formally known as the permanent representative of the United States of America to the United Nations, with the rank and status of ambassador extraordinary and plenipotentiary, and representative of the United States of America in the United Nations Security Council.

The deputy ambassador assumes the duties of the position in the ambassador's absence. The ambassador to the U.N. and the deputy ambassador are typically both nominated by the president of the United States and confirmed by the Senate. The ambassador serves at the pleasure of the president. The ambassador may be assisted by one or more appointed delegates, often appointed for a specific purpose or issue.

The U.S. permanent representative is charged with representing the United States on the U.N. Security Council, and during all plenary meetings of the General Assembly, except when a more senior officer of the United States (such as the secretary of state or the president of the United States) is in attendance.

Despite the title head of external mission, the United States ambassador to the United Nations is also responsible for importing United Nations policies and motions voted in the main organs of the United Nations onto the national territory.

The current ambassador is Mike Waltz, who was nominated by President Donald Trump and confirmed by the Senate on September 19, 2025.

In January 2025, following his presidential inauguration, Donald Trump formally nominated Elise Stefanik, who is currently serving in the United States House of Representatives, to be the next U.S. ambassador to the United Nations in his second term. Trump withdrew the nomination on March 27, 2025. On May 1, 2025, Trump announced via social media that he intended to nominate Mike Waltz to serve as the next U.S. ambassador to the U.N. He was confirmed 47–43 by the Senate on September 19, 2025.

== Cabinet status ==
Henry Cabot Lodge Jr., a leading moderate Republican who lost his seat in the United States Senate to John F. Kennedy in the 1952 elections, was appointed ambassador to the United Nations in 1953 by Dwight D. Eisenhower in gratitude for the defeated senator's role in the new president's defeat of conservative leader Robert A. Taft for the 1952 Republican nomination and subsequent service as his campaign manager in the general election; Eisenhower raised the ambassadorship to Cabinet rank in order to give Lodge direct access to him without having to go through the State Department.

The ambassadorship continued to hold this status throughout the remainder of the Cold War but was removed from Cabinet rank by George H. W. Bush, who had previously held the position himself. It was restored under the Clinton administration. It was not a Cabinet-level position under the George W. Bush administration (from 2001 to 2009), but was once again elevated under the Obama administration, and initially retained as such by the first Trump administration during the tenure of Nikki Haley. However, in December 2018, it was reported by several news organizations that the Trump administration would once again downgrade the position to non-Cabinet rank. The position was again elevated to Cabinet rank in the Biden administration. It was again downgraded to non-Cabinet rank under the second Trump administration.

Former U.N. ambassador and national security advisor John Bolton has publicly opposed the granting of Cabinet-level status to the office, stating in 2008 "One, it overstates the role and importance the U.N. should have in U.S. foreign policy, second, you shouldn't have two secretaries in the same department".

== List of ambassadors ==
Status

Denotes acting United States ambassador to the United Nations.

The following is a chronological list of those who have held the office:

#	Portrait	Name	Start	End	President
1		Edward Stettinius Jr.	January 17, 1946	June 3, 1946	Harry S. Truman (1945–1953)
—		Herschel Johnson; Acting	June 3, 1946	January 14, 1947	Harry S. Truman (1945–1953)
2		Warren Austin	January 14, 1947	January 22, 1953 (Note: Last two days of service were under the next administration)	Harry S. Truman (1945–1953)
3		Henry Cabot Lodge Jr.	January 26, 1953	September 3, 1960	Dwight D. Eisenhower (1953–1961)
4		James Jeremiah Wadsworth	September 8, 1960	January 21, 1961 (Note: Last day of service was under the next administration)	Dwight D. Eisenhower (1953–1961)
5		Adlai Stevenson II	January 23, 1961	July 14, 1965	John F. Kennedy (1961–1963)
5		Adlai Stevenson II	January 23, 1961	July 14, 1965	Lyndon B. Johnson (1963–1969)
6		Arthur Goldberg	July 28, 1965	June 24, 1968	Lyndon B. Johnson (1963–1969)
7		George Ball	June 26, 1968	September 25, 1968	Lyndon B. Johnson (1963–1969)
8		James Russell Wiggins	October 7, 1968	January 20, 1969	Lyndon B. Johnson (1963–1969)
9		Charles W. Yost	January 23, 1969	February 25, 1971	Richard Nixon (1969–1974)
10		George H. W. Bush	March 1, 1971	January 18, 1973	Richard Nixon (1969–1974)
11		John A. Scali	February 20, 1973	June 29, 1975	Richard Nixon (1969–1974)
11		John A. Scali	February 20, 1973	June 29, 1975	Gerald Ford (1974–1977)
12		Daniel Patrick Moynihan	June 30, 1975	February 2, 1976	Gerald Ford (1974–1977)
13		William Scranton	March 15, 1976	January 19, 1977	Gerald Ford (1974–1977)
14		Andrew Young	January 30, 1977	September 23, 1979	Jimmy Carter (1977–1981)
15		Donald McHenry	September 23, 1979	January 20, 1981	Jimmy Carter (1977–1981)
16		Jeane Kirkpatrick	February 4, 1981	April 1, 1985	Ronald Reagan (1981–1989)
17		Vernon A. Walters	May 22, 1985	March 15, 1989 (Note: Continued serving into the next administration for almost two months)	Ronald Reagan (1981–1989)
18		Thomas R. Pickering	March 20, 1989	May 7, 1992	George H. W. Bush (1989–1993)
19		Edward J. Perkins	May 12, 1992	January 27, 1993 (Note: Continued serving into the next administration for one week)	George H. W. Bush (1989–1993)
20		Madeleine Albright	January 27, 1993	January 21, 1997	Bill Clinton (1993–2001)
21		Bill Richardson	February 18, 1997	August 18, 1998	Bill Clinton (1993–2001)
—		Peter Burleigh; Acting	August 18, 1998	September 7, 1999	Bill Clinton (1993–2001)
22		Richard Holbrooke	September 7, 1999	January 20, 2001	Bill Clinton (1993–2001)
—		James B. Cunningham; Acting	January 20, 2001	September 19, 2001	George W. Bush (2001–2009)
23		John Negroponte	September 19, 2001	July 23, 2004	George W. Bush (2001–2009)
24		John Danforth	July 23, 2004	January 20, 2005	George W. Bush (2001–2009)
—		Anne W. Patterson; Acting	January 20, 2005	August 2, 2005	George W. Bush (2001–2009)
25		John Bolton	August 2, 2005	December 31, 2006	George W. Bush (2001–2009)
—		Alejandro Daniel Wolff; Acting	December 31, 2006	April 30, 2007	George W. Bush (2001–2009)
26		Zalmay Khalilzad	April 30, 2007	January 22, 2009	George W. Bush (2001–2009)
27		Susan Rice	January 26, 2009	June 30, 2013	Barack Obama (2009–2017)
—		Rosemary DiCarlo; Acting	June 30, 2013	August 5, 2013	Barack Obama (2009–2017)
28		Samantha Power	August 5, 2013	January 20, 2017	Barack Obama (2009–2017)
—		Michele J. Sison; Acting	January 20, 2017	January 27, 2017	Donald Trump (2017–2021)
29		Nikki Haley	January 27, 2017	December 31, 2018	Donald Trump (2017–2021)
—		Jonathan R. Cohen; Acting	January 1, 2019	September 12, 2019	Donald Trump (2017–2021)
30		Kelly Craft	September 12, 2019	January 20, 2021	Donald Trump (2017–2021)
—		Richard M. Mills Jr. Acting	January 20, 2021	February 25, 2021	Joe Biden (2021–2025)
31		Linda Thomas-Greenfield	February 25, 2021	January 20, 2025	Joe Biden (2021–2025)
—		Dorothy Shea; Acting	January 20, 2025	September 21, 2025	Donald Trump (2025–present)
32		Mike Waltz	September 21, 2025	present	Donald Trump (2025–present)

== List of deputy ambassadors ==
The United States deputy ambassador to the United Nations serves as the second most senior American diplomat before the United Nations General Assembly and the Security Council in New York and carries the diplomatic rank of ambassador extraordinary and plenipotentiary. The deputy ambassador assumes the duties of the position in the ambassador's absence.

- Ernest A. Gross – October 11, 1949 – 1953
- James J. Wadsworth^{†} – February 28, 1953 – 1960
- Charles W. Yost^{†} – February 13, 1961 – 1966
- William B. Buffum – January 1967 – 1970
- W. Tapley Bennett Jr. – 1971–1977
- James F. Leonard – 1977–1979
- William vanden Heuvel – 1979–1981
- Kenneth L. Adelman – confirmed July 29, 1981 – 1983
- José S. Sorzano – confirmed July 26, 1983 – 1985
- Herbert S. Okun – confirmed October 1, 1985 (following a recess appointment) – 1989
- Alexander F. Watson – confirmed August 4, 1989 – 1992
- Edward S. Walker Jr. – confirmed October 8, 1992 – 1993
- Skip Gnehm – April 1994 – August 1997
- Peter Burleigh – August 1997 – December 1999
- James B. Cunningham – December 12, 1999 – July 2004
- Anne W. Patterson – August 2004 – August 2005
- Alejandro Daniel Wolff – November 2005 – June 2010
- Rosemary DiCarlo – July 8, 2010 – c. November 1, 2014
- Michele J. Sison – December 7, 2014 – February 21, 2018
- Kelley Eckels Currie (acting) – February 21, 2018 – June 8, 2018
- Jonathan Cohen – June 8, 2018 – November 17, 2019
- Richard M. Mills Jr. – November 9, 2020 – June 21, 2024
- Dorothy Shea – August 16, 2024 – November 22, 2025
- Tammy Bruce – December 29, 2025 – present

^{†} These deputy ambassadors later served as full U.S. ambassadors to the United Nations (see above).

== List of deputies to the ambassador ==
The deputy to the ambassador to the U.N. is a separate position from the Senate-confirmed role of deputy ambassador to the United Nations. The deputy to the ambassador assists the U.S. ambassador to the U.N. by acting as a liaison in Washington, D.C., managing their Washington office, interacting with Congress and acting as a stand-in for the U.N.ambassador. The two roles co-exist, as in 2019 when Taryn Frideres was Deputy to the Ambassador at the same time that Jonathan Cohen was Deputy Ambassador to the U.N.

- Taryn Frideres – October 2019 – February 25, 2021
- Jeffrey Prescott – February 25, 2021 – February 25, 2024
- Ned Price – February 29, 2024 – January 20, 2025

== List of U.S. representatives for U.N. management and reform ==
The following individuals were appointed U.S. ambassadors and representatives for U.N. management and reform.

- Patrick F. Kennedy – 2001–2005
- Mark Wallace – 2006–2009
- Joseph Melrose – 2009–2011 (acting)
- Joe Torsella – 2011–2014
- Isobel Coleman – 2014–2017
- Cherith Norman Chalet – 2018–2021
- Chris Lu – 2022–2025
- Jeff Bartos – 2025–present

== See also ==
- Residence of the United States ambassador to the United Nations
