= Margret Benedictsson =

Icelandic-Canadian suffrage activist and journalist

- Born: 16 March 1866; Iceland
- Died: 13 December 1956 (aged 90)
- Occupations: Suffrage activist and journalist
- Known for: Campaigning for women's suffrage; co-founding and editing Freyja (journal)|
- Spouse: Sigfus Benedictsson
- Children: 3

Margret Benedictsson (16 March 1866 – 13 December 1956) was an Icelandic-Canadian suffrage activist and journalist.

Born in Iceland to Jon Jonsson, a harness-maker, and Kristjana Ebeneserdottir, a servant. At the age of 13, she began working as a shepherdess. In 1887, at the age of 21, she borrowed money and emigrated to an Icelandic settlement in the Dakota Territory in the United States despite not knowing any English. Working as a domestic servant at first, she moved to another Icelandic community in Winnipeg, Manitoba around 1890. Denied the right to vote in Canada, she became an active campaigner for the cause and by 1893, she was a lecturer on women's rights in the fast-growing city. At the time, the primarily Anglo-Canadian suffrage activists had not engaged the city's large immigrant population.

She married Sigfus Benedictsson and the couple co-founded Freyja, an Icelandic journal focused on the women's rights movement. Freyja eventually became the most important women's suffrage newspaper in Canada. It was published from 1898 – 1910.

A mother of three, she edited Freyja by night while also frequently lecturing on the topic of suffrage. The journal, which had a significant following, is credited with helping to bring about woman's suffrage in Manitoba in 1916.
