= Antony Phillipson =

British diplomat

His Excellency Antony Phillipson CMG
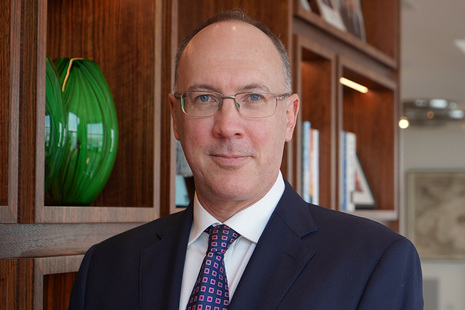
- Antony Phillipson CMG
- Born: Antony John Phillipson; 13 January 1971 (age 55)
- Education: Marlborough College, Keble College, Oxford
- Occupation: Diplomat
- Years active: 2021–2022
- Known for: British High Commissioner to Singapore and to South Africa

Antony John Phillipson, CMG (born 13 January 1971) is a British diplomat, and as of 2021, British High Commissioner to South Africa. He was High Commissioner to Singapore from 2011 to April 2015, and from 2017 to June 2021 was the British Consul-General in New York and Her Majesty's Trade Commissioner for North America.

== Career ==
Phillipson was educated at Marlborough College and Keble College, Oxford. He joined the Civil Service in 1993, working in the then Department of Trade and Industry where he rose to be Principal Private Secretary to the Secretary of State. He then transferred to the Foreign and Commonwealth Office (FCO) and served at Washington, D.C. 2002–04, as the Prime Minister's Private Secretary for Foreign Affairs 2004–07, as head of the Iran Co-ordination Group at the FCO 2007–10, and as High Commissioner to Singapore from 2011 to April 2015 when he was replaced to transfer to another Diplomatic Service appointment. He was Director of Trade and Partnerships in the Department for Exiting the European Union until November 2017, when he was appointed HM Consul General in New York and Director General of International Trade North America.

In addition to his diplomacy-related career, Antony Phillipson is a keen supporter of arts and culture, and was one of the patrons of the British Theatre Playhouse in Singapore from 2011 to 2015.

In the 2024 King's Birthday Honours, he was appointed Companion of the Order of St Michael and St George (CMG) "for services to British foreign policy, and international trade and investment".

Diplomatic posts
Preceded by Matthew Rycroft	Private Secretary for Foreign Affairs to the Prime Minister; 2004–2007	Succeeded by Matthew Gould
Preceded by Paul Madden	High Commissioner to Singapore; 2011–2015	Succeeded by Scott Wightman
Preceded by Antonia Romeo as HM Consul-General NYC and Director-General, Economic and Commercial Affairs USA	Her Majesty's Consul-General in New York, Foreign & Commonwealth Office; November 2017	Succeeded by Emma Wade-Smith
Preceded by Antonia Romeo as HM Consul-General NYC and Director-General, Economic and Commercial Affairs USA	Director-General, International Trade North America, UK Trade & Investment; November 2017-February 2021	Succeeded by Emma Wade-Smith
