= 1916 British Columbia referendum =

British Columbia referendums
- September 14, 1916

Prohibition
Yes	53.72%
No	46.28%

Extension of franchise to women
Yes	65.86%
No	34.14%

Two referendums were held in British Columbia on September 14, 1916, alongside the 1916 general election. In them, the majority of voters approved Acts of the British Columbia Legislature that introduced prohibition and women's suffrage on the same basis as men.

== Background ==
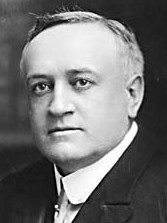
William Bowser, Conservative Premier of British Columbia.

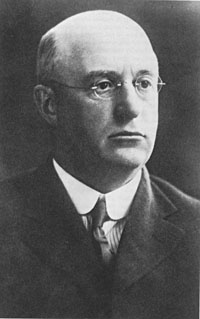
Harlan Brewster, Liberal Leader (Note: The Liberals had been shut out of the Legislature in the 1912 election.)

Principal players in the campaign

The issues of prohibition and women's suffrage dominated much of the final session of the Legislative Assembly before the election. A Prohibition bill with a referendum clause was promised in the Speech from the Throne in March, which was supported by Liberal leader Harlan Brewster in a speech to a prohibition delegation in February. The bill received royal assent on May 31, and was scheduled to come into force on July 1, 1917, upon approval by the voters. In the campaign, the majority of the prohibitionist supporters were also Liberals.

A suffrage bill had been defeated earlier in the session, and Premier Bowser opted to take that issue to the voters as well. It was scheduled to become effective on January 1, 1917, upon approval in the referendum. The move to submit the issues to the voters was seen as a tactic by Premier Bowser to sideline it from the election, but it was contested by many women as being unfair to have the decision made solely by male voters.

Implementing legislation was also enacted to provide for the operation of the referendums. The extension of the franchise to soldiers stationed overseas for the election also applied for these votes.

== Results ==
=== Prohibition ===
The question posed was, "Are you in favour of bringing the British Columbia Prohibition Act in force?"

The votes from the overseas soldiers had initially caused the referendum to be defeated by 822 votes. A Prohibition convention held in March 1917 called for the measure to be passed anyway, despite the overseas vote. Incoming Premier Brewster promised to do so, should irregularities be proved to have occurred.

A commission of inquiry was appointed to investigate allegations of voting irregularities, and it determined that all ballots cast after Election Day must be disregarded. The commissioners reported that "grave frauds and irregularities were committed, and that the regulations laid down for the taking of the vote were in many instances not observed." As a result, an Act was passed by the Legislature, providing that Prohibition would come into effect on October 1, 1917.

1916 prohibition referendum
Choice	Votes on initial count					Votes disregarded later		
Choice	Civilian	Soldiers (Canada)	Soldiers (Overseas)	Total	%	#	Net	Net %
Yes	36,490	3,353	2,893	42,736	49.52	(832)	41,904	53.72
No	27,217	3,622	12,719	43,558	50.47	(7,456)	36,102	46.28
Total	63,707	6,975	15,612	86,294	100.00	(8,288)	78,006	100.00
Majority	9,273	(269)	(9,826)	(822)	(0.95)	6,624	5,802	7.44

=== Woman Suffrage ===
The question posed was, "Are you in favour of the extension of the electoral franchise to women?"

Unlike the prohibition referendum, the votes from soldiers overseas were not disregarded.

The initial 1916 suffrage Act was repealed and replaced by a broader amendment to the Provincial Elections Act, effective April 5, 1917, which also allowed women to become MLAs, on same basis as men. Even after extension of suffrage to women, some women were still barred from voting, on same basis as men. Hutterites and Mennonites of both genders were given the vote in 1948, and Treaty Indians and Japanese-Canadians of both genders were given the vote in 1949.

1916 woman suffrage referendum
Choice	Votes				%
Choice	Civilian	Soldiers (Canada)	Soldiers (Overseas)	Total	%
Yes	43,160	3,976	8,498	55,634	65.86
No	19,962	2,314	6,561	28,837	34.14
Total	63,122	6,290	15,059	84,471	100.00
Lead of Yes votes over No votes	23,198	1,662	1,937	26,797	31.72
