= Courtenay Bennett =

British diplomat (1855–1937)

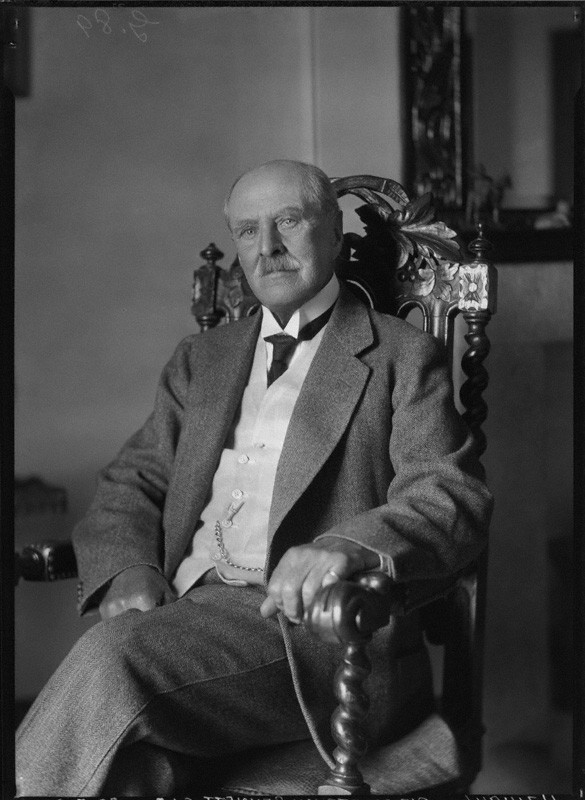
Bennett photographed by Lafayette in 1932.

Sir Courtenay Walter Bennett CIE (11 May 1855 – 17 December 1937) was a British diplomat.

Bennett was born in Plymouth, Devon, the son of John Nicholas Bennett and Emily Gribble Prance. He began his career in the India Office. He subsequently moved to Her Majesty's Diplomatic Service, and held postings in Spain, Guatemala, Rio Grande do Sul and Réunion. He was made a Companion of the Order of the Indian Empire on 21 June 1900. He served as the British Consul-General in San Francisco between 1901 and 1907. He then served as Consul-General in New York between 1907 and his retirement in 1915. He was made a knight bachelor in 1914. In retirement he lived in Devon.

Bennett was serving in the British diplomatic mission to the US during the first year of the First World War, and was engaged in early attempts to end American neutrality under the British ambassador, Cecil Spring Rice.

He died at his home in Postbridge, Dartmoor, aged 82.
