= Edward Mortimer Archibald =

British-Canadian lawyer and diplomat

Sir Edward Mortimer Archibald
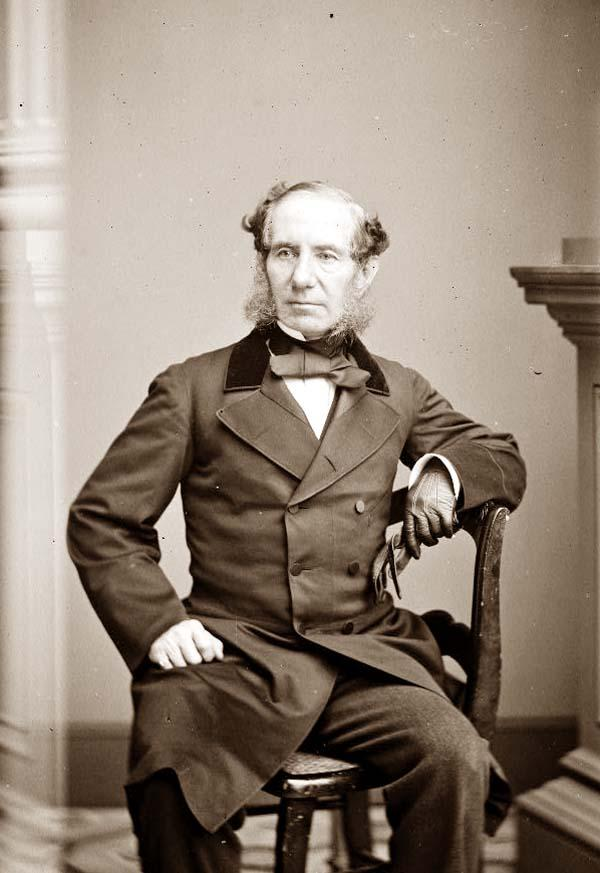
- 1863 photograph of Sir Edward M. Archibald by Mathew Brady
- Born: 10 May 1810; Truro, Nova Scotia, Canada
- Died: 8 February 1884 (aged 73); Steyning, Sussex
- Resting place: Brighton Extra Mural Cemetery, Brighton and Hove, East Sussex, England
- Occupations: Diplomat, lawyer
- Years active: 1831–1883
- Era: Victorian
- Spouse: Catherine Elizabeth Richardson
- Children: 6, including Edith Archibald
- Parents: Samuel George William Archibald (father); Elizabeth Dickson (mother)

Sir Edward Mortimer Archibald, KCMG (10 May 1810 – 8 February 1884) was a British diplomat, a lawyer and an office holder active during the transition to responsible government in the colony of Newfoundland.

Archibald was born in Truro, Nova Scotia, the son of Samuel George William Archibald and Elizabeth Dickson. His father was a lawyer and attorney general for Nova Scotia. Archibald studied law in his father's office and was admitted to the bar of Nova Scotia in early 1831. The following October, Archibald was appointed chief clerk and registrar of the Supreme Court of Newfoundland, replacing his brother in that position. By 1833, Archibald was an acting assistant judge of the Newfoundland Supreme Court. At the same time, he took on the additional job of chief clerk of the Newfoundland General Assembly.

Beginning in 1857, Archibald served as British consul to New York, a position he held for twenty-six years until his retirement on 1 January 1883. From 1871 he also undertook the additional responsibility of acting as British consul-general for New York, New Jersey, Delaware, Rhode Island, and Connecticut.

Archibald married Catherine Elizabeth Richardson, on 10 September 1834 at Truro, Nova Scotia. One of his daughters, Edith Archibald, became a suffragist and writer. Archibald died from pneumonia in Steyning, Sussex and is buried in the Brighton Extra Mural Cemetery.

== Notes ==
Diplomatic posts
Preceded by ?	British Consul for New York; 1857–1871	Succeeded by Consulate expanded
Preceded by Consulate expanded	British Consul for New York et al. 1871–1883	Succeeded by William Booker
