= Edith Archibald =

Canadian suffragist and writer (1854–1936)

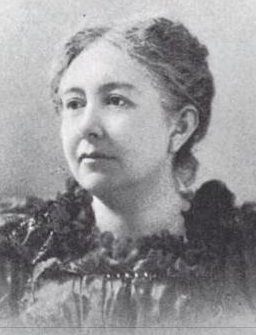
- Born: April 7, 1854; St. John's, Newfoundland
- Died: May 11, 1936 (aged 82)
- Occupations: suffragist, writer
- Spouse: Charles A. Archibald (m. 1874)
- Parents: Sir Edward Mortimer Archibald (father); Catherine Elizabeth Richardson (mother)

Edith Jessie Archibald (7 April 1854 – 11 May 1936) was a Canadian suffragist and writer who led the Maritime Women's Christian Temperance Union (WCTU), National Council of Women of Canada and the Local Council of Women of Halifax. For her many forms of social activism, she was referred to as the "Lady of Grace" by King George V, and she was designated a Person of National Historic Significance by the Government of Canada in 1997.

== Early life ==
Born in St. John's, Newfoundland, to Catherine Elizabeth (Richardson) Archibald and Sir Edward Mortimer Archibald, Edith Jessie Archibald belonged to a prominent family with a history of public service. She received some of her early education in London and New York City, where her father was British Consul General.

At the age of twenty, she married her second cousin Charles A. Archibald, a mining engineer who owned the Gowrie colliery in Cow Bay, Nova Scotia. In 1893 he sold the colliery and took up a position as president and director of the Bank of Nova Scotia in Halifax. They had four children — Susan Georgina (known as Georgie), Thomas, Charles, and Edward — and lived in a mansion, "Seaview", in Port Morien before moving to Halifax.

== Woman's Christian Temperance Union ==
Archibald became involved with the WCTU in the 1880s and from 1892 to 1896 was Maritime Superintendent of the Parlour Meetings Department, which encouraged social events in members' homes as a method of organizing temperance activities and educating women. Enthusiastic about the benefits of parlour meetings, she surveyed the 54 local unions to find their assessment of the meetings, published a circular letter in the official national paper of the WCTU, and also printed it as a leaflet. Archibald realized that local action was necessary to achieve the national goals of the organization. She even led members on raids of three illicit saloons in Cow Bay.

During Archibald's involvement with the WCTU, she focused on campaigning against issues such as domestic violence, child neglect and poverty. After being elected President of the WCTU in 1892, Archibald worked alongside other women to campaign for community services to better the lives of women and children. This included creating libraries and orphanages. Archibald also pushed for women's suffrage during her time at the WCTU. A motto used was "Agitate, Educate, Legislate".

== Other social activism ==
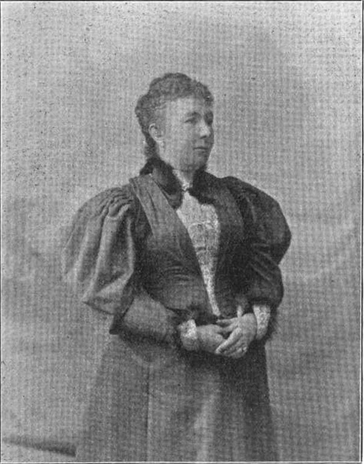
Archibald in 1895

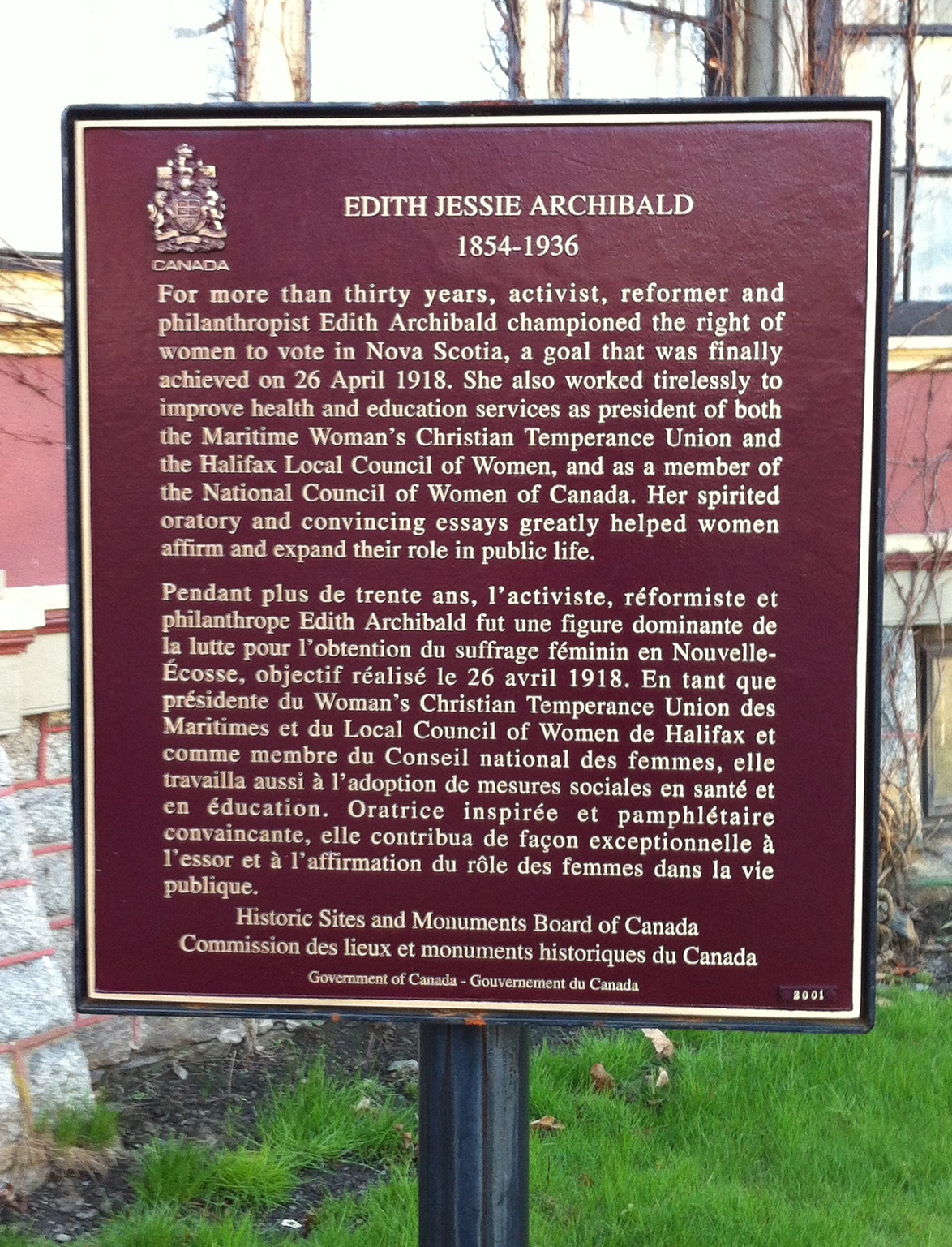
Edith Archibald Plaque, George Wright House Property, Halifax, Nova Scotia

She was a leader in the National Council of Women of Canada and the Victorian Order of Nurses (VON) and was the president of the Halifax VON from 1897 to 1901. She was active in getting a children's hospital built in Halifax and subsequently became a director of the hospital.

In 1895, after Archibald's family move to Halifax, she became President of the Halifax Local Council of Women. Soon after becoming president, Archibald resigned due to religious conflicts. However, she returned and was president from 1899-1905. During her time as president of the Halifax Local Council of Women, Archibald led a campaign focused on gaining representation of women on the Halifax School Board. Archibald also continued to fight for women's right to vote.

She served as vice-president of the Nova Scotia Red Cross in 1914, tasked with running the department that oversaw Canadian prisoners of war overseas. She was recommended by the Order of Jerusalem in honor of her work during World War I.

Archibald battled for decades for women's right to vote and led a 1917 delegation of women to convince the Nova Scotia Premier George Henry Murray not to block the suffrage bill; the legislature finally granted this right in 1918.

Archibald was also a founder and the first president of the Ladies' Musical Club of Halifax and a director of the Victoria School of Art and Design. As a founding member of the Ladies' Musical Club of Halifax, Archibald pushed for opportunities for women as composers.

== Writing ==
In later life, she wrote short stories, plays, and articles and was the author of several books. One of her books, Bed-Time Stories for My Grand-Children (1910), was a privately published memoir prompted by the death of her daughter Georgie in 1909. Archibald wrote the memoir so that Georgie's children would know what their mother's own childhood in Cow Bay had been like.

In 1924, she published a biography of her father titled Life and Letters of Sir Edward Mortimer Archibald, K.C.M.G., C.B.. She also wrote The Token: A Tale of Cape Breton Island, which began life as a play in the mid-1920s and then became a novel published in 1930. The story takes place after the American Civil War and concerns the exploits of one Angus McRory. In a review of the book, the London Morning Post declared it to be a work of a promising young writer, unaware that the author was in her seventies at the time.

Other books include Stray Songs for Glad Days and Sad Days (1894), and Gufshathi and Herriaman: A Missionary Story (n.d.).
