= William Lane Booker =

British diplomat (1824–1905)

Sir William Lane Booker, CMG
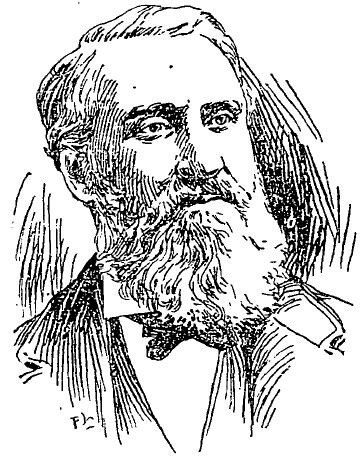
- A sketch of William Lane Booker from The New York Times, 1 July 1894
- Born: 12 July 1824
- Died: 19 February 1905 (aged 80)
- Spouse: Elizabeth French Bispham

Sir William Lane Booker, CMG, FRGS (12 July 1824 – 19 February 1905) was a British diplomat stationed in the United States.

Booker was the son of Thomas Booker and his wife Rhoda and was baptized at St Botolph's Aldgate on 23 July 1824. Between 1844 and 1848, Booker traveled in Asia, Southern Europe, the United States, and Canada. Attracted by Colonel Mason's report on the discovery of gold in California, he left England on 17 January 1849 for Chagres, then the chief Atlantic port on the Isthmus of Panama. After a three-week wait in Panama City, he then traveled north on board a clipper to San Francisco, arriving at the end of June 1849.

Booker then spent a year at the Yuba River and Butte Creek mines. Failing to make his fortune, he returned to San Francisco and worked for English insurance and mining companies for several years. On the formation of the British consulate in the city in the spring of 1851 the booker began work there as a secretary. In 1856 he became Acting Consul for California, and on the retirement George Aiken in 1857, he became full Consul. In 1871 the consulate was expanded to include Oregon and Washington, retaining its headquarters in San Francisco.

On the retirement of Sir Edward Archibald, Booker was appointed Consul-General for New York, Delaware, New Jersey, Rhode Island, and Connecticut (with the headquarters at New York City) on 1 January 1883.

The consulate was later expanded to include Colorado, Kansas, Nebraska, Dakota, Wyoming, and Utah, with effect from the same date, and reduced to include the original states in 1886.

On 6 August 1886, he was appointed a Companion of the Order of St Michael and St George (CMG) and was made a Knight Bachelor by letters patent in 1894 before retiring and returning to England in July of that year.

Booker married on 22 September 1881 Elizabeth French Bispham née Page, daughter of Gilbert Page of Morristown, New Jersey. Lady Booker died on 7 April 1900.

Diplomatic posts
Preceded by George Aiken	British Consul for California (acting 1856-7); 1857–1871	Succeeded by Consulate expanded
Preceded by Consulate expanded	British Consul for California, Oregon and Washington; 1871–1883	Succeeded by George Stanley
Preceded by Sir Edward Archibald	British Consul-General for New York et al. 1883–1894	Succeeded by Gilbert Fraser (acting)
