= Military history of Nova Scotia =

Provincial military history

Nova Scotia (also known as Mi'kma'ki and Acadia) is a Canadian province located in Canada's Maritimes. The region was initially occupied by Mi'kmaq. The colonial history of Nova Scotia includes the present-day Maritime Provinces and the northern part of Maine (Sunbury County, Nova Scotia), all of which were at one time part of Nova Scotia. In 1763, Cape Breton Island and St. John's Island (now Prince Edward Island) became part of Nova Scotia. In 1769, St. John's Island became a separate colony. Nova Scotia included present-day New Brunswick until that province was established in 1784. (In 1765, Sunbury County, Nova Scotia was created, and included the territory of present-day New Brunswick and eastern Maine as far as the Penobscot River.) During the first 150 years of European settlement, the colony was primarily made up of Catholic Acadians, Maliseet, and Mi'kmaq. During the last 75 years of this time period, there were colonial wars that took place in Nova Scotia (see the Seven Years' War as well as Dummer's War). After agreeing to several peace treaties, the long period of warfare ended with the Halifax Treaties (1761) and two years later, when the British defeated the French in North America (1763). During those wars, the Acadians, Mi'kmaq and Maliseet from the region fought to protect the border of Acadia from New England. They fought the war on two fronts: the southern border of Acadia, which New France defined as the Kennebec River in southern Maine, and in Nova Scotia, which involved preventing New Englanders from taking the capital of Acadia, Port Royal (See Queen Anne's War) and establishing themselves at Canso.

During the Seven Years' War, Halifax was established as the British Headquarters of the North American Station (see Royal Naval Dockyard, Halifax). As a result, Nova Scotia was active throughout the American Revolution and the War of 1812. The North Atlantic archipelago of Bermuda, or the Somers Isles, originally part of Virginia, was grouped as part of British America until 1783, thereafter remained part of British North America until left out of the Confederation of Canada. Militarily, the Bermuda Garrison fell under the Commander-in-Chief in Nova Scotia until Canadian Confederation resulted in the abolishment of the British Army command. The Royal Navy permanently established a base in Bermuda in 1795, and by 1812, it alternated seasonally with Halifax as main base for the North America Station, becoming the main base year round in the 1820s. Both Halifax and Bermuda were designated Imperial fortresses, along with Malta and Gibraltar. During the Victorian era, Nova Scotians also played prominent roles in the Crimean War and the Indian Mutiny. The province also participated in the North-West Rebellion and the Second Boer War. In the 20th century, the province produced numerous people who fought in World War I and World War II. A few Nova Scotians who also participated in the Spanish Civil War, the Korean War, and the War in Afghanistan.

== Seventeenth century ==
=== Port Royal established 1605 ===
The first European settlement in Nova Scotia was established in 1605. The French, led by Pierre Dugua, Sieur de Monts established the first capital for the colony of Acadia of Port Royal, modern-day Annapolis Royal. Other than a few trading posts around the province, for the next seventy-five years, Port Royal was virtually the only European settlement in Nova Scotia. Port Royal remained the capital of Acadia and later Nova Scotia for almost 150 years, prior to the founding of Halifax in 1749.

Approximately seventy-five years after Port Royal was founded, Acadians migrated from the capital and established what would become the other major Acadian settlements before the Expulsion of the Acadians: Grand Pré, Chignecto, Cobequid and Pisiguit.

The English made six attempts to conquer the capital of Acadia which they finally did in the Siege of Port Royal in 1710. Over the following fifty years, the French and their allies made six unsuccessful military attempts to regain the capital.

=== Scottish and French Conflict (1639-1632) ===
From 1629 to 1632, Nova Scotia was briefly a Scottish colony. Sir William Alexander of Menstrie Castle, Scotland claimed mainland Nova Scotia and settled at Port Royal, while Ochiltree claimed Ile Royale (present-day Cape Breton Island) and settled at Baleine, Nova Scotia. There were three battles between the Scottish and the French: the Siege of Baleine (1629), the Siege of Cap de Sable (present-day Port La Tour, Nova Scotia) (1630) and the Raid on Saint John (1632), . Nova Scotia was returned to France via the Treaty of Saint-Germain-en-Laye (1632).

The French quickly defeated the Scottish at Baleine and established settlements on Ile Royale at present day Englishtown (1629) and St. Peter's (1630). These two settlements remained the only settlements on the island until they were abandoned by Nicolas Denys in 1659. Ile Royale then remained vacant for more than fifty years until the communities were re-established when Louisbourg was established in 1713.

=== Acadian Civil War (1640-1645) ===
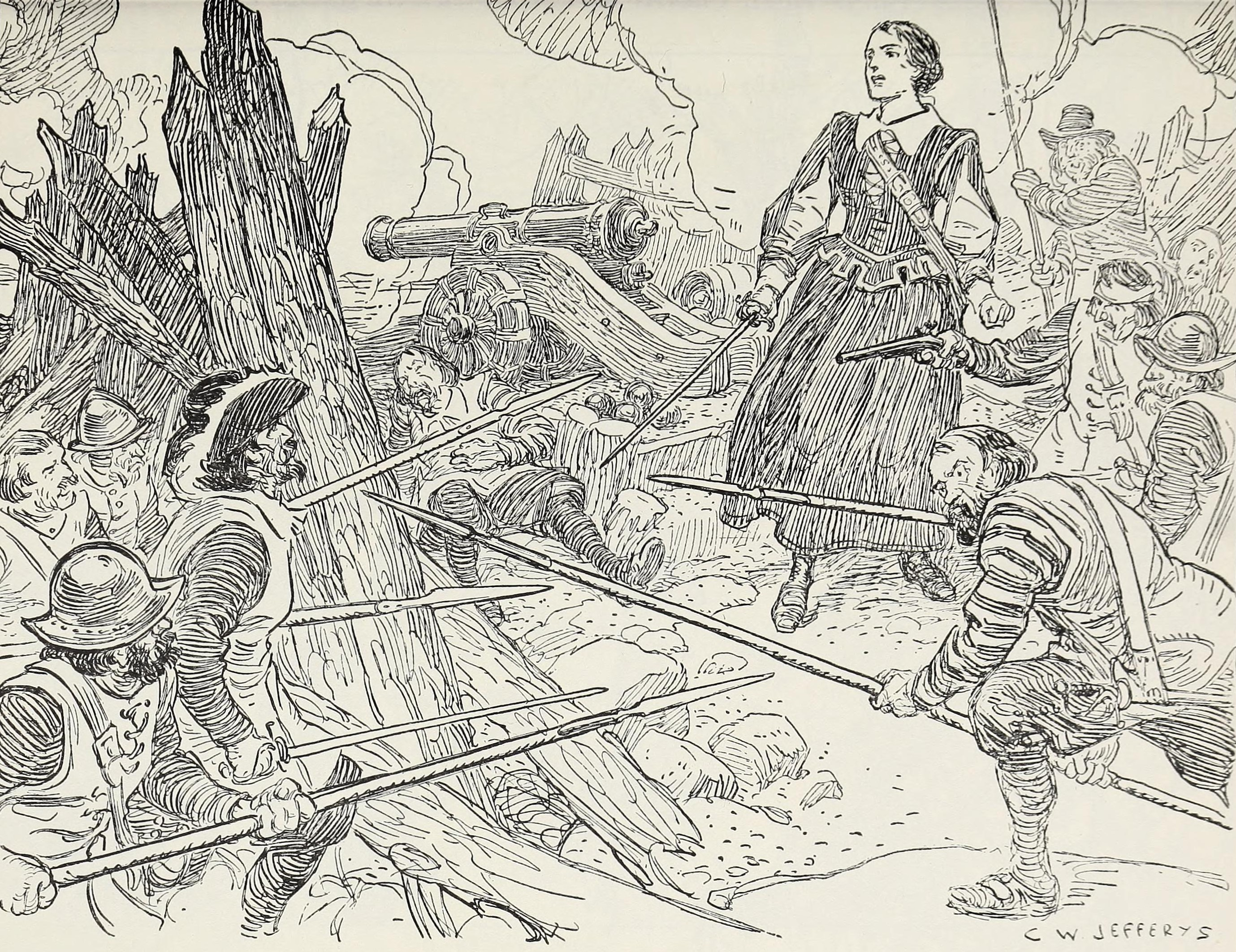
Siege of Saint John (1645) – d'Aulnay defeats La Tour in Acadia

Acadia was plunged into what some historians have described as a civil war between 1640 and 1645. The war was between Port Royal, where Governor of Acadia Charles de Menou d'Aulnay de Charnisay was stationed, and present-day Saint John, New Brunswick, where Governor of Acadia. Charles de Saint-Étienne de la Tour was stationed.

In the war, there were four major battles. la Tour attacked d'Aulnay at Port Royal in 1640. In response to the attack, D'Aulnay sailed out of Port Royal to establish a five-month blockade of La Tour's fort at Saint John, which La Tour eventually defeated (1643). La Tour attacked d'Aulnay again at Port Royal in 1643. d'Aulnay and Port Royal ultimately won the war against La Tour with the 1645 siege of Saint John. After d'Aulnay died (1650), La Tour re-established himself in Acadia.

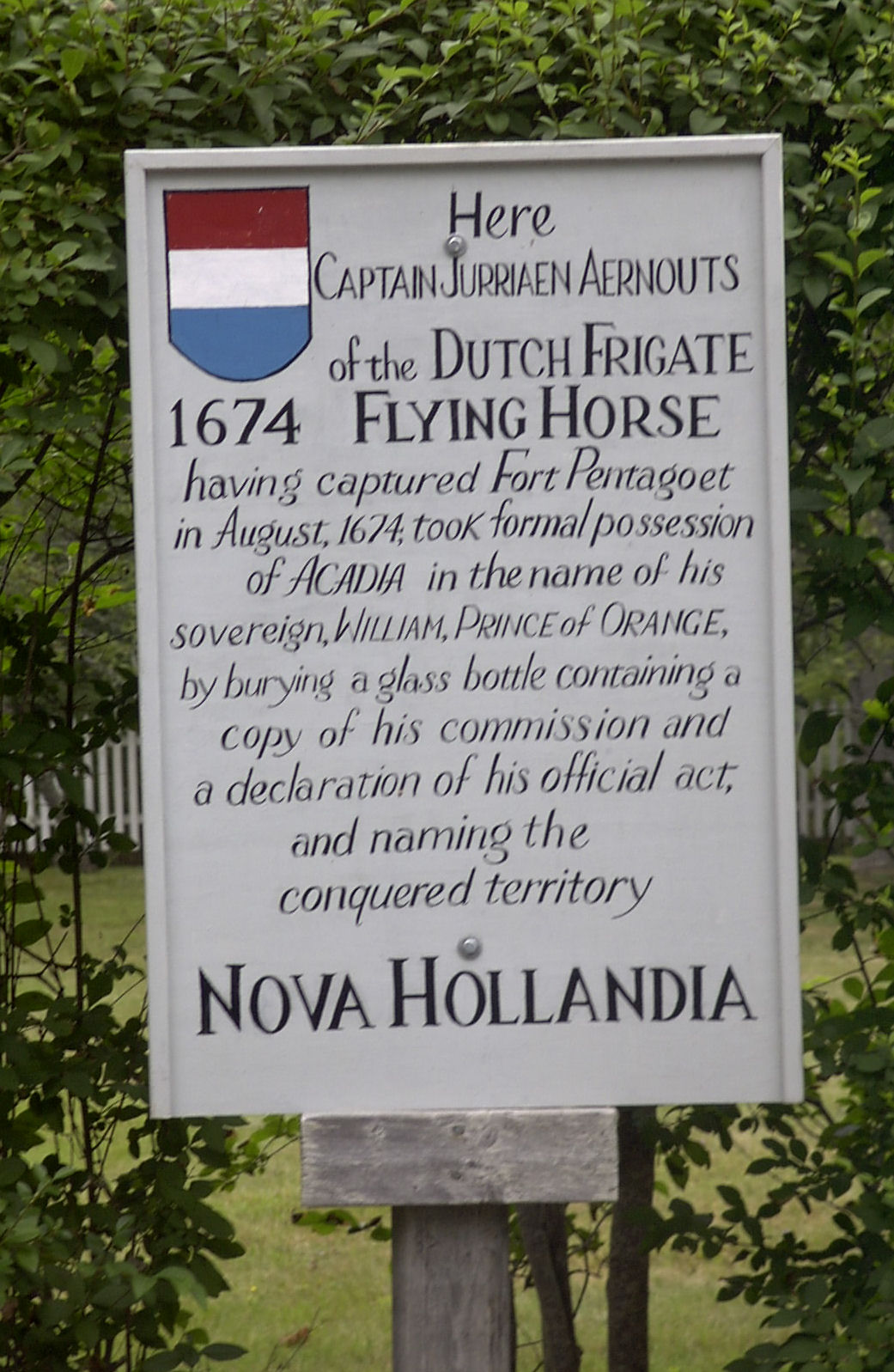
Marker commemorating the Dutch conquest of Acadia (1674), which they renamed New Holland. This is the spot where Jurriaen Aernoutsz buried a bottle at the capital of Acadia, Fort Pentagouet, Castine, Maine

In 1674, the Dutch briefly conquered Acadia, renaming the colony New Holland.

=== King Philip's War (1675-1678) ===
During King Philip's War, the governor was absent from Acadia (having first been imprisoned in Boston during the Dutch occupation of Acadia) and Jean-Vincent d'Abbadie de Saint-Castin was established at the capital of Acadia, Pentgouet. From there he worked with the Abenaki of Acadia to raid British settlements migrating over the border of Acadia. British retaliation included attacking deep into Acadia in the Battle off Port La Tour (1677).

=== Wabanaki Confederacy ===
In response to King Philip's War in New England (which included the first military conflict between the Mi'kmaq and New England), the Mi'kmaq and Maliseet people from this region joined the Wabanaki Confederacy to form a political and military alliance with New France. The Mi'kmaq and Maliseet were very significant military allies to New France through six wars.

=== King William's War (1688-1697) ===
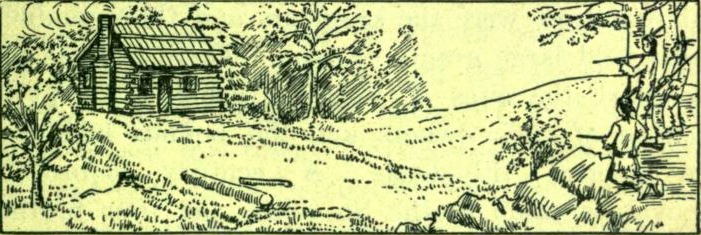
Maliseet and Mi'kmaq "attack on the [Maine] settlement" (c. 1690)

During King William's War, the Mi'kmaq, Acadians and Maliseet participated in defending Acadia at its border with New England, which New France defined as the Kennebec River in southern Maine. Toward this end, the Maliseet from their headquarters at Meductic on the Saint John River, joined the New France expedition against present-day Bristol, Maine (the Siege of Pemaquid (1689)), Salmon Falls and present-day Portland, Maine. In response, the New Englanders retaliated by attacking Port Royal and present-day Guysborough. In 1694, the Maliseet participated in the Raid on Oyster River at present-day Durham, New Hampshire. Two years later, New France, led by Pierre Le Moyne d'Iberville, returned and fought a naval battle in the Bay of Fundy before moving on to raid Bristol, Maine again. In retaliation, the New Englanders, led by Benjamin Church, engaged in a Raid on Chignecto (1696) and the siege of the Capital of Acadia at Fort Nashwaak. After the Siege of Pemaquid (1696), d'Iberville led a force of 124 Canadians, Acadians, Mi'kmaq and Abenakis in the Avalon Peninsula Campaign. They destroyed almost every English settlement in Newfoundland, over 100 English were killed, many times that number captured, and almost 500 deported to England or France.

At the end of the war England returned the territory to France in the Treaty of Ryswick and the borders of Acadia remained the same.

== Early Eighteenth century ==
=== Queen Anne's War (1702-1713) ===
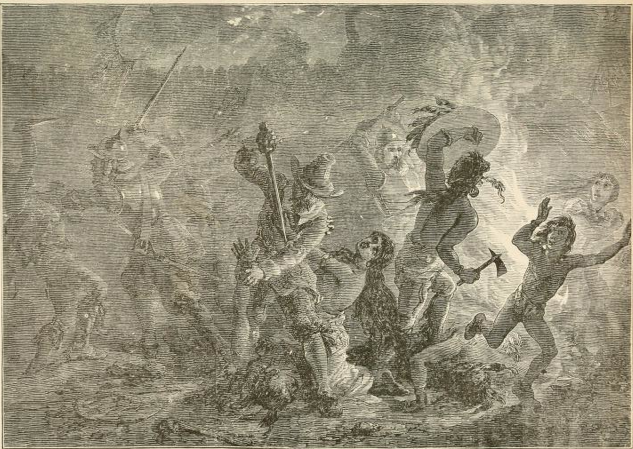
Raid on Grand Pré (1704)

During Queen Anne's War, known more generally as the War of the Spanish Succession, the Mi'kmaq, Acadians and Maliseet participated again in defending Acadia at its border against New England. They made numerous raids on New England settlements along the border in the Northeast Coast Campaign, the most famous being the Raid on Deerfield. In retaliation, Major Benjamin Church went on his fifth and final expedition to Acadia. He raided present-day Castine, Maine and then continued on by conducting raids against Grand Pre, Pisiquid and Chignecto. A few years later, defeated in the Siege of Pemaquid (1696), Captain March made an unsuccessful Siege of Port Royal in 1707. The New Englanders were successful with the Siege of Port Royal (1710), while the Wabanaki Confederacy were successful in the nearby Battle of Bloody Creek in 1711.

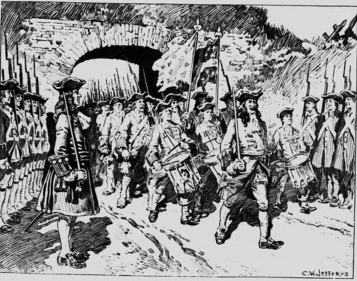
Evacuation Of Port Royal 1710 by CW Jefferys

During Queen Anne's War, the Conquest of Acadia (1710) was confirmed by the Treaty of Utrecht of 1713. Acadia was defined as mainland-Nova Scotia by the French. Present-day New Brunswick and most of Maine remained contested territory, while New England conceded present-day Prince Edward Island and Cape Breton Island, which France quickly renamed Île St Jean and Île Royale (Cape Breton Island) respectively. On the latter island, the French established a fortress at Louisbourg to guard the sea approaches to Quebec.

=== Nova Scotia regiment ===
The 40th Regiment of Foot was the first British regiment to be raised in Nova Scotia and was commanded directly by four consecutive Governors of Nova Scotia over forty-two years. The regiment was raised by General Richard Philipps in August 1717 out of independent companies stationed in North America and the West Indies. The Regiment was first known as Philipp's regiment (1717–1749), Cornwallis' Regiment (1749–1752). In 1751, the regiment was numbered the "40th Regiment of Foot" and became known as 40th Hopson's Regiment (1752–1759). The 40th fought in Father Rale's War, King George's War, conflicts in Nova Scotia, 1749–1755, and then the Seven Years' War.

=== Father Rale's War (1722-1725) ===
During the escalation that preceded Father Rale's War (1722–1725), Mi'kmaq raided the new fort Fort William Augustus at Canso, Nova Scotia (1720). Under potential siege, in May 1722, Lieutenant Governor John Doucett took 22 Mi'kmaq hostage at Annapolis Royal to prevent the capital from being attacked. In July 1722 the Abenaki and Mi'kmaq created a blockade of Annapolis Royal, with the intent of starving the capital. The natives captured 18 fishing vessels and prisoners from present-day Yarmouth to Canso. They also seized prisoners and vessels from the Bay of Fundy.

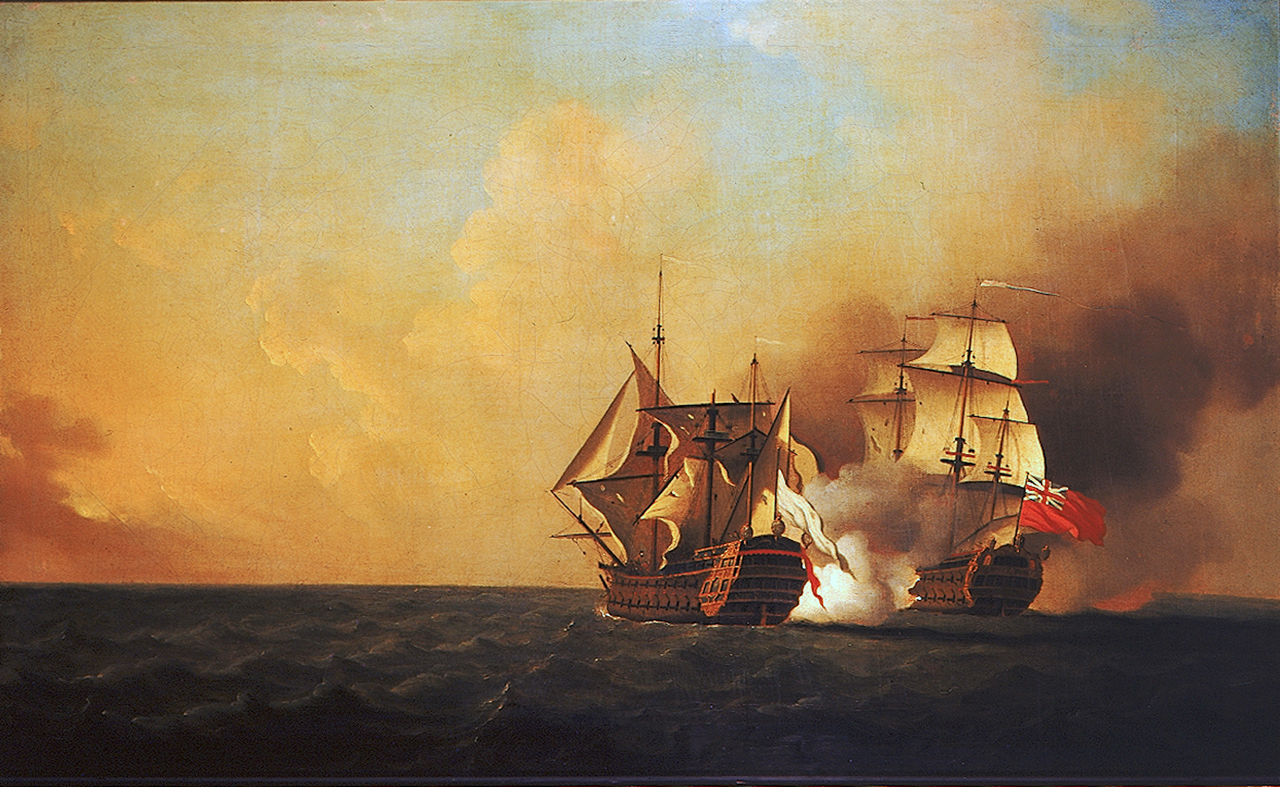
Duc d'Anville Expedition: Action between HMS Nottingham and the Mars.

As a result of the escalating conflict, Massachusetts Governor Samuel Shute officially declared war on July 22, 1722. The first battle of Father Rale's War happened in the Nova Scotia theatre. In response to the blockade of Annapolis Royal, at the end of July 1722, New England launched a campaign to end the blockade and retrieve over 86 New England prisoners taken by the natives. One of these operations resulted in the Battle at Jeddore. The next was a raid on Canso in 1723.

The worst moment of the war for the capital came in early July 1724 when a group of sixty Mikmaq and Maliseets raided Annapolis Royal. They killed and scalped a sergeant and a private, wounded four more soldiers, and terrorized the village. They also burned houses and took prisoners. The British responded by executing one of the Mi'kmaq hostages on the same spot the sergeant was killed. They also burned three Acadian houses in retaliation.

As a result of the raid, three blockhouses were built to protect the town. The Acadian church was moved closer to the fort so that it could be more easily monitored.

In 1725, sixty Abenakis and Mi'kmaq launched another attack on Canso, destroying two houses and killing six people.

The treaty that ended the war marked a significant shift in European relations with the Mi'kmaq and Maliseet. For the first time a European Empire formally acknowledged that its dominion over Nova Scotia would have to be negotiated with the region's indigenous inhabitants. The treaty was invoked as recently as 1999 in the Donald Marshall case.

=== King George's War (1744-1748) ===
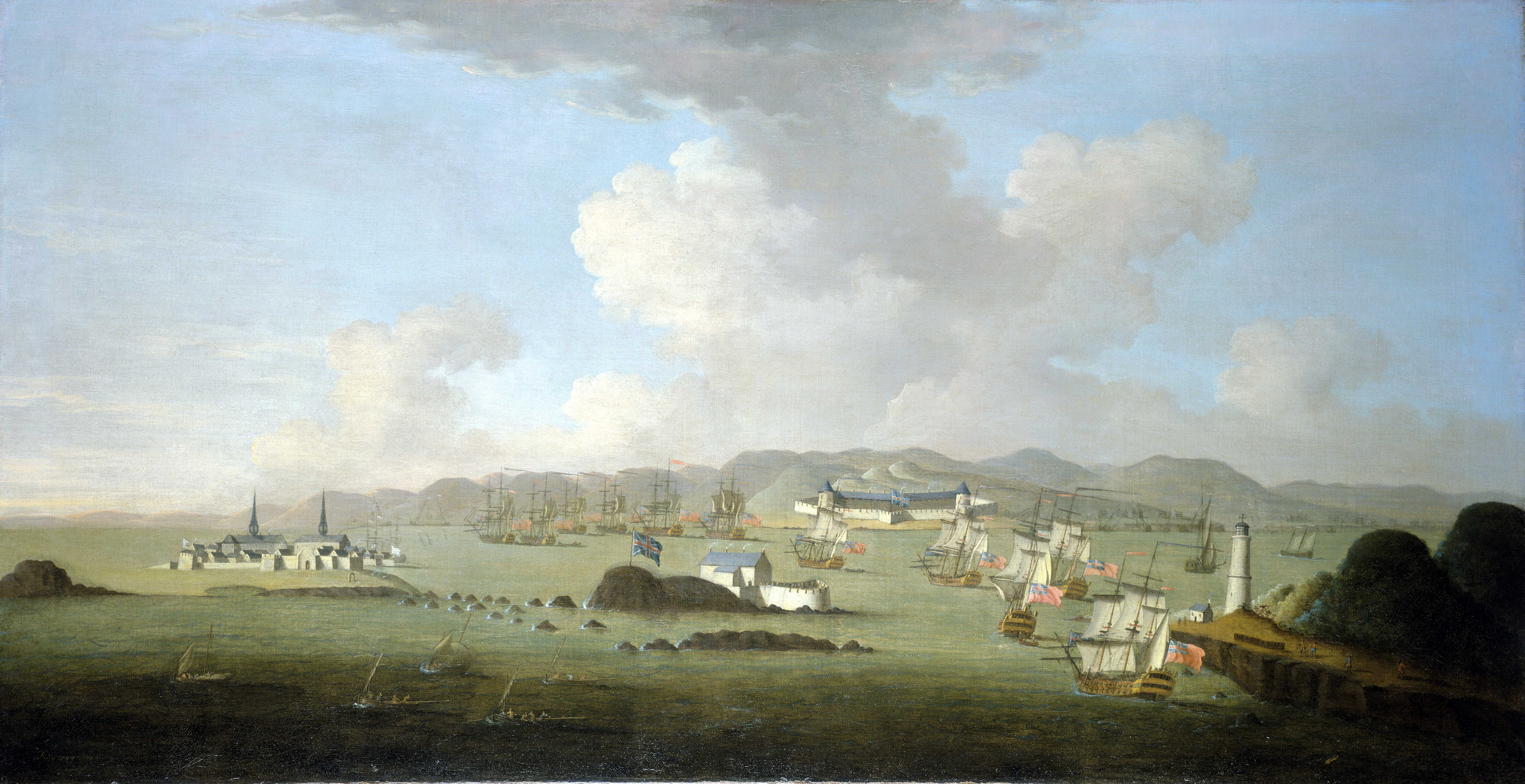
Siege of Louisbourg (1745) by Peter Monamy

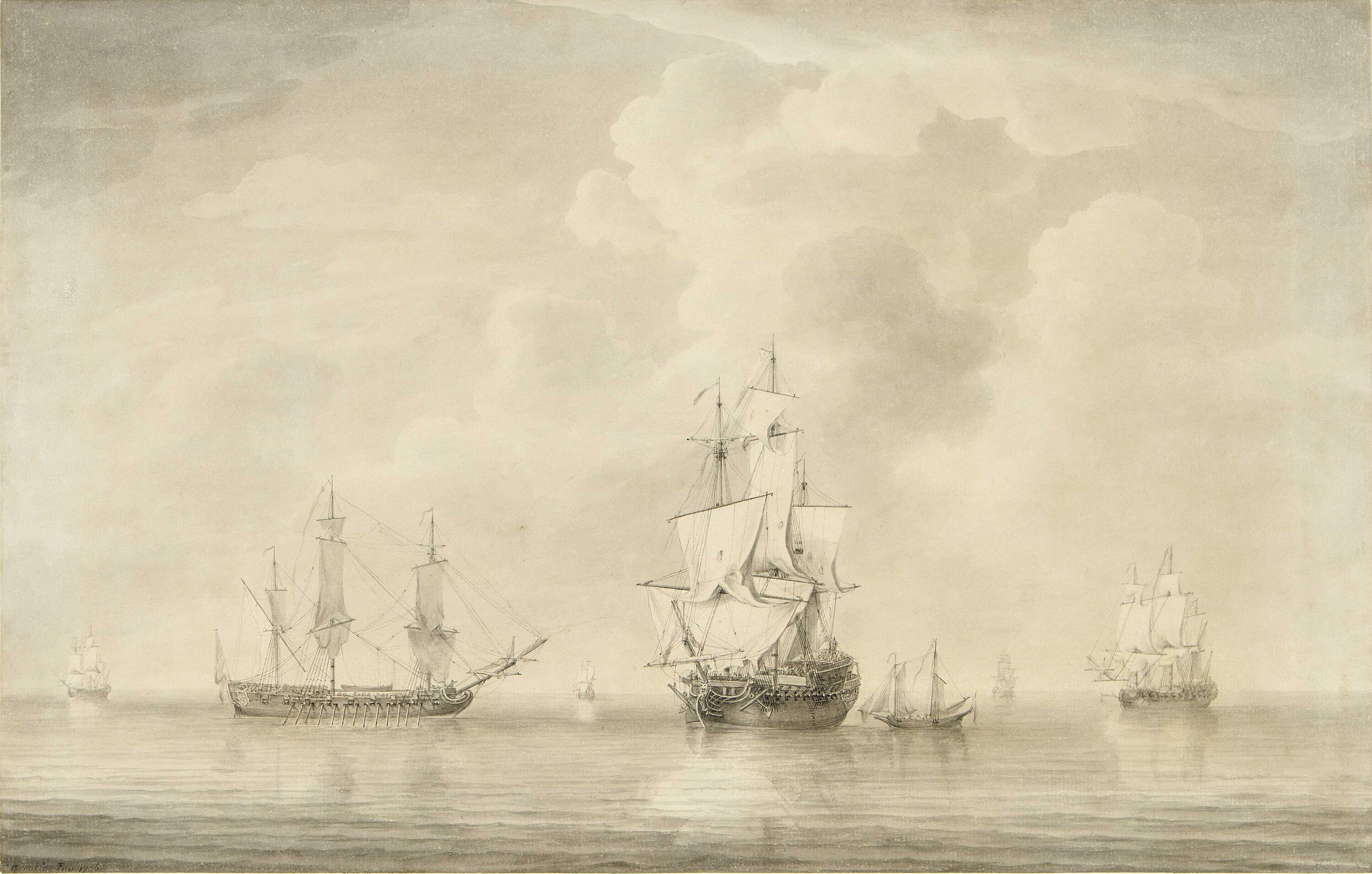
Led by Commander George Walker, the "Royal Family" (King George, Prince Frederick, Duke and Prince George Privateers) take the Nuestra Senora de les Remedios off Louisbourg, 5th February 1746

News of war declarations reached the French fortress at Louisbourg first, on May 3, 1744, and the forces there wasted little time in beginning hostilities, which would become known as by the British King George's War and more generally known as the War of the Austrian Succession. Concerned about their overland supply lines to Quebec, they first raided the British fishing port of Canso on May 23, and then organized an attack on Annapolis Royal, then the capital of Nova Scotia. However, French forces were delayed in departing Louisbourg, and their Mi'kmaq and Maliseet allies decided to attack on their own in early July. Annapolis had received news of the war declaration, and was somewhat prepared when the Indians began besieging Fort Anne. Lacking heavy weapons, the Indians withdrew after a few days. Then, in mid-August, a larger French force arrived before Fort Anne, but was also unable to mount an effective attack or siege against the garrison, which was relieved by the New England company of Gorham's Rangers. In 1745, British colonial forces conducted the Siege of Port Toulouse (St. Peter's) and then captured Fortress Louisbourg after a siege of six weeks. France launched a major expedition to recover Acadia in 1746. Beset by storms, disease, and finally the death of its commander, the Duc d'Anville, it returned to France in tatters without reaching its objective.

=== Conflicts in Nova Scotia (1749–1755) ===
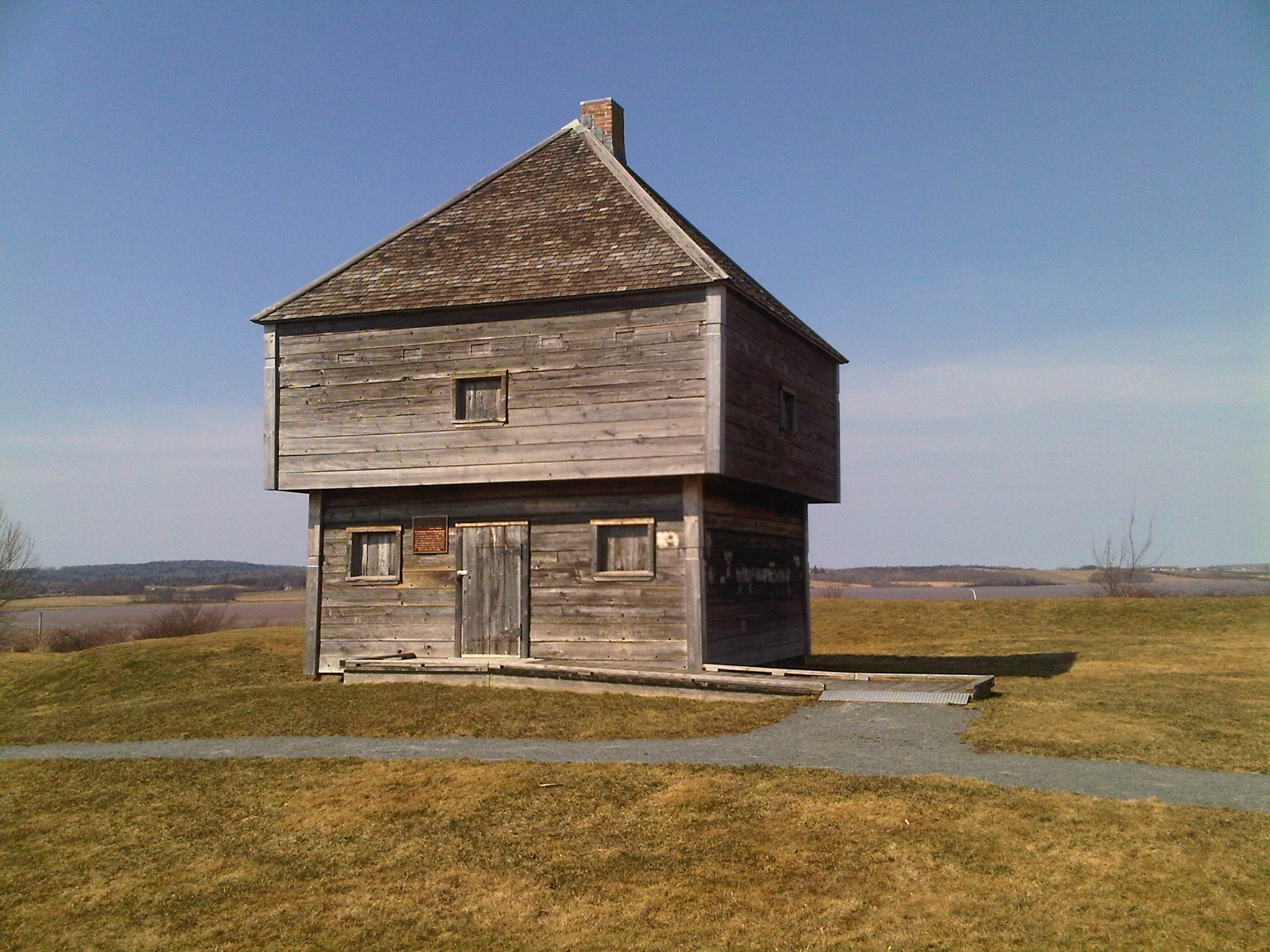
Fort Edward (built 1750). The oldest blockhouse in North America.

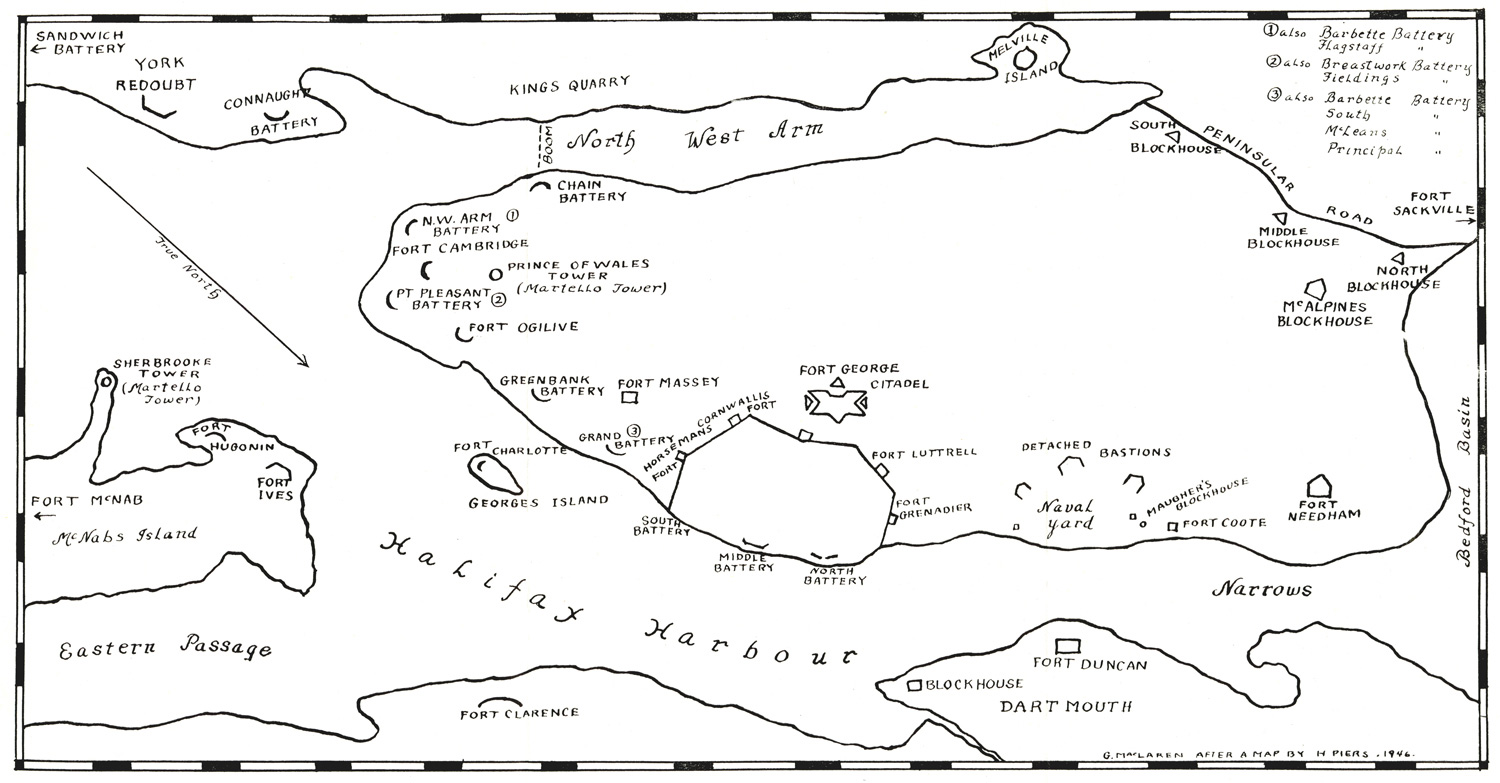
Piers influential mapping of Halifax defences in The Evolution of the Halifax Fortress

Despite the British takeover of the French capital at the Siege of Port Royal in 1710, Nova Scotia remained primarily occupied by Catholic Acadians and Mi'kmaq. To prevent the establishment of Protestant settlements in the region, Mi'kmaq attacked the early British settlements of present-day Shelburne (1715) and Canso (1720). A generation later, Conflicts in Nova Scotia (1749–1755) began when Edward Cornwallis arrived to establish Halifax with 13 transports on June 21, 1749. After settling Halifax, the British quickly began to build other settlements. To guard against Mi'kmaq, Acadian and French attacks on the new Protestant settlements, British fortifications were erected in Halifax (Citadel Hill) (1749), Bedford (Fort Sackville) (1749), Dartmouth (1750), Lunenburg (1753) and Lawrencetown (1754). In the first year of settlement in Lunenburg, poor conditions led weary (mostly Foreign Protestant) settlers tired of resettlement to rise up in insurrection against the British in The Lunenburg Rebellion (1753), led by army captain John Hoffman, with support from Le Loutre. There were numerous Mi'kmaq and Acadian raids on these villages such as the Raid on Dartmouth (1751).

Within 18 months of establishing Halifax in 1749, the British also took firm control of peninsula Nova Scotia by building fortifications in all the major Acadian communities: present-day Windsor (Fort Edward); Grand Pre (Fort Vieux Logis) and Chignecto (Fort Lawrence). (A British fort already existed at the other major Acadian centre of Annapolis Royal, Nova Scotia. Cobequid remained without a fort.) There were numerous Mi'kmaq and Acadian attacks on these fortifications such as the Siege of Grand Pre.

== Late Eighteenth century ==
=== Seven Years' War (1756-1763) ===
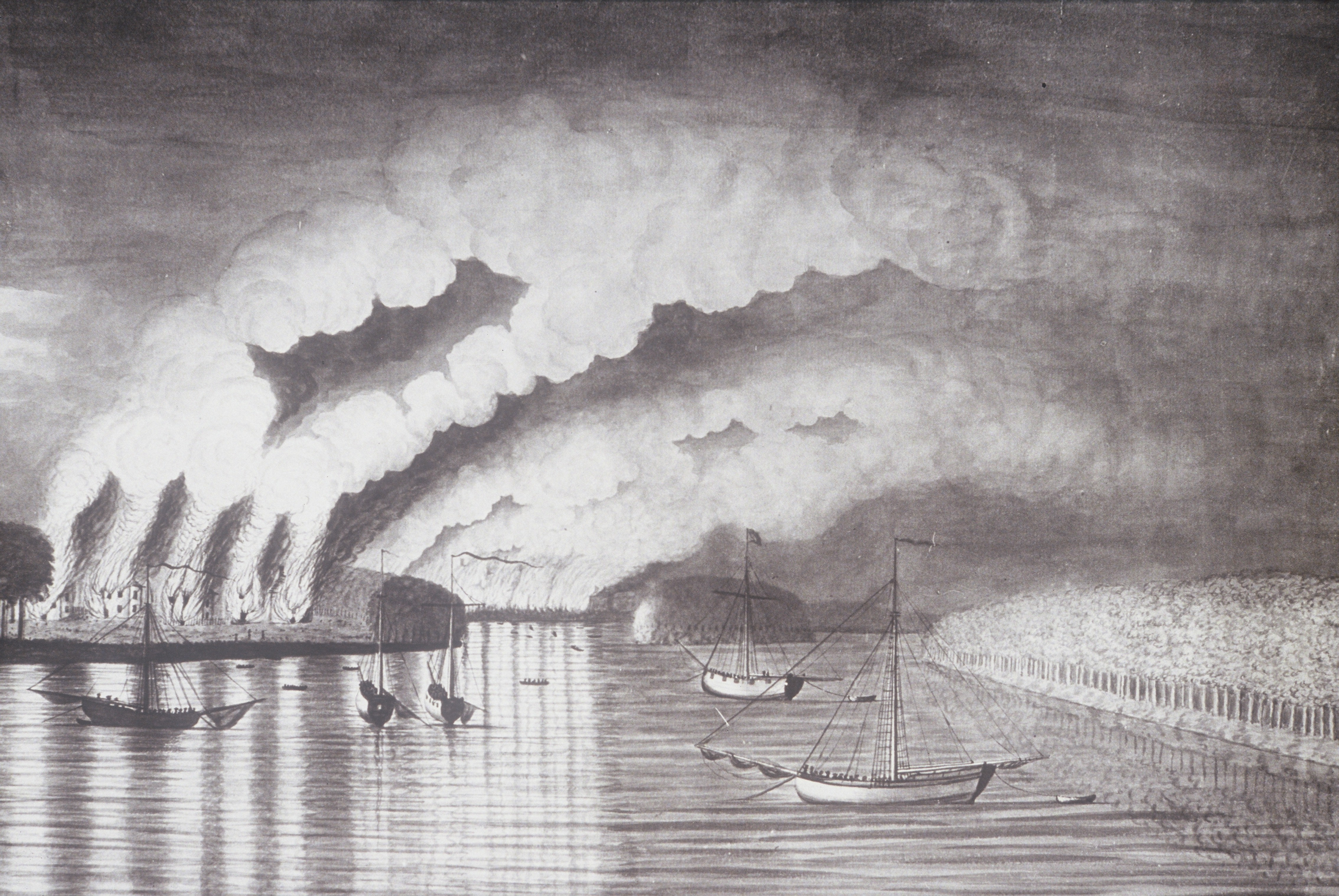
St. John River Campaign: A View of the Plundering and Burning of the City of Grimross (present day Arcadia, New Brunswick) by Thomas Davies in 1758. This is the only contemporaneous image of the Expulsion of the Acadians.

The final colonial war was the Seven Years' War. The British Siege of Port Royal happened in 1710. Over the next forty-five years the Acadians refused to sign an unconditional oath of allegiance to Britain. During this time period Acadians participated in various militia operations against the British and maintained vital supply lines to the French Fortress of Louisbourg and Fort Beausejour.

During the Seven Years' War, the British moved to neutralize any military threat Acadians posed and to interrupt the vital supply lines Acadians provided to Louisbourg by deporting Acadians from Acadia.

The British began the systematic, forced Expulsion of the Acadians with the Bay of Fundy Campaign (1755). Over the next nine years over 12,000 Acadians were removed from Nova Scotia. During the various campaigns of the expulsion, the Acadian and Native resistance to the British intensified.

=== British deportation campaigns (1756-1764) ===
==== Bay of Fundy (1755) ====
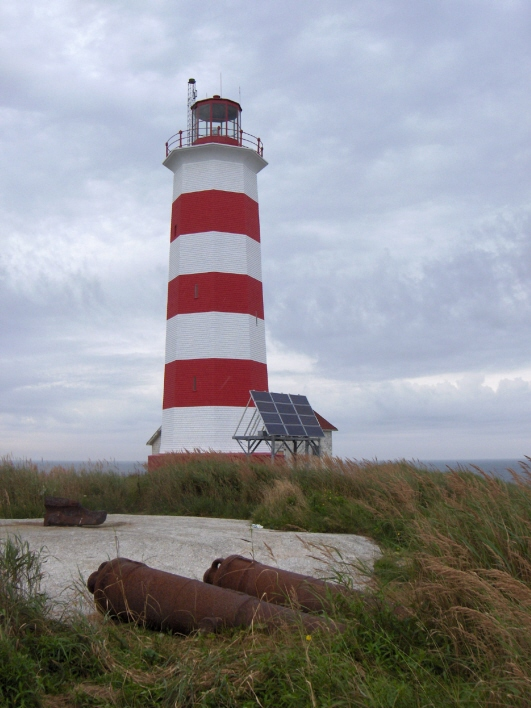
Sambro Island Lighthouse – oldest lighthouse in North America (1758)

The first wave of the expulsion began on August 10, 1755, with the Bay of Fundy Campaign (1755) during the Seven Years' War. The British ordered the expulsion of the Acadians after the Battle of Beausejour (1755). The Campaign started at Chignecto and then quickly moved to Grand Pre, Piziquid (Falmouth/ Windsor, Nova Scotia) and finally Annapolis Royal.

On November 17, 1755, during the Bay of Fundy Campaign at Chignecto, George Scott took 700 troops and attacked twenty houses at Memramcook. They arrested the Acadians who remained and killed two hundred head of livestock, to deprive the French of supplies. Many Acadians tried to escape the Expulsion by retreating to St. John and Petitcodiac rivers, and the Miramichi in New Brunswick. The British cleared the Acadians from these areas in the later campaigns of Petitcodiac River, St. John River, and the Gulf of St. Lawrence in 1758.

==== Cape Sable ====
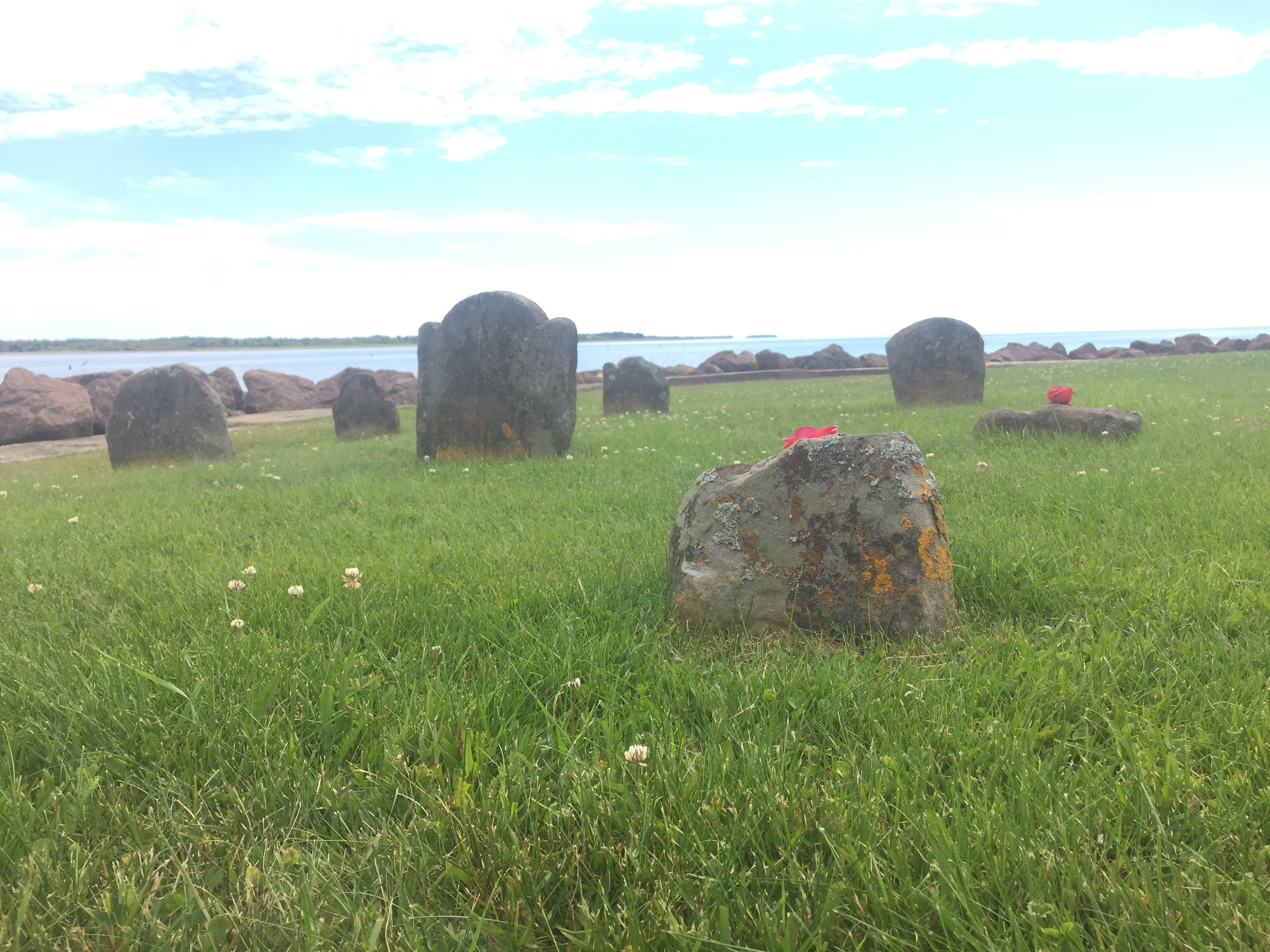
British Gravestones from the Mi'kmaw Raid on Fort Monckton (1756) - oldest known British military gravestones in Canada

Cape Sable included Port La Tour and the surrounding area (a much larger area than simply Cape Sable Island). In April 1756, Major Preble and his New England troops, on their return to Boston, raided a settlement near Port La Tour and captured 72 men, women and children.

In the late summer of 1758, Major Henry Fletcher led the 35th Regiment and a company of Gorham's Rangers to Cape Sable. He cordoned off the cape and sent his men through it. One hundred Acadians and Father Jean Baptiste de Gray surrendered, while about 130 Acadians and seven Mi'kmaq escaped. The Acadian prisoners were taken to Georges Island in Halifax Harbour.

En route to the St. John River Campaign in September 1758, Moncton sent Major Roger Morris, in command of two men-of-war and transport ships with 325 soldiers, to deport more Acadians. On October 28, his troops sent the women and children to Georges Island. The men were kept behind and forced to work with troops to destroy their village. On October 31, they were also sent to Halifax. In the spring of 1759, Joseph Gorham and his rangers arrived to take prisoner the remaining 151 Acadians. They reached Georges Island with them on June 29.

==== Ile St. Jean and Ile Royale ====
The second wave of the Deportation began with the French defeat at the Siege of Louisbourg (1758). Thousands of Acadians were deported from Ile Saint-Jean (Prince Edward Island) and Ile Royale (Cape Breton). The Ile Saint-Jean Campaign resulted in the largest percentage of deaths of the Acadians deported. The highest single event total of fatalities during the Deportation occurred with the sinking of the Violet, with about 280 persons aboard, and the Duke William, with over 360 persons aboard. By the time the second wave of the expulsion had begun, the British had discarded their policy of relocating the Catholic, French-speaking colonists to the Thirteen Colonies. They deported them directly to France. In 1758, hundreds of Ile Royale Acadians fled to one of Boishebert's refugee camps south of Baie des Chaleurs.

==== Petitcodiac River Campaign 1758 ====
This was a series of British military operations from June to November 1758 to deport the Acadians who either lived along the river or had taken refuge there from earlier deportation operations, such as the Ile Saint-Jean Campaign. Benoni Danks and Joseph Gorham's Rangers carried out the operation.

Contrary to Governor Lawrence's direction, New England Ranger Danks engaged in frontier warfare against the Acadians. On July 1, 1758, Danks himself began to pursue the Acadians on the Petiticodiac. They arrived at present day Moncton and Danks’ Rangers ambushed about thirty Acadians, who were led by Joseph Broussard (Beausoleil). Many were driven into the river, three of them were killed and scalped, and others were captured. Broussard was seriously wounded. Danks reported that the scalps were Mi’kmaq and received payment for them. Thereafter, he went down in local lore as "one of the most reckless and brutal" of the Rangers.

==== St. John River Campaign 1759 ====
Colonel Robert Monckton led a force of 1150 British soldiers to destroy the Acadian settlements along the banks of the Saint John River until they reached the largest village of Sainte-Anne des Pays-Bas (present day Fredericton, New Brunswick) in February 1759. Monckton was accompanied by New England Rangers led by Joseph Goreham, Captain Benoni Danks, Moses Hazen and George Scott. The British started at the bottom of the river with raiding Kennebecais and Managoueche (City of Saint John), where the British built Fort Frederick. Then they moved up the river and raided Grimross (Arcadia, New Brunswick), Jemseg, and finally they reached Sainte-Anne des Pays-Bas.

Contrary to Governor Lawrence's direction, New England Ranger Lieutenant Hazen engaged in frontier warfare against the Acadians in what has become known as the "Ste Anne's Massacre". On 18 February 1759, Lieutenant Hazen and about fifteen men arrived at Sainte-Anne des Pays-Bas. The Rangers pillaged and burned the village of 147 buildings, two Mass-houses, besides all the barns and stables. The Rangers burned a large store-house, and with a large quantity of hay, wheat, peas, oats, etc., killing 212 horses, about 5 head of cattle, a large number of hogs and so forth. They also burned the church (located just west of Old Government House, Fredericton).

As well, the rangers tortured and scalped six Acadians and took six prisoners. There is a written record of one of the Acadian survivors Joseph Godin-Bellefontaine. He reported that the Rangers restrained him and then massacred his family in front of him. There are other primary sources that support his assertions.

==== Gulf of St. Lawrence Campaign 1758 ====
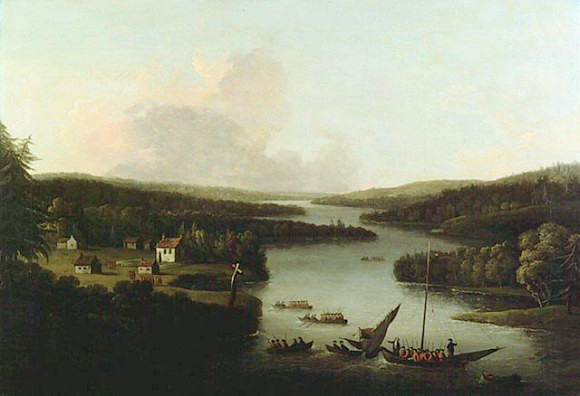
Raid on Miramichi Bay – Burnt Church Village by Captain Hervey Smythe (1758)

In the Gulf of St. Lawrence Campaign (also known as the Gaspee Expedition), British forces raided French villages along present-day New Brunswick and the Gaspé Peninsula coast of the Gulf of Saint Lawrence. Sir Charles Hardy and Brigadier-General James Wolfe commanded the naval and military forces, respectively. After the Siege of Louisbourg (1758), Wolfe and Hardy led a force of 1500 troops in nine vessels to the Gaspé Bay arriving there on September 5. From there they dispatched troops to Miramichi Bay (Sept. 12), Grande-Rivière, Quebec and Pabos (Sept. 13), and Mont-Louis, Quebec (Sept. 14). Over the following weeks, Sir Charles Hardy took four sloops or schooners, destroyed about 200 fishing vessels, and took about 200 prisoners.

==== Restigouche ====
The Acadians took refuge along the Baie des Chaleurs and the Restigouche River. Boishébert had a refugee camp at Petit-Rochelle (which was located perhaps near present-day Pointe-à-la-Croix, Quebec). The year after the Battle of Restigouche, in late 1761, Captain Roderick Mackenzie and his force captured over 330 Acadians at Boishebert's camp.

==== Halifax ====
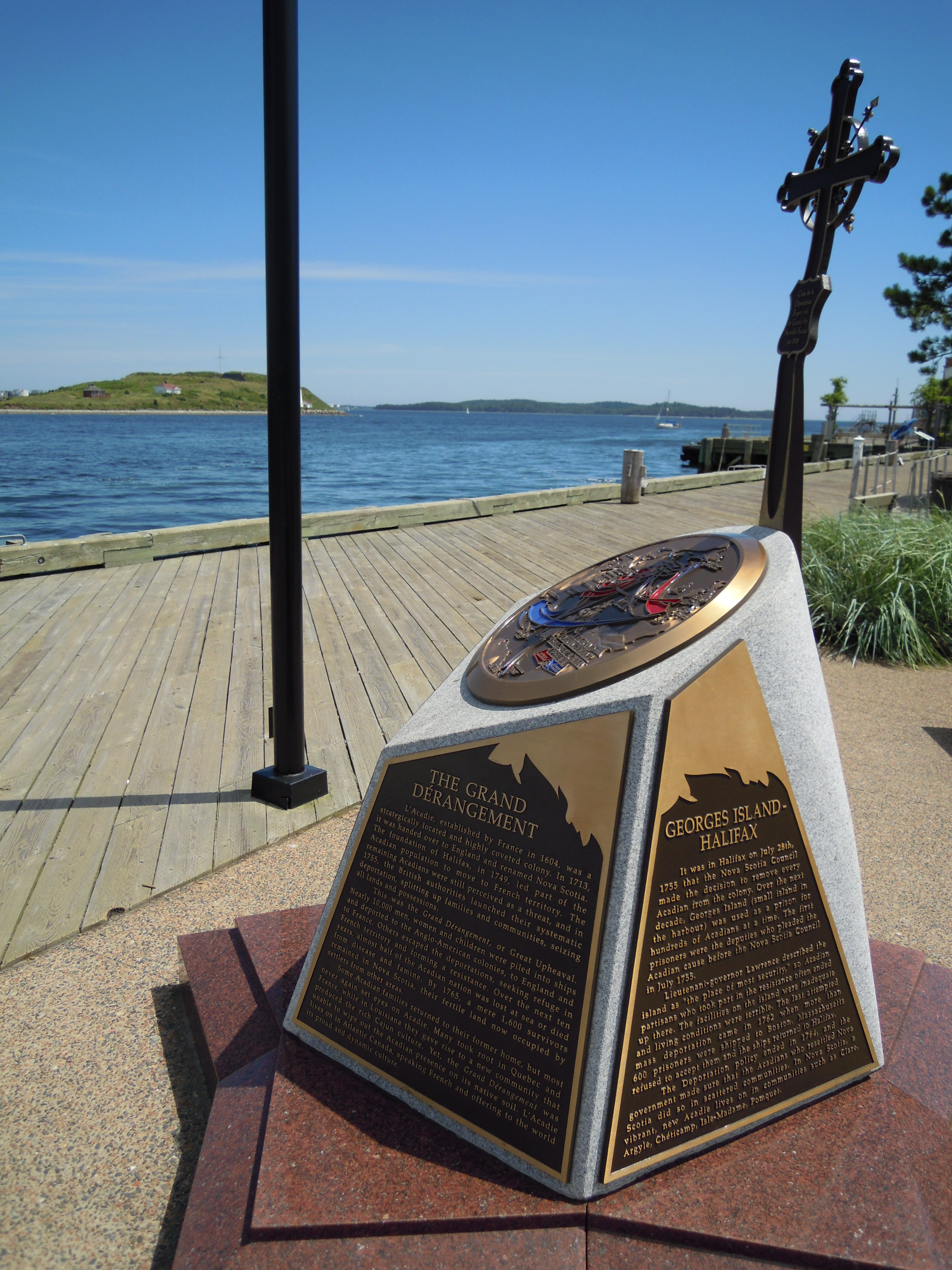
Monument to Imprisoned Acadians on Georges Island (background), Bishops Landing, Halifax

During this time period, Halifax continued to be fortified by the Northwest Arm Battery (1761) and the Point Pleasant Battery (1763), both located in present-day Point Pleasant Park. After the French conquered St. John's, Newfoundland in June 1762, the success galvanized both the Acadians and Natives. They began gathering in large numbers at various points throughout the province and behaving in a confident and, according to the British,"insolent fashion". Officials were especially alarmed when Natives concentrated close to the two principal towns in the province, Halifax and Lunenburg, where there were also large groups of Acadians. The government organized an expulsion of 1300 people, shipping them to Boston. The government of Massachusetts refused the Acadians permission to land and sent them back to Halifax.

Before the deportation, Acadian population was estimated at 14,000 Acadians. Most were deported. Some Acadians escaped to Quebec, or hid among the Mi'kmaq or in the countryside, to avoid deportation until the situation settled down.

The war ended and Britain had gained control over the entire Maritime region.

==== Acadian, Maliseet and Mi’kmaq resistance ====
During the expulsion, French Officer Charles Deschamps de Boishébert led the Mi'kmaq and the Acadians in a guerrilla war against the British. According to Louisbourg account books, by late 1756, the French had regularly dispensed supplies to 700 Natives. From 1756 to the fall of Louisbourg in 1758, the French made regular payments to Chief Jean-Baptiste Cope and other natives for British scalps.

===== Annapolis (Fort Anne) =====
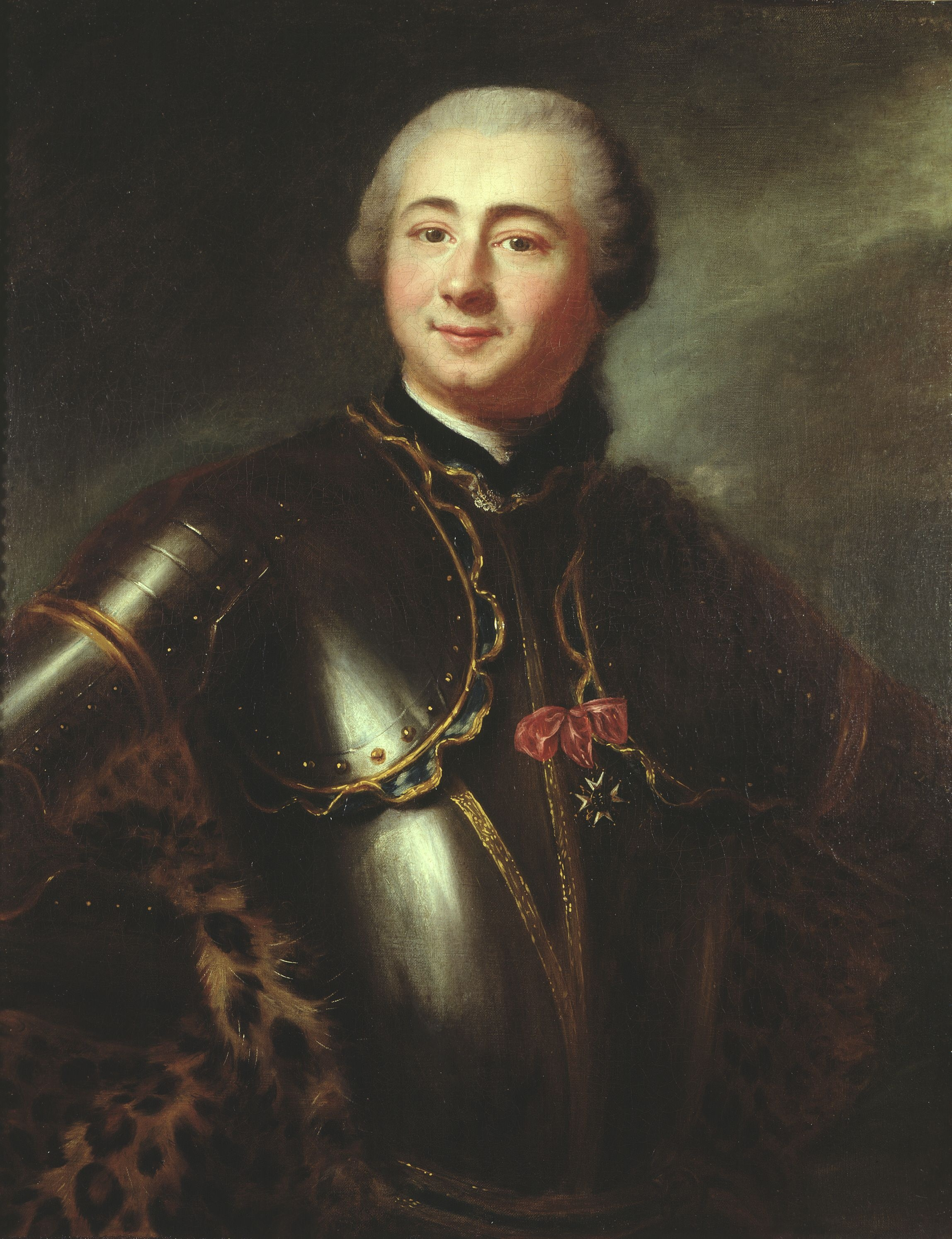
Charles Deschamps de Boishébert et de Raffetot

The Acadians and Mi’kmaq fought in the Annapolis region. They were victorious in the Battle of Bloody Creek (1757). Acadians being deported from Annapolis Royal, Nova Scotia, on the ship Pembroke rebelled against the British crew, took over the ship and sailed to land.

In December 1757, while cutting firewood near Fort Anne, John Weatherspoon was captured by Indians (presumably Mi'kmaq) and carried away to the mouth of the Miramichi River. From there he was eventually sold or traded to the French and taken to Quebec, where he was held until late in 1759 and the Battle of the Plains of Abraham, when General Wolfe's forces prevailed (See Journal of John Witherspoon, Annapolis Royal) .

About 50 or 60 Acadians who escaped the initial deportation are reported to have made their way to the Cape Sable region (which included south western Nova Scotia). From there, they participated in numerous raids on Lunenburg, Nova Scotia.

===== Piziquid (Fort Edward) =====
In the April 1757, a band of Acadian and Mi'kmaq raided a warehouse near Fort Edward, killing thirteen British soldiers. After loading with what provisions they could carry, they set fire to the building. A few days later, the same partisans also raided Fort Cumberland. Because of the strength of the Acadian militia and Mi'kmaq militia, British officer John Knox wrote that "In the year 1757 we were said to be Masters of the province of Nova Scotia, or Acadia, which, however, was only an imaginary possession." He continues to state that the situation in the province was so precarious for the British that the "troops and inhabitants" at Fort Edward, Fort Sackville and Lunenburg "could not be reputed in any other light than as prisoners."

===== Chignecto (Fort Cumberland) =====
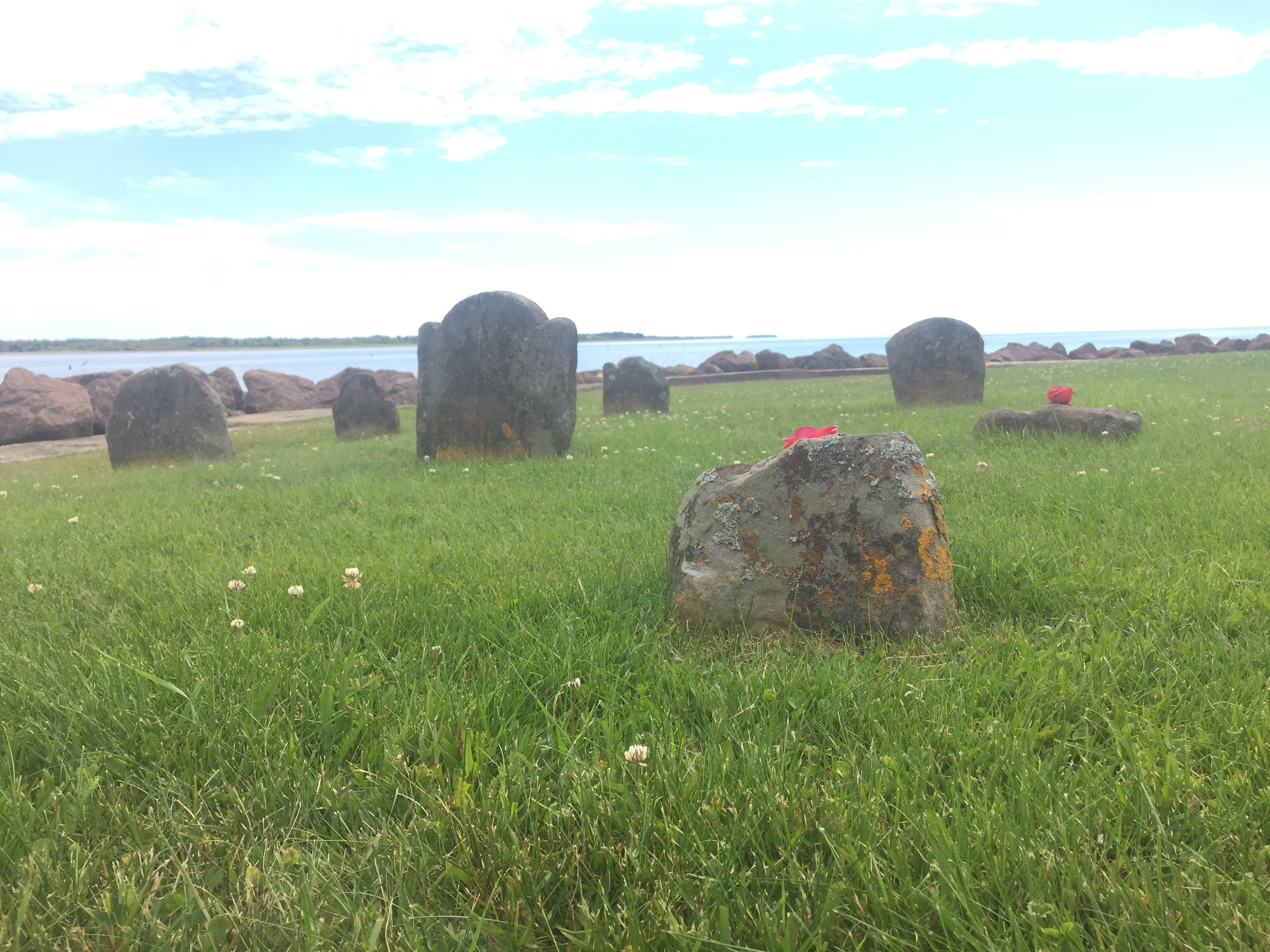
British Gravestones from the Mi'kmaw Raid on Fort Monckton (1756) – oldest known military gravestones in the Maritimes

The Acadians and Mi’kmaq also resisted in the Chignecto region. They were victorious in the Battle of Petitcodiac (1755). In the spring of 1756, a wood-gathering party from Fort Monckton (former Fort Gaspareaux), was ambushed and nine were scalped. In the April 1757, after raiding Fort Edward, the same band of Acadian and Mi'kmaq partisans raided Fort Cumberland, killing and scalping two men and taking two prisoners. July 20, 1757 Mi'kmaq killed 23 and captured two of Gorham's rangers outside Fort Cumberland near present-day Jolicure, New Brunswick. In March 1758, forty Acadian and Mi'kmaq attacked a schooner at Fort Cumberland and killed its master and two sailors. In the winter of 1759, the Mi'kmaq ambushed five British soldiers on patrol while they were crossing a bridge near Fort Cumberland. They were ritually scalped and their bodies mutilated as was common in the savage warfare of the Indians. During the night of 4 April 1759, using canoes, a force of Acadians and French captured the transport. At dawn they attacked the ship Moncton and chased it for five hours down the Bay of Fundy. Although the Moncton escaped, its crew suffered one killed and two wounded.

Others resisted during the St. John River Campaign and the Petitcodiac River Campaign.

===== Lawrencetown =====
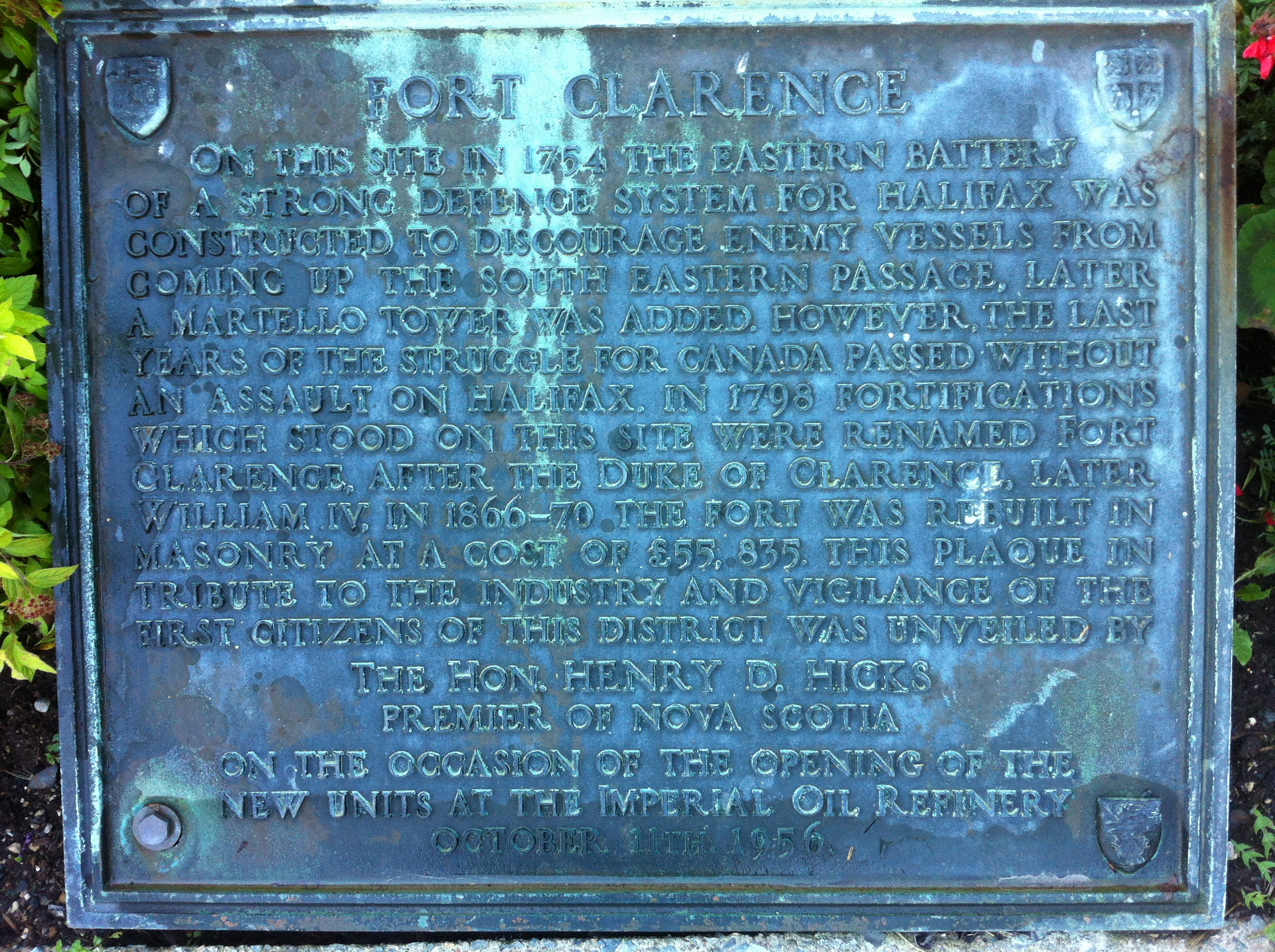
Eastern Battery Plaque, Dartmouth, Nova Scotia

By June 1757, the settlers had to be withdrawn completely from the settlement of Lawrencetown (established 1754) because the number of Indian raids eventually prevented settlers from leaving their houses.

In nearby Dartmouth, Nova Scotia, in the spring of 1759, there was another Mi'kmaq attack on Eastern Battery, in which five soldiers were killed.

===== Maine =====
In present-day Maine, the Mi’kmaq and the Maliseet raided numerous New England villages. At the end of April 1755, they raided Gorham, Maine, killing two men and a family. Next they appeared in New-Boston (Gray) and through the neighbouring towns destroying the plantations. On May 13, they raided Frankfort (Dresden), where two men were killed and a house burned. The same day they raided Sheepscot (Newcastle), and took five prisoners. Two were killed in North Yarmouth on May 29 and one taken captive. They shot one person at Teconnet. They took prisoners at Fort Halifax; two prisoners taken at Fort Shirley (Dresden). They took two captive at New Gloucester as they worked on the local fort. During the Seven Years' War, on June 9, 1758, Indians raided the Woolwich, Maine, killing members of the Preble family and taking others prisoner to Quebec. This incident became known as the last conflict on the Kennebec River.

On 13 August 1758 Boishebert left Miramichi, New Brunswick with 400 soldiers, including Acadians which he led from Port Toulouse. They marched to Fort St George (Thomaston, Maine) and Munduncook (Friendship, Maine). While the former siege was unsuccessful, in the latter raid on Munduncook, they wounded eight British settlers and killed others. This was Boishébert's last Acadian expedition. From there, Boishebert and the Acadians went to Quebec and fought in the Battle of Quebec (1759).

===== Lunenburg =====
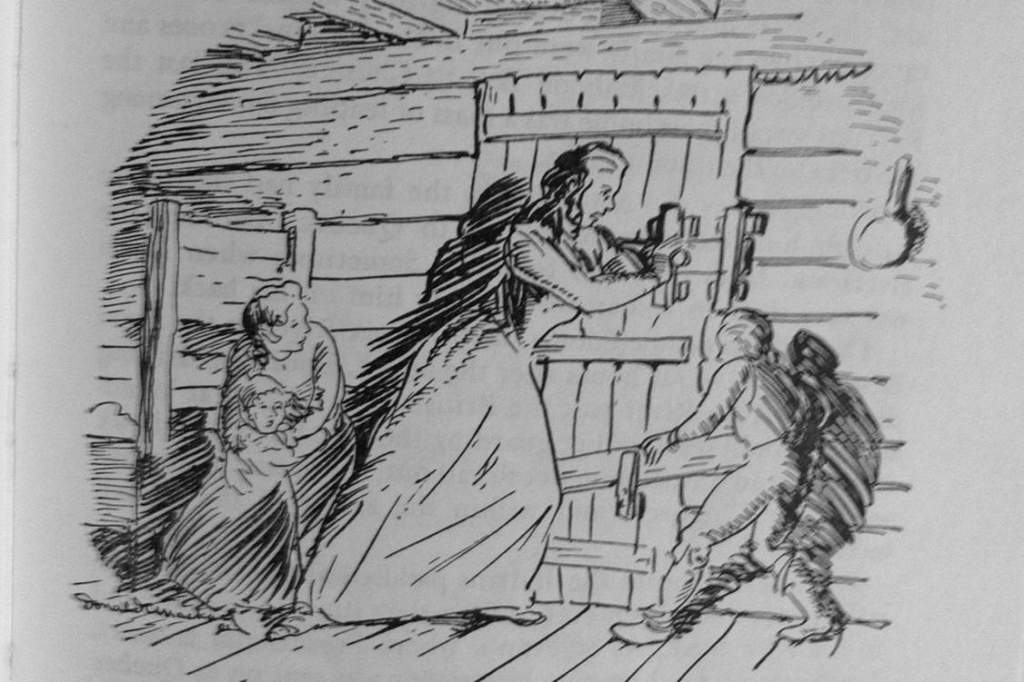
Raid on Lunenburg (1756) by Donald A. Mackay

The Acadians and Mi'kmaq raided the Lunenburg settlement nine times over a three-year period during the war. Boishebert ordered the first Raid on Lunenburg (1756). Following the raid of 1756, in 1757, there was a raid on Lunenburg in which six people from the Brissang family were killed. The following year, March 1758, there was a raid on the Lunenburg Peninsula at the Northwest Range (present-day Blockhouse, Nova Scotia) when five people were killed from the Ochs and Roder families. By the end of May 1758, most of those on the Lunenburg Peninsula abandoned their farms and retreated to the protection of the fortifications around the town of Lunenburg, losing the season for sowing their grain. For those that did not leave their farms for the town, the number of raids intensified.

During the summer of 1758, there were four raids on the Lunenburg Peninsula. On 13 July 1758, one person on the LaHave River at Dayspring was killed and another seriously wounded by a member of the Labrador family. The next raid happened at Mahone Bay, Nova Scotia, on 24 August 1758, when eight Mi'kmaq attacked the family homes of Lay and Brant. While they killed three people in the raid, the Mi'kmaq were unsuccessful in taking their scalps, which was the common practice for payment from the French. Two days, later, two soldiers were killed in a raid on the blockhouse at LaHave, Nova Scotia. Almost two weeks later, on 11 September, a child was killed in a raid on the Northwest Range. Another raid happened on 27 March 1759, in which three members of the Oxner family were killed. The last raid happened on 20 April 1759. The Mi’kmaq killed four settlers at Lunenburg who were members of the Trippeau and Crighton families.

===== Halifax =====
On 2 April 1756, Mi'kmaq received payment from the Governor of Quebec for 12 British scalps taken at Halifax. Acadian Pierre Gautier, son of Joseph-Nicolas Gautier, led Mi’kmaq warriors from Louisbourg on three raids against Halifax in 1757. In each raid, Gautier took prisoners or scalps or both. The last raid happened in September and Gautier went with four Mi’kmaq and killed and scalped two British men at the foot of Citadel Hill. (Pierre went on to participate in the Battle of Restigouche.)

In July 1759, Mi'kmaq and Acadians kill five Britons in Dartmouth, opposite McNabb's Island.

=== Halifax Treaties ===
After agreeing to several peace treaties, the seventy-five year period of war ended with the Halifax Treaties between the British and the Mi'kmaq (1761). (In commemoration of these treaties, Nova Scotians annually celebrate Treaty Day on October 1.) To enforce the treaties, the British continued to build fortifications in the province (see Fort Ellis and Fort Belcher). Despite the treaties being clear about Mi'kmaq "submission" to the British, their agreeing to become British subjects, give up robbery and murder, and follow the rule of law, there some contemporary historians who claim the treaties did not indicate the Mi'kmaq surrendered to the British. In the event, there was no further trouble of note from this tribe.

=== Headquarters of the North American Station ===
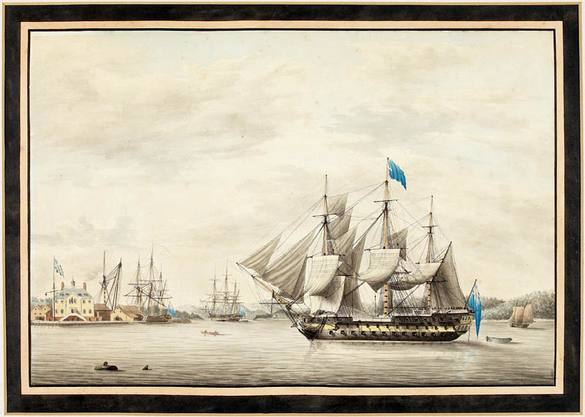
Halifax: Royal Navy's North American Station headquarters (1797)

Halifax was the headquarters for the Royal Navy's North American Station for sixty years (1758–1818). Halifax Harbour had served as a Royal Navy seasonal base from the founding of the city in 1749, using temporary facilities and a careening beach on Georges Island. Land and buildings for a permanent Naval Yard were purchased in 1758 and the Yard was officially commissioned in 1759. Land and buildings for a permanent Naval Yard were purchased by the Royal Naval Dockyard, Halifax in 1758 and the Yard was officially commissioned in 1759. The Yard served as the main base for the British Royal Navy in North American during the Seven Years' War, the American Revolution, the French Revolutionary Wars and the War of 1812. In 1818 Halifax became the summer base for the squadron which shifted to the Royal Naval Dockyard, Bermuda for the remainder of the year. One of the most famous commanders of the station was Robert Digby (1781–1783). After the surrender of New York City in 1783, Digby helped to organise the evacuation of some 1,500 United Empire Loyalists to the small port of Conway in Nova Scotia. The settlement he led transformed the tiny village into a town, which in 1787 was renamed Digby, Nova Scotia.

=== American War of Independence (1775-1783) ===
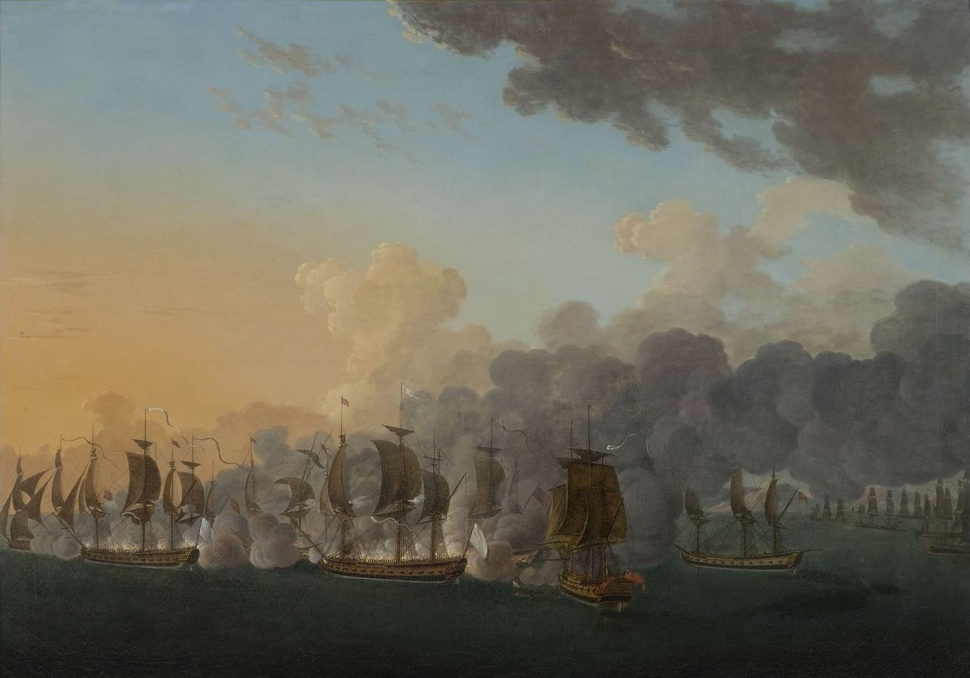
Naval battle off Cape Breton (1781)

At the outbreak of the outbreak of the American War of Independence in 1775, many Nova Scotians were New England-born and were sympathetic to the American Patriots against the British government. This support somewhat eroded over the first two years of the war as American Privateers attacked Nova Scotian villages and shipping to try to interrupt Nova Scotian trade with the American Loyalists still in New England who were opposing the Revolution. During the war, American privateers captured 225 vessels either leaving or arriving at Nova Scotia ports.

== Nineteenth century ==
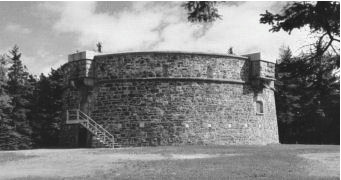
Prince of Wales Tower – oldest Martello Tower in North America (1796), Point Pleasant Park, Halifax, Nova Scotia, Canada

=== French Revolutionary Wars ===
Halifax was now the bastion of British strength on the East Coast of North America. Local merchants also took advantage of the exclusion of American trade to the British colonies in the Caribbean, beginning a long trade relationship with the West Indies. However, the most significant growth began with the beginning of the French Revolutionary Wars. Military spending and the opportunities of wartime shipping and trading stimulated growth led by local merchants such as Simeon Perkins, Charles Ramage Prescott and Enos Collins. The most renown privateer was Captain Alexander Godfrey of the Rover from Liverpool, Nova Scotia.

==== Conquest of Saint Pierre and Miquelon ====
In 1793, under the command of Brigadier General James Ogilvie led two vessels – the Alligator and the schooner Diligent – and three transports gathered to conquer French occupied Saint Pierre and Miquelon. While in Halifax, the ships were outfitted and Ogilvie impressed the citizens of Halifax to join him on the expedition. There were 310 troops primarily from the 4th Regiment of Foot. They captured Saint Pierre on 14 May without firing a shot. They also captured 18 small vessels carrying fish, and two American schooners with provisions and naval stores. Trepassey joined them a day later and then sailed to Miquelon to complete the conquest. Prize money for the capture of the islands was paid in October 1796. They captured the Prefect of Saint Pierre and Miquelon, Antoine-Nicolas Dandasne-Danseville, and several hundred prisoners who were all brought to Halifax. Dandasne-Danseville remained a prisoner in Halifax until 1814. He married a woman from Dartmouth and had children. Nova Scotia Governor John Wentworth rented Kavanagh's Island (aka Melville Island) to house 600 French prisoners that had been captured on St. Pierre and Miquelon. The commander of the Halifax garrison, Brigadier General James Ogilvie, objected to the plan, and instead housed the prisoners at Cornwallis Barracks in Halifax. Several prisoners were able to escape from the makeshift prison, and the rest were sent to Guernsey in June 1794.

==== Prince Edward arrives ====
By 1796, Prince Edward, Duke of Kent, was sent to take command of Nova Scotia. Many of the city's forts were designed by him, and he left an indelible mark on the city in the form of many public buildings of Georgian architecture, and a dignified British feel to the city itself. It was during this time that Halifax truly became a city. Many landmarks and institutions were built during his tenure, from the Town Clock on Citadel Hill to St. George's Round Church, fortifications in the Halifax Defence Complex were built up, businesses established, and the population boomed.

=== Napoleonic Wars ===
==== Trafalgar Day ====
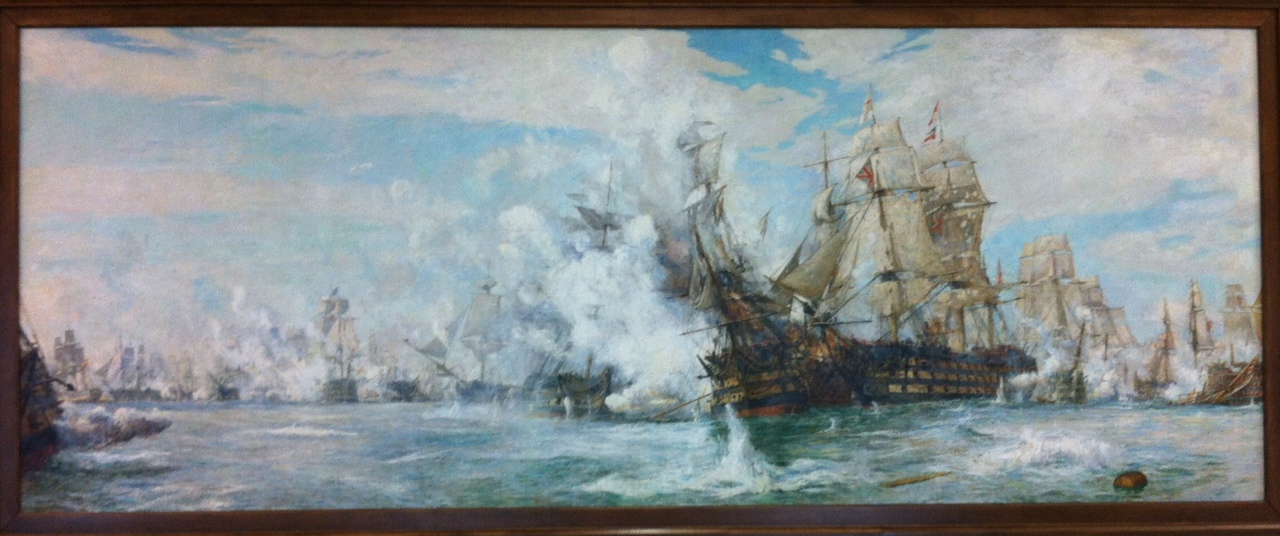
Battle of Trafalgar mural by William Lionel Wyllie, Juno Tower, CFB Halifax

During the Napoleonic Wars, Trafalgar Day was celebrated in Nova Scotia and across the Commonwealth on October 21 throughout the 19th century until the end of World War I. The day commemorated Horatio Nelson’s victory over Napoleon in 1805, which has been called "the most famous naval battle in history and the most decisive engagement of the Napoleonic Wars, Trafalgar cemented Britain’s supremacy on the high seas." Nova Scotians also fought at Trafalgar: John Houlton Marshall, George Augustus Westphal, Phillip Westphal. In 1905, the battles centenary, there was two days of festivities in Halifax. Flags were flown at half-mast and the Halifax Herald stated that October 21 was arguably the "most memorable day in all British history". In 1927, the Canadian Pacific Railway built the Lord Nelson Hotel. The bi-centennial was also marked by recognition in various museums in the province.

==== Halifax Impressment Riot ====
The towns people and especially seafarers were constantly on-guard of the press gangs of the Royal Navy.

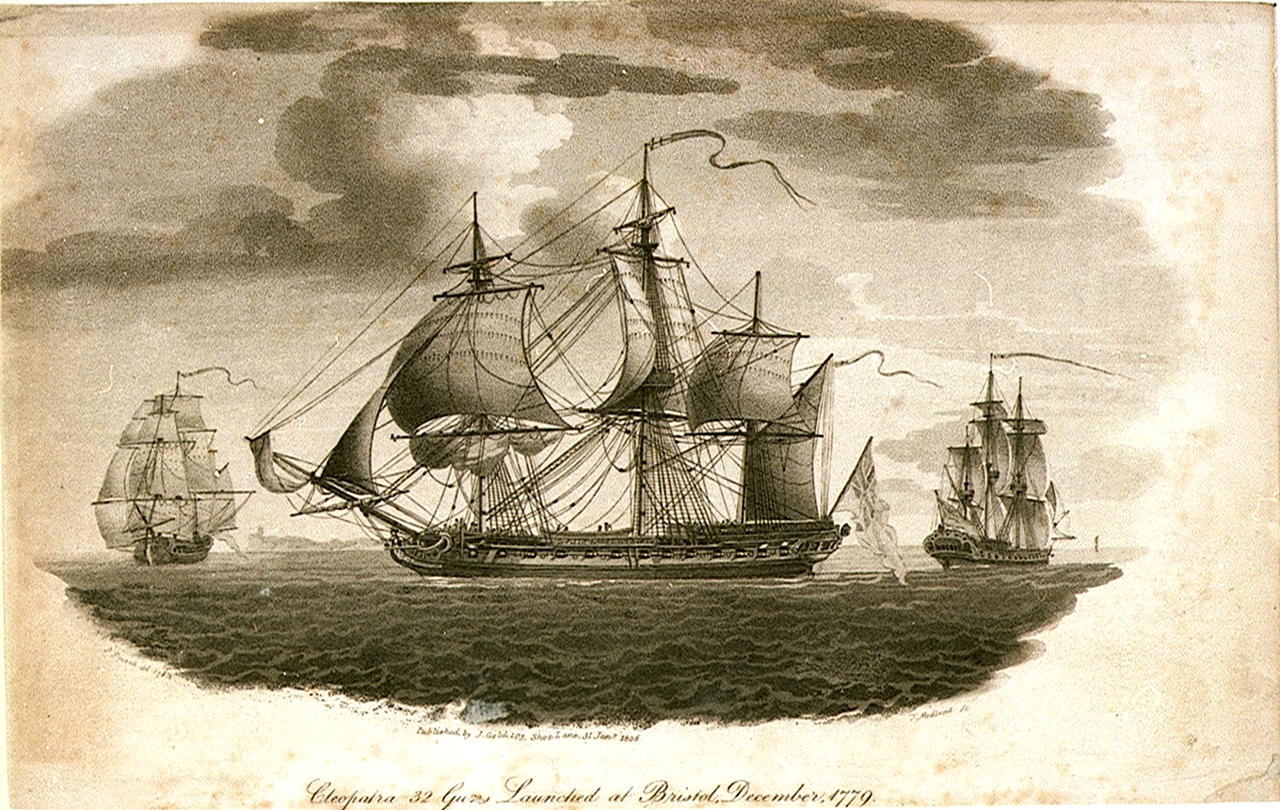
A press gang from HMS Cleopatra started the Halifax Riot (1805). Image by Nicholas Pocock

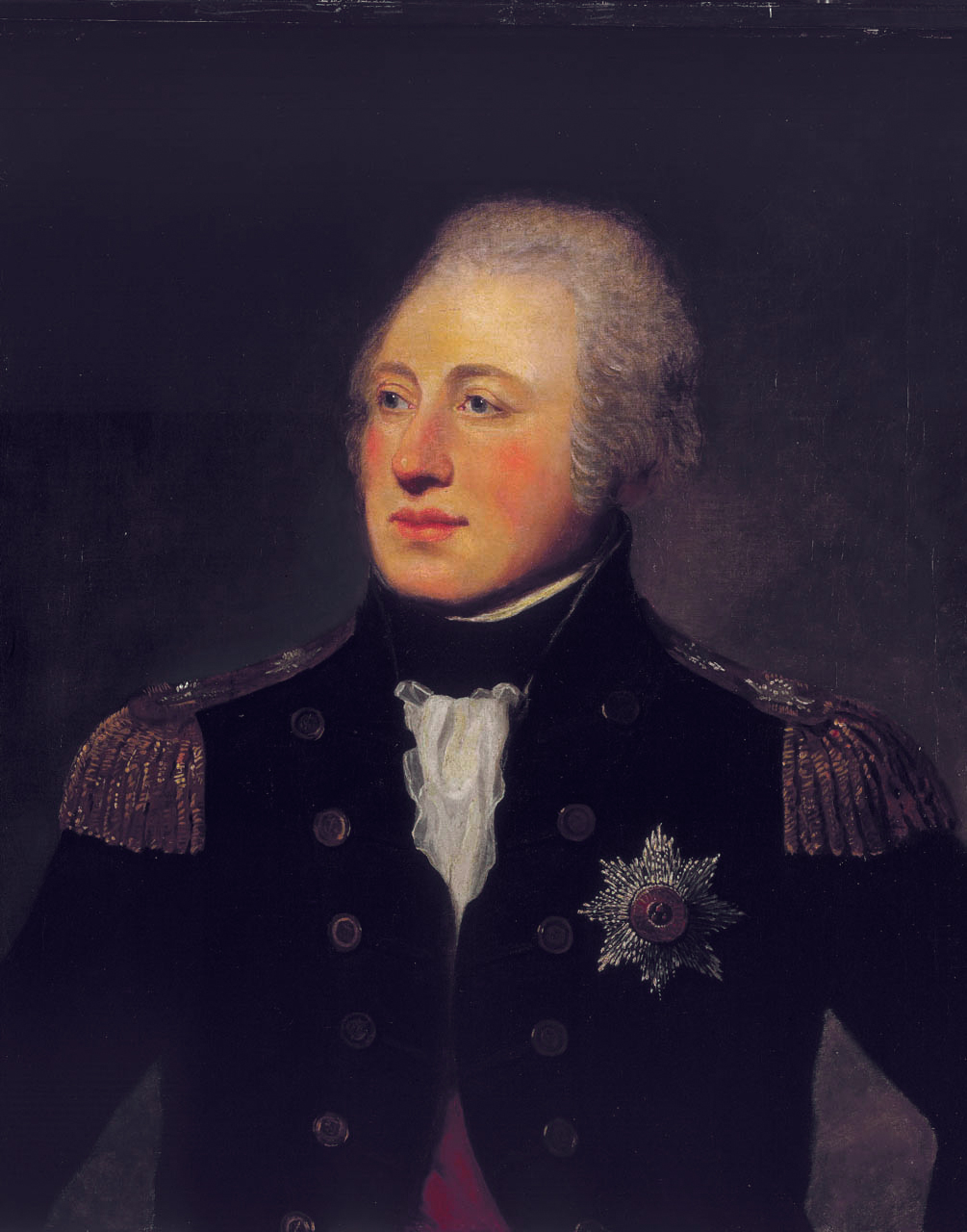
Vice Admiral Andrew Mitchell, who ordered HMS Cleopatra press gang ashore to Halifax

The Navy's manning problems in Nova Scotia peaked in 1805. Warships were short-handed from high desertion rates, and naval captains were handicapped in filling those vacancies by provincial impressment regulations. Desperate for sailors, the Navy pressed them all over the North Atlantic region in 1805, from Halifax and Charlottetown to Saint John and Quebec City. In early May, Vice-Admiral Andrew Mitchell sent press gangs from several warships into downtown Halifax. They conscripted men first and asked questions later, rounding up dozens of potential recruits.

The breaking point came in October 1805, when Vice-Admiral Mitchell ordered press gangs from HMS Cleopatra to the streets of Halifax armed with bayonets, sparking a major riot in which one man was killed and several others were injured. Wentworth lashed out at Mitchell for sparking urban unrest and breaking provincial impressment laws, and his administration exploited this violent episode to put even tighter restrictions of recruiting in Nova Scotia.

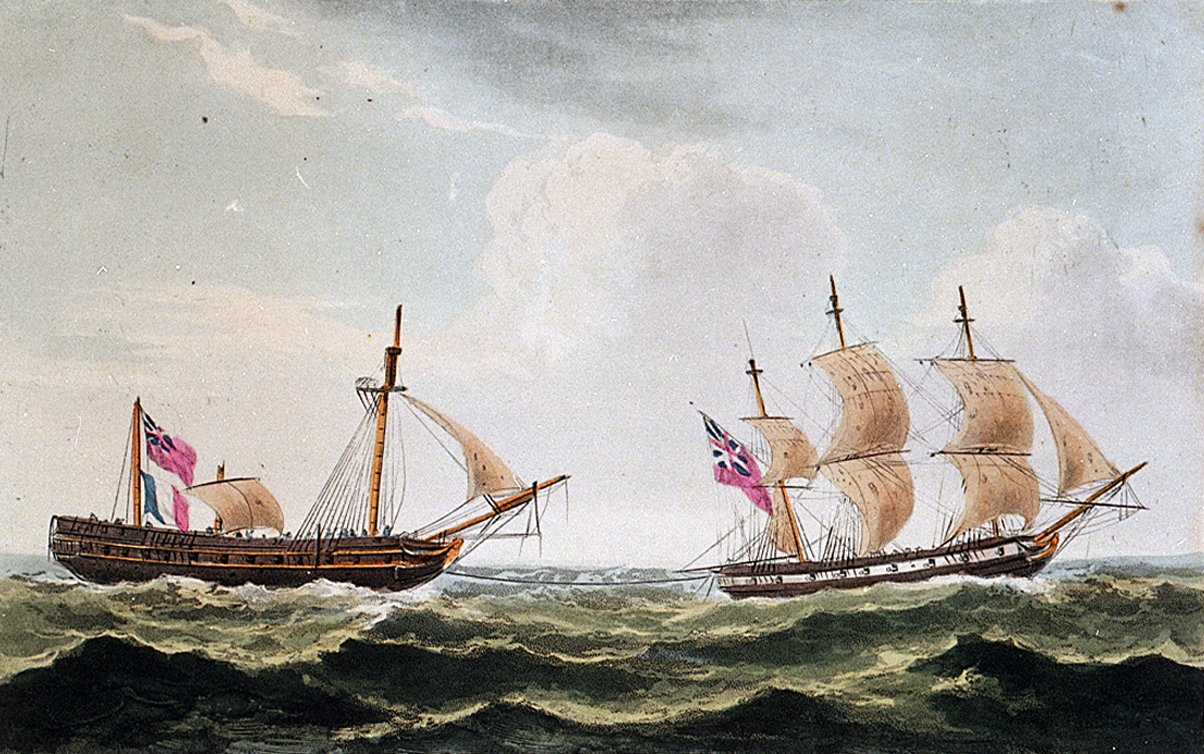
Furieuse being taken in tow to Halifax by HMS Bonne Citoyenne on 6 August 1809

Stemming from impressment disturbances, civil-naval relations deteriorated in Nova Scotia from 1805 to the War of 1812. HMS Whiting was in Liverpool for only about a week, but the threat of impressment loomed over the small town the entire time and naval impressment remained a serious issue for sailors along the South Shore. After leaving Liverpool, Whiting entered Shelburne and impressed several of its inhabitants, with press gangs breaking into homes and leading more than a dozen families to move closer in the forest to avoid further impressment.

==== Invasion of Martinique (1809) ====
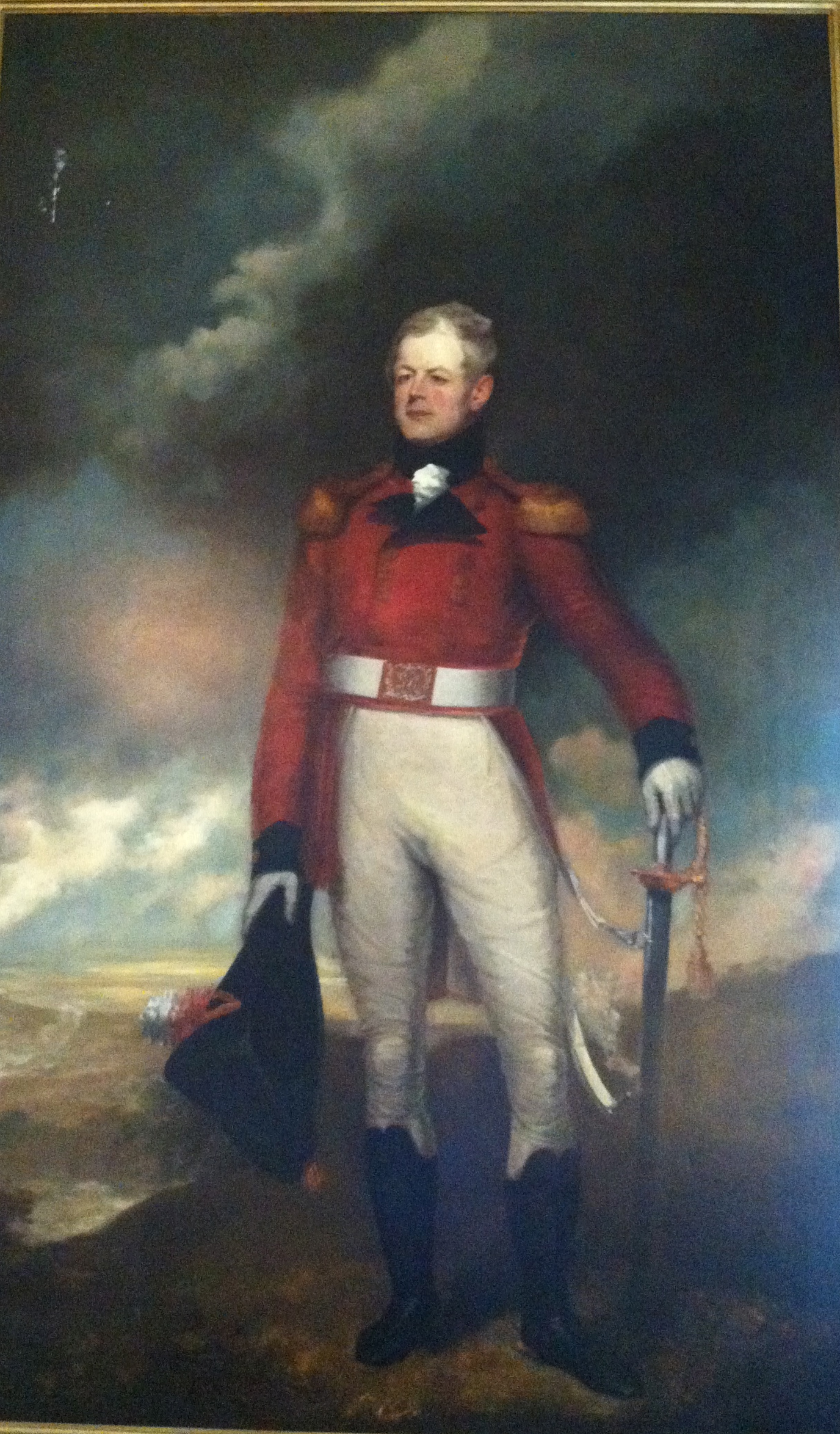
Sir George Prevost with sword from Nova Scotia House of Assembly to commemorate his victory at Martinique. Painting by Robert Field, The Halifax Club, Halifax, Nova Scotia

Lt Governor of Nova Scotia George Prevost mobilized the British Navy in Halifax for the Invasion of Martinique (1809) (after which Martinique, Nova Scotia and Martinique Beach are named). In an effort to appease House of Assembly leader William Cottnam Tonge, Prevost appointed him to be his second-in-command. They departed from Halifax on 6 December 1808. Martinique was captured, and Prevost returned to Halifax on 15 April 1809 and the town gave a ball at Mason Hall to commemorate the victory. On 10 June 1808, the House of Assembly passed the supply bill, and also voted to use 200 guineas to purchase a sword for Prevost as a sign of their approval for Prevost's conduct during the expedition against Martinique. Three soldiers died in the invasion, all from the Royal Welch Fusiliers and are commemorated with a plaque in St. George's (Round) Church, Halifax, Nova Scotia. Prevost believed he had successfully maintained the crown's prerogative at Martinique and was celebrated upon his return to Nova Scotia. Prevost had become a popular lieutenant governor.

=== War of 1812 ===
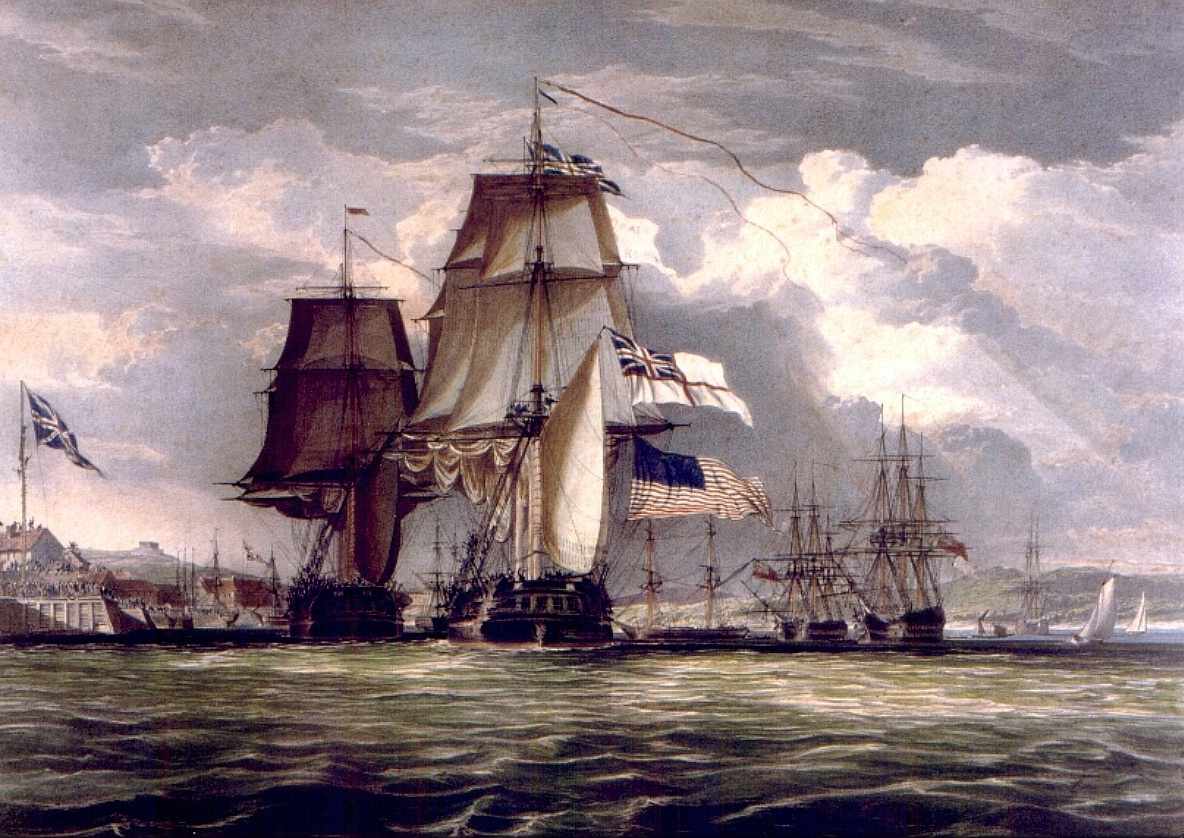
War of 1812, Halifax, Nova Scotia: HMS Shannon leading the captured American frigate USS Chesapeake into Halifax Harbour (1813)

In the lead-up to the War of 1812, the Little Belt affair created excitement in Nova Scotia. Having departed Annapolis Royal, on May 27, 1811, the British vessel Little Belt arrived in Halifax with many of the crew killed or wounded after having been attacked by an American vessel. At the outset of the war, Nova Scotia was again alarmed when USS Constitution was off the coast and defeated HMS Guerriere, which had just departed from Halifax. (A month earlier HMS Belvidera had arrived in port having escaped an attack.)

During the War of 1812, Nova Scotia's contribution to the war effort was communities either purchasing or building various privateer ships to seize American vessels. Three members of the community of Lunenburg, Nova Scotia purchased a privateer schooner and named it Lunenburg on August 8, 1814. The Nova Scotian privateer vessel captured seven American vessels. Liverpool Packet from Liverpool, Nova Scotia, was another Nova Scotia privateer vessel that caught over fifty ships in the war – the most of any privateer in Canada. Sir John Sherbrooke was also very successful during the war, being the largest privateer on the Atlantic coast. (See Historic Properties (Halifax))

Sir John Coape Sherbrooke – Lt Gov. of Nova Scotia departed Halifax and conquered Maine, renaming the colony New Ireland

Perhaps the most dramatic moment in the war for Nova Scotia was when HMS Shannon led the captured American frigate USS Chesapeake into Halifax Harbour (1813). The captain of Shannon was injured and Nova Scotian Provo Wallis took command of the ship to escort Chesapeake to Halifax. Many of the prisoners were kept at Deadman's Island, Halifax. At the same time, there was HMS Hogue's traumatic capture of the American privateer Young Teazer off Chester, Nova Scotia. HMS Atalante also created alarm when it was wrecked just off of Halifax in November 1813. Halifax also received in October 1814, 30 wounded from one of the most violent privateer clashes of the war, which happened between a cutting-out party from HMS Endymion and Prince de Neufchatel on the south side of Nantucket. After 20 minutes of savage fighting, the cutting-out party was defeated. British casualties amounted to 28 killed, 37 wounded, and 28 taken prisoner. The Americans reported losing 7 men killed and 24 wounded.

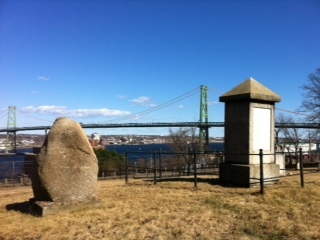
Gravestones for the casualties of HMS Shannon's capture of USS Chesapeake. USS Chesapeake (left) and HMS Shannon (right), Royal Navy Burying Ground (Halifax, Nova Scotia)

On September 3, 1814, a British fleet from Halifax, Nova Scotia, began to lay siege to Maine to re-establish British title to Maine east of the Penobscot River, an area the British had renamed "New Ireland". Carving off "New Ireland" from New England had been a goal of the British government and settlers of Nova Scotia ("New Scotland") since the American Revolution. The British expedition involved 8 war-ships and 10 transports (carrying 3,500 British regulars) that were under the overall command of Sir John Coape Sherbrooke, then Lt. Gov. of Nova Scotia. On July 3, 1814, the expedition captured the coastal town of Castine, Maine and then went on to raid Belfast, Machias, Eastport, Hampden and Bangor (See Battle of Hampden). After the war, Maine was returned to America through the Treaty of Ghent. The brief life of the colony yielded customs revenues, called the "Castine Fund", which were subsequently used to finance a military library in Halifax and found Dalhousie College. Dalhousie University has a street named "Castine Way".

The most famous soldier that was buried in Nova Scotia during the war was Robert Ross (British Army officer). Ross was responsible for the Burning of Washington, including the White House. (Other famous Nova Scotians who served in the war are:George Edward Watts, Sir George Augustus Westphal, Sir Edward Belcher, and Philip Westphal, all of whom are commemorated by the Historic Sites and Monuments Board of Canada plaques at Stadacona, CFB Halifax.)

=== Crimean War ===
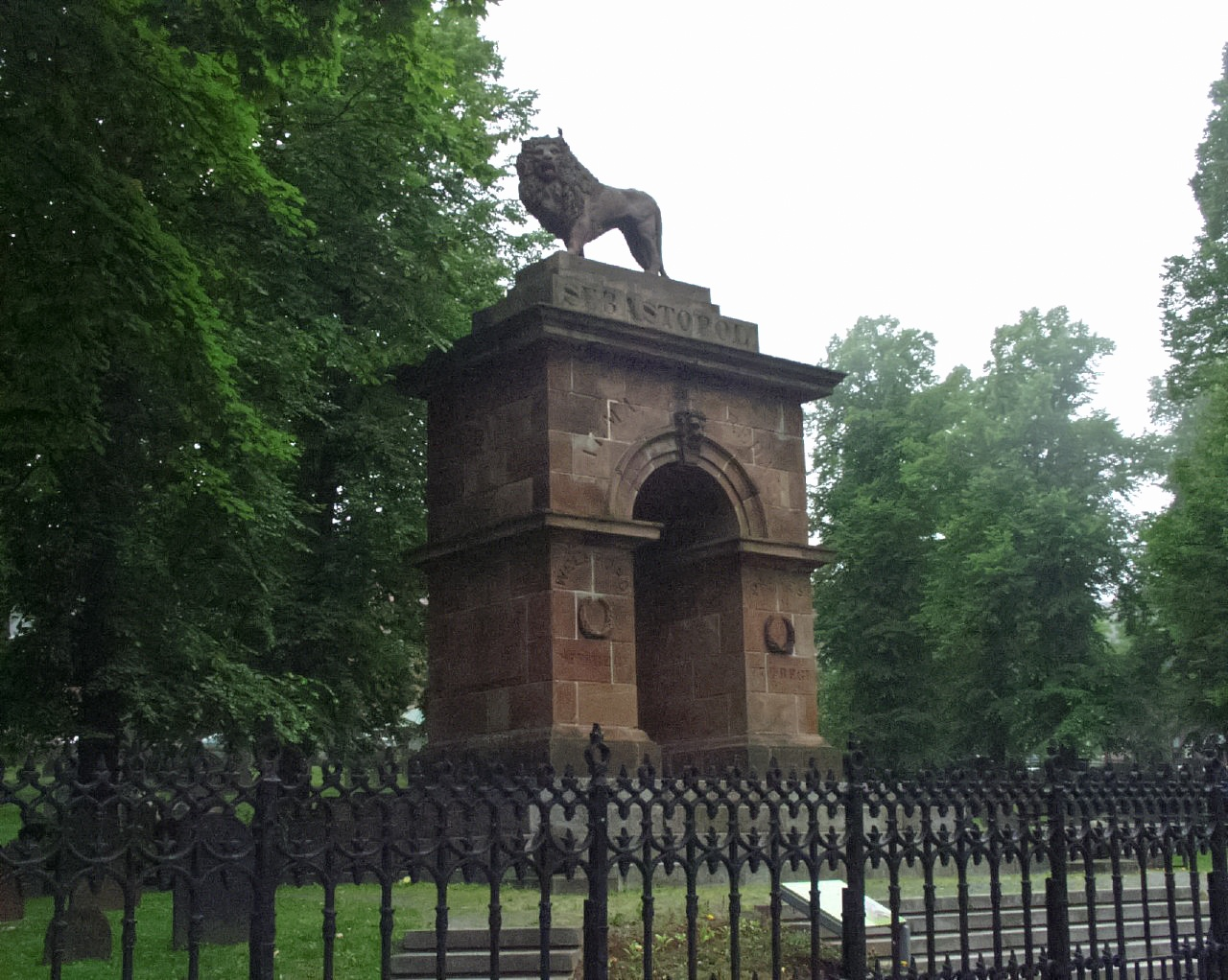
Sebastopol Monument, Halifax, Nova Scotia – Only Crimean War Monument in North America

Nova Scotians fought in the Crimean War. The Sebastopol Monument in Halifax is the fourth oldest war monument in Canada and the only Crimean War monument in North America. Another Nova Scotian soldier who fought with distinction during the Crimean war was Sir William Williams, 1st Baronet, of Kars (after whom Port Williams, Nova Scotia and Karsdale, Nova Scotia are named).

In the wake of the Crimean War, the second black military unit in Canada (one of the first in Nova Scotia) was formed, Victoria Rifles (Nova Scotia) (1860).

One resident of Halifax named his home Alma Villa after the Battle of Alma.

=== Indian Mutiny ===
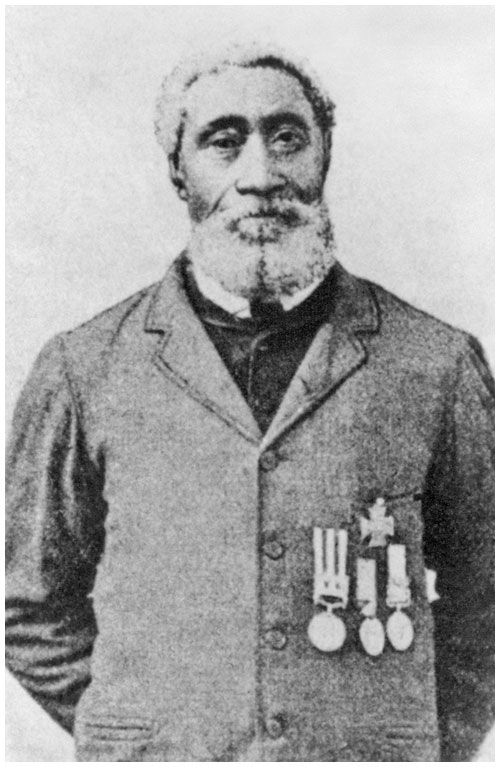
William Hall, VC

Nova Scotians also participated in the Indian Mutiny in 1857 to 1858. Two of the most famous were William Hall (VC) and Sir John Eardley Inglis (namesake of Inglis Street, Halifax), both of whom participated in the Siege of Lucknow (namesake of Lucknow St., Halifax). (The community Havelock, Nova Scotia is named after a hero of the mutiny.) The 78th (Highlanders) Regiment of Foot were famous for their involvement with the siege and were later posted to Citadel Hill (Fort George).

=== American Civil War ===
Over 200 Nova Scotians have been identified as fighting in the American Civil War (1861–1865), at least 119 of whom were Black. Most joined Maine or Massachusetts infantry regiments, but one in ten served the Confederacy (South). The total probably reached into two thousand as many young men had migrated to the U.S. before 1860. Pacifism, neutrality, anti-Americanism, and anti-Yankee sentiments all operated to keep the numbers down, but on the other hand, abolitionist sentiment ran high and there were strong cash incentives besides to join the Federal army. The long tradition of emigrating out of Nova Scotia combined with a zest for adventure also attracted many young men. The most well known Nova Scotians to fight in the war effort are Charles Robinson (Medal of Honor), Joseph B. Noil, Robert Knox Sneden, Benjamin Jackson and John Taylor Wood, the latter becoming a naturalized citizen after the war. Three Black Nova Scotians served in the famous 54th Regiment Massachusetts Volunteer Infantry, Hammel Gilyer, Samuel Hazzard, and Thomas Page.

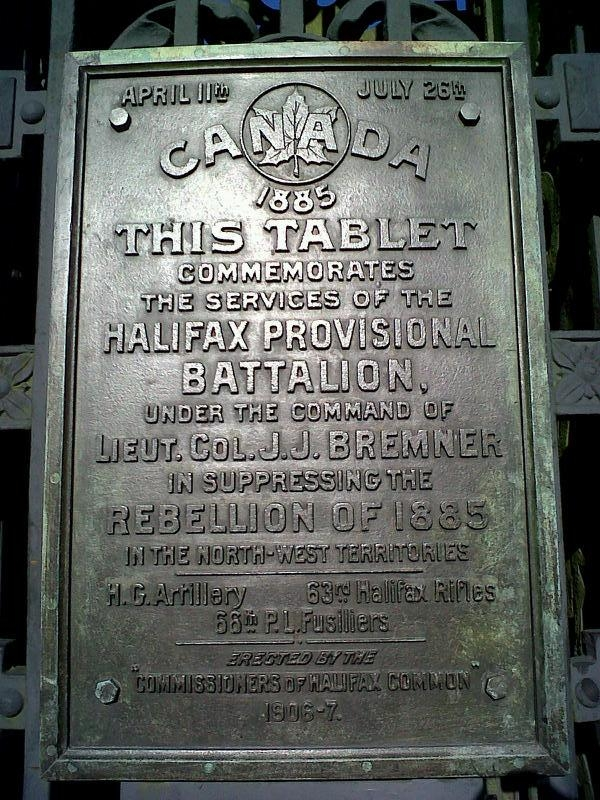
Plaque to James J. Bremner and the Halifax Provisional Battalion Plaque, Main Gate, Halifax Public Gardens, Halifax, Nova Scotia

The British Empire (including Nova Scotia) declared neutrality, and Nova Scotia prospered greatly from trade with the North. Nova Scotia was the site of two minor international incidents during the war: the Chesapeake Affair and the escape from Halifax Harbour of the CSS Tallahassee, aided by Confederate sympathizers. Nova Scotia became a haven for Confederate Secret Service agents and supporters and had a role in engaging in blockade running with arms largely from Britain. Blockade runners stopped in Halifax to rest and refuel where they were to pass through the Union blockade to deliver supplies to the Confederate Army. Nova Scotia's role in arms trafficking to the South was so noticeable that the Acadian Recorder in 1864 described Halifax's effort as a "mercenary aid to a fratricidal war, which, without outside intervention, would have long ago ended." U.S. Secretary of State William H. Seward complained on March 14, 1865:

Halifax has been for more than one year, and yet is, a naval station for vessels which, running the blockade, furnish supplies and munitions of war to our enemy, and it has been made a rendezvous for those piratical cruisers which come out from Liverpool and Glasgow, to destroy our commerce on the high seas, and even to carry war into the ports of the United States. Halifax is a postal and despatch station in the correspondence between the rebels at Richmond and their emissaries in Europe. Halifax merchants are known to have surreptitiously imported provisions, arms, and ammunition from our seaports, and then transshipped them to the rebels. The governor of Nova Scotia has been neutral, just, and friendly; so were the judges of the province who presided on the trial of the Chesapeake. But then it is understood that, on the other hand, merchant shippers of Halifax, and many of the people of Halifax, are willing agents and abettors of the enemies of the United States, and their hostility has proved not merely offensive but deeply injurious.

The war left many fearful that the North might attempt to annex British North America, particularly after the Fenian raids began (many Americans considered the Fenian raids as retribution against British-Canadian tolerance of and even aid to Confederate Secret Service activities in Canada against the Union during the Civil War (such as the Chesapeake Affair and the St. Albans Raid). In response, volunteer regiments were raised across Nova Scotia. British commander and Lt Governor of Nova Scotia Charles Hastings Doyle (after whom Port Hastings is named) led 700 troops out of Halifax to defeat a Fenian attack on the New Brunswick border with Maine. This rather baseless scare was one of the main reasons why Britain sanctioned the creation of Canada (1867); to avoid another possible conflict with America and to leave the defence of Nova Scotia to a Canadian Government.

=== North-West Rebellion ===
The Halifax Provisional Battalion was a military unit from Nova Scotia, which was sent to fight in the North-West Rebellion in 1885. The battalion was under command of Lieut.-Colonel James J. Bremner and consisted of 168 non-commissioned officers and men of The Princess Louise Fusiliers, 100 of the 63rd Battalion Rifles, and 84 of the Halifax Garrison Artillery, with 32 officers. The battalion left Halifax under orders for the North-West on Saturday, April 11, 1885, and they stayed for almost three months.

Prior to Nova Scotia's involvement, the province remained hostile to Canada in the aftermath of how the colony was forced into Canada. The celebration that followed the Halifax Provisional Battalion's return by train across the county ignited a national patriotism in Nova Scotia. Prime Minister Robert Borden stated that "up to this time Nova Scotia hardly regarded itself as included in the Canadian Confederation.... The rebellion evoked a new spirit.... The Riel Rebellion did more to unite Nova Scotia with the rest of Canada than any event that had occurred since Confederation." Similarly, in 1907 Governor General Earl Grey declared, "This Battalion... went out Nova Scotians, they returned Canadians." The wrought iron gates at the Halifax Public Gardens were made in the Battalion's honour.

== Twentieth century ==
=== Second Boer War ===
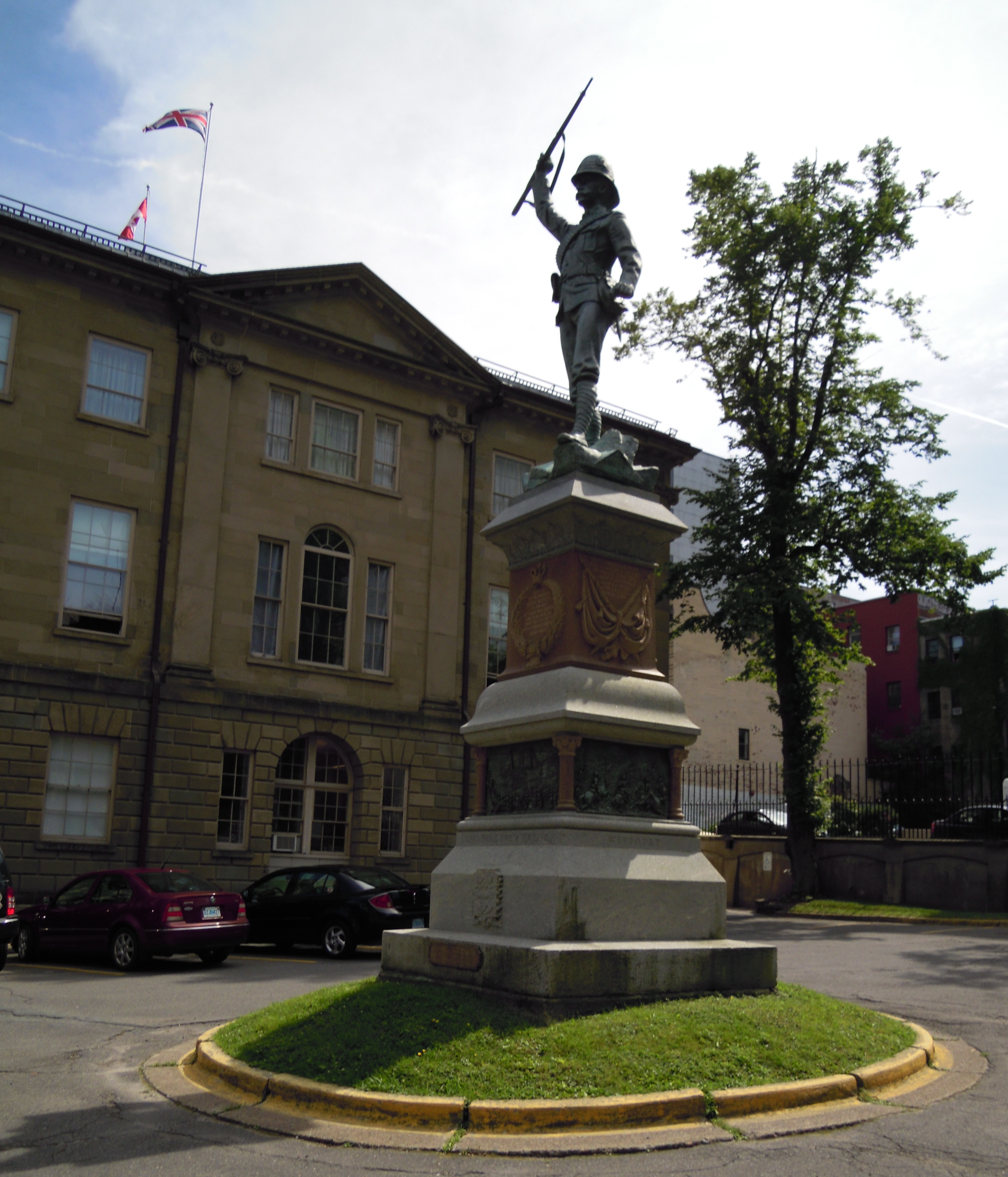
South African War Memorial (Halifax) by Hamilton MacCarthy, Province House, Nova Scotia

During the Second Boer War (1899–1902), the First Contingent was composed of seven Companies from across Canada. The Nova Scotia Company (H) consisted of 125 men. (The total First Contingent was a total force of 1,019. Eventually over 8600 Canadians served.) The mobilization of the Contingent took place at Quebec. On October 30, 1899, the ship Sardinian sailed the troops for four weeks to Cape Town. The Boer War marked the first occasion in which large contingents of Nova Scotian troops served abroad (individual Nova Scotians had served in the Crimean War). The Battle of Paardeberg in February 1900 represented the second time Canadian soldiers saw battle abroad (the first being the Canadian involvement in the Nile Expedition). Canadians also saw action at the Battle of Faber's Put on May 30, 1900. On November 7, 1900, the Royal Canadian Dragoons engaged the Boers in the Battle of Leliefontein, where they saved British guns from capture during a retreat from the banks of the Komati River. Approximately 267 Canadians died in the War. 89 men were killed in action, 135 died of disease, and the remainder died of accident or injury. 252 were wounded.

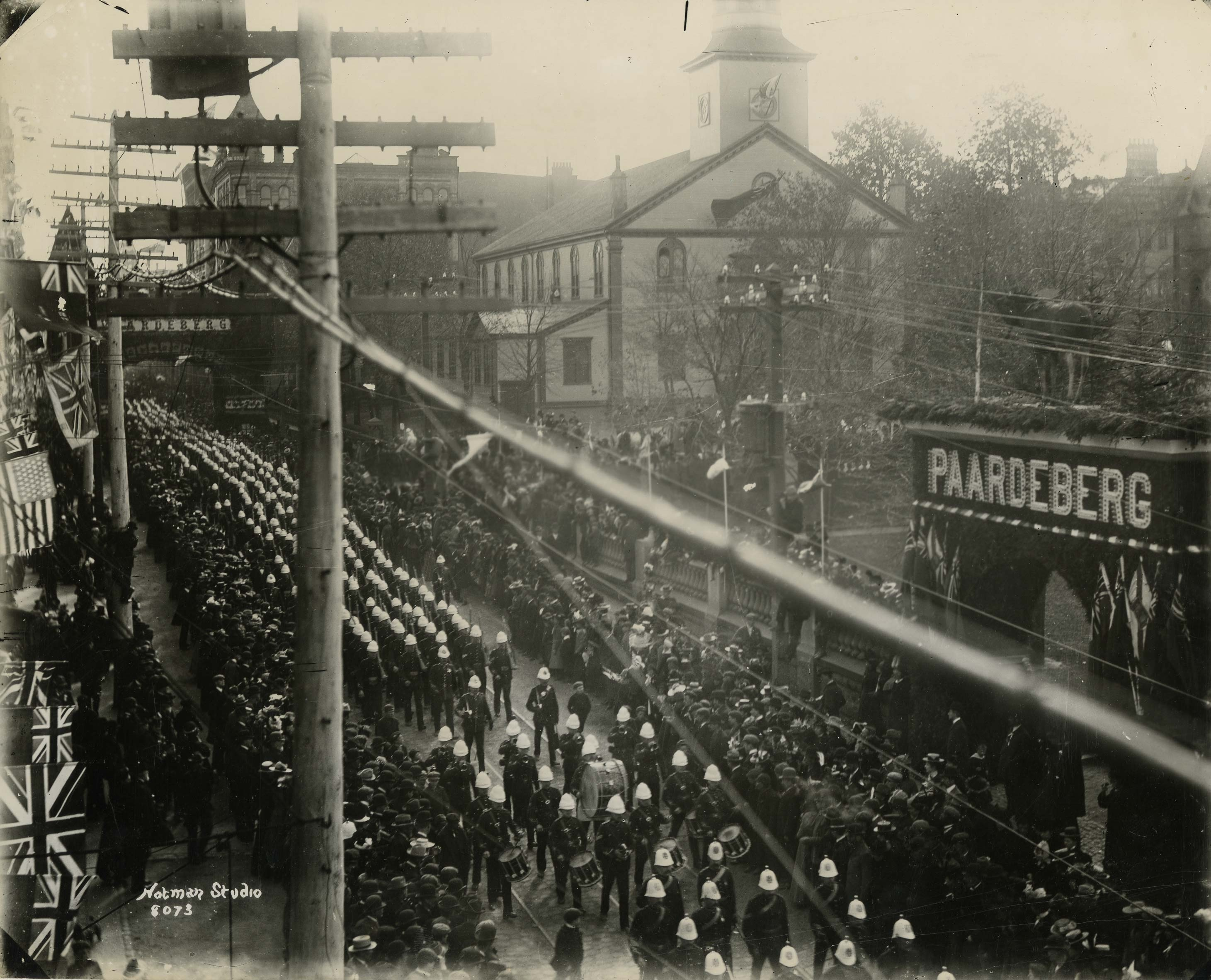
Boer War Victory Parade, Barrington Street, Halifax, Nova Scotia

Of all the Canadians who died during the war, the most famous was the young Lt. Harold Lothrop Borden of Canning, Nova Scotia. Harold Borden's father was Sir Frederick W. Borden, Canada's Minister of Militia who was a strong proponent of Canadian participation in the war. Another famous Nova Scotian casualty of the war was Charles Carroll Wood (after whom Chaswood, Nova Scotia is named), son of the renowned Confederate naval captain John Taylor Wood and the first Canadian to die in the war.

For two decades afterwards, Canadians would gather on February 27 (known in Canada as "Paardeberg Day") around memorials to the South African War to say prayers and honour veterans. This continued until the end of the First World War, when Armistice Day (later called Remembrance Day) began to be observed on November 11.

=== First World War ===
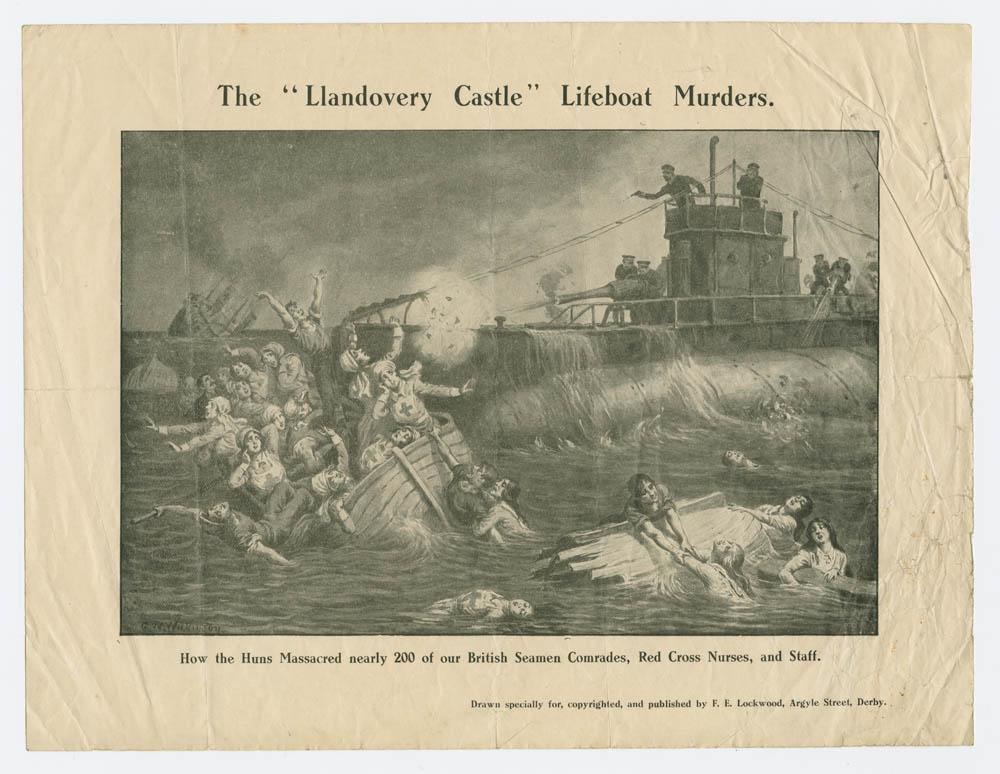
Sinking of HMHS Llandovery Castle

The prime minister of Canada during the war was Nova Scotian Robert Borden. For the war effort 39 units were raised in Nova Scotia, made up of 30,000 soldiers (the total population of Nova Scotia being 550,000).

During World War I, Halifax became a major international port and naval facility. The harbour became a major shipment point for war supplies, troop ships to Europe from Canada and the United States and hospital ships returning the wounded. These factors drove a major military, industrial and residential expansion of the city.

On 27 June 1917, a German U-boat torpedoed a hospital ship from the port of Halifax named HMHS Llandovery Castle. Escaping lifeboats were pursued and sunk by the U-boat and the survivors machine-gunned. Of the crew totalling 258, only twenty-four survived. The commander of the ship, Lt.-Col. Thomas Howard MacDonald, was from Nova Scotia as was the nursing Matron, Margaret Marjory Fraser (daughter of Lt. Governor of Nova Scotia Duncan Cameron Fraser). Lt.-Col MacDonald died as did Fraser along with the 13 nurses under her command.

On Thursday, December 6, 1917, the city of Halifax, Nova Scotia, Canada, was devastated by the huge detonation of a French cargo ship, fully loaded with wartime explosives, that had accidentally collided with a Norwegian ship in "The Narrows" section of the Halifax Harbour. Approximately 2,000 people (mostly Canadians) were killed by debris, fires, or collapsed buildings, and it is estimated that over 9,000 people were injured. This is still the world's largest man-made accidental explosion.

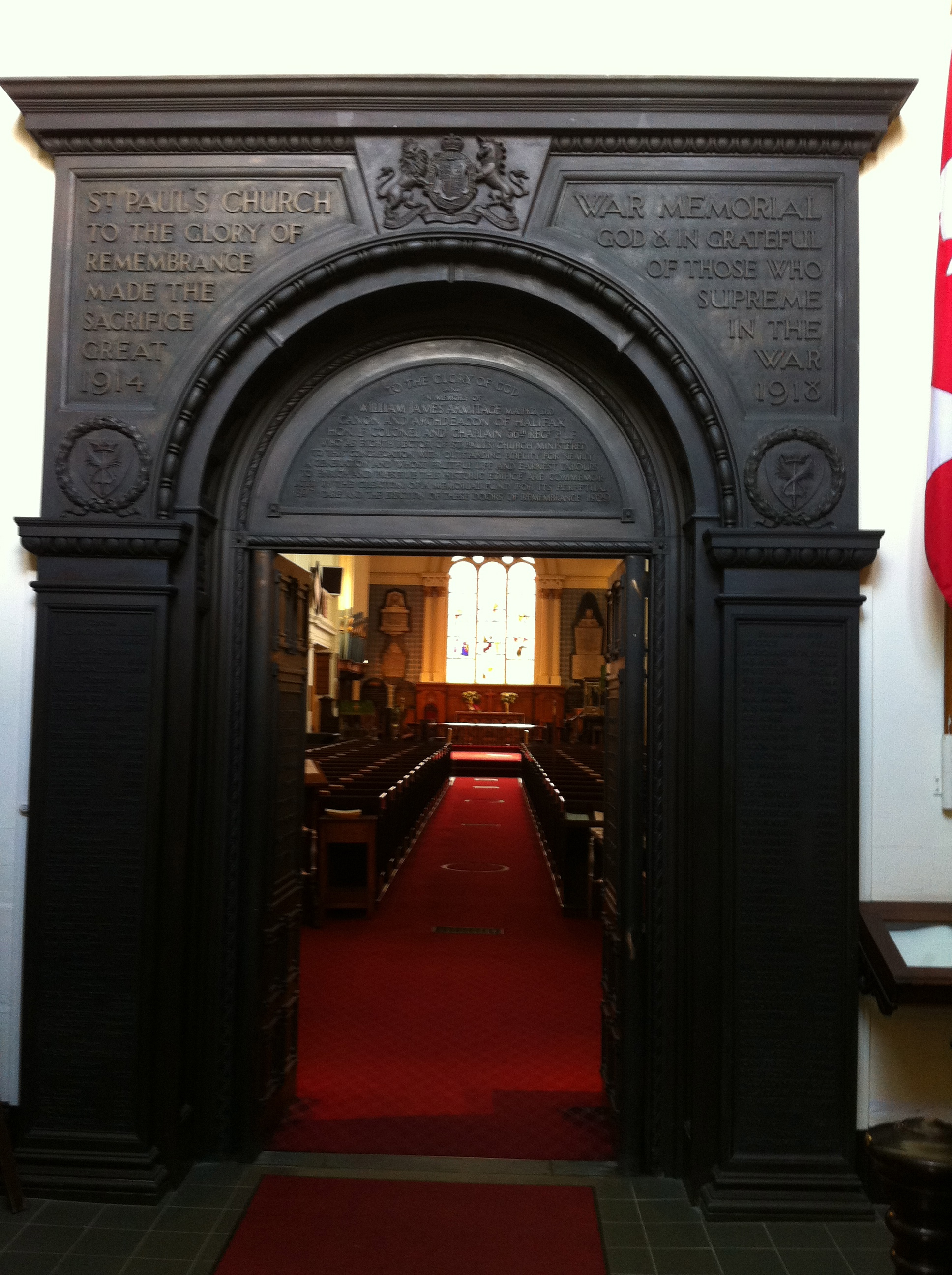
WW1 Doorway Arch - engraved with names of Nova Scotians who died, St. Paul's Church (Halifax)

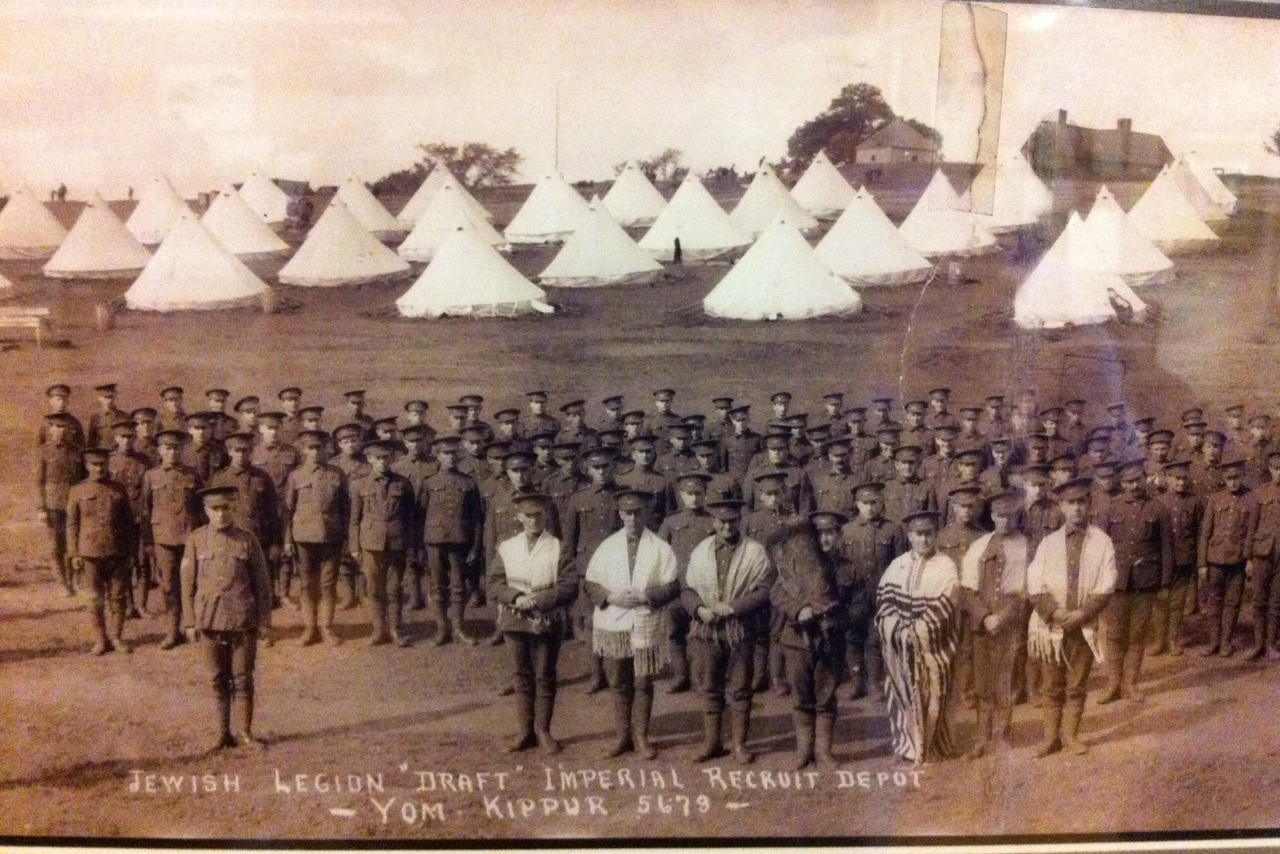
Jewish Legion, Fort Edward (Nova Scotia), (Yom Kippur, 1918)

Founders of the League of Nations included David Ben-Gurion, who became the first prime minister of Israel, and Ze'ev Jabotinsky; both men were trained at Fort Edward. At age 70, David Ben-Gurion reported on his time at Fort Edward: "I will never forget Windsor where I received my first training as a soldier and where I became a corporal."

The Amherst Internment Camp was one of three internment camps in the province. It existed from 1914 to 1919 in Amherst, Nova Scotia. It was the largest POW camp in Canada during World War I; a maximum of 853 prisoners were housed at one time at the old Malleable Iron foundry on the corner of Hickman and Park Streets. The most famous prisoner of war at the camp was Leon Trotsky.

Three Nova Scotian battalions saw combat in Europe as distinct fighting units – The Royal Canadian Regiment, 85th Battalion and 25th Battalion. The Royal Canadian Regiment, based in Halifax, was the only unit in existence at the time of the war's outbreak.

The 36th Battery, Canadian Field Artillery, was raised out of Sydney, Cape Breton in September 1915 by Major Walter Crowe, a prominent lawyer and former mayor of Sydney.

The No. 2 Construction Battalion, Canadian Expeditionary Force (CEF), was the only predominantly black battalion in Canadian military history and also the only Canadian Battalion composed of black soldiers to serve in World War I. The battalion was raised in Nova Scotia. 56% of the battalion was from Nova Scotia (500 soldiers). (An earlier black military unit in Nova Scotia was the Victoria Rifles (Nova Scotia).)

=== Spanish Civil War ===
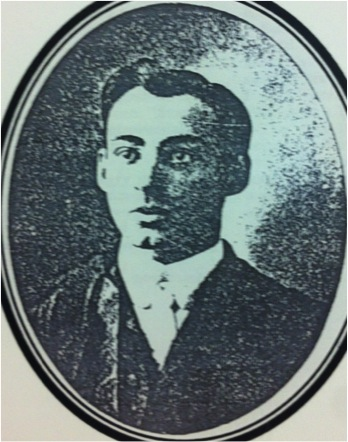
Roy Leitch, Veteran of Spanish Civil War

The Communist Party of Canada (which included Dr. Norman Bethune) had a significant recruitment effort in Nova Scotia for the Mackenzie-Papineau Battalion to fight against the rebel Nationalists (which they presented as ‘fascist’) in the Spanish Civil War. Joining the Battalion was illegal under Canadian law. Despite this, there were 31 volunteers from the Maritimes, 19 from Nova Scotia. (1500 volunteers were recruited across the country and half of them were killed in the defeat.) Perhaps the best known Nova Scotian in the war was rhodes scholar and Dalhousie University professor Roy Leitch who settled in Spryfield, Nova Scotia after the war. He later published the controversial newspaper "The Storm". From 3–18, February 1939, 421 returning soldiers of the Battalion disembarked at Halifax. The last Nova Scotian veteran of the "Mac-Paps" died in the 1980s. The Canadian Government has always denied official recognition of these veterans.

=== Second World War ===
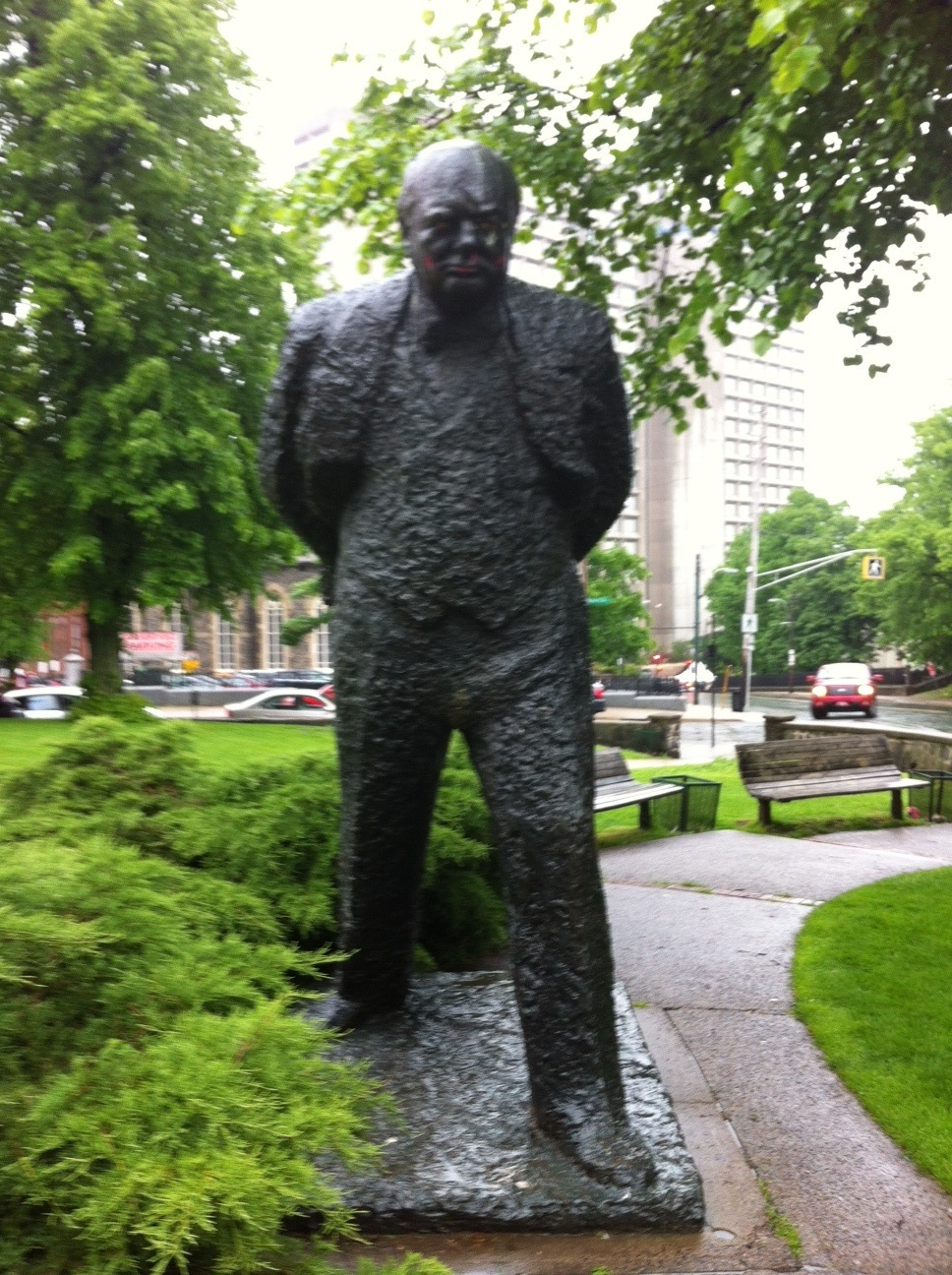
Winston Churchill by Oscar Nemon, Halifax, Nova Scotia

During World War II, thousands of Nova Scotians went overseas. One Nova Scotian, Mona Louise Parsons, joined the Dutch resistance and was eventually captured and imprisoned by the Nazis for almost four years. Another Nova Scotian, William M. Jones was part of the resistance movement in Yugoslavia.

From the start of the war in 1939 until VE Day, several of Canada's Atlantic coast ports became important to the resupply effort for the United Kingdom and later for the Allied land offensive on the Western Front. Halifax and Sydney, Nova Scotia became the primary convoy assembly ports, with Halifax being assigned the fast or priority convoys (largely troops and essential material) with the more modern merchant ships, while Sydney was given slow convoys which conveyed bulkier material on older and more vulnerable merchant ships. The Halifax convoys were coded HX (e.g., Convoy HX 84), and absorbed the BHX coded convoys from Bermuda before crossing the Atlantic. Both ports were heavily fortified with shore radar emplacements, search light batteries, and extensive coastal artillery stations all manned by RCN and Canadian Army regular and reserve personnel. Military intelligence agents enforced strict blackouts throughout the areas and anti-torpedo nets were in place at the harbor entrances. Despite the fact that no landings of German personnel took place near these ports, there were frequent attacks by U-boats on convoys departing for Europe. Less extensively used, but no less important, was the port of Saint John which also saw matériel funneled through the port, largely after the United States entered the war in December 1941. The Canadian Pacific Railway mainline from central Canada (which crossed the state of Maine) could be used to transport in aid of the war effort.

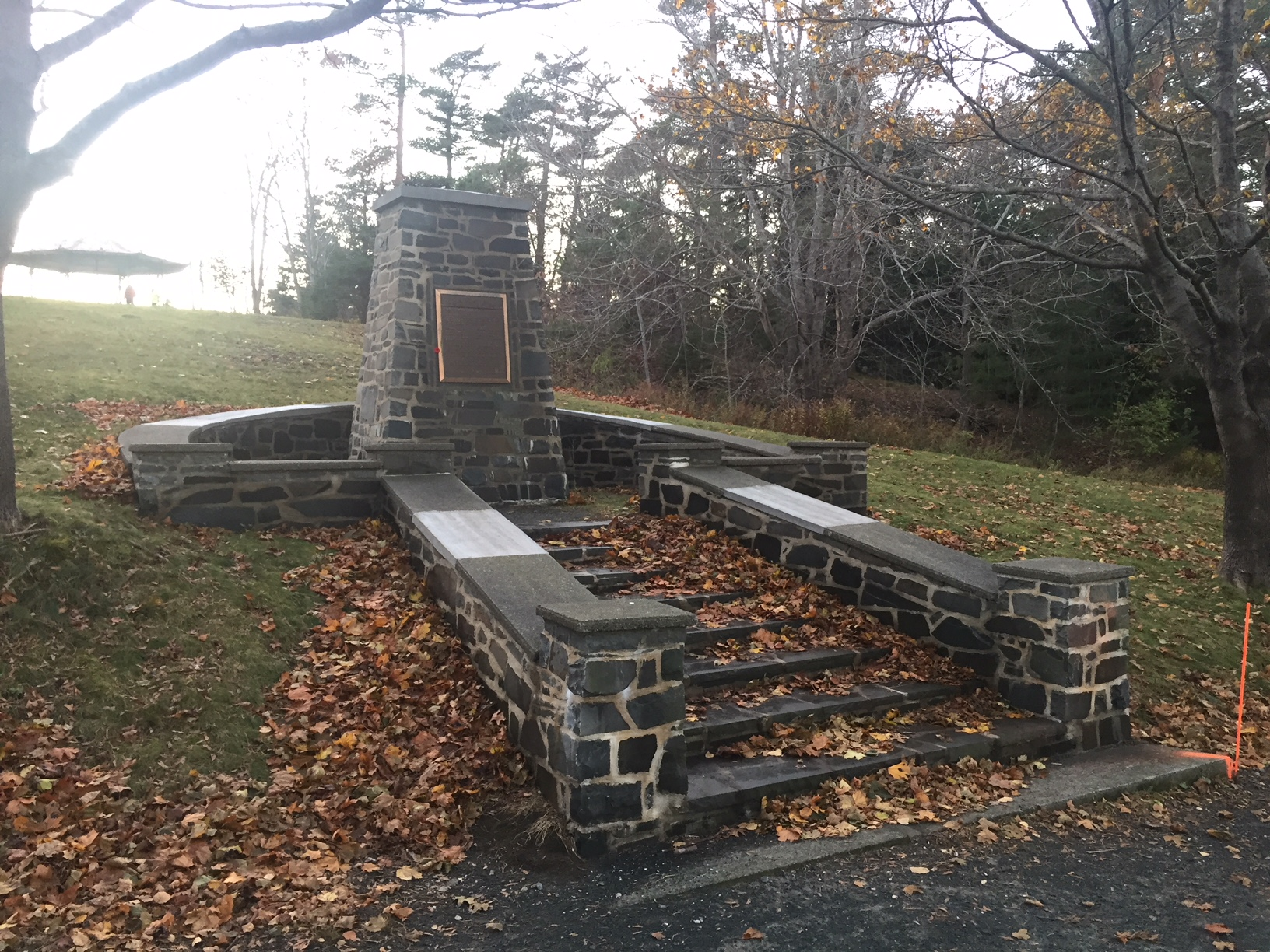
SS Point Pleasant Park Monument, Point Pleasant Park, Halifax, Nova Scotia, Canada

Although not crippling to the Canadian war effort, given the country's rail network to the east coast ports, but possibly more destructive to the morale of the Canadian public, was the Battle of the St. Lawrence, when U-boats began to attack domestic coastal shipping along Canada's east coast in the St. Lawrence River and Gulf of St. Lawrence from early 1942 through to the end of the shipping season in late 1944.

SS Caribou was a Newfoundland Railway passenger ferry that ran between Port aux Basques, in the Dominion of Newfoundland, and North Sydney, Nova Scotia between 1928 and 1942. It became infamous when it was attacked and sunk by German submarine U-69 in October 1942, while traversing the Cabot Strait as part of its three weekly SPAB convoys. As a civilian vessel, it had women and children on board, and many of them were among the 137 who died. Its sinking, and large death toll, made it clear that the war had really arrived on Canada's and Newfoundland's home front, and is cited by many historians as the most significant sinking in Canadian-controlled waters during the Second World War. In the Cabot Strait, just off Cape Breton, on 25 November 1944 HMCS Shawinigan was torpedoed and sunk with all hands on board (85 crew) by U-1228.

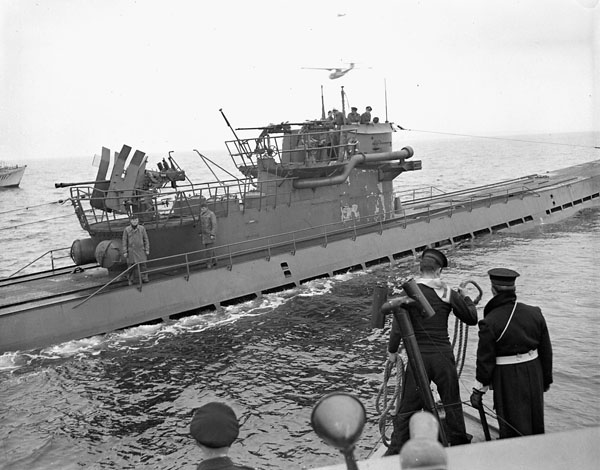
Surrender of U-889 off Shelburne, Nova Scotia, 13 May 1945.

In World War I and World War II, German submarines torpedoed a number of allied ships near Sambro Island Light. For example, in World War II, while mine sweeping near Sambro Light Vessel on 24 December 1944 while preparing to escort a convoy, HMCS Clayoquot was hit by a torpedo aft fired by U-806. She sank quickly and eight people died. A large search force was sent out to deal with the U-boat however they were not successful in finding it. In the early morning of 16 April 1945, just off Halifax harbour, U-190 sunk HMCS Esquimalt, killing 44 crew.

Several RN escorts were attached to the RCN for some months during 1942, with convoys in the St. Lawrence River and Gulf of St. Lawrence being formed between RCN facilities at HMCS Chaleur II in Quebec City, HMCS Fort Ramsay in Gaspé, and HMCS Protector in Sydney. Royal Canadian Air Force (RCAF) aircraft carried out operational patrols from RCAF stations such as Charlottetown, Summerside, Debert, Stanley and Sydney as well as various civilian fields, particularly in the Magdalen Islands.

At Camp Hill Cemetery there are 17 graves of Norwegian sailors, soldiers and merchant seamen who died in Nova Scotia during World War II. These men were at sea when Germany invaded Norway in 1940. The King and government of Norway ordered the more than 1,000 ships at sea to go to Allied ports. Camp Norway was established at Lunenburg.

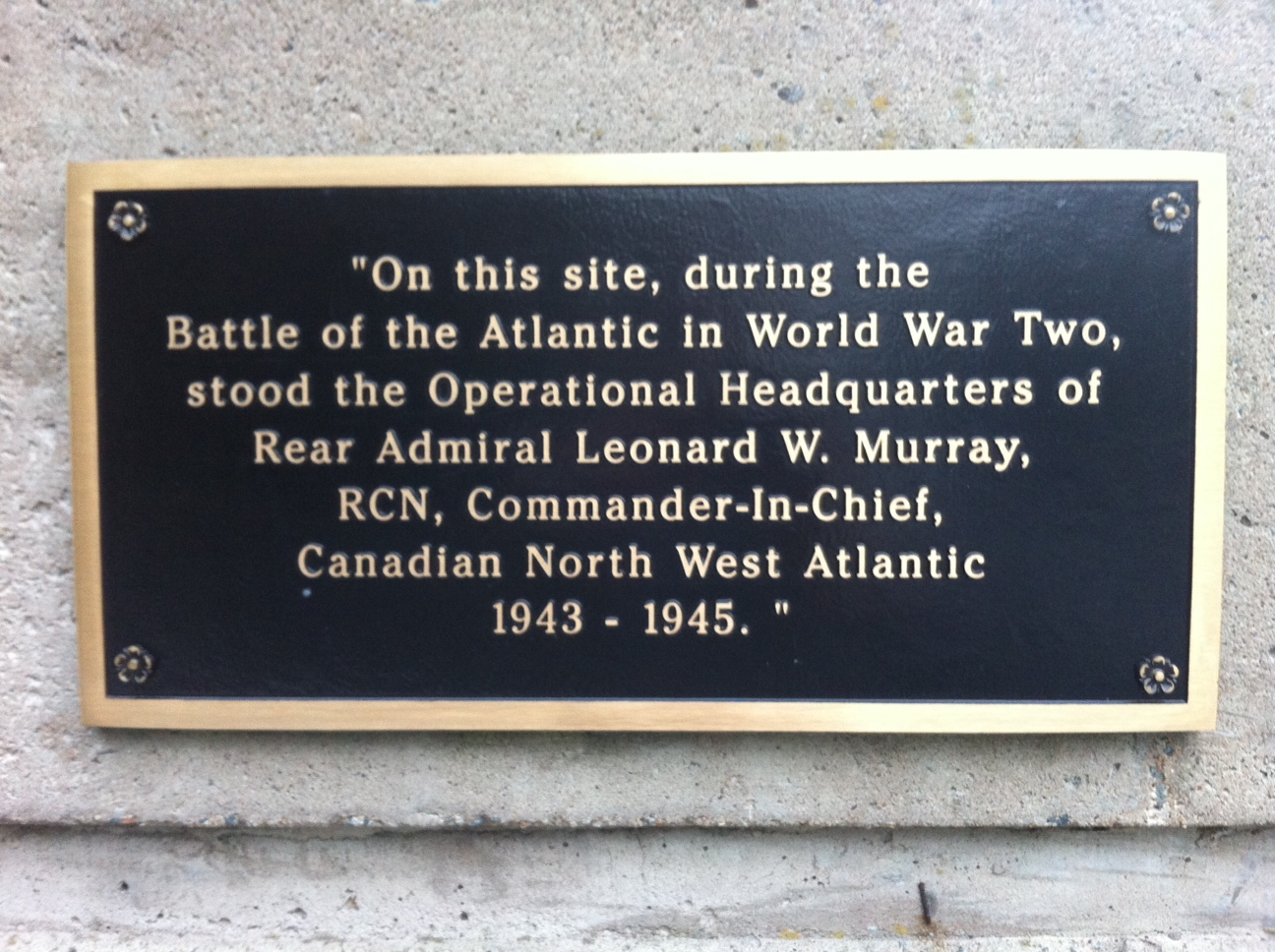
Leonard W. Murray Plaque Halifax Nova Scotia – on the corner of South St. and Barrington St

Leonard W. Murray was born at Granton, Nova Scotia on 22 June 1896. Rear Admiral Murray, CB, CBE was an officer of the Royal Canadian Navy who played a significant role in the Battle of the Atlantic. He commanded the Newfoundland Escort Force from 1941 to 1943, and from 1943 to the end of the war was Commander-in-Chief, Canadian Northwest Atlantic. He was the only Canadian to command an Allied theatre of operations during World War I or World War II. He resigned his command early as a result of the Halifax VE-Day Riot.

In May 1945, following Germany's surrender, U-889 surrendered to the RCN at Shelburne, Nova Scotia.

=== Korean War ===
During the Korean War there were 48 Nova Scotians who died in the war and more than 100 were wounded. (See Atlantic Canada Korean War Monument and Cape Breton Korean War Monument). The only Nova Scotian who was a member of the Royal Canadian Navy to die was Robert John Moore. He was killed while in an air crash. He was awarded the United Nations Service Medal (Korea) and is commemorated on the Korean War Memorial at the Naval Museum of Alberta at HMCS Tecumseh, Calgary, Alberta.

=== Afghanistan ===
There were 13 Nova Scotians among the 158 Canadians who were killed in the War in Afghanistan.

== Notable Nova Scotian military figures ==
The following list includes those who were born in Nova Scotia, Acadia and Mi'kma'ki or those who became naturalized citizens. Those who came for brief periods from other countries are not included (e.g. John Gorham, Edward Cornwallis, James Wolfe, Boishébert, Thomas Pichon, etc.)

=== 17th-18th centuries ===
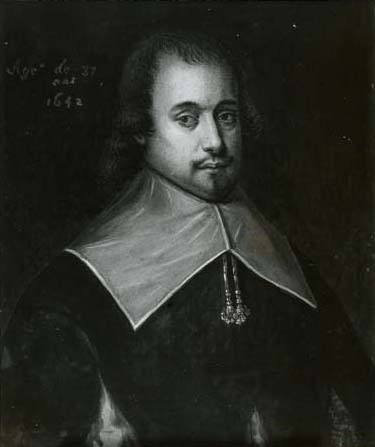
Charles de Menou d'Aulnay – Acadian Civil War

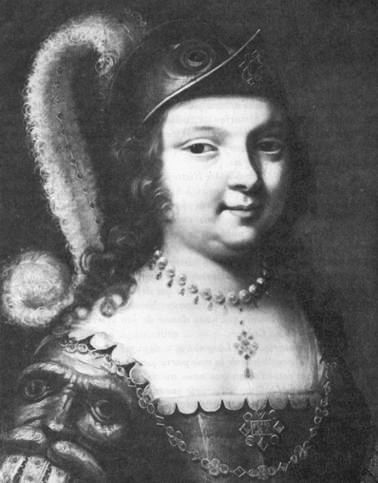
Françoise-Marie Jacquelin – Civil War in Acadia

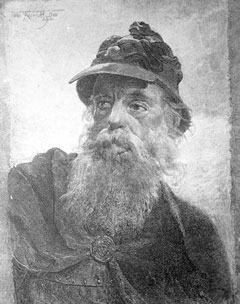
Baron de St. Castin – Castin's War

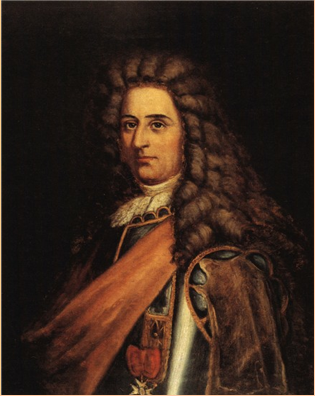
Jacques Testard de Montigny – King William's War

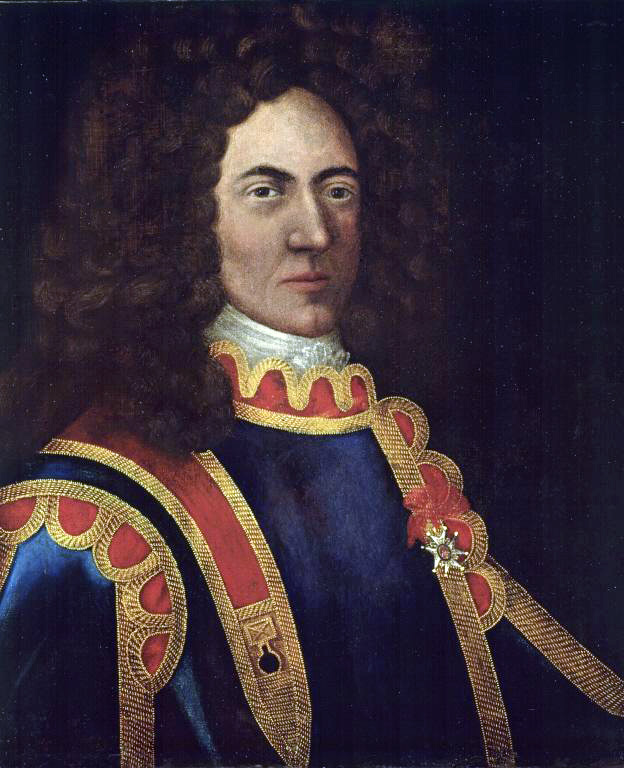
Jean-Baptiste Hertel de Rouville – Queen Anne's War

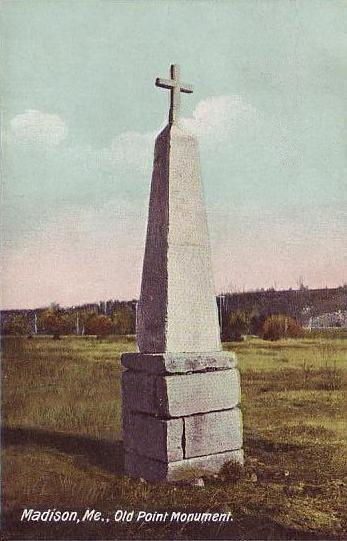
Father Sébastien Rale – Father Rale's War

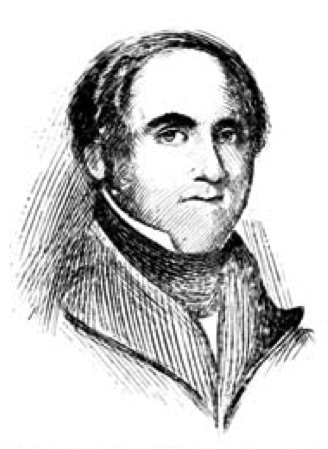
Captain Charles Morris – King George's War

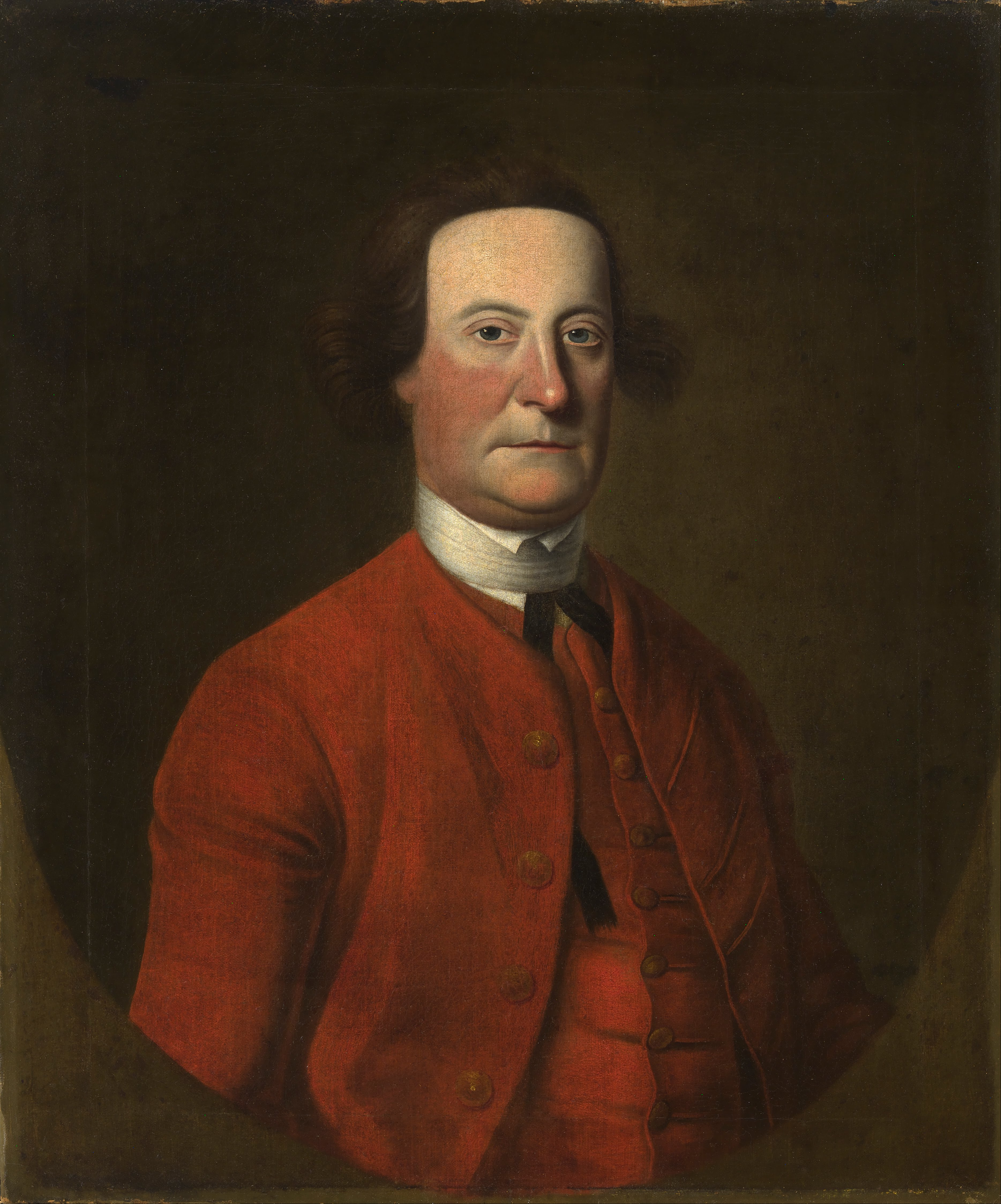
John Bradstreet – King George's War

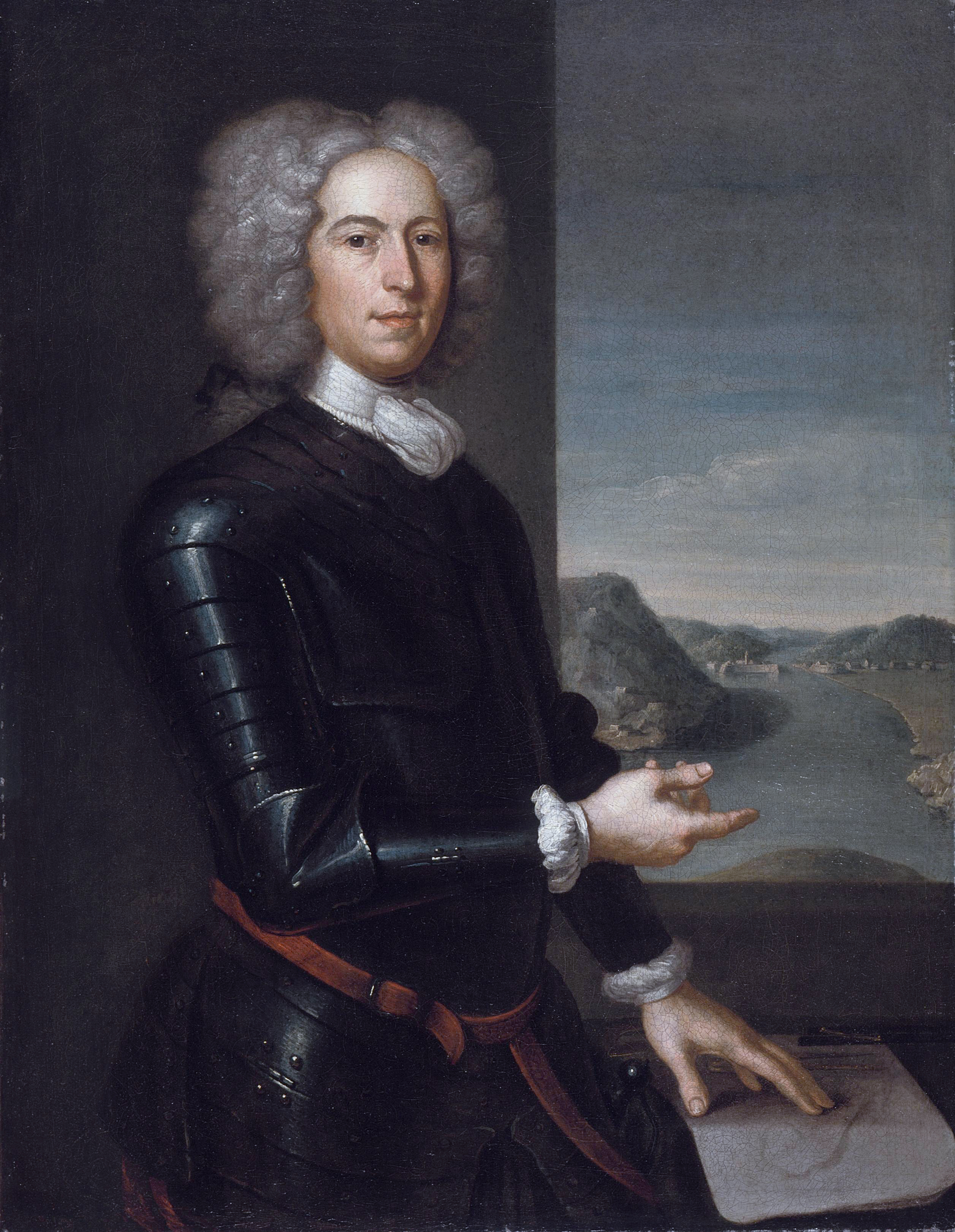
Paul Mascarene – King George's War

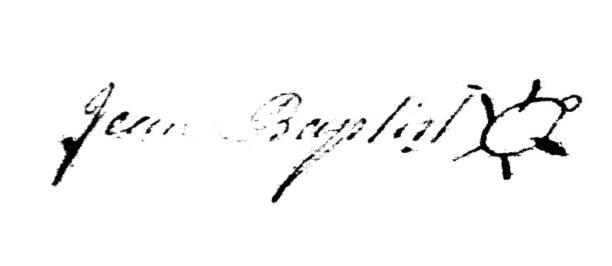
Chief Jean-Baptiste Cope – Conflicts in Nova Scotia, 1749–1755

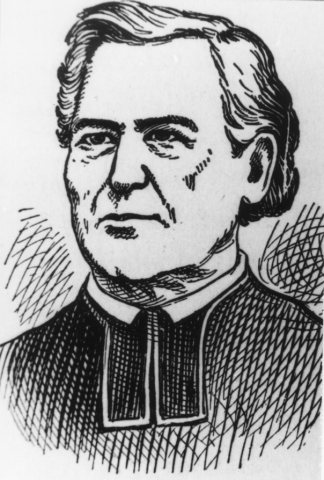
Father Jean-Louis Le Loutre – Conflicts in Nova Scotia, 1749–1755

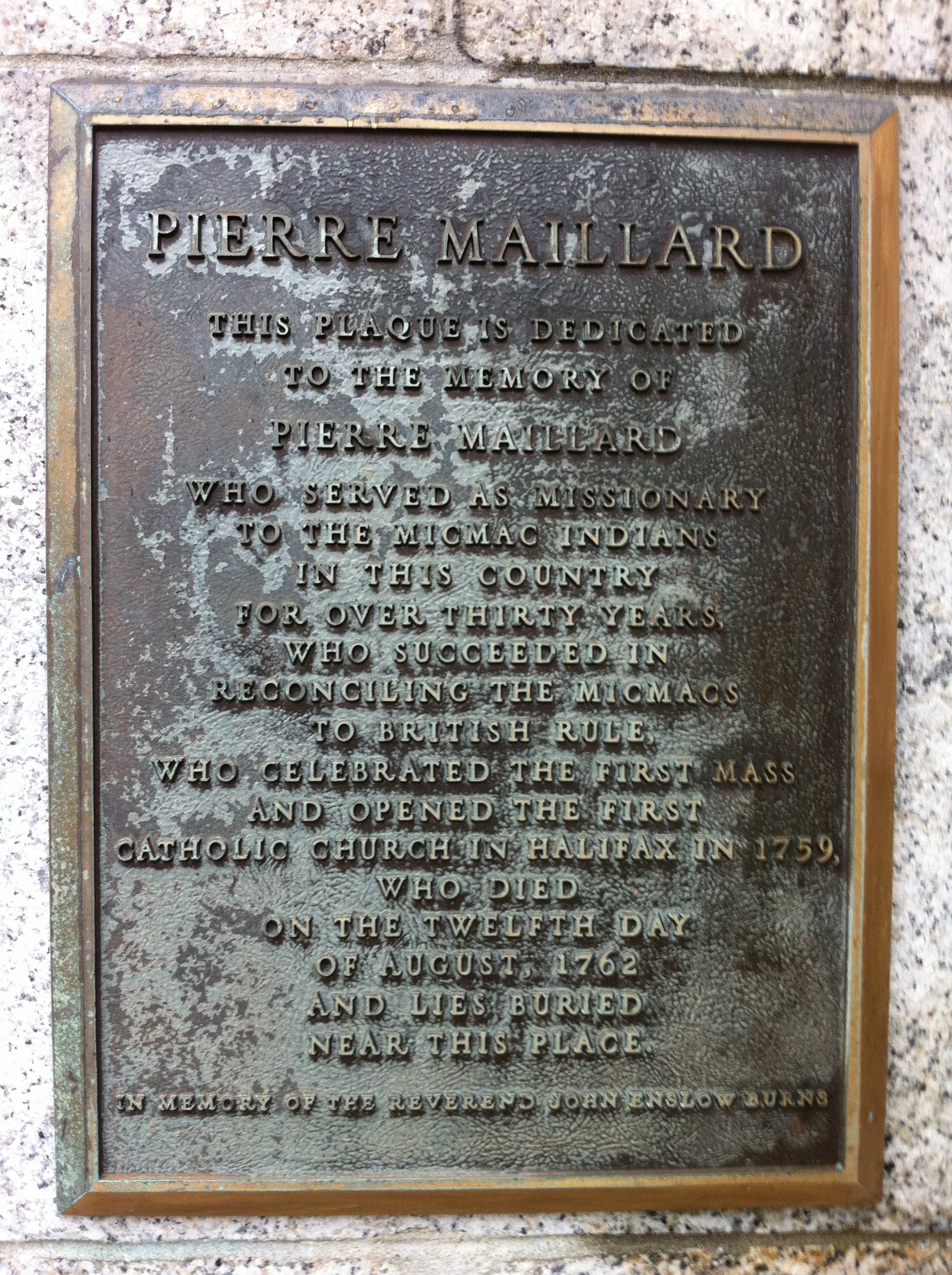
Father Pierre Maillard – Conflicts in Nova Scotia, 1749–1755

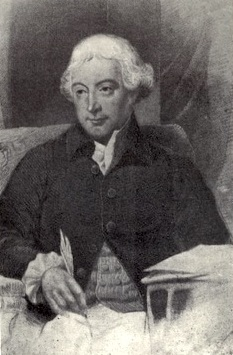
Charles Lawrence – Conflicts in Nova Scotia, 1749–1755

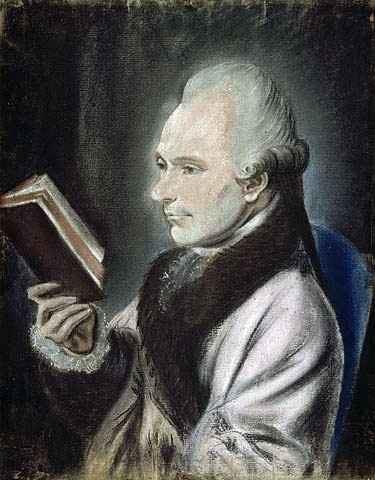
Joseph Frederick Wallet DesBarres – Seven Years' War

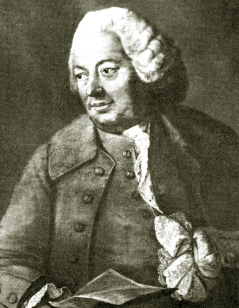
Thomas Pichon – Seven Years' War

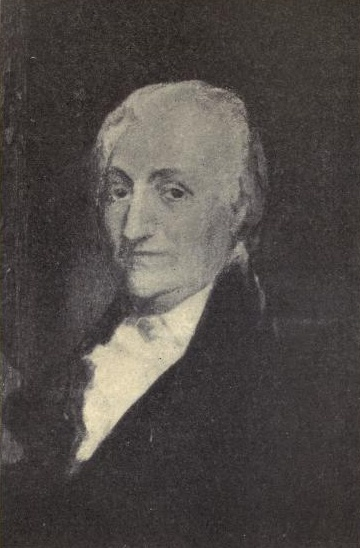
Montague Wilmot

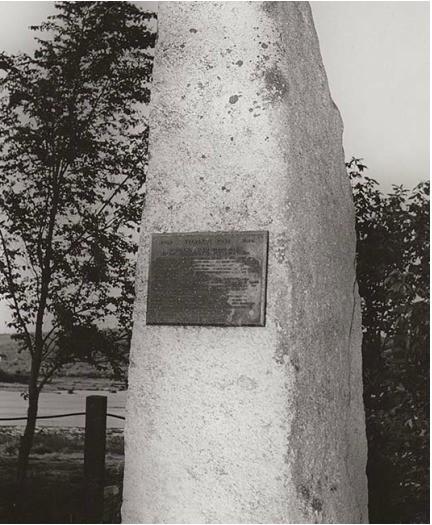
Silvanus Cobb – Seven Years' War

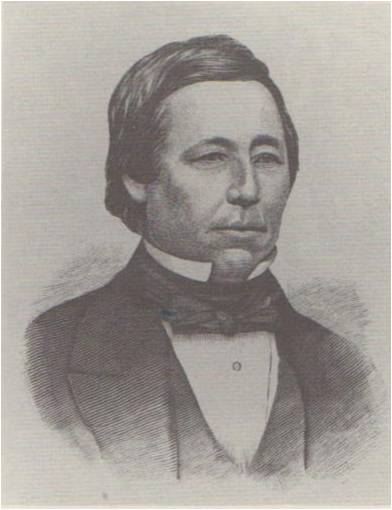
Jonathan Eddy – American Revolution

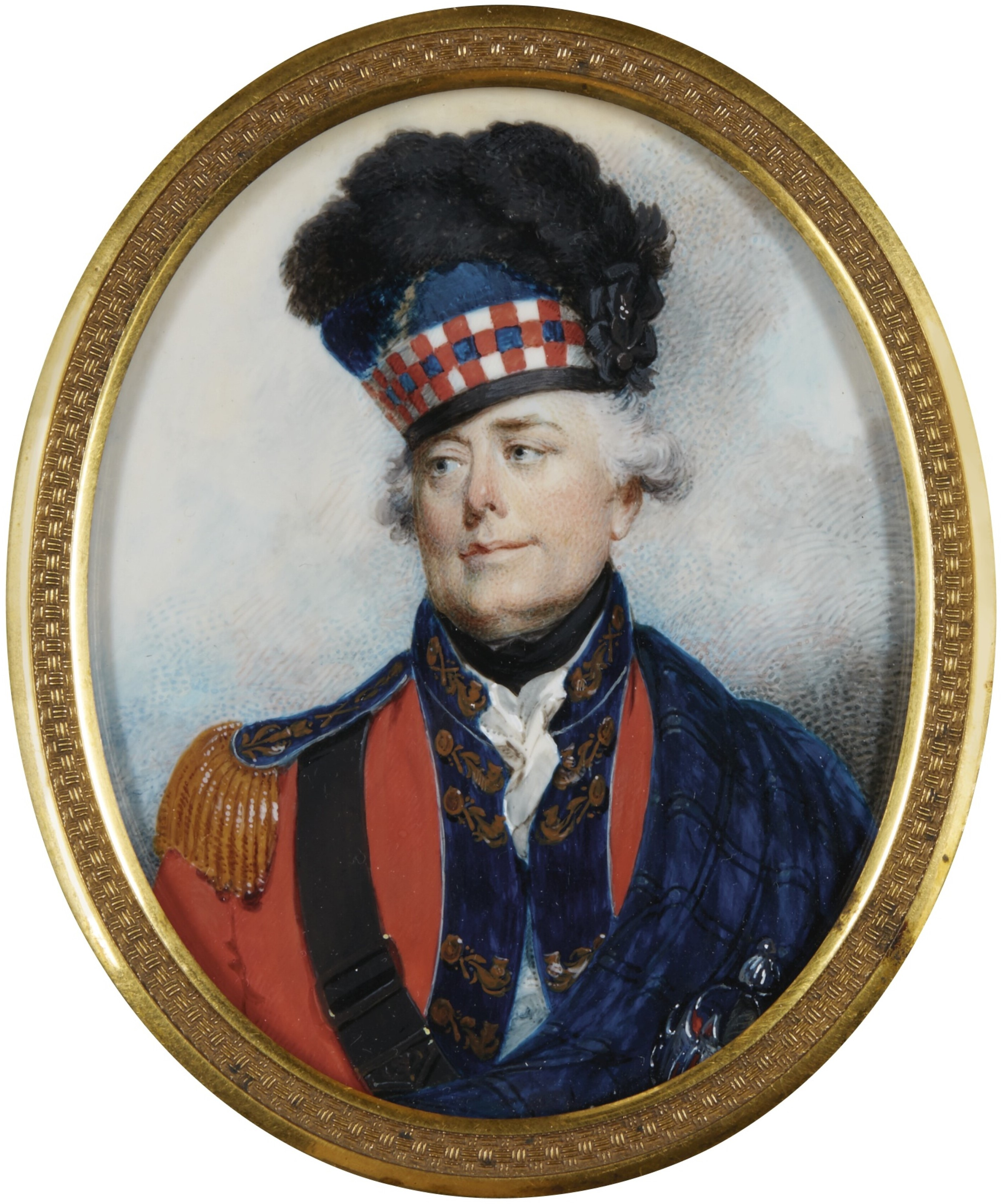
Major General John Small, Commander, 84th Regiment of Foot (Royal Highland Emigrants) – American Revolution

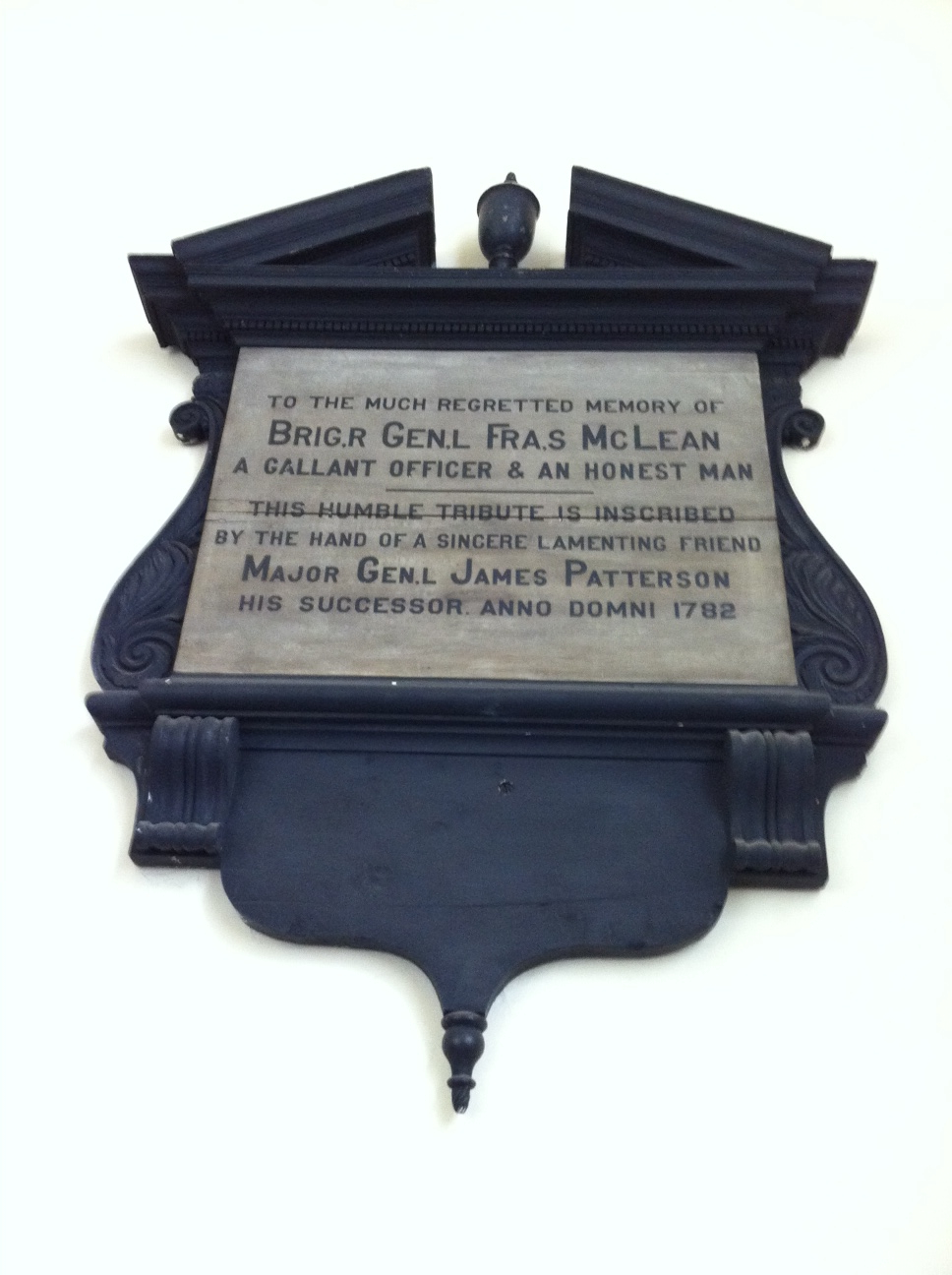
Francis McLean – American Revolution

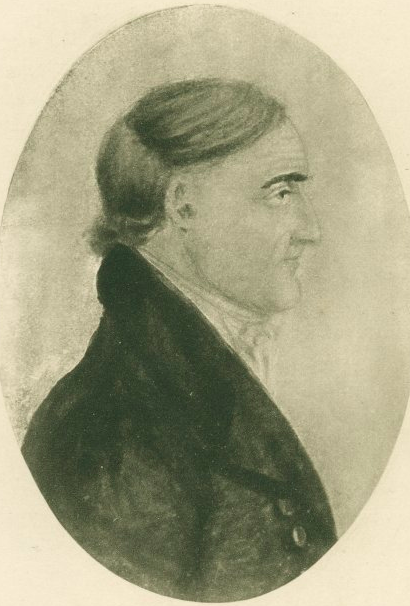
Col Simeon Perkins – American Revolution
- Charles de Saint-Étienne de la Tour – Acadian Civil War
- Chief Madockawando – King William's War
- John Gyles – King William's War
- Father Louis-Pierre Thury – King William's War
- Pierre Maisonnat dit Baptiste – Queen Anne's War
- Robert Denison – King George's War
- Joseph-Nicolas Gautier – Conflicts in Nova Scotia, 1749–1755
- Pierre II Surette – Seven Years' War
- John Allan (colonel) – American Revolution
- Benjamin Belcher – American Revolution

=== 19th century ===
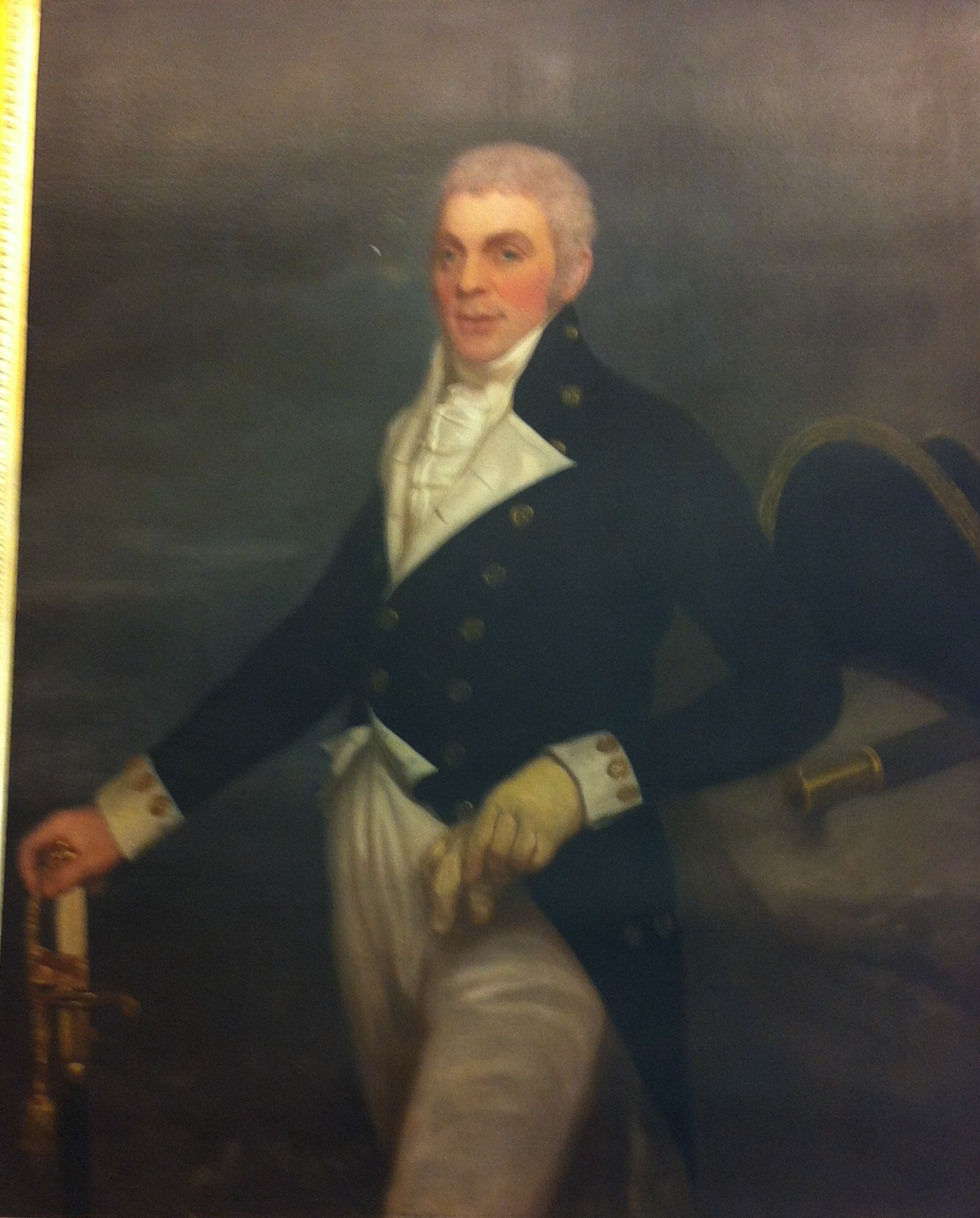
Commander John Houlton Marshall --Battle of Trafalgar, Province House (Nova Scotia)

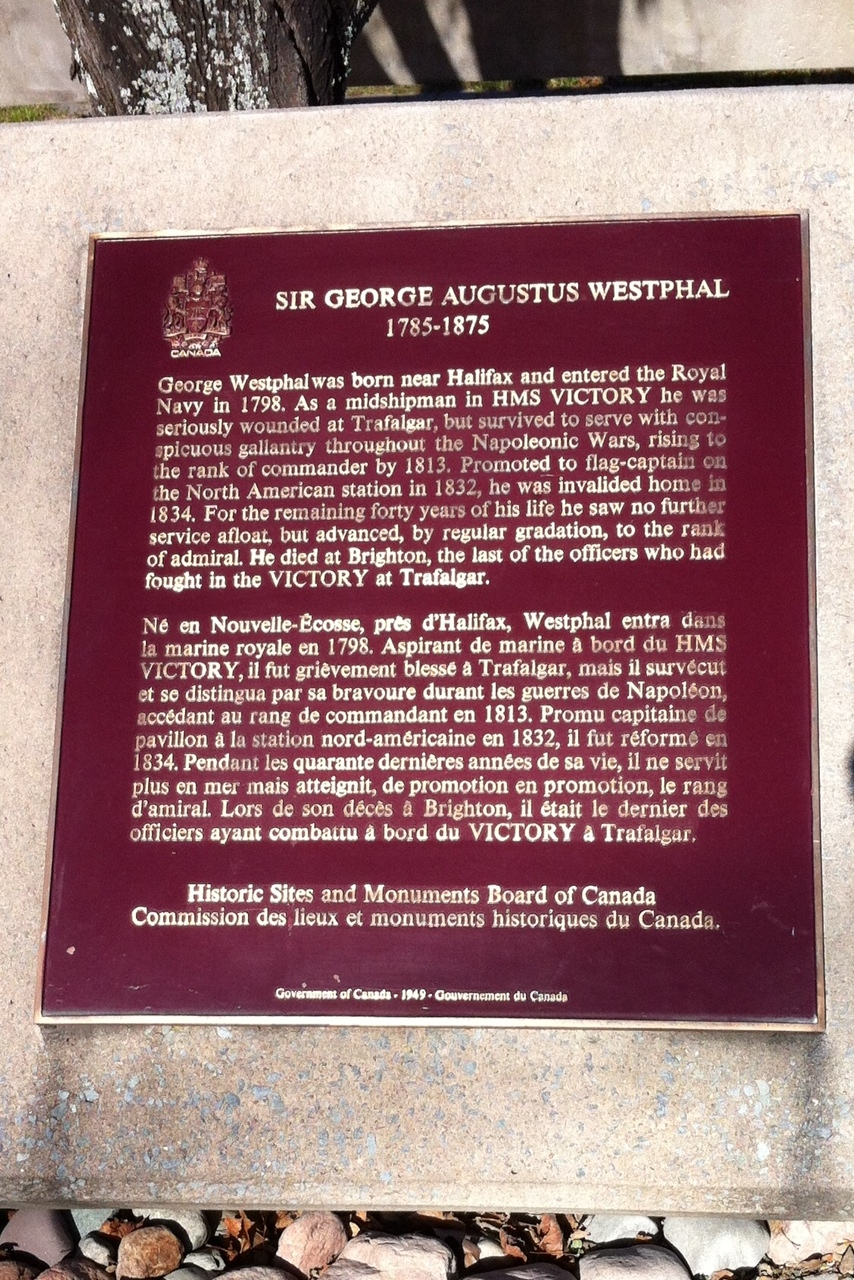
George Augustus Westphal – Battle of Trafalgar, Admiralty Garden, Stadacona, CFB Halifax, Nova Scotia

Sir John Coape Sherbrooke – Lt Gov. of Nova Scotia – War of 1812

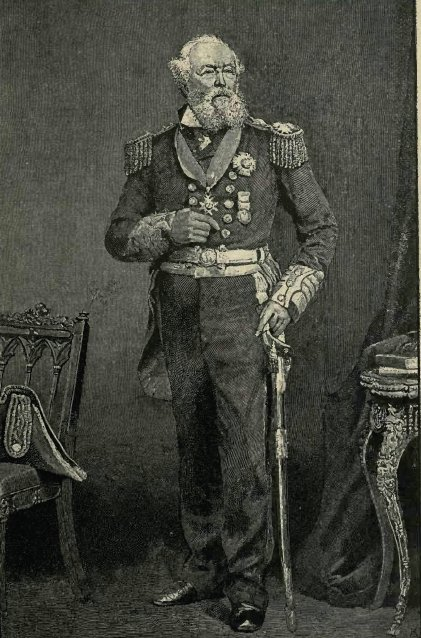
Provo Wallis – War of 1812

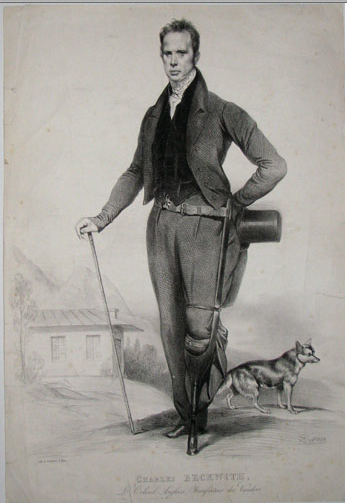
John Charles Beckwith (army officer) – Battle of Waterloo

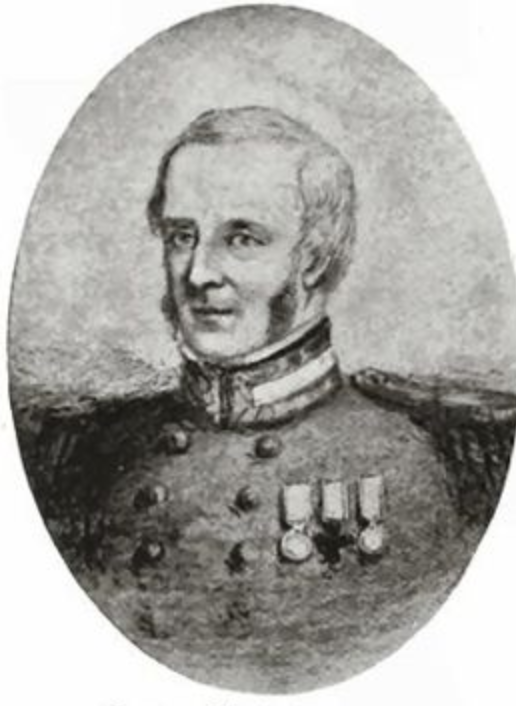
Capt. Herbert Clifford – Invasion of Isle de France

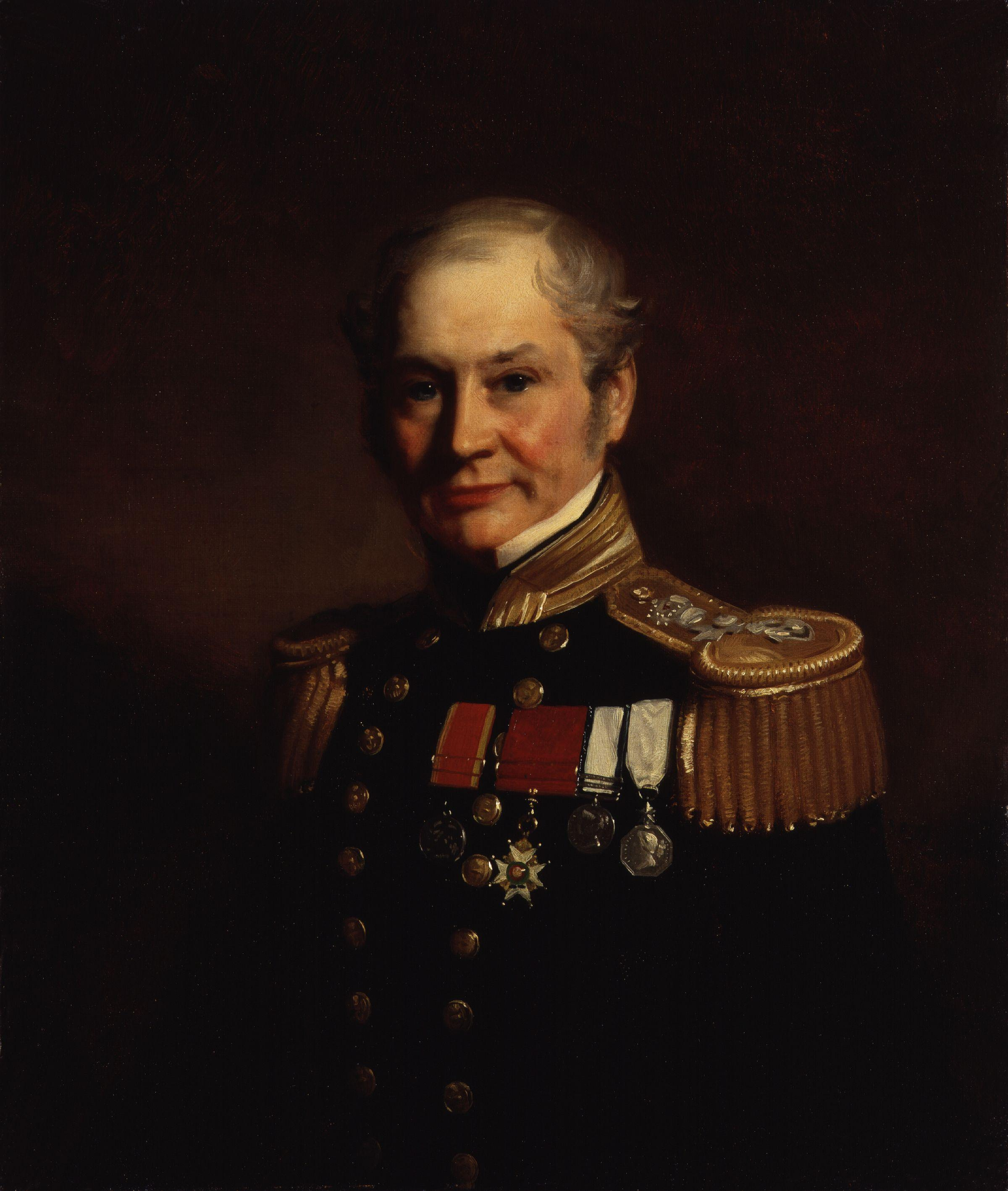
Edward Belcher – Franklin's lost expedition

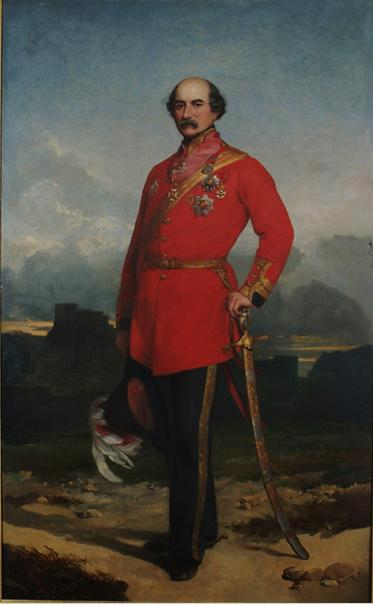
Sir William Williams, 1st Baronet, of Kars by William Gush – Crimean War

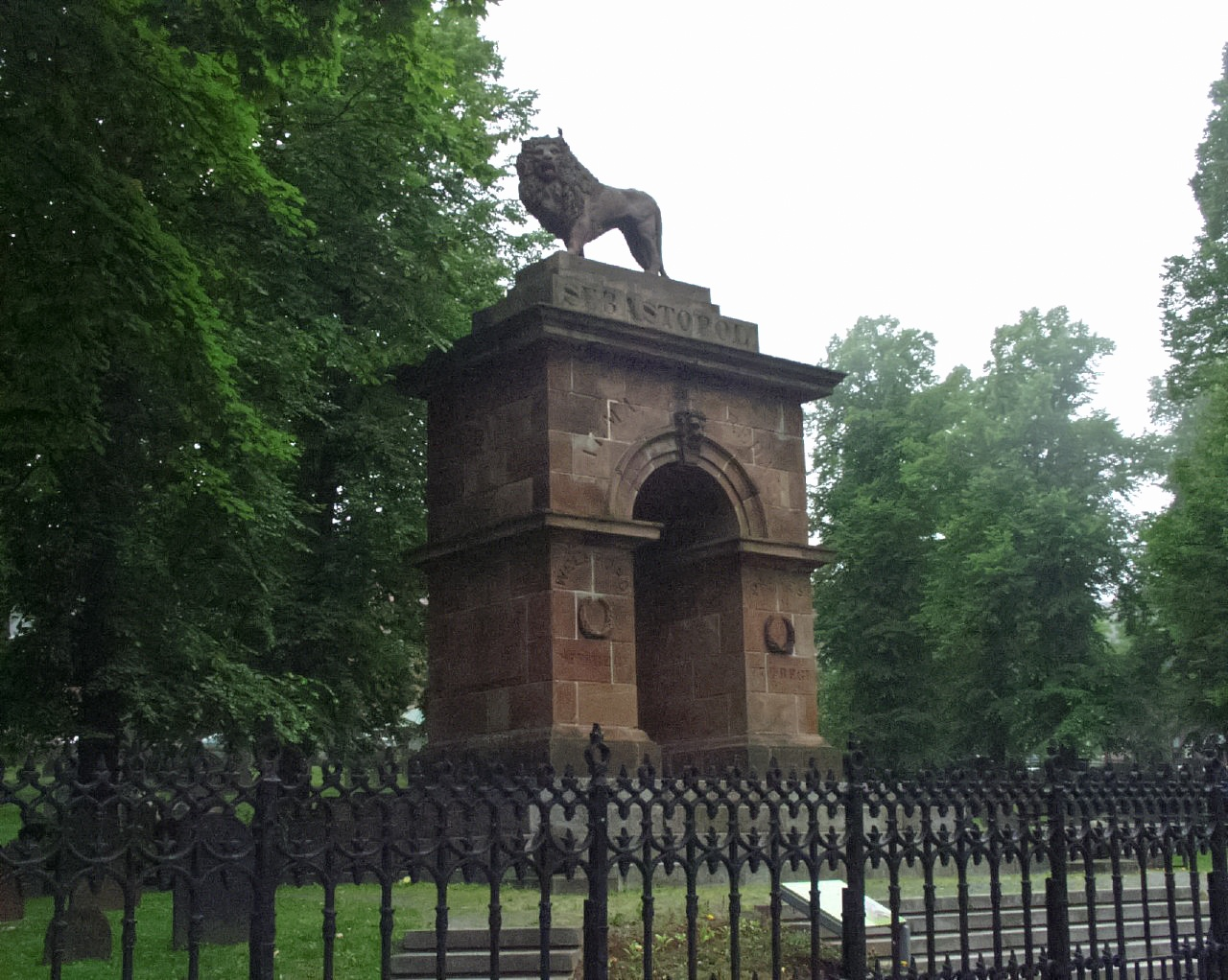
Major Augustus F. Welsford – Crimean War

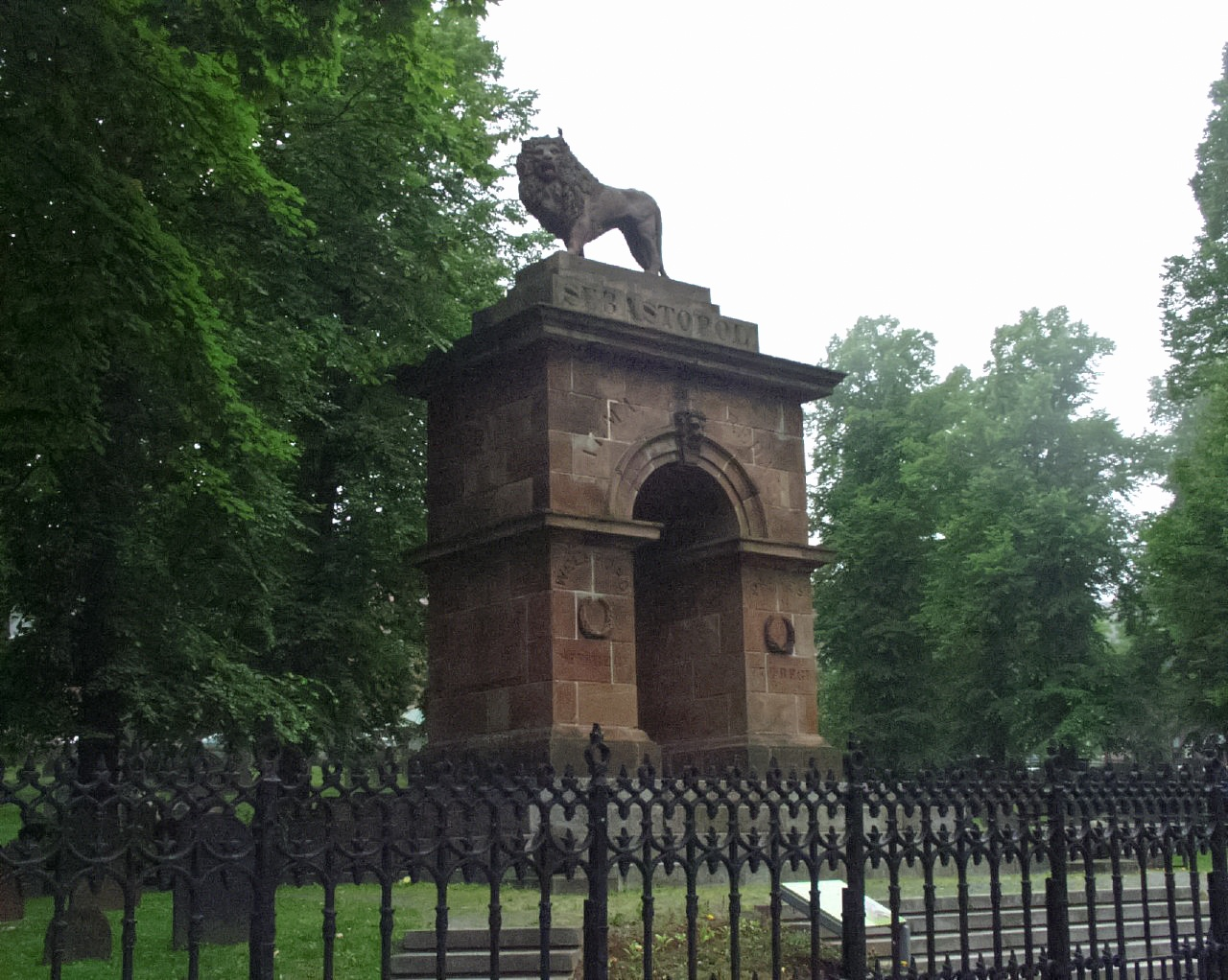
Captain William B.C.A. Parker – Crimean War

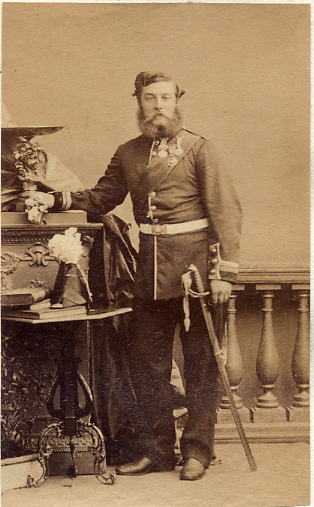
John Wimburn Laurie – Crimean War

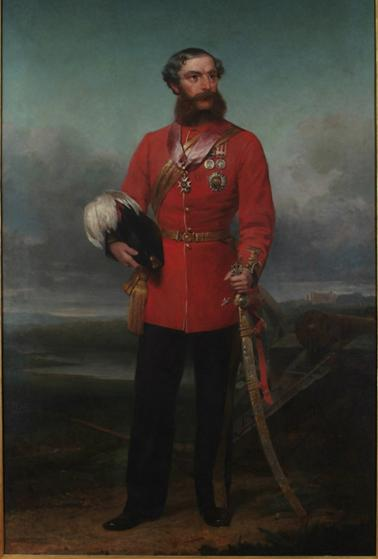
Nova Scotian Sir John Eardley Inglis by William Gush – Indian Mutiny

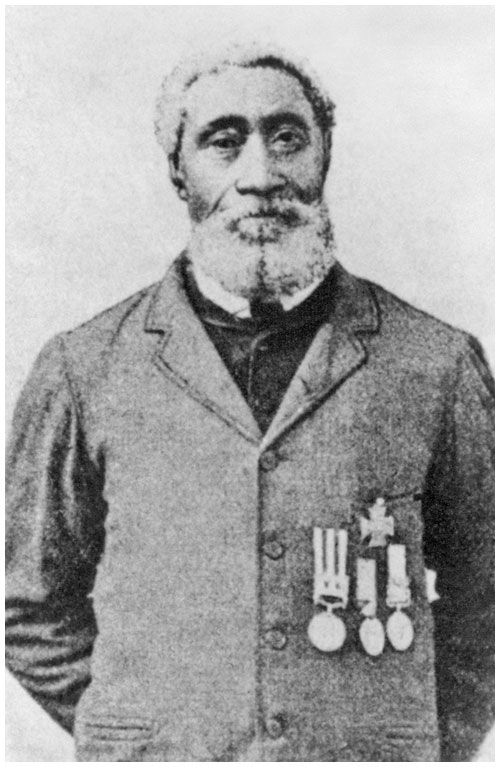
William Hall (VC) – Indian Mutiny

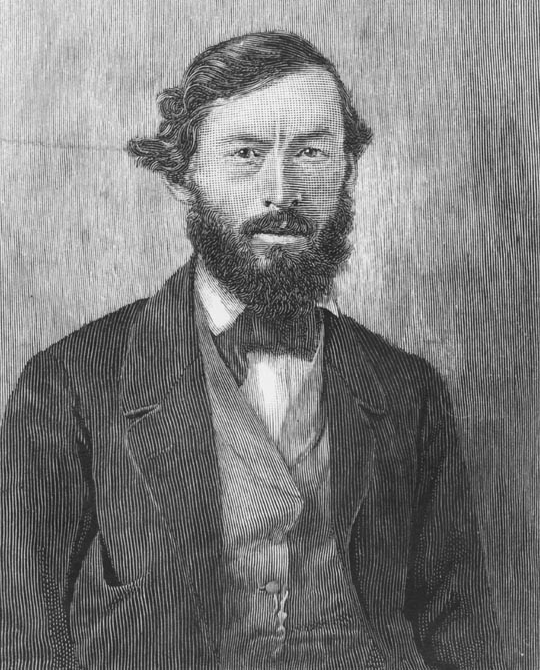
John Taylor Wood – American Civil War

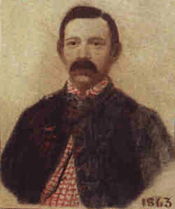
Robert Knox Sneden – American Civil War

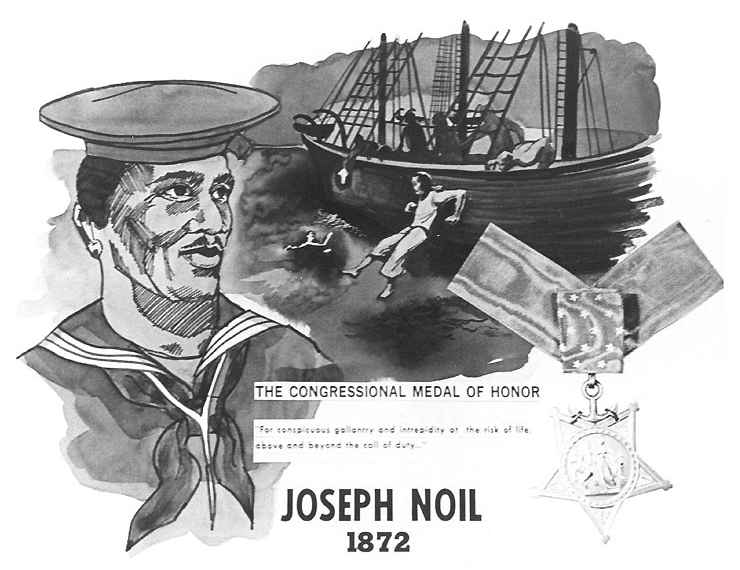
Joseph B. Noil – American Civil War

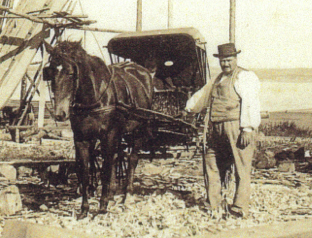
Benjamin Jackson – American Civil War

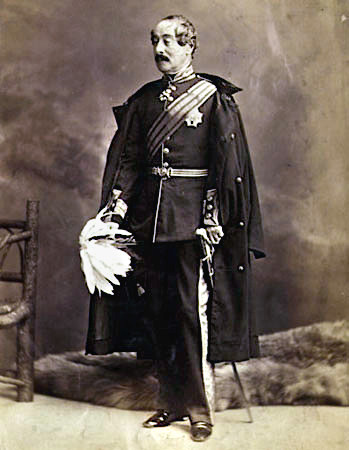
Lt Gov of Nova Scotia Charles Hastings Doyle – Fenian Raids

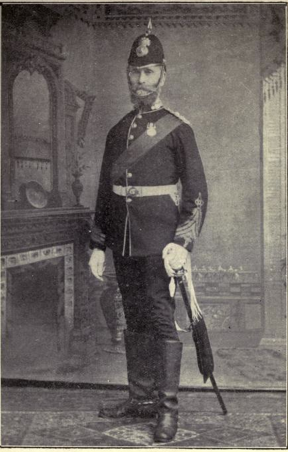
Lieutenant-Colonel James J. Bremner – North-West Rebellion

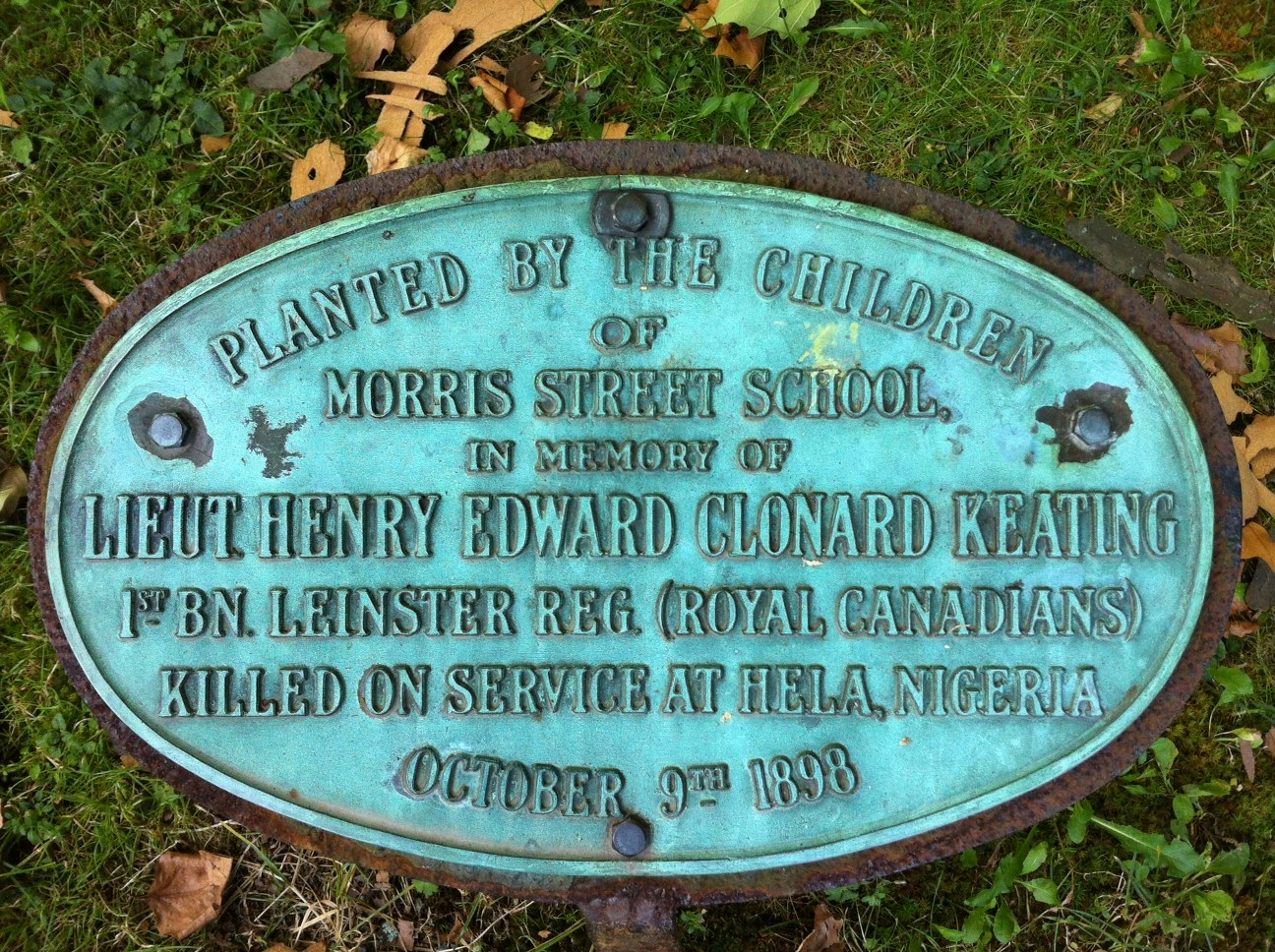
Clonard Keating – Nigeria, Plaque, Halifax Public Gardens, Nova Scotia

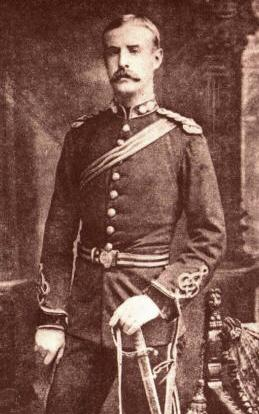
William Grant Stairs – Africa

=== 20th century ===
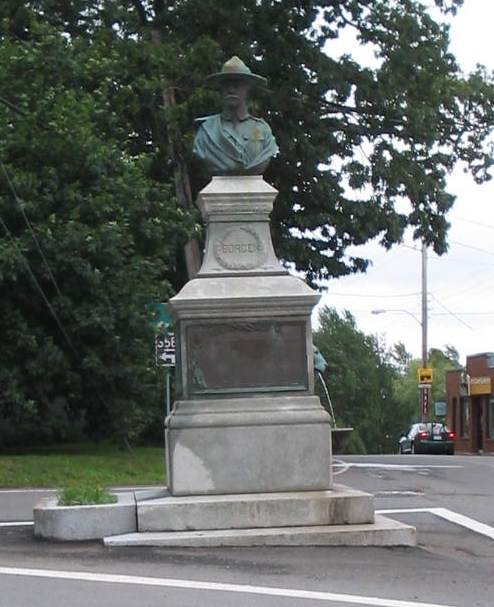
Harold Lothrop Borden – Second Boer War, Borden Monument, Canning, Nova Scotia

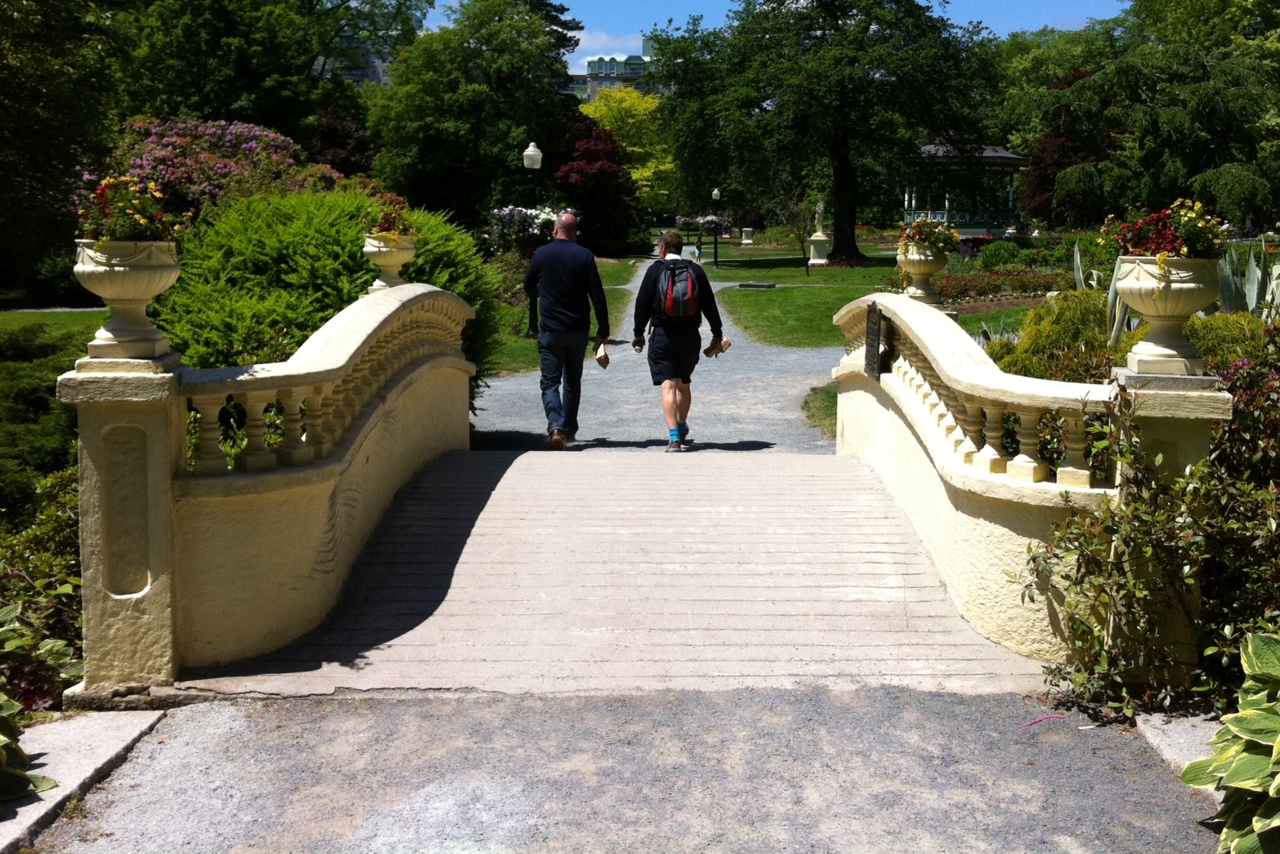
Francis Joseph Fitzgerald – Second Boer War, Fitzgerald Bridge in Halifax Public Gardens

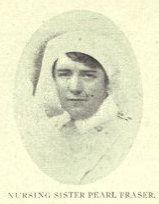
Margaret Marjory Fraser – World War I

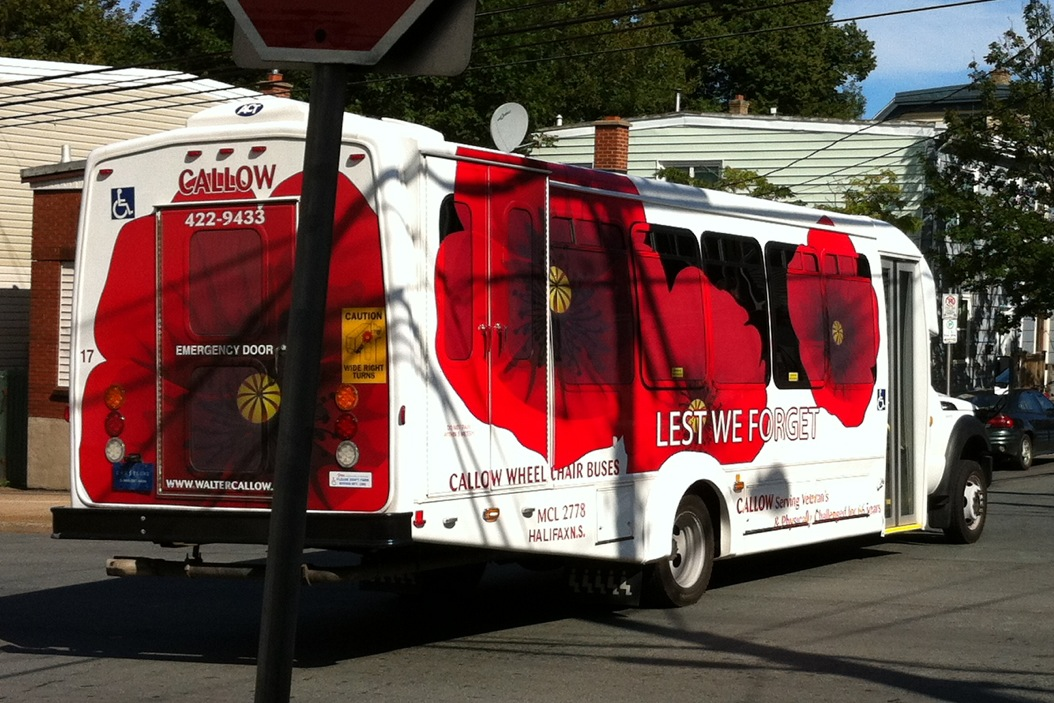
Walter Harris Callow – World War I, disabled veterans advocate

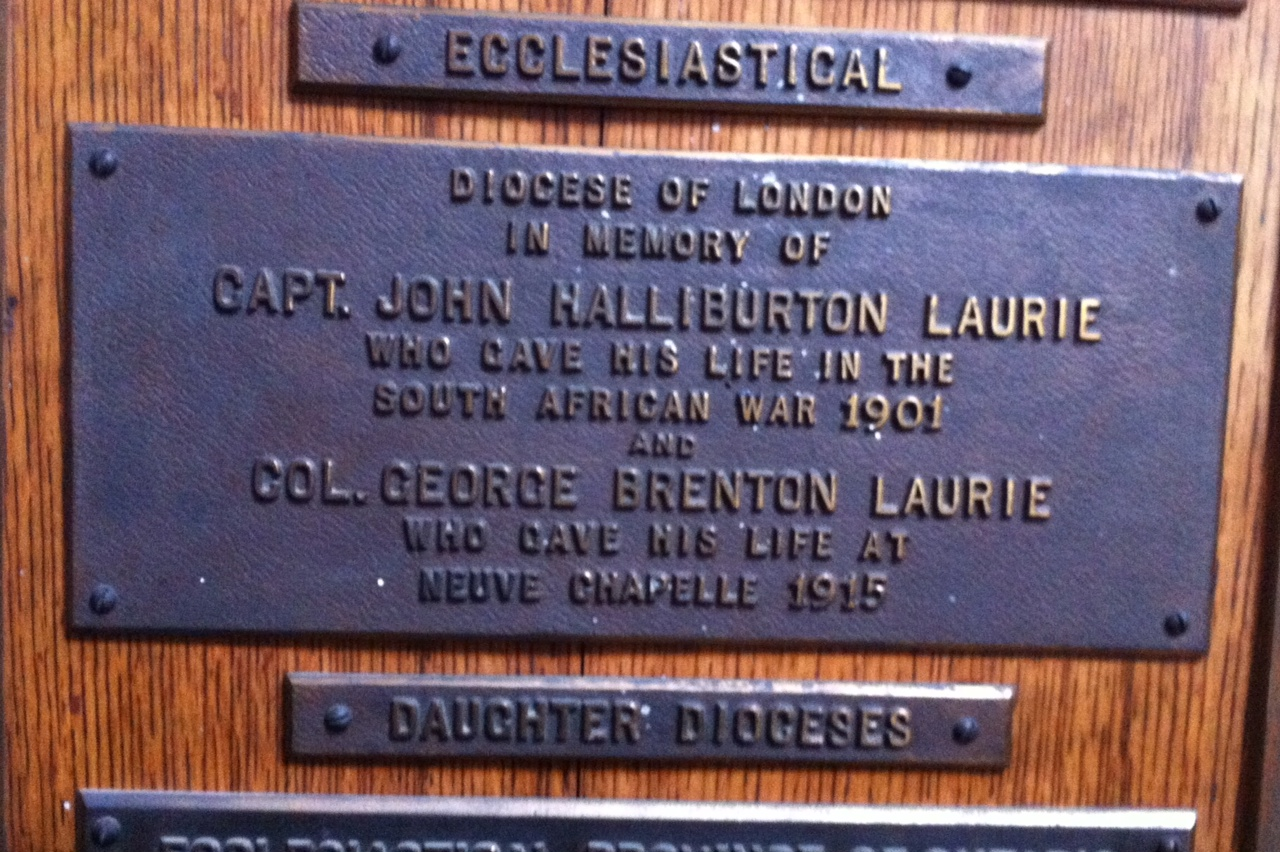
George Brenton Laurie – WW1

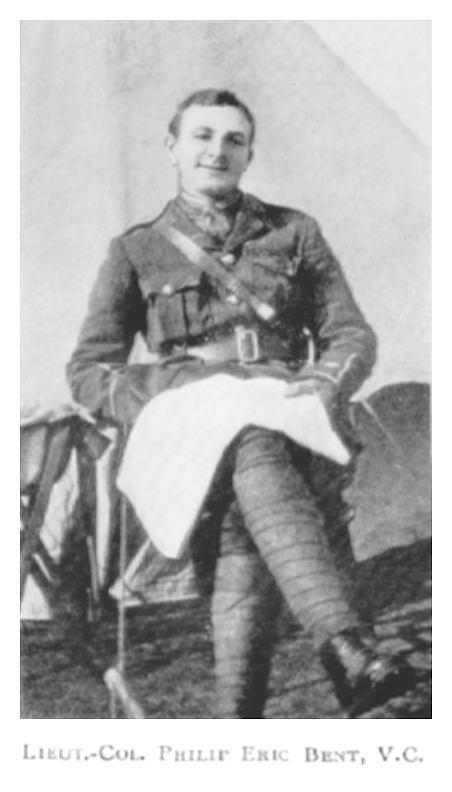
Philip Bent, VC – World War I

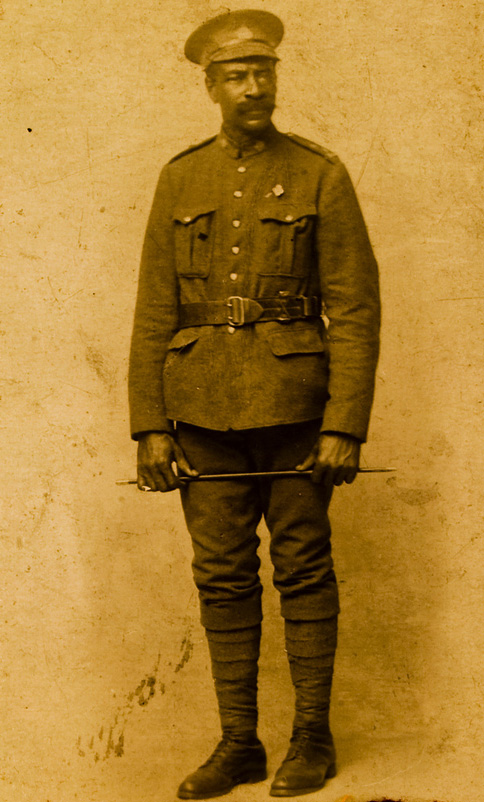
Jeremiah Jones – WW 1

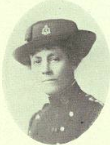
Margaret C. MacDonald – WW1

John Bernard Croak, VC – World War I

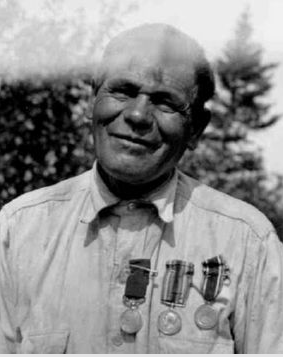
Sam Gloade – WW1

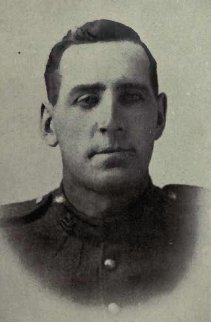
James Peter Robertson, VC – WWI

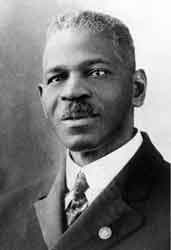
Reverend William A. White – WW1

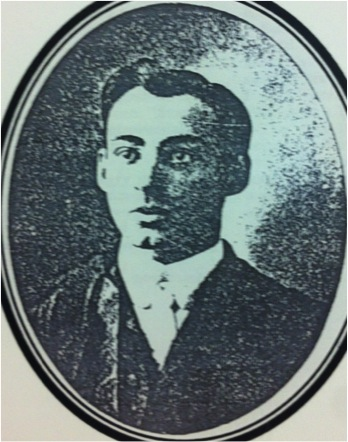
Roy Leitch – Spanish Civil War

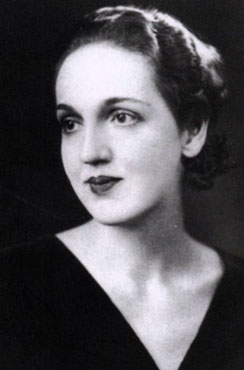
Mona Louise Parsons – World War II

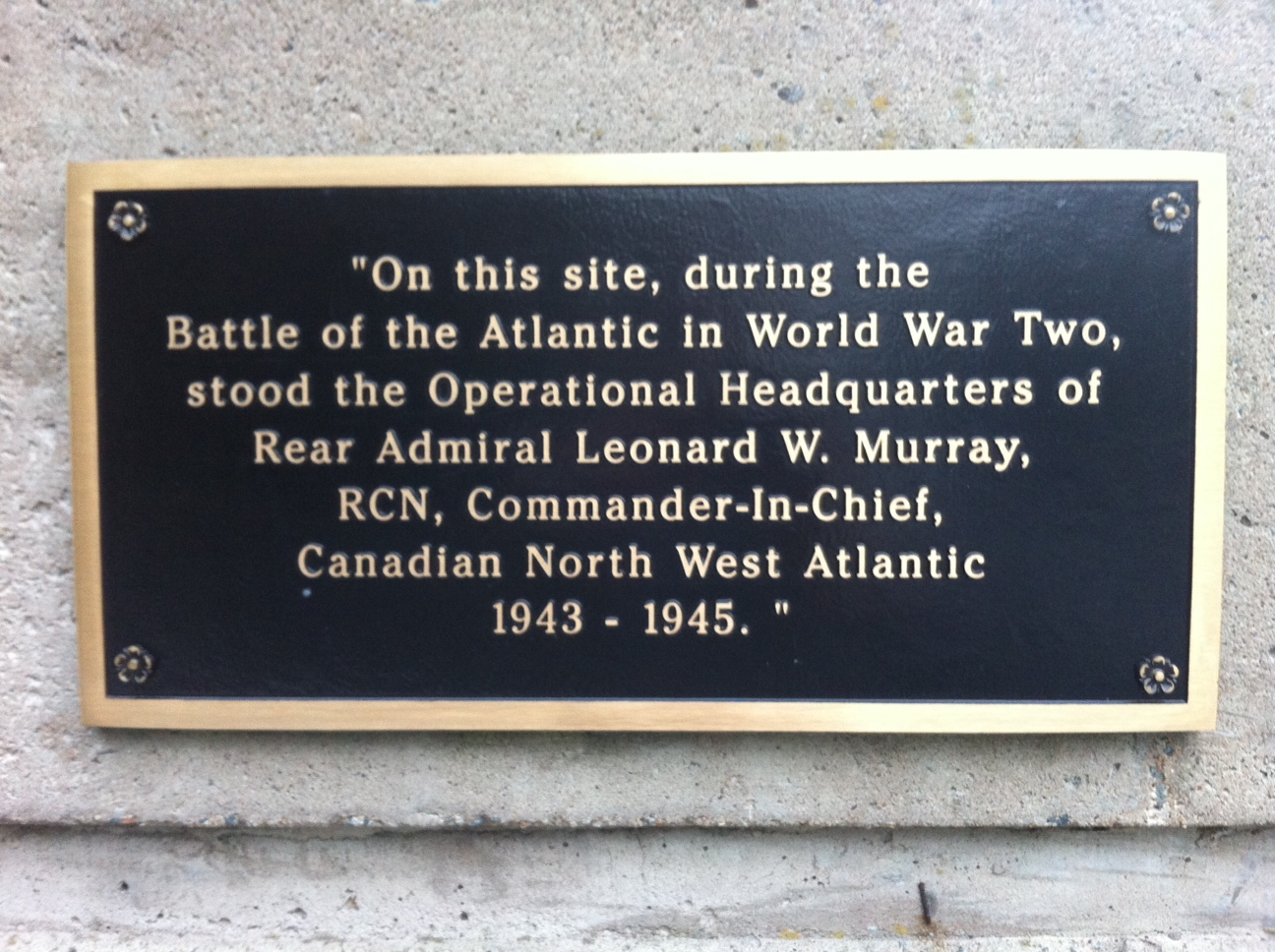
Leonard W. Murray – World War II

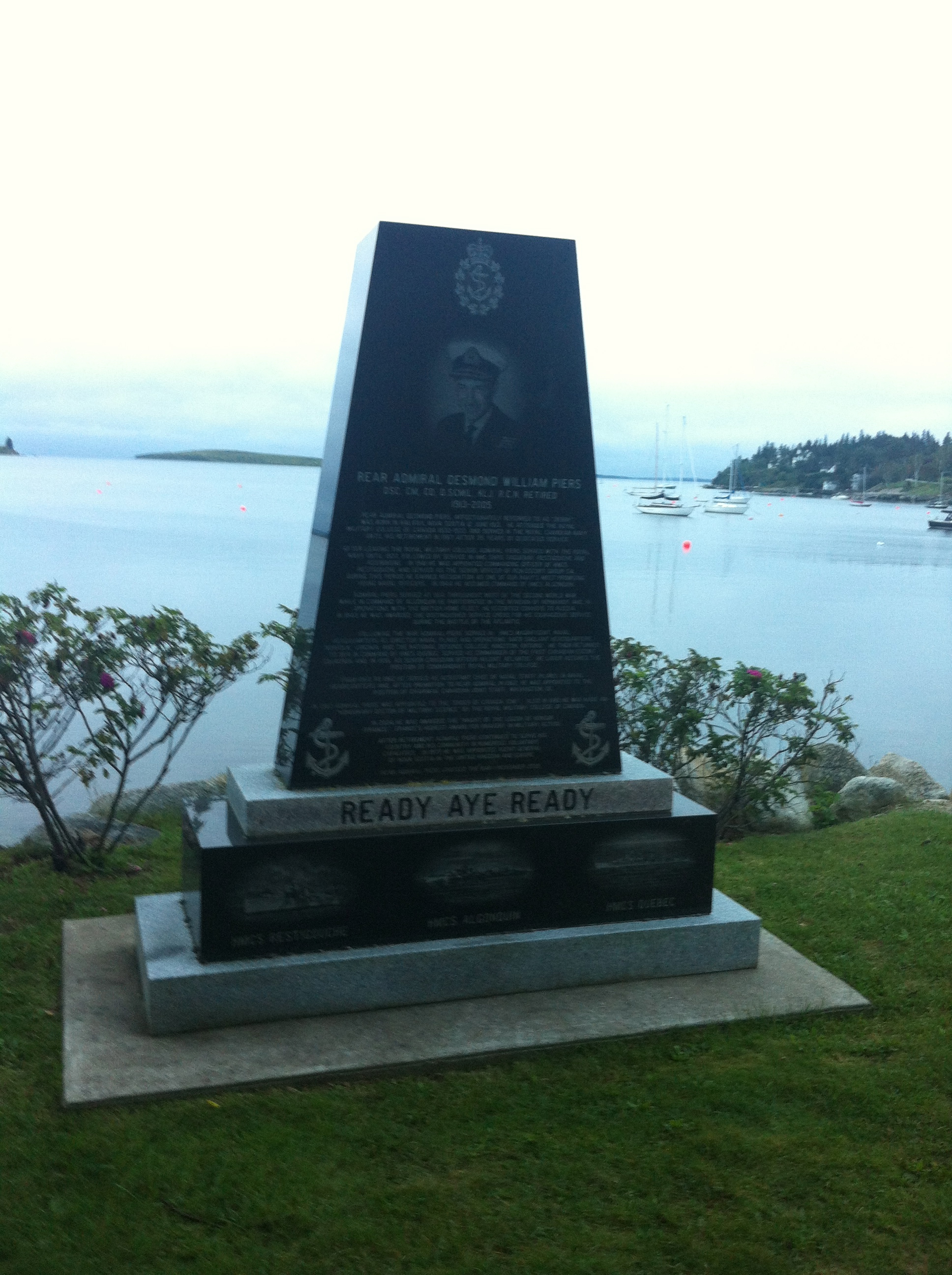
Desmond Piers – World War II
- William M. Jones
- Ransford D. Bucknam
- Edward Francis Arab

=== Nova Scotian Victoria Cross Recipients ===
This along with the *, indicates that the Victoria Cross was awarded posthumously

| Name | Date of action | Conflict | Unit | Place of action | Province of origin | Notes |
|---|---|---|---|---|---|---|
| Philip Bent | 1917* | First World War | The Leicestershire Regiment | Polygon Wood, Belgium | Nova Scotia | |
| John Croak | 1918* | First World War | 13th Battalion, CEF | Amiens, France | Nova Scotia | |
| William Hall | 1857 | Indian Mutiny | HMS Shannon | Lucknow, India | Nova Scotia | |
| John Kerr | 1916 | First World War | 49th Battalion, CEF | Courcelette, France | Nova Scotia | |
| James Robertson | 1917* | First World War | 27th Battalion, CEF | Passchendaele, Belgium | Nova Scotia | |

=== Communities and streets named after military leaders and battles ===
==== King Georges War ====
- Shirley St., Halifax, William Shirley
- Pepperell St., Halifax William Pepperell
- Mascarene Ave., Halifax, Paul Mascarene

==== Conflicts in Nova Scotia, 1749–1755 ====
- Port Hawkesbury, Edward Hawke, 1st Baron Hawke
- Morris St., Halifax, Charles Morris (jurist)
- Lawrencetown, Nova Scotia, Charles Lawrence
- Cornwallis, Nova Scotia, Edward Cornwallis
- Cornwalliis St., Halifax, Edward Cornwallis

==== Seven Years' War ====
- Amherst, Nova Scotia, Jeffery Amherst
- Cumberland County, Nova Scotia, Prince William, Duke of Cumberland
- Montague St., Lunenburg, Nova Scotia, Montague Wilmot

==== American Revolution ====
- Belcher Street, Port Williams, Nova Scotia, Lieut. Benjamin Belcher, hero of Battle of Blomindon
- Guysborough, Nova Scotia (Guy's borough), Guy Carleton, 1st Baron Dorchester
- Carleton Corner
- Carleton Village, Nova Scotia
- Birchtown, Nova Scotia, Brigadier-General Samuel Birch, compiler of the Book of Negroes
- Rawdon, Nova Scotia, Francis Rawdon-Hastings
- Digby, Nova Scotia, Admiral Robert Digby (Royal Navy officer)
- Abercrombie, Nova Scotia, General James Abercrombie
- Tiddville, Nova Scotia, Samuel Tidd, a private for Col. Beverley Robinson
- Gilbert Cove, Nova Scotia, Lt. Thomas Gilbert
- Barton, Nova Scotia, Lt. Col. Joseph Barton (military officer)
- Russell Lake, Nova Scotia, Nathaniel Russell
- Parrsboro, Nova Scotia, John Parr
- Wentworth, Nova Scotia, Sir John Wentworth, 1st Baronet
- Wentworth Valley, Nova Scotia
- Wentworth Station, Nova Scotia
- Douglas, Nova Scotia, Sir Charles Douglas, 1st Baronet

==== Napoleonic Wars ====
- Port Hood, Nova Scotia
- Westphal, Nova Scotia, George Augustus Westphal
- Castine Way, Dalhousie University, Halifax, Battle of Hampden
- Provo Wallis St., Halifax Dockyard, Provo Wallis
- Martinique, Nova Scotia, Invasion of Martinique (1809)
- Waterloo St. Halifax, Battle of Waterloo
- Wellington, St., Halifax, Arthur Wellesley, 1st Duke of Wellington
- Sherbrooke, Nova Scotia, John Coape Sherbrooke
- Admiral Rock, Nova Scotia, Admiral Alexander Cochrane
- Lake Ainslie, Ainslieview, Nova Scotia and Ainslie Point, Nova Scotia, George Robert Ainslie
- Kempt Shore, Nova Scotia, James Kempt
- Kempt Road, Nova Scotia
- Kempt Road, Halifax, Nova Scotia
- Kempt Street, Lunenburg

==== Crimean War ====
- Lucknow St., Halifax, Siege of Lucknow
- Inglis St., Halifax, John Eardley Inglis
- Havelock, Nova Scotia, Henry Havelock
- Karsdale, Nova Scotia, Sir William Williams, 1st Baronet, of Kars
- Port Williams, Nova Scotia, Sir William Williams, 1st Baronet, of Kars
- Parker St., Halifax, Sebastopol Monument
- Welsford St., Halifax, Sebastopol Monument
- Welsford St., Pictou, Nova Scotia
- Alma, Nova Scotia, Battle of Alma

==== American Civil War ====
- Ben Jackson Road (exit 8A Highway 101), Benjamin Jackson (soldier)
- Port Hastings, Nova Scotia, Charles Hastings Doyle

== See also ==
- Halifax Treaties
- The Nova Scotia Highlanders
- Naval Museum of Halifax
- Halifax Armoury
- CFB Greenwood
- CFB Halifax
- History of Nova Scotia
- History of New Brunswick
- History of the Halifax Regional Municipality
- Royal Nova Scotia Historical Society
- Military history of the Mi’kmaq people
- Military history of the Acadians
- Military history of Canada
