= No. 2 Construction Battalion =

Canadian battalion composed of Black soldiers in WWI

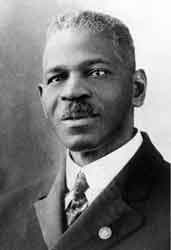
William A. White, a chaplain in the battalion and the first Black officer in the Canadian Army

The No. 2 Construction Battalion, Canadian Expeditionary Force (CEF), was raised in Nova Scotia and was one of two predominantly Black battalions in Canadian military history and the only Canadian battalion composed of Black soldiers to serve in World War I. Commanded by Lieutenant Colonel Daniel Hugh Sutherland, formerly of the 193rd Battalion, CEF.

== Historical context ==
Captain Runchey's Company of Coloured Men was one of the first Black regiments in Canada and served during the War of 1812. Another Black regiment raised in Canada was the Victoria Rifles (Nova Scotia) (1860–61), which was established just after the Crimean War on the eve of the American Civil War. They were led by Captain Anderson, who eventually resigned his command over how poorly the battalion was treated by local military establishment.

With the outbreak of the First World War, Canadians were excited to serve their country and many flocked to recruiting stations from British Columbia to Nova Scotia. This included hundreds of Black Canadians who were also eager and willing to serve. However, at the time few Black people were serving in the Canadian military because of the racial attitudes then prevalent. This time was no different and Black people attempted to enlist in the Canadian Expeditionary Force, but most were rejected and were told that it's a "White man's war." The Department of Militia and Defence's policy towards recruitment was to defer to the judgement of the individual commanding officer, and since many held deeply ingrained beliefs about the inferiority of Black people, very few were accepted. However, military officials eventually authorized the creation of a Black unit, the No. 2 Construction Battalion.

== Recruitment ==
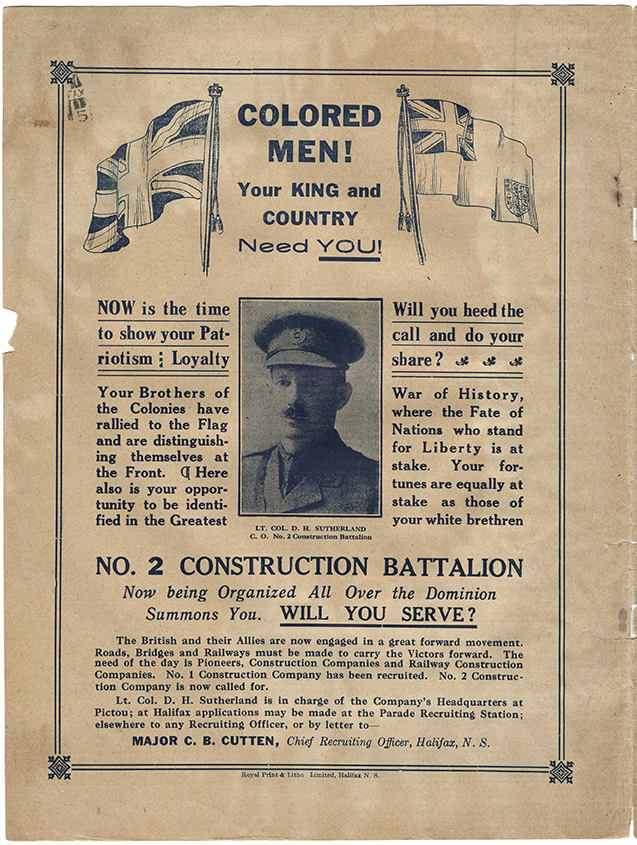
Recruitment poster for the No. 2 Construction Battalion

On May 11, 1916, the War Office informed the governor general that it approved of the formation of this unit. So on July 5, 1916, No. 2 Construction Battalion was authorized. Its headquarters was initially in Pictou, Nova Scotia, but moved to Truro, Nova Scotia, in September 1916.

The original intention was to recruit the unit primarily from the Maritimes, with companies also being raised in Ontario and Western Canada. A little over a month after the unit was authorized, however, only 180 recruits had been obtained. By November 1916, the recruiting situation had improved little, leading Lieutenant Colonel Sutherland to propose raising a company in the British West Indies. While nothing came of this (it was claimed that troops from the West Indies would be unsuitable for France’s cold weather), the battalion did manage to obtain about 165 men from the United States. When the men were finally assembled in March 1917 to prepare for departure overseas, the battalion's overall strength was just over 729 men. During their deployment, new troops of other nationalities, including 150 Russians, were attached to the unit. Although a Black unit, all but one of the unit's 19 officers were white, the exception being Captain William A. White, the unit's chaplain.

== Deployment ==
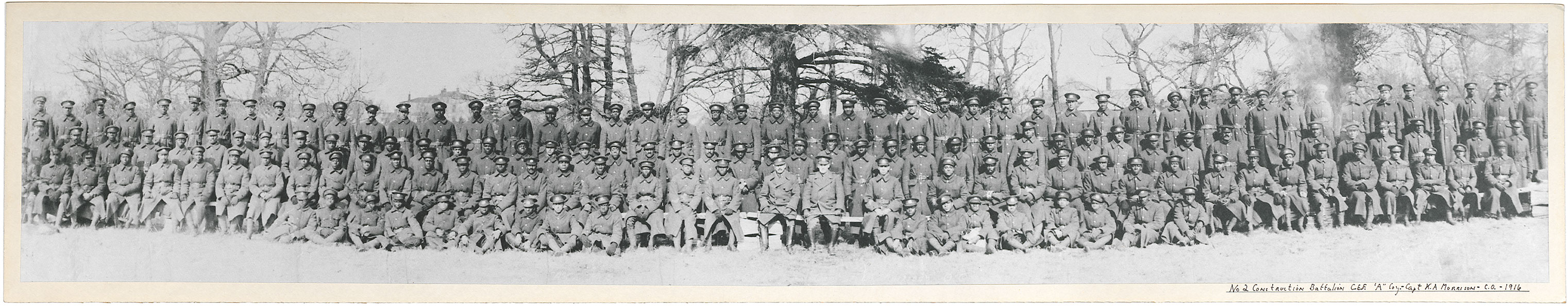
No. 2 Construction Battalion in Nova Scotia, 1916

The unit departed from Halifax, Nova Scotia, on board the SS Southland on March 28, 1917 and arrived at Liverpool, England, ten days later.

Lacking the numbers to make up a battalion (the smallest unit then deployed by army authorities), the unit was reorganized as No. 2 Construction Company in May 1917, and attached to the Canadian Forestry Corps (CFC). By the fall of 1917, the unit was operating in the Jura Mountains of France, headquartered at La Joux .

The unit conducted several operations crucial to the war effort. In conjunction with the CFC, troops of the No. 2 Construction Company axed down the trees of surrounding forests, transported the logs to mills, and milled them into lumber to be used on the front by Allied armies. Horses, trucks, and trains were used to transport the logs. The No. 2 Construction Company was responsible for handling and caring for the 70-100 horses. It drove the trucks and maintained the roads. It built a railroad and occasionally operated the trains. It was also responsible for operating and maintaining utilities for CFC camps, such as water pumps and an electrical power plant.

All this work was done despite terrible weather conditions and frequent breakouts of disease. The men worked hard, once setting a record by milling 95,000 board measures of wood in 10 hours with the help of No. 21 Company, CFC.

The men of No. 2 Construction Company returned to Canada in early 1919 and the unit officially disbanded on September 15 of the same year.

== Legacy ==
In 1981, the Society for the Protection and Preservation of Black Culture in Nova Scotia, which had been incorporated in 1977, chose as its first public event a reunion of Black First World War veterans. This reunion was held November 12–14, 1982, in Halifax and was attended by nine of the approximately twenty known surviving Black veterans. They were: William Carter (No. 2), John W. Hamilton (No. 2), Percy J. Richards (No. 2), Gordon C. Wilson (No. 2), Albert D. Deleon (CFC), A. Seymour Tyler (No. 2), Sydney M. Jones (106BN, The RCR), Isaac Phills (85BN), and John R. Pannill (Merchant Navy).

In 1992, the No. 2 Construction Battalion, CEF, was designated an event of national historic significance by the government of Canada, and a commemorative plaque was placed in Pictou, Nova Scotia, the following year.

In February 2007, the Black Cultural Centre for Nova Scotia successively acquired a Victory Medal for a former member of the unit, Sapper PR. P.F. Fenton, by Dave Thomson of St. George, Ontario, for over $7,400 that was being auctioned on eBay.

On June 1, 2022, the battalion was awarded the theatre of war honour "France and Flanders, 1917–18", and the perpetuation of the unit was assigned to the Canadian Military Engineers, with 4 Engineer Support Regiment having the privilege of publicly recognizing the perpetuation.

The awarding of this long-overdue battle honour serves as a means to celebrate and highlight the significant and distinguished efforts of all members of No. 2 Construction Battalion, CEF, during the Great War. This honour also highlights National Defence’s commitment towards culture change by correcting this long-standing historical injustice and addressing systemic racism. The perpetuation of No. 2 Construction Battalion, CEF, will ensure that identity and honours gained by this unit will endure in the CAF and DND.

The 2001 documentary film Honour Before Glory, produced by Anthony Sherwood, (Note: Anthony Sherwood is a great-nephew of William A. White) is based on White's wartime diary, which recorded the hardships faced by the Black soldiers, such as lack of proper clothing and medical care. In July 2022, Prime Minister Justin Trudeau apologized for the "blatant anti-Black hate and systemic racism" endured by the battalion's soldiers.

In October 2024 a new building at the 5th Canadian Division Support Base Detachment Aldershot near Kentville was named Private Frederick L. Landsay and Private James E. Landsay Building in honour of two brothers who served with the battalion. The Landsays grew up in the nearby Pine Woods neighbourhood.

== See also ==
- Black Canadian
- Portia White (daughter of William A. White)
- Military history of Nova Scotia
- Victoria Rifles (Nova Scotia)
- Captain Runchey's Company of Coloured Men
- Black Nova Scotians
