= Halifax Court House =

Historic building in Nova Scotia, Canada

Coordinates: 44°38′36.7″N 63°34′24.7″W

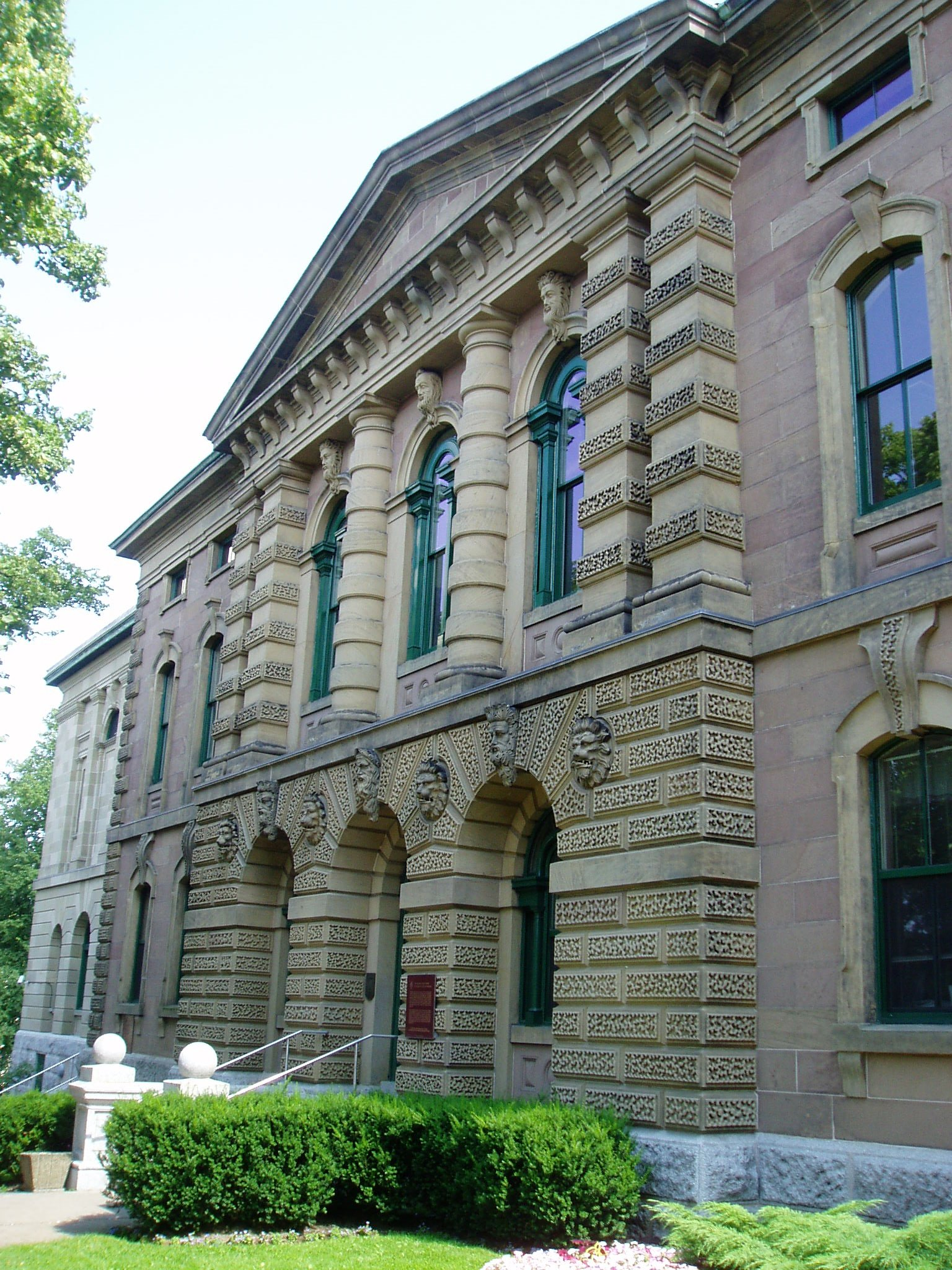
The Halifax Court House

The Halifax Court House is a historic building in downtown Halifax, Nova Scotia. Its main section was completed in 1863, with the east wing, built in 1930, being the newest portion. The Italian Renaissance style building was designed by William Thomas, a Toronto architect who created prominent structures across Canada, and built by George Lang.

The building was designated a National Historic Site of Canada in 1969. It was also listed as a Provincially Registered Property under Nova Scotia's Heritage Property Act in 1983.

Nova Scotia Supreme Court sat for the first time in the newly built Halifax County courthouse on Spring Garden Road in October 1860 and continued using it until 1960 when the building temporarily became the Provincial Library and then the home of the Provincial Court in 1971. The most recent renovations to the building were completed in 1985.

== Building ==
By the 1850s a decision was made to consolidate all the Halifax courts under one roof. After fires razed many downtown buildings during that decade (three major fires destroyed many of the city’s wooden buildings between 1857 and 1861, officials abandoned plans for a wooden structure in favour of a more fireproof option made of stone, to protect the legal records it would house. Following the fires, almost all major buildings were constructed of brick and stone. Built on the grounds of what was then the Governor's Garden, location of the court was as contentious back in the 1850s as location of public buildings it is today. Even when the Spring Garden Courthouse was opened the location remained contentious and lawyers, reported to have "complained that the building is too far away from the business parts of the city" and it remained unpopular.

Halifax carpenter Henry Hill designed the building and Toronto-based architect William Thomas and Sons were retained and created a palatial structure in sandstone. The building was built by contractor George Lang who also built The Halifax Club and the Welsford-Parker Monument at the Front gate of St Paul's Cemetery. Made from brown stone from Mary's Point New Brunswick and Wallace sandstone from Cumberland County. The Wallace quarry sandstone was also used at Nova Scotia's Province House, Province House in Charlottetown and some Parliament Buildings in Ottawa. It was proclaimed in the 1860 Halifax city directory that the "court house would do honour to any city in Europe, and cannot be surpassed for architectural beauty by any city of the same size on the continent of America."

The building's architectural exterior is classic with palladian style that represents stability and strength. Decorative features of the building include use of vermiculation and the carving of, replete with carvings of the faces of snarling lions and stern, bearded men in each key stone of the original building's central arches. Interior architectural features to be noted are the pressed metal ceilings, the elaborate arched doorways, the wood paneling and plaster details in the courtrooms and the entry foyer and staircase. In 1863 gas heat replaced 14 fireplaces that inadequately heated the building. The 14 fireplaces remain today though there are none located in the courtrooms.

When originally constructed the Courthouse had two courtrooms, judicial robing and jury rooms, a law library and offices for the prothonotary and registrar of chancery. One of the first occupants was the Sheriff and the office of the Sheriff has remained in the court since. Due to the demand for court space, an addition to the back in the 1881–82 added additional courts. Matching wings were erected on either end of the building in 1908 (west wing designed by Herbert E. Gates, architect) and 1930 (east wing) to offer additional courtrooms and office space that are now occupied by the Provincial Crown and Judges' Chambers.

Today the court houses six courtrooms, judges chambers, court administration offices, the Provincial Crown and cells that can jail up to 50 prisoners. The historic character of the Courthouse remain today and ongoing renovations and upgrades are designed ensure that they honour the original architecture design while at the same time providing efficient modern-day court functions.

The Courthouse has been designated as an historic site of national significance by the Historic Sites and Monument Board.

== Halifax Explosion ==
A collision occurred on December 6, 1917 in Halifax Harbour between the vessels, SS Mont-Blanc and SS Imo and resulted in a blast that decimated the district known as Richmond, in the North End of the city. The courthouse suffered $19,000 in damage even though it was farther to the south. At the time, Nova Scotia Supreme Court cases were heard in court room #2 on the second floor, east side of the stairwell. Courtroom #1 (now #4) was used for everything else including Admiralty Court. The walls of the court room itself had sustained some damage and the blown out windows were boarded up. Purportedly, oil lamps were used because the power was out.

A judicial inquiry known as the Wreck Commissioner's Inquiry was formed to investigate the causes of the collision. Proceedings began at the courthouse on 13 December 1917, presided over by Justice Arthur Drysdale. The inquiry's report of 4 February 1918 blamed Mont-Blanc's captain, Aimé Le Médec, the ship's pilot, Francis Mackey, and Commander F. Evan Wyatt, the Royal Canadian Navy's chief examining officer in charge of the harbour, gates and anti-submarine defences, for causing the collision. All three men were charged with manslaughter and criminal negligence at a preliminary hearing heard by Stipendiary Magistrate Richard A. McLeod, and bound over for trial. However, a Nova Scotia Supreme Court justice, Benjamin Russell found there was no evidence to support these charges. Mackey was discharged on a writ of habeas corpus and the charges dropped. As the captain and pilot had been arrested on the same warrant, the charges against Le Médec were also dismissed. This left only Wyatt to face a grand jury hearing. On 17 April 1918, a jury acquitted him in a trial that lasted less than a day.

Drysdale also oversaw the first civil litigation trial, in which the owners of the two ships sought damages from each other. His decision (27 April 1918) found Mont-Blanc entirely at fault. Subsequent appeals to the Supreme Court of Canada (19 May 1919), and the Judicial Committee of the Privy Council in London (22 March 1920), determined Mont-Blanc and Imo were equally to blame for navigational errors that led to the collision. No party was ever convicted for any crime or otherwise successfully prosecuted for any actions that precipitated the disaster.

== Elevators ==
Courtroom #2 featured an elevator that could ferry prisoners directly into the courtroom from the cells below, but it was removed in the 1930s after it malfunctioned and left a prisoner trapped between floors. It has been noted that "...a prisoner was being sent up to the courtroom to face the judge. Everything was ready for the processes of the law to run along smoothly - but one thing was missing - a prisoner. The ... accused was trapped between floors. And, before the trial could go ahead, they had a difficult time to get the elevator released and the prisoner freed from his unpleasant situation.

== Hauntings ==
The last hanging in Halifax occurred on March 7, 1935. Daniel Sampson was hanged for the murder of two boys. He was hanged in back of the courthouse where the parking lot now exists. To this day ghosts of those executed haunt the attic of the courthouse where pieces of wood from the old public gallows are stored. It is said that the wood is stored in a dark, eerie room in the upper story of the building are pieces of the old Halifax gallows, on which many of the city's more infamous criminals met their end long ago. Many years ago one of the building's janitors ran terrified and shaken from the room, swearing he had seen a ghost, and vowing never to return to the room again (a promise he reportedly kept). To this day, staff are hesitant to go to the attic alone where court records are stored.

== See also ==
- List of historic places in Halifax, Nova Scotia
- List of oldest buildings and structures in Halifax, Nova Scotia

== Bibliography ==
- Armstrong, John Griffith (2002). The Halifax Explosion and the Royal Canadian Navy. UBC Press. ISBN 978-0-7748-0891-0.
- Flemming, David (2004). Explosion in Halifax Harbour. Formac. ISBN 978-0-88780-632-2.
- Mac Donald, Laura (2005). Curse of the Narrows: The Halifax Explosion of 1917. HarperCollins. ISBN 978-0-00-200787-0.
- Zemel, Joel (2014). Scapegoat, the extraordinary legal proceedings following the 1917 Halifax Explosion. New World Publishing. ISBN 978-1-895814-62-0.
