= Halifax Volunteer Battalion =

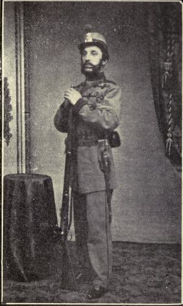
Chebucto Grays, Full Dress Uniform

The Halifax Volunteer Battalion (1860–1868) included six companies that were raised in present-day Halifax Regional Municipality. The six companies included the Scottish Rifles, Chebucto Grays, Mayflower Rifles, Halifax Rifles, Irish Volunteers and Dartmouth Rifles which were all raised in the fall of 1859. The upper ranks of the battalion was made up of distinguished people from the community filling the ranks of officers. The battalion served ceremonial functions, raised money for charities as well as defended the city against possible military threat during the Fenian Raids. The present-day The Halifax Rifles (RCAC) descended from the 63rd regiment of the battalion.

== Historical context ==
In the wake of the Crimean War (1853–1856), there developed a Volunteer Force in Britain. As part of this movement, in Nova Scotia, thirty-two Volunteer companies were raised in the province, with a total strength of two thousand three hundred and forty-one. In Halifax there were eleven companies with a total strength of eight hundred and sixty-eight men.

From the outset there was an inclination exhibited to organize by nationalities, and in December 1859, English, Scotch, Black and Irish companies were formed, each keeping its particular national character. The First Battalion, Volunteer Militia Rifles of Canada, Montreal, organized 17 November 1859, and the 2nd Battalion, Volunteer Militia Rifles of Canada, Toronto, organized 26 April 1860. Eighteen days later, the Halifax Volunteer Battalion was raised – the third battalion to be raised in all of British North America.

== Formation ==
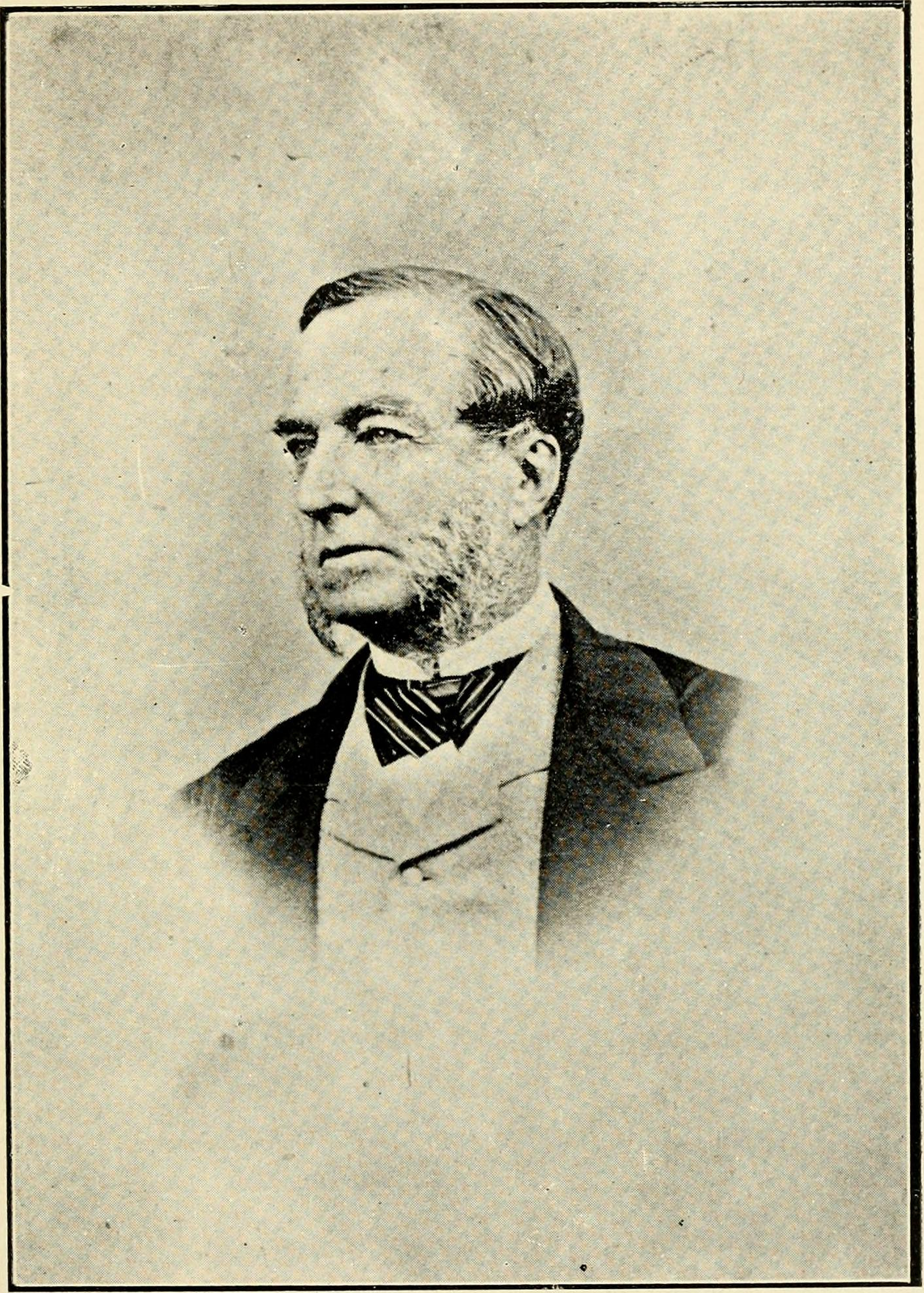
Lt. Col. William Chearnley - "Father of the Regiment"

On 14 May 1860, six of the eleven volunteer companies qualified to form the Halifax Volunteer Battalion. Sir William Fenwick Williams, a Nova Scotian hero of the Crimean War, was requested to accept the position of honorary colonel. Capt. William Chearnley of the Chebucto Greys was appointed commander of the whole battalion. (Colonel Chearnley came to be considered the father of the regiment and retired in 1871. When he died he was given a military burial by the battalion.)

Companies of the battalion drilled in various locations around present-day Halifax. Some of the companies mustered on Grand Parade for morning drill at 6 am. One company of the battalion – the Halifax Rifles – conducted drills during the winter in the hall of the Provincial Building.

During the summer the companies proceeded to a rifle range at Point Pleasant Park to go through their regular course of position drill and rifle practice. The "Scottish" and the "Greys" encamped on the ground, while the other companies marched down each day. Regular target practice took place at the Fort Needham range. Every fine day in Halifax, from daylight, the crack of the rifles could be heard.

== Welsford-Parker Monument Inauguration ==
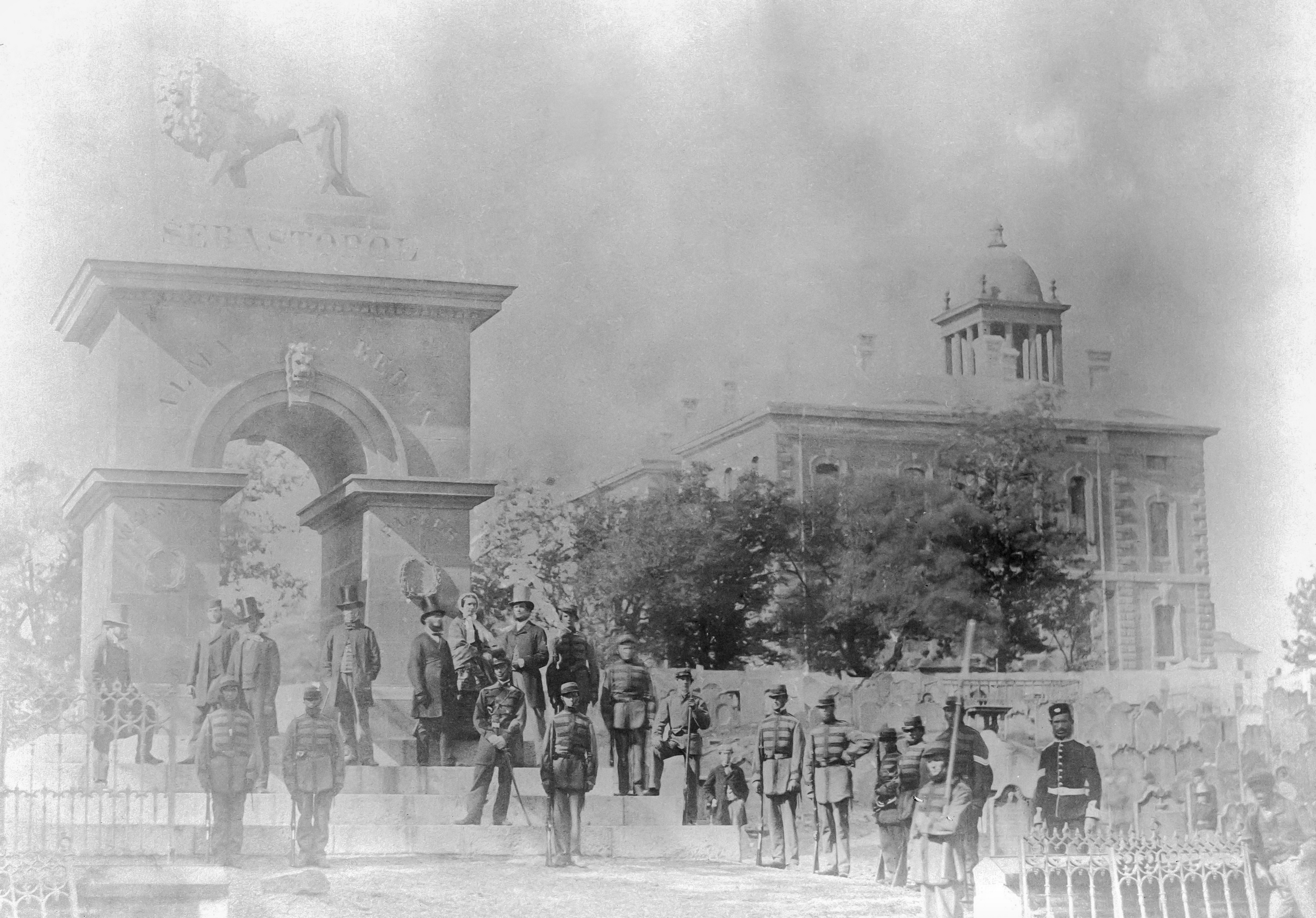
The Welsford-Parker Monument Inauguration - George Lang of Chebucto Grays standing far left in front pair.

The Welsford-Parker Monument was inaugurated on 17 July 1860. Present to mark the occasion were both the 62nd and 63rd with their bands. There were also companies for the Halifax Volunteer Battalion: the Mayflower Rifles, the Halifax Rifles and the Chebucto Grays. One prominent member of the Chebucto Grays in attendance was the man who carved the lion and built the monument George Lang.

The oration at the inauguration was given by Rev. Hill. He specifically mentioned the importance of the Halifax Volunteer Regiment:

"It is more than pleasing that in dedicating a public monument to Nova Scotian soldiers, the Nova Scotia Volunteers stand side by side with the brave troops with whom our countrymen served so long. Numbering in your ranks the very flower of the land, in age, position, strength and form, your country [Nova Scotia] may well be proud of you. They honor your ready response to the call of the noble Earl; your willingness to sacrifice time and business; your devoted attention to the necessary training; your rapid attainments and your marital aspect. … On you we look as the guardians of our land and the best ramparts of our coast; to you we look to uphold and cherish that loyalty which characterized your forefathers, and now marks yourselves."

Colours were presented to the Battalion on 10 November 1862, by the Halifax City Council.

== Fenian Raids ==
To protect Nova Scotia from a possible Fenian Raid, the battalion was put on high alert from 27 March 1866 until 14 April 1866. They were called out for duty and drilled on Grand Parade. All ball practice was prohibited and no member of the battalion was allowed beyond the city limits without special leave. The brick office, where the Deputy Adjutant General's office now stands, on Spring Garden Road, was used as a guard room, and a picket told of every day for duty. The men were recruited to provide their own rations, and two men for fatigue were told off with each guard, whose duty it was to look after the provisions; as a rule the families of the men sent their meals ready cooked to the guard rooms.

The companies were ordered to parade in full marching order with great coats, blankets and canteen: The Greys and Halifax Rifles (2nd Company) to proceed to McNab's Island, under command of Major Mackinlay; the Scottish Rifles, under Captain McLean, to George's Island; the remainder of the battalion to remain under arms at headquarters, ready to proceed to whatever post they were required at. The battalion showed a good spirit in this the first serious call for duty, the men mustered promptly, and although no inroad actually took place at that time, the authorities were satisfied that the battalion could be relied on should its services be required. In March an action at law, for libel, was entered into by the companies against the Rev. D. Faloon Hutchinson, editor and proprietor of a newspaper called the Burning Bush, he having, in an article headed " The Good Fenians of Halifax," intimated that the Halifax Rifles were members of the Fenian Brotherhood. The commander-in-chief, through Colonel Chearnley, expressed his entire confidence in the company and his disapprobation of the action of a minister of the gospel fomenting sectarian ill-will in the ranks of the volunteer forces. The Rev. Hutchinson subsequently withdrew his offensive remarks, paid all the expenses of the suit, and published a full retraction of his charges against the company. Shortly after, on an alarm being given and the volunteers mustered for duty to repel a Fenian invasion. General Doyle, when addressing the battalion and detailing the companies to their different posts, said: "as the Halifax Rifles had been accused of being Fenians, I will give them the post of honor nearest the expected point of attack," and they were ordered, on the signal being given, to McNab's island.

== Royal Visits ==
The Halifax Volunteer Battalion played an important role during four royal visits. The first was by Edward, Prince of Wales (future king Edward VII) on 24 July 1860. This occasion was the first in which the battalion was inspected before royalty. On 2 August, under Captain Bulger, the Halifax Rifles and the Irish Volunteer Company traveled by train to Windsor at 3:00 a.m. in advance of the Prince of Wales. The Prince of Wales travelled to Windsor on a special train from Halifax. Prince Edward travelled to Windsor to make a speech at Kings College. The royal party left Government House on Hollis Street, and rode in carriages to Richmond, where at 7:00 am the special train departed for Windsor. At Windsor they were met by a guard of honour made up of the two Halifax companies of the battalion. The companies acted as a guard until his departure for Saint John, New Brunswick.

Prince Arthur, Duke of Connaught and Strathearn visited Nova Scotia in August 1869 and the battalion were an integral part of the proceedings. (Prince Arthur later would visit again in 1912 as the 10th Governor General of Canada.)

In 1878, Princess Louise, Duchess of Argyll and her husband, the Marquis of Lorne, arrived at Halifax where he was sworn in at Province House as the 4th governor general of Canada before heading to Ottawa to assume his duties. In November, Princess Louise and the Marquis of Lome, landed in Halifax, and the battalion paraded at their reception and also furnished a guard of honor at the railway station on their departure for Ottawa. In February, on the arrival of Princess Louise, the 63rd furnished a guard of honor, and also at the opening and closing of the House of Assembly. Three years later, in 1881, the Halifax Rifles mustered in full force with the battalion, and took part in the review and inspection held by the Marquis of Lorne at Sussex, New Brunswick, and also took part in a review on Halifax Common, in the presence of the Marquis of Lorne.

== Conclusion ==
With the confederation of Canada (1867) and the Dominion Militia Act, in 1868, the Halifax Volunteer Battalion was transferred to the dominion and renamed the "Halifax Volunteer Battalion of Rifles". In 1870 the Battalion was renamed the 63rd Battalion of Rifles. The 63rd eventually amalgamated with the Halifax Provisional Battalion and fought in the North-West Rebellion.

== See also ==
- Victoria Rifles (Nova Scotia)
- Volunteer Force (Great Britain)
