= William Chearnley =

British military officer (1809–1871)

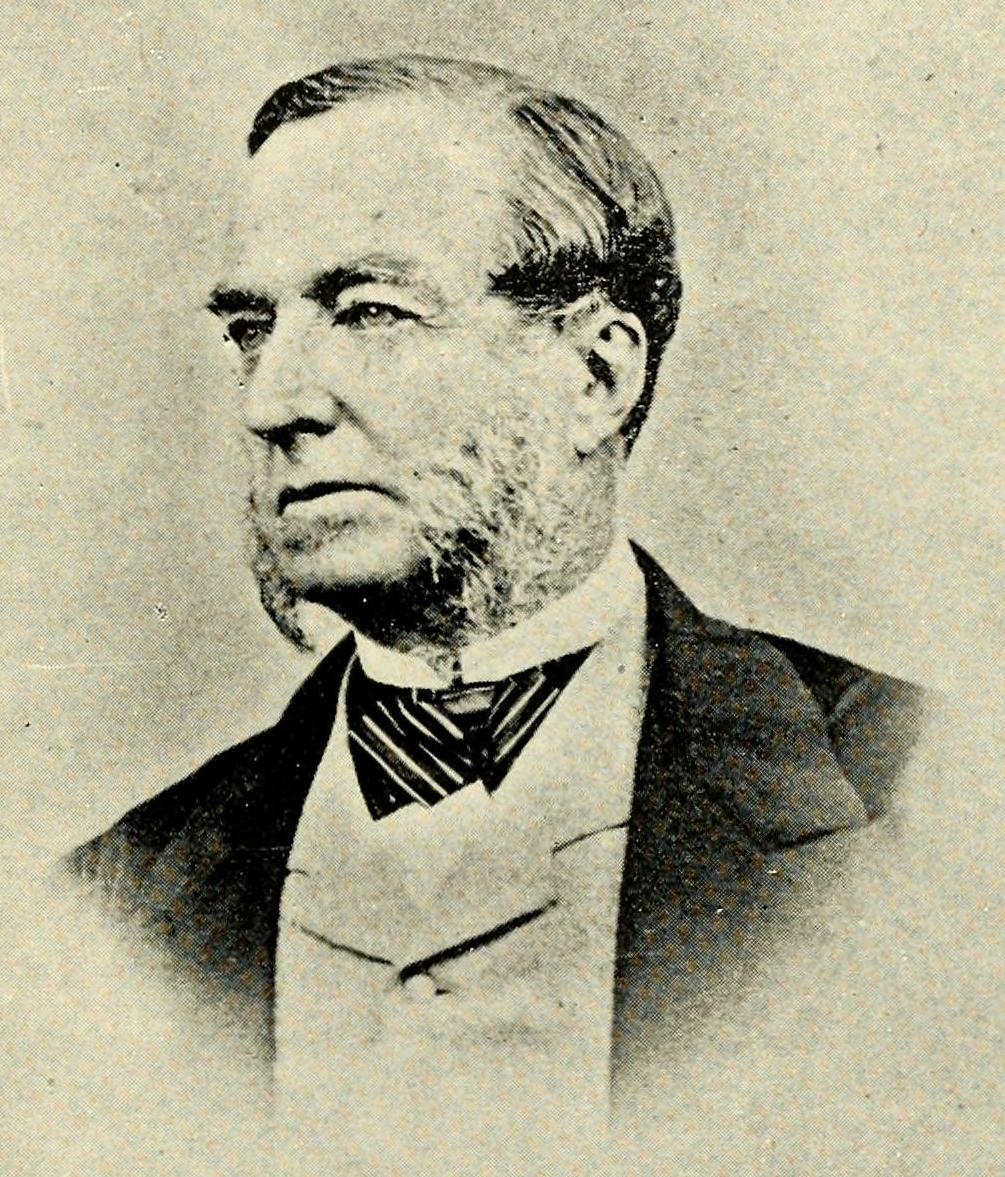
- Born: William Chearnley; 18 January 1809; Salterbridge, County Waterford, British Ireland
- Died: 9 July 1871 (aged 62); Boston, United States
- Burial place: Camp Hill Cemetery
- Military career
- Allegiance: United Kingdom of Great Britain and Ireland
- Branch: British Army
- Rank: Lieutenant colonel
- Unit: 8th (The King's) Regiment of Foot
- Commands: Chebucto Grays; Halifax Volunteer Battalion

William Chearnley (18 January 1809 – 9 July 1871) was a British military officer who became Nova Scotia Indian Commissioner and the commanding officer of the Halifax Volunteer Battalion.

== Early life ==
William Chearnley was born on 18 January 1809 at Salterbridge, County Waterford, British Ireland. He had a brother named John Chearnley. He was the son of Anthony Chearnley, the High Sheriff of County Waterford and grandson of the late Archbishop William Newcome, Lord Primate of Ireland.

In Ireland, the Chearnley family held substantial property that generated a significant annual income. By 1840, the brothers had established themselves in Halifax, Nova Scotia, preferring life in Canada.

== Career ==
Chearnley joined the British Army's 8th (The King's) Regiment of Foot under Sir Henry Bayly as an ensign on 26 November 1825 and attained the rank of lieutenant on 15 October 1829. Serving on the regiment in Nova Scotia from 1830 to 1833 and from 1839 to 1841. When the regiment left in 1833, Chearnley remained in Halifax. William Chearney was made a captain of the 8th (The King's) Regiment of Foot stationed in Halifax, Nova Scotia on 7 August 1835. By 1840, he was a major in the 8th regiment with Bayly as colonel and Thomas Gerard Ball as lieutenant colonel.

Starting in the 1850s, William Chearnley served as a Commissioner of Indian Affairs (similar to Indian agent) for Nova Scotia. He held the role from 1853 to 1862.

Chearnley, an avid hunter and sportsman, explored and took advantage of the wilderness in Nova Scotia and New Brunswick during the early 1850s. Chearnley also traveled to Newfoundland, where he hunted caribou alongside his brother John and a Mi'kmaw guide, James Cope. Guided by Cope, the brothers navigated the lower Humber River, Deer Lake, and Upper Humber River, passing through Junction Brook, Grand Lake, and Sandy River before reaching Birchy Bay, a region abundant with caribou, foxes, and black bears. A record of their hunting trips between 1853 and 1859 were carved on a tree in Freemason's Point, Newfoundland.

His hunting and fishing activities took him to Guysborough, Halifax, and Lunenberg counties and the Beech Hill district, where he stayed at the old inn on Fort St. in Chester. He hunted with Joseph Penall of Gold River, another one of his Mi'kmaw guides. At Saint Augustine's Roman Catholic Cemetery in Chester, Nova Scotia, Chearnley erected a stone with the following inscription: "In memory of Joseph Pennall, Indian, By Wm. Chearnley, A.D. 1859. Gone to death's call is Indian Joe; Moose, deer rejoice, here buried rests your deadliest foe."

He was an advocate for game preservation and instrumental in promoting provincial legislation to protect it. Chearnley established the "Provincial Association for the Protection of the Inland Fisheries and Game of Nova Scotia" (now the Halifax Wildlife Association) in 1853. He led the organization for many years as its first president.

In 1854, the Nova Scotia-based agent expressed skepticism about the Mi'kmaq's work ethic, stating, "Their character is such that I fear we shall always find them to be a people unwilling to work." On 4 March of that year, Chearnley corresponded with Joseph Howe, Nova Scotia's first Commissioner of Indian Affairs. Chearnley, interested in native art, later commissioned Mi'kmaw craftsperson Christiana Morris to craft two traditional Mi'kmaw women's outfits for $300. He ordered one outfit for his personal collection and the other for his wife to wear to social gatherings. He also suggested her as a subject for a portrait by British artist William Gush during his visit to Nova Scotia in 1858. On 10 February 1859, Chearnley's 1858 report disclosed that £300 had gone toward buying 1,226 blankets for distribution throughout different sections of the province. The following year's report, he acquired many second-hand greatcoats with that year's funds.

Chearnley was appointed captain of the Chebucto Grays (or the 12th Company) on 15 December 1859. He was also linked to the Halifax Rifles, a regiment composed of prominent Irishmen and those of Irish descent. On 15 May 1860, he was appointed as the commanding officer of the Halifax Volunteer Battalion. The battalion was formed by six companies, including the Scottish Rifles, the Chebucto Grays, Mayflower Rifles, Halifax Rifles, Irish Volunteers, and Dartmouth Rifles. Capt. Chearnley, despite his expanded role, remained captain of the Grays and still looked after "his boys." He led the first battalion drill on 30 May 1860 at the South Barracks yard. The Grays, under Chearnley's disciplined leadership, rapidly improved their drill efficiency. Chearnley was in command of the volunteer rifle brigade on 24 July 1860 upon the landing of the Prince of Wales (future King Edward VII) in Halifax. He was referenced in correspondence with Admiral Henry Seymour and his father George Seymour as the colonel leading more than 600 well-drilled volunteers, who showcased various maneuvers during a review. By April 1861, the Halifax Rifles and Chearnley's Chebucto Grays drilled together at the drill shed on Spring Garden Road.

In 1861, the Commissioner of Indian Affairs informed his colleagues of the following: "The condition of the Indians in Nova Scotia and Cape Breton may be described as destitute and miserable... they seemed destined to live a roving life, almost wholly dependent on charity."

Col. William Chearnley accepted the colours on behalf of the 63rd Regiment on 10 November 1862, a gift from the City of Halifax in recognition of their dedication to training for Canada's defense.

Chearnley supplied a moose head that was stuffed and mounted by Halifax taxidermist Andrew Downs. The moose head was first showcased at the Halifax Court House, then moved to Dalhousie College and the council room of the Province House, before being shipped to the 1862 International Exhibition in London. In 1863, Capt. Chearnley, joined by Campbell Hardy, and Westcote W. Lyttleton, held an exhibition in the armoury of the volunteers' drill-room in Halifax. The exhibits included oil and water-color paintings as well as engravings.

Chearnley, A. Downs, and C. Hardy in 1864 outlined regulations for the Nova Scotia Inland Fisheries and Game Protection Society. Chearnley was an active member of the Halifax Mechanics' Institute. The dedicated outdoorsman donated a large collection of caribou antlers to the institute.

Promoted to lieutenant colonel on 20 June 1865, Chearnley led the Halifax Volunteer Battalion until 1871, when Maj. Mackinlay took over. Amid the Fenian raids, Col. Chearnley's battalion filled in for the regulars on garrison duty for eight weeks, drawing recognition from General Charles Hastings Doyle and Henry Herbert, 4th Earl of Carnarvon.

In October 1868, the Provincial Agricultural and Industrial Exhibition of Nova Scotia was held in Halifax, and he was a member of its general committee.

== Personal life ==
On 2 June 1856, Chearnley was granted land in Colchester County. His main residence was located on Gottigen Street in Halifax.

William Chearnley married a Halifax woman with the surname McNab, who moved to Rome with their daughter years after his death. His daughter was named Janet Edith Musgrave.

He also had a son, William Chearnley, a mixed-race boy whom Chearnley owned, acknowledged as his son, and whose education he ensured. He resided in Truro, worked as a pullman porter on the Intercolonial Railway, and later joined the Reid Newfoundland Railway.

William and his brother John Chearnley were members of the St. John's A.F. & A.M. (Ancient Free & Accepted Masons) Lodge in Halifax.

== Death ==
William Chearnley died on 9 July 1871 in Boston, United States. The battalion turned out in force in July to honor Col. Chearnley’s funeral, where the 63rd Regiment conducted the firing salute as part of the tribute. He was buried in Camp Hill Cemetery.

== Legacy ==
He was considered the "father" of the 63rd Battalion of Rifles. The Waterford County Museum contains a letter William Chearnley sent from Halifax to his brother John in Waterford.
