= Halifax Wildlife Association =

Canadian wildlife organization

- Abbreviation: HWA
- Formation: 18 March 1853; 173 years ago
- Founder: William Chearnley
- Type: Nonprofit organization
- Purpose: Species conservation; Conservation
- Headquarters: Halifax, Nova Scotia, Canada
- Region served: Nova Scotia
- Formerly called: Nova Scotia Game and Inland Fishery Protection Society

Halifax Wildlife Association (HWA), formerly known as the Nova Scotia Game and Inland Fishery Protection Society, is a Canadian wildlife conservation organization based in Halifax, Nova Scotia. Established in 1853, it is one of the oldest, if not the oldest, wildlife organizations in North America—predating the Boone and Crockett Club.

== History ==
The Halifax Wildlife Association was originally founded by Capt. William Chearnley on 18 March 1853, with him serving as its first president. It mainly consisted of British army and navy officers stationed at the Halifax garrison. Then known as the Provincial Association for the Protection of the Inland Fisheries and Game of Nova Scotia, the organization was concerned with wildlife conservation and operated as a game commission for the Colony of Nova Scotia. For many years, the Society took the lead in preserving Nova Scotia's wildlife and was key in developing and implementing hunting regulations.

Chearnley worked with Halifax naturalist Andrew Downs and British Army officer Campbell Hardy to outline its regulations in 1864. Passed on 10 May 1864, the Laws of Nova Scotia relating to the Protection of Fish and Game introduced measures for managing river fisheries. Chearnley continued as president into the mid-1860s, alongside James Thomson as co-vice-president. Among the organization's council were founding member William Harrington, longtime contributor George Piers, Col. R.A. Clifford, Capt. H.W. Clerke, William Finlay, Frederick Blaiklock, W.R. Corballis of the 17th Regiment of Foot, and R.A. Jesson. William Chamberlain Silver served as treasurer, while J.H. Duvar held the role of secretary.

Moose, deer, hares, and foxes were hunted for sport during specific seasons in the province. In 1884, Nova Scotia implemented hunting regulations requiring nonresidents to obtain a $30 license for hunting moose and other game and a $10 license for hunting birds. However, officers in Her Majesty's service could obtain a license for a reduced fee of $5, while members of the Game and Inland Fishery Protection Society were fully exempt from these fees.

Matters relating to the protection of birds and game were entrusted to the Game and Inland Fishery Protection Society. The society influenced the province's 1887 Game Act, which significantly expanded its authority. The act allowed private citizens to present affidavits regarding illegal hunting, granting them powers of search and seizure. Additionally, the society benefited financially, receiving 80% of license fees and half of the fines collected from convictions. Soldiers from the Halifax garrison who were society members were exempt from hunting and fishing license requirements. These provisions further shaped the province's wildlife management policies, often to the detriment of rural residents who faced stricter enforcement of hunting laws.

The Game and Inland Fishery Protection Society of Nova Scotia imported 18 pheasants in 1893 and set them free in selected areas within the province.

Amendments to an act relating to the Preservation of Useful Birds and Animals were passed on 12 February 1894. The provision granted the Game and Inland Fishery Protection Society significant authority in Nova Scotia's wildlife management. Under the act, the society was legally empowered to appoint agents across the province to sell hunting licenses and enforce hunting regulations. These agents, acting under the society's seal, were responsible for preserving bird and animal populations and ensuring compliance with the law. Additionally, the society retained the right to remove and replace agents as needed. With approval from the Provincial Secretary, these agents were officially recognized as officers of the society, further solidifying its control over the regulation and enforcement of game laws in Nova Scotia.

In 1896, under revised laws, society members who were army or navy officers, residents of Nova Scotia, or employees of the provincial or Canadian government were exempt from nonresident hunting license fees. Additionally, nonresidents who were society members and paid at least $20 in real estate taxes were also granted exemptions. These provisions reflected the society's influence in advocating for regulated hunting while ensuring certain individuals, particularly those with vested interests in conservation or land ownership, were not subject to the same restrictions as other nonresidents.

When Nova Scotia's moose population was threatened with extinction due to the practice of hunting them with hounds, the Game and Inland Fishery Protection Society intervened, successfully putting an end to the practice and preserving the province's valuable sporting resource. However, as the number of hunters increased and modern repeating rifles became more common, the society's resources and patrol capabilities could not keep up. With insufficient funds to properly patrol the woods, the game laws were increasingly ignored, leading to widespread complaints across the province. In response to this growing issue, in 1908, the government took control of administering the Game Act, removing the responsibilities from the society and placing them under the oversight of a commission headed by Chief Game Commissioner James A. Knight. The Board of Game Commissioners, with three members, was established on 16 April 1908 and appointed to take over duties formerly exercised by the society. The board appointed wardens (or game commissioners) to supervise the enforcement of the game laws within the Province of Nova Scotia.

In the early 1900s, the Nova Scotia Game and Inland Fishery Protection Society was led by President Col. H.W. Clerke, former private secretary to the Lieutenant Governor of Nova Scotia. The vice presidents were H.N. Wallace and L.G. Power, both of Halifax. George Piers, also of Halifax, served as secretary, while C.S. Harrington held the position of Chief Game Commissioner. The society's commissioners included fishery overseer A. O. Pritchard (New Glasgow), Donald Ross (Margaree, Cape Breton Island), W.S. Crooker (Queens County), and Albert Bigney (Cumberland).

By 1906, Lawrence Geoffrey Power presided over the Game and Inland Fishery Protection Society, with Piers as secretary (later replaced by Harris S. Tremain).

Later changing its name to the Halifax Wildlife Association, its 150th anniversary was commemorated with a memorial in the Halifax Public Gardens in 2003.
