= Christiana Morris =

Mi'kmaq crafts person

- Born: Mali Christianne Paul Mollise ca. 1804; Nova Scotia, Canada
- Died: ca. 1886; Nova Scotia, Canada
- Known for: Quillwork
- Spouse: Tom Mollise

Christiana Morris (c. 1804–1886) was a Mi'kmaq crafts person, known for her skill at porcupine quillwork, as well as her respected position in 19th century Halifax, Nova Scotia.

== Biography ==
Christiana Morris was the anglicized name for Mali Christianne Paul Mollise. She was born ca. 1804 in the Stewiacke area of Nova Scotia. At a young age Morris wed Tom Mollise, a man much older than she, who died shortly after the marriage. Although she never remarried, she did adopt a son, Joe, and took in an orphaned niece.

Morris was known to two Commissioners of Indian Affairs; Joseph Howe and Col. William Chearnley. Morris was granted a piece of land in Halifax after presenting Queen Victoria with a pair of quillwork moccasins. Some of the several examples of anonymously crafted Mi'kmaw quillwork and clothing in the British Royal Collection are likely Morris' work.

Morris exhibited in Nova Scotia Provincial Exhibitions in 1845, 1854, and 1868. She won several prizes for her work, including, in 1854, First Prize for best full-sized birch bark canoe. Morris' large body of work is now represented by just two pieces: a wooden hooded cradle decorated with quillwork panels and a pair of snowshoes made for a mayor of Halifax. The former work is housed in the DesBrisay Museum, in Bridgewater, Nova Scotia and the latter is in the collection of the Nova Scotia Museum.

Around Halifax, Morris donned traditional native garb, including a pointed cap. Her outfits provided a showcase for her crafts work. Additionally, she was sought after as a model. Morris died in Nova Scotia, the probable date of her death is 1886.
