= Chebucto Grays =

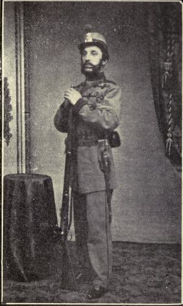
Chebucto Grays, Full Dress Uniform

Chebucto Grays was a volunteer rifle company that was raised in Halifax, Nova Scotia. In the wake of the Crimean War (1853–1856), there developed a Volunteer Force in Britain. As part of this movement, in Nova Scotia, thirty-two Volunteer companies were raised in Nova Scotia, with a total strength of 2,341. In Halifax there were eleven companies with a total strength of 868 men. The Chebucto Grays was the most distinguished company, many of the members belonging to The Halifax Club. The Chebucto Grays were one of eight units to serve in the Halifax Volunteer Battalion.

== Notable members ==
- George Lang
- Brenton Halliburton
- William Blowers Bliss
- Enos Collins
- James William Johnston
- Mather Byles Almon
- John Fitzwilliam Stairs
- Samuel Leonard Shannon
- James Forman (merchant)
- William Young (Nova Scotia politician)
- Philip Carteret Hill
- John William Ritchie

== Gallery ==
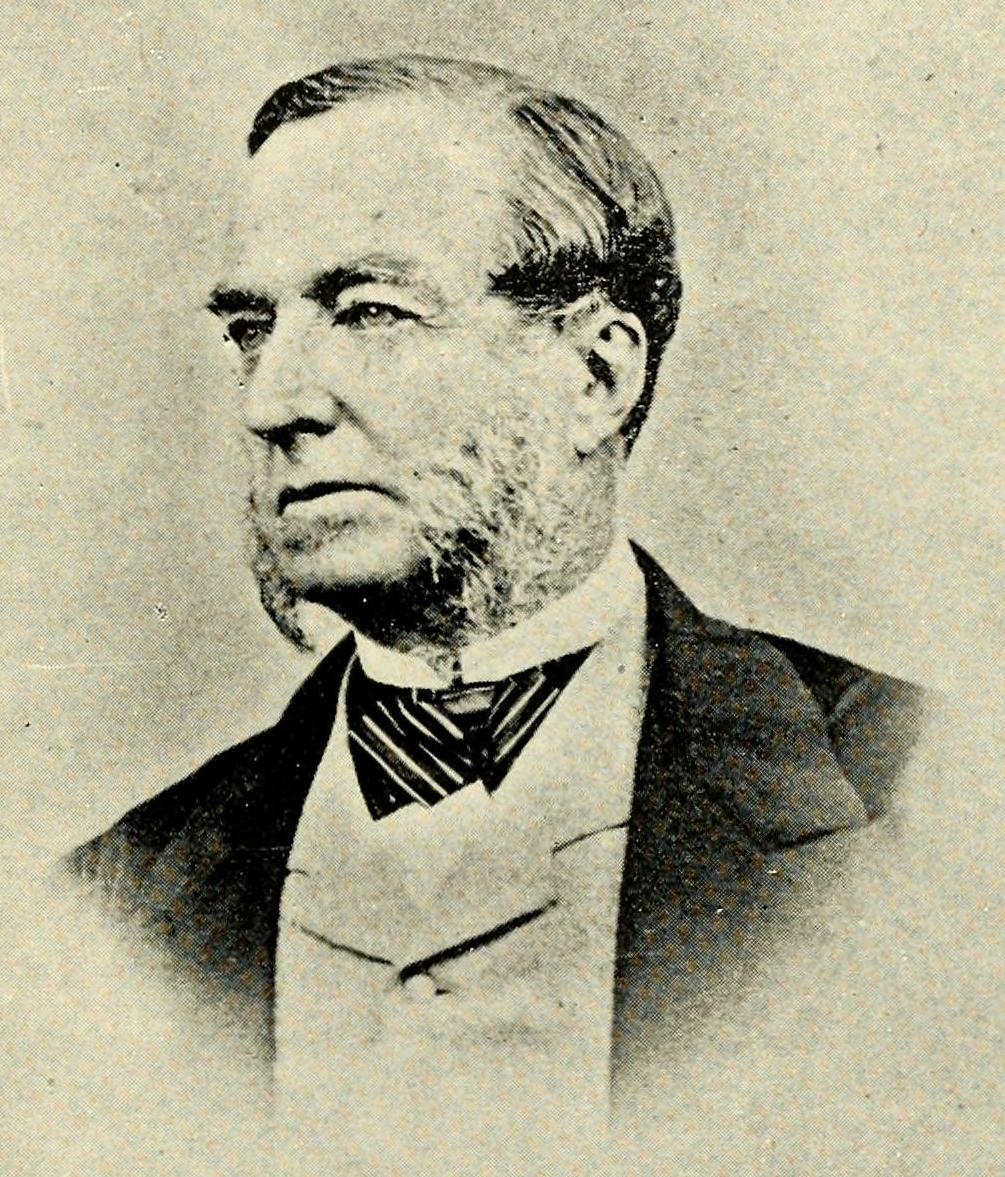
Lt. Col William Chearnley - commander of the Chebucto Grays and "Father of the Halifax Volunteer Battalion"

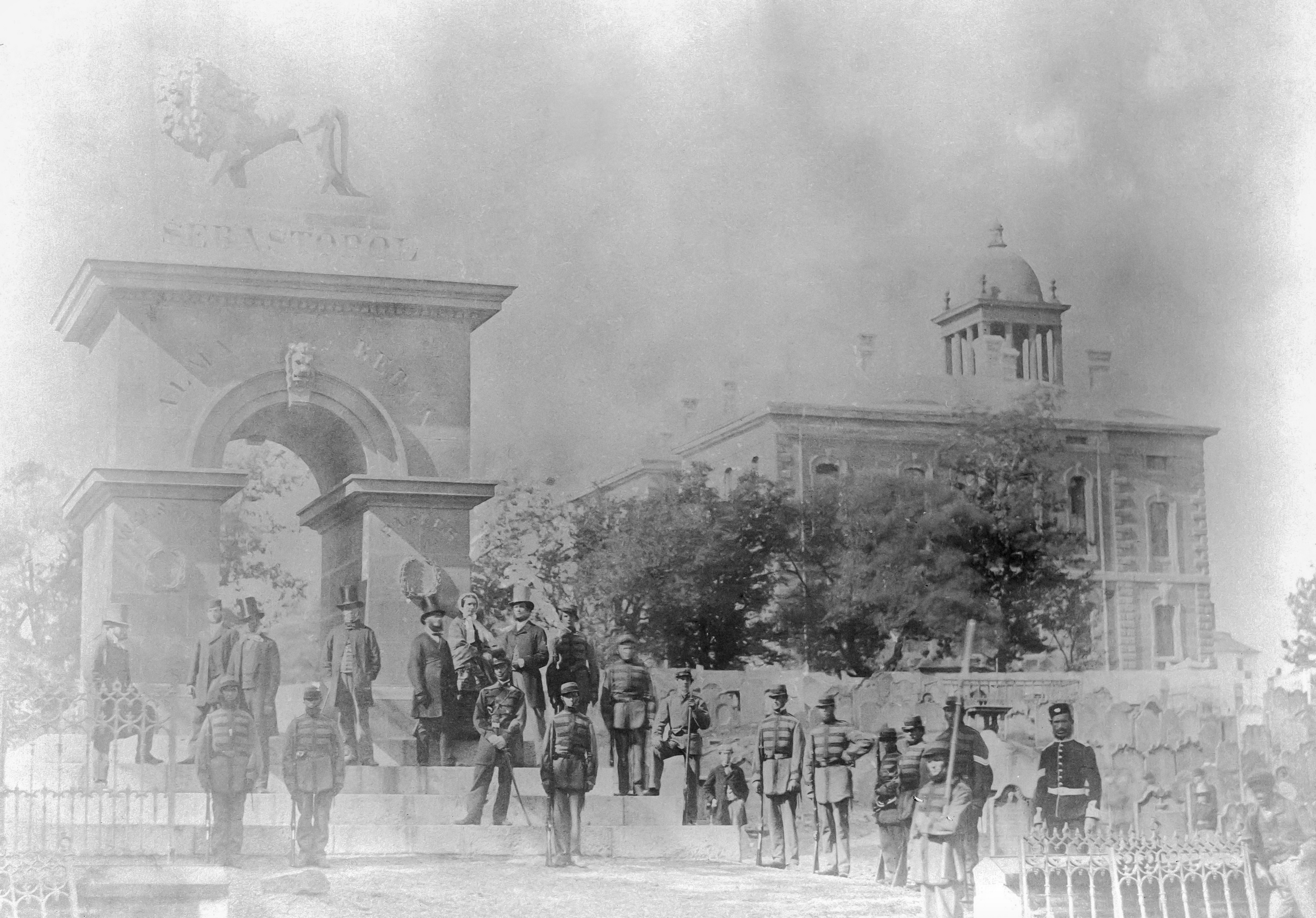
The Welsford-Parker Monument Inauguration - George Lang of Chebucto Grays standing far left in front pair

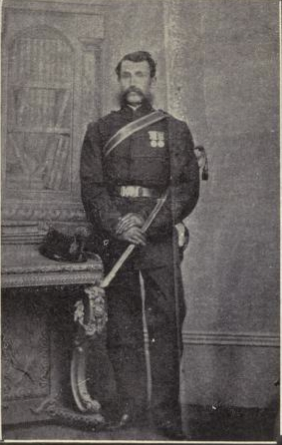
Capt. George Piers, Chebucto Grays (1868)

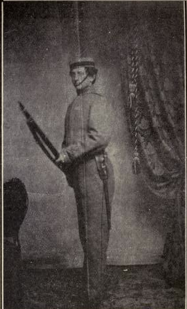
Clifford Kinnear - won the British National Rifle Association Medal (1861)

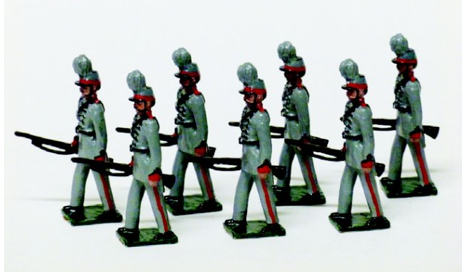
Chebucto Greys Figurines

== See also ==
- Victoria Rifles (Nova Scotia)
- Halifax Volunteer Battalion
