= Welsford, Pictou, Nova Scotia =

Community in Nova Scotia, Canada

Coordinates: 45°44′3.21″N 63°3′10.59″W

Welsford in Nova Scotia

Welsford is a community in the Canadian province of Nova Scotia, located in Pictou County.

It is named after Captain Welsford who died a hero in the Crimean War and was commemorated with the Welsford-Parker Monument.
