= Victoria Rifles (Nova Scotia) =

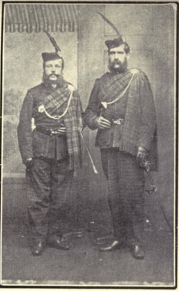
Captain George R Anderson (left), commanding officer of the Victoria Rifles

The Victoria Rifles was a military unit of black soldiers in Halifax, Nova Scotia, that was established in 1860 in the wake of the Crimean War and on the eve of the American Civil War. It was one of the oldest black units established in Canada. On January 30, 1860, at a meeting of the Victoria Rifles, George Anderson was elected Captain and John H. Symonds (First Lieutenant 2nd Halifax Queen's) elected First Lieutenant.

On May 15, 1860, the volunteer companies met at Lieutenant Haliburton's residence to form the Halifax Volunteer Battalion, and a representative of the Victoria Rifles was present. Six companies were chosen for the distinction and five were rejected. The Victoria Rifles company was prevented from becoming part of the Halifax Volunteer Battalion. As an elite Haligonian later observed of the Rifles: “The other companies would not allow them to come near them, to mingle with them, in the event of any united movement rendering it desirable to equalize the companies – they must be kept at a distance.”

Despite this exclusion, on June 8, 1860, the anniversary of Halifax’s founding, the Victoria Rifles and the other volunteer companies and regular troops in the city took part in garrison at the North Common. On July 31, 1860, the Victoria Rifles were present at a ceremony at Government House in honour of the Prince of Wales (the future Edward VII). When the Prince arrived in Truro a short time later, the Victoria Rifles formed a guard of honour on the occasion.

February 1861, the Victoria Rifles mustered at Grand Parade and then followed the 63rd Regiment to Government House to present a loyal address. That evening the company attended a lecture at Dalhousie College.

On October 1–2, 1861, the first provincial rifle match was held in Windsor, with members of all battalions and companies in the competition. Under the white commanding officer, Captain Anderson, the Rifles were represented by Corporal G. Liston and Corporal B. Janey, who ranked 13 and 29 respectively out of 31 competitors.

At the competition, a dispute arose between Captain Anderson and Commander Sergeant John Albro of the Chebucto Grays. Albro was described as expressing “himself more forcefully than complimentary to his fellow soldiers”. A court martial on the matter sided with Albro, and Anderson resigned his position in protest.

== See also ==
- Military history of Nova Scotia
- No. 2 Construction Battalion
- Captain Runchey's Company of Coloured Men
- Queen Victoria's Rifles
- Volunteer Force (Great Britain)
- Black Nova Scotians

== Sources ==
- Thomas Egan. History of the Halifax volunteer battalion and volunteer companies: 1859-1887
- Greg Marquis. In Armageddon's Shadow: The Civil War and Canada's Maritime Provinces p. 65 -66
