= Sebastopol Monument =

Triumphal arch that is located in the Old Burial Ground, Halifax, Nova Scotia, Canada

Welsford-Parker Monument
- Canada
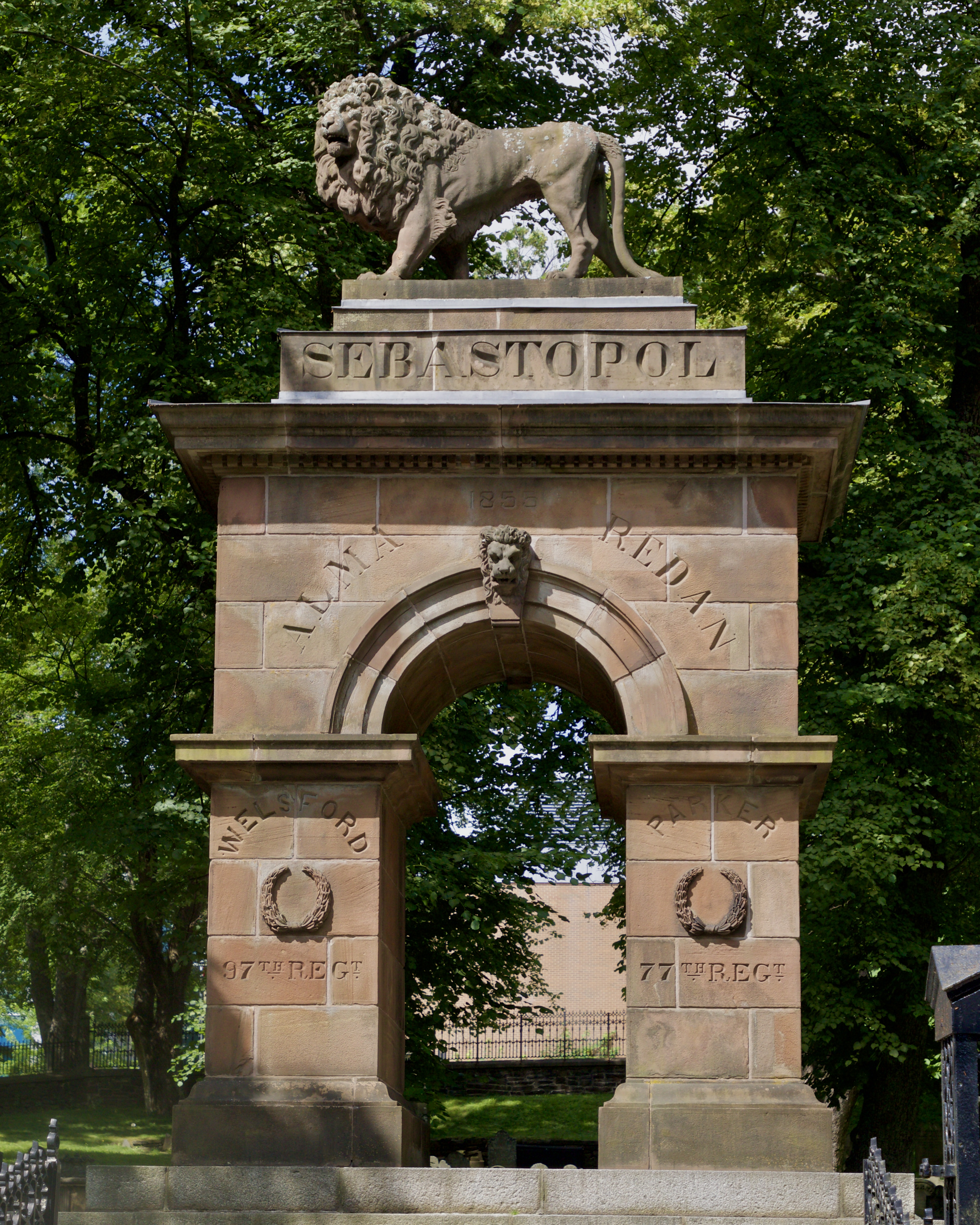
- Sebastopol Monument
- For British victory in the Crimean War and the Siege of Sevastopol
- Unveiled: 1860
- Location: 44.64352°N 63.57248°W; Old Burial Ground, near Halifax, Nova Scotia, Canada
- Designed by: George Lang (sculptor, builder)

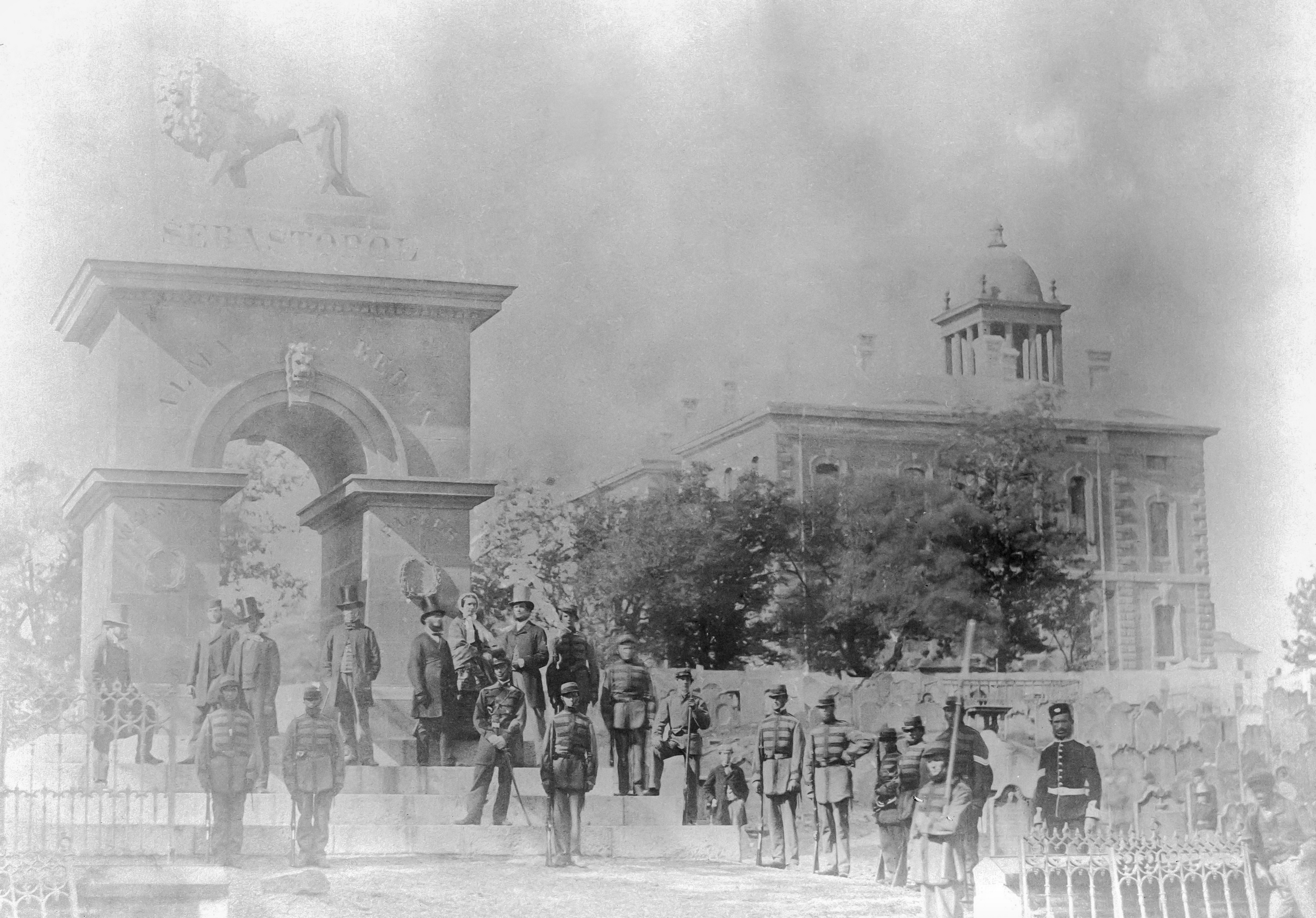
Inauguration of the Sebastopol Monument, 17 July 1860

The Sebastopol Monument (also known as the Crimean War Monument and the Welsford-Parker Monument) is a triumphal arch that is located in the Old Burial Ground, Halifax, Nova Scotia, Canada. The arch commemorates the Siege of Sevastopol (1854–1855), which is one of the last classic sieges of all time. This arch is the 4th oldest war monument in Canada (1860). It is the only monument to the Crimean War in North America. The arch and lion were built in 1860 by stone sculptor George Lang to commemorate British victory in the Crimean war and the Nova Scotians who had fought in the war.

Britain and France invaded Crimea and decided to destroy the Russian naval base at the capital Sevastopol. They landed at Eupatoria on 14 September 1854, intending to make a 35-mile triumphal march to Sevastopol the capital of Crimea, with 50,000 men. To traverse the 35 miles, the British forces fought for a year against the Russians. Inscribed on the monument are names of the battles the British army fought to reach the capital: "Alma" (September 1854), "Balaklava" (October 1854), "Inkerman" (November 1854), "Tchernaya" (August 1855), "Redan" (September 1855), and, finally, "Sebastopol" (September 1855). (During the siege, the British navy made six bombardments of the capital: October 17, 1854; April 9, June 6, June 17, August 17, and September 5, 1855.) The culminating struggle for the strategic Russian port in 1854-5 was the final bloody episode in the costly Crimean War.

During the Victorian era, these battles were repeatedly memorialized. The Siege of Sevastopol was the subject of Crimean soldier Leo Tolstoy's Sebastopol Sketches and the subject of the first Russian feature film, Defence of Sevastopol. The Battle of Balaklava was made famous by Alfred, Lord Tennyson's poem "The Charge of the Light Brigade" and Robert Gibb's painting, Thin Red Line. (Among those treating the wounded from these battles was Florence Nightingale.)

The Nova Scotia memorial also commemorates two Haligonians, Major Augustus Frederick Welsford of the 97th Regiment and Captain William Buck Carthew Augustus Parker of the 77 Regiment, who both died in the Battle of the Great Redan in 1855 during the Siege of Sevastopol (1854–1855), in present-day Crimea which was annexed by Russia in 2014. The monument was unveiled on 17 July 1860. It cost 500 pounds.

During March and April 1855, Nova Scotian Joseph Howe worked tiredlessly to recruit troops for the war effort. Another Nova Scotian, Sir William Williams, 1st Baronet, of Kars also became famous during the Crimean War as Commander during the Siege of Kars. He later became Lieutenant Governor of Nova Scotia.

== Battle at the Great Redan ==
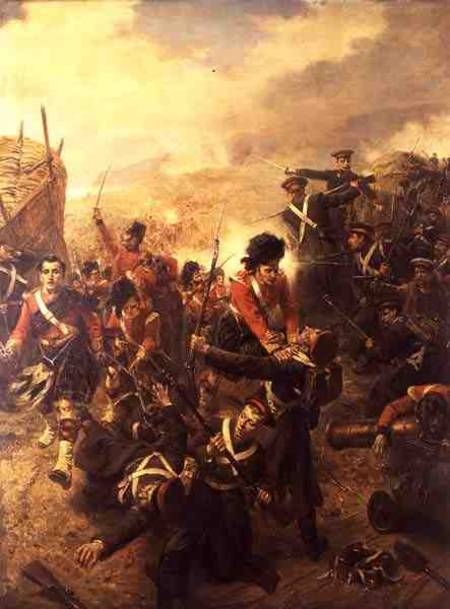
97th Regiment attack on the Great Redan by Robert Alexander Hillingford

Britain, France and Ottomans invaded the Crimea and decided to destroy the Russian naval base at Sevastopol. They landed at Eupatoria on 14 September 1854, intending to make a 35-mile triumphal march to Sevastopol the capital of the Crimea, with 50,000 men. The Great Russian Redan (Bastion #3) was one of the large Russian fortifications that ringed the city of Sebastopol. The Redan was the centre of the defences the British forces were attacking. It became a symbol of the attempt to capture the city and eventually a symbol of its fall.

The British made two unsuccessful attacks on the Redan. The first attack was on 18 June when a massive assault was made on the Redan, but failed. The Allied troops were easily driven back to their fortification where they stayed for the next two and a half months.

During the second siege, the Battle at the Redan, Nova Scotians Welsford and Parker were on the frontline. The attack was directed against the Redan in two columns. General Sir John Campbell led the left attack with 500 men of the 4th Division and a reserve of 800 under Colonel Lord West; Colonel Yea with a similar force from the Light Division led the right. General Campbell on the left was killed before he could get a few yards beyond the parapet of the forward trench.

=== Major Welsford ===
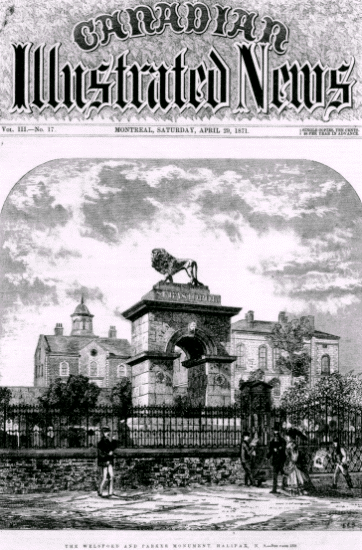
Canadian Illustrated News 29 April 1871

Major Augustus Welsford was a native of Halifax. He attended the Halifax Grammar School. He afterwards went to the University of King's College, Windsor. On leaving college he purchased a commission and was gazetted as ensign to the Ninety-fifth Regiment in February, 1832, became lieutenant in 1834, obtained his company in 1838, and was promoted to a majority in 1850. On the return of the regiment from Corfu about 1848, Major Welsford resumed his acquaintance with his old friends. He was a member of the St. George's Society of Halifax and equally esteemed.

When the 97th Regiment was ordered to England, he accompanied the regiment, and after having spent some little time at Chobham camp went to Greece, in the latter part of the year 1854. Colonel Lockyer having been suddenly promoted to the rank of brigadier-general, the command of the regiment devolved on Major Welsford for some time during the trying winter before Sevastopol.

The Ninety-seventh had furnished 360 men – 160 for the ladder, and 200 for the storming party. The former were under the command of Major Welsford, who had always been ambitious to take a foremost part in the assault. As early as six o'clock a.m. the regiment paraded, and each party marched to their respective stations. Eight men were told off to each ladder, and they had orders only to leave the trench when the appointed signal was given from the Malakoff.

Major Welsford waited six hours before the French were victorious. He ordered "ladders to the front." The troops rushed toward the Redan, and reaching the deep ditch, placed their ladders and scaled the parapets in the face of a murderous fire. The storming column followed on. As Welsford led his men, and was endeavouring to enter the ranks, his head was severed from his body. "It was a bitter hour for us all" wrote one of the Sergeants of his regiment," when the poor Major's body was brought back to us. Had he lived he would have been crowned with laurels. Let us hope he has won a brighter crown now."

=== Captain Parker ===
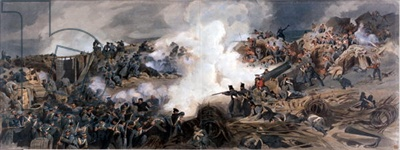
Storming of The Great Redan, Sevastopol 1855

Captain William Parker was born in Lawrencetown, Halifax County, Nova Scotia, was educated at the Horton Academy, and obtained a commission in October 1839. He was gazetted as Ensign to the same regiment in which his father had obtained his company, and was for a short time stationed at Halifax. He was a member of the Saint George's Society. In February 1843, Parker became Lieutenant, and was transferred to the Seventy-eighth Highlanders. For twelve years he served in India, and was promoted as Captain to the Seventy-seventh Regiment in January 1855. He enjoyed this rank for only a few months.

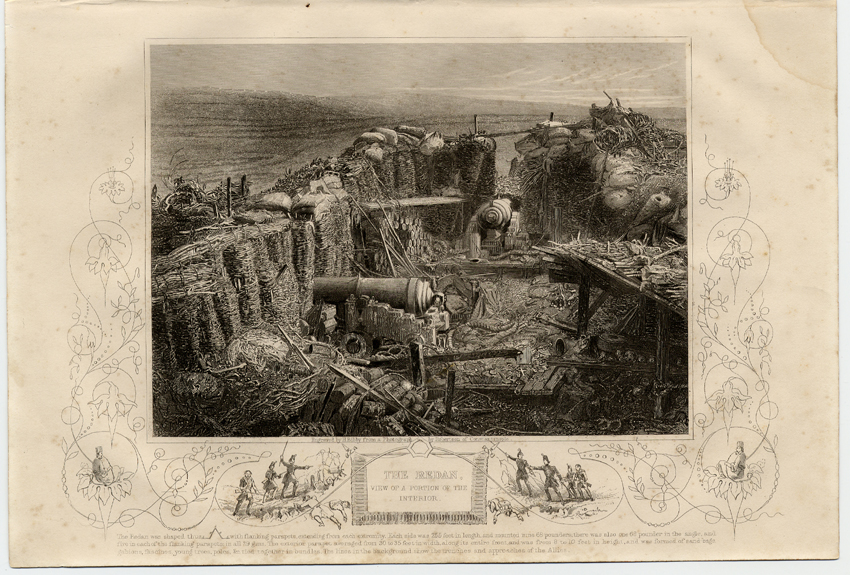
Photo of the Great Redan after abandoned by the Russians by James Robertson

On September 3 he accompanied Captain Pechell of the same regiment to post some sentinels in the advanced trench near the Redan; the whole party, with the exception of Captain Parker and one man, was killed by the enemy. As he sent this man to report the circumstance, a number of Russians rushed out from the ranks to make him a prisoner, whereupon he ably defended himself, shooting two of them with his revolver, and eventually succeeding in bringing into the camp the body of his friend.

For his conduct on this occasion he is said to have received the thanks of General Raglan commanding the Light Division, and was recommended for the Victoria Cross. "This brave soldier fell in the final attack on the Redan on September 8, in the thirty-fifth year of his age, leaving a widow and three infant children to lament his death."

The Russians abandoned the Great Redan in the early morning of 9 September.

== Nova Scotians in the Siege of Sevastopol ==
- William Hall (VC) - Hall fought in the Crimean War serving ashore in a Naval Brigade from HMS Rodney at the battles of Inkerman and Sebastapol in 1854.
- William Blackman - HM 62nd Regt. - fought in the Battle of the Great Redan, the Battle of the Quarries, and the Siege of Sebastopol.
- John Wimburn Laurie - served in 4th Kings Own Regiment in Crimea (1855) and Mauritius (1857) on his way to India (1858).
- Hedley Vicars - See Memorials of Captain Hedley Vicars (stationed in Halifax 1851–53)

=== Admirals stationed In Halifax ===
Four Commanders-in-Chief, North American Station who were in the Siege and later resided in Halifax at the Admiralty House:

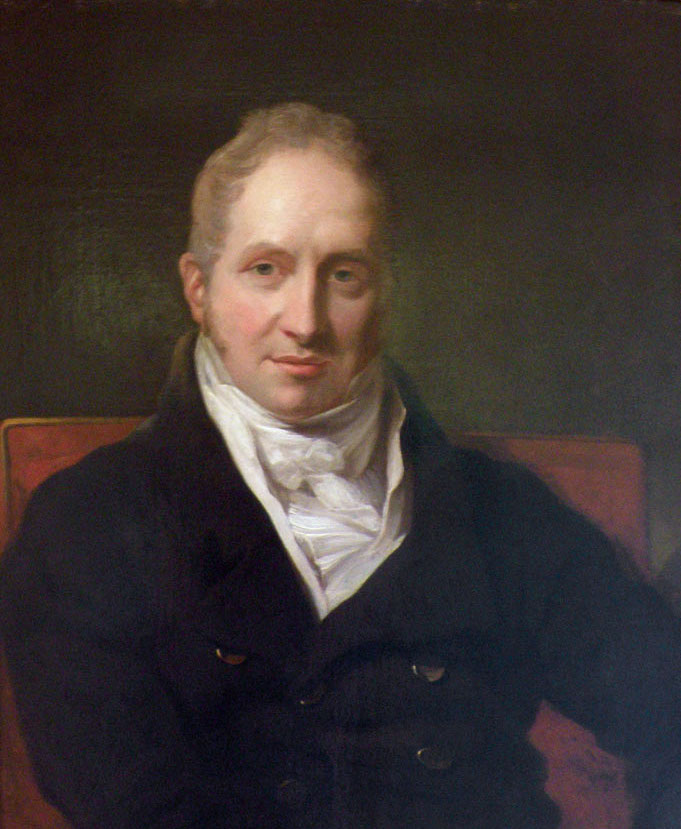
Houston Stewart, served at Halifax (1856–60)

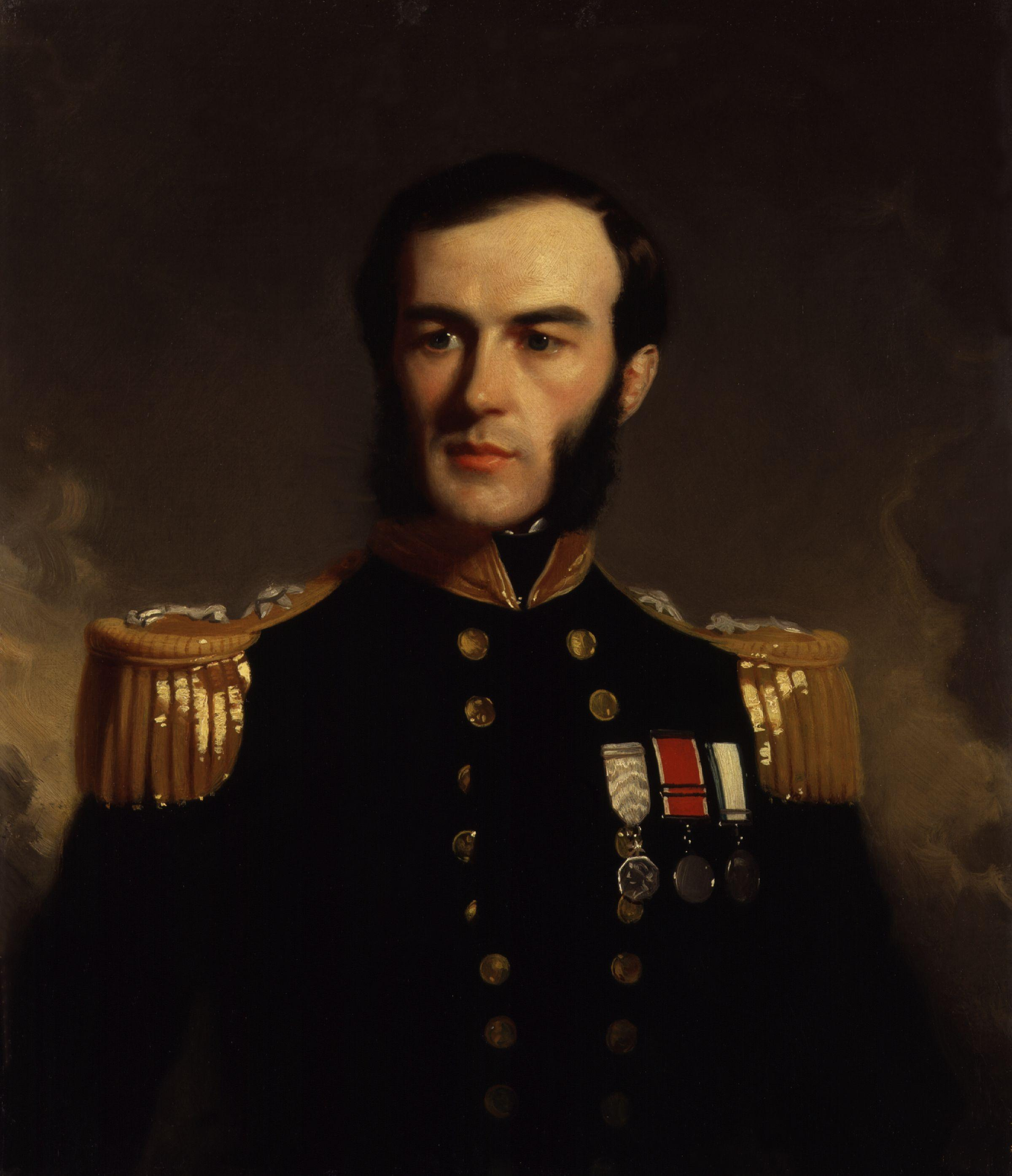
Edward Augustus Inglefield, served in Halifax (1878–79)

John Edmund Commerell, Commerell was awarded the Victoria Cross for the soiege; served at Halifax (1882–85)

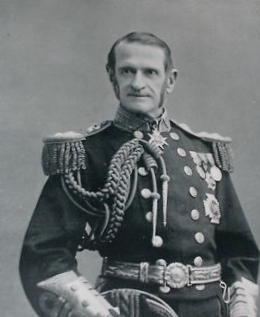
Algernon Lyons, served at Halifax (1886–88)

== Legacy ==
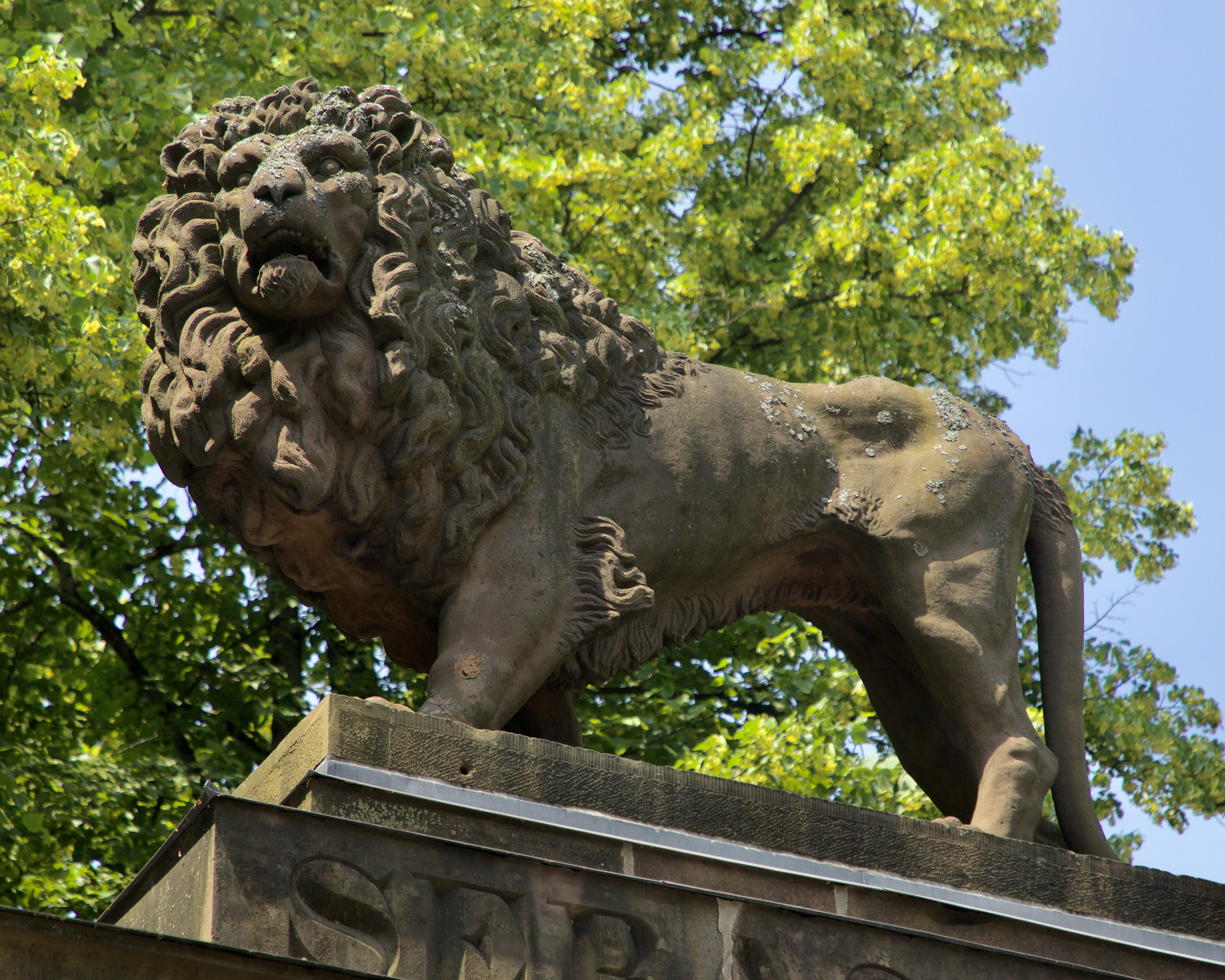
Sandstone lion sculpted by George Lang

The builder of the Sebastopol Monument George Lang also built the Dominion Building in Halifax (what is now the Art Gallery of Nova Scotia). The larger-than-life twelve-ton lion stands atop the Roman triumphal arch created from Albert County, New Brunswick, sandstone. The arch and lion were carved by George Lang. When describing the lion in 1914, the provincial archivist Harry Piers wrote that Lang had "chiselled a little too much at it, and got it a trifle too small," though few are likely to notice today.

The monument was unveiled on 17 July 1860. The ceremony was attended by all the Halifax and Dartmouth Volunteer Companies, particularly those of the Halifax Volunteer Battalion, a large number of the Masonic body, and various public officials. Lieutenant Governor Lord Mulgrave; Rev. George Hill, the orator of the day; Major General Charles Trollope; and Rear Admiral Sir Alexander Milne, 1st Baronet, also made a few remarks.

Major Welsford is also the namesake of Welsford, New Brunswick; Welsford in Pictou County, Nova Scotia; and Welsford in Kings County, Nova Scotia. (Alma, New Brunswick, and Alma, Nova Scotia, are named after the Crimean War Battle of Alma.) Welsford Street and Parker Street in Halifax (off Windsor St.) are both named in honour of these two men who died in the war. Welsford was also the namesake of the Welsford Rangers (1860–1865) of River John (Welsford Village) in Pictou County, Nova Scotia.

At Kings College, Welsford was a contributor to the incorporated association of the Alumni. Students compete annually for a prize in his name, and as each anniversary of his death occurs they recite his deeds in Latin. The president of the university presents the winning candidate with the Welsford Testimonial Prize (now known as The Almon-Welsford Testimonial Prize), founded by Welsford's friend and classmate Dr. William Johnston Almon.

== See also ==
- Crimean War Research Society
- Military history of Nova Scotia
- Canadian war memorials
