= Isaac Phills =

First black recipient of the Order of Canada

Isaac C. Phills
- Born: January 11, 1896; Saint Vincent, West Indies
- Died: March 9, 1985 (aged 89); Dartmouth, Nova Scotia
- Other names: Henry Isaac Phills
- Occupation: Steelworker
- Awards: Order of Canada

Isaac Henry Phills, OC (January 11, 1896 – March 9, 1985) was a Canadian steel worker and the first Black man to receive the Order of Canada.

== Early life ==
Phills was born in abject poverty in the West Indies before coming to Canada in 1916. He served in the First World War with the 85th Battalion (Nova Scotia Highlanders) of the Canadian Expeditionary Force. The writer Calvin Ruck quotes Phills as saying,

In Sydney after the war started, quite a few Blacks volunteered for active service and were told point blank, "We don't want you. This is a white man's war." However, in 1917, the Canadian Army was up against it. They had lost a lot of men in France. At that point, they were willing to take anyone. Conscription came in, and they took the Blacks and the Whites.

Returning to Sydney, Nova Scotia after his discharge from service he went back to Sydney Steel where he worked for 45 more years and raised a family that included four college graduates.

Phills was active in his community, a member and vestryman of Saint Alban's Anglican Church in Whitney Pier, treasurer of the Ethiopian Community Club and secretary of the Court Washington Ancient Order of Foresters.

== Order of Canada ==
Isaac Phills was awarded the Order of Canada in Canada's centennial year of 1967. Isaac's appointment was in the inaugural list of 90 and was the only person of African descent to be recognised in the first list.

Phills' Order of Canada citation reads in part:

A Cape Breton steel worker of West Indian origin, who raised a large family and despite many difficulties, gave them a good education and start in life and set a fine example in the community.

An article from the Cape Breton Post echoes the citation, stating that Phills, as the first Black man to receive the Order of Canada, is important for the role he played in showing the immigrant community of Whitney Pier that any man could overcome hardship through hard work and determination and build a prosperous life for themselves and their family in a new land.

== See also ==
- Black Nova Scotians

== Bibliography ==
- McCreery, Christopher (2005). The Order of Canada: Its Origins, History, and Development. Toronto: University of Toronto Press, Scholarly Publishing Division. ISBN 978-0802039408.
- Ruck, Calvin W. (1986). Canada's Black Battalion : No. 2 Construction, 1916-1920. Halifax, N.S.: Society for the Protection and Preservation of Black Culture in Nova Scotia. ISBN 978-0802039408. Archived from the original on 2014-02-22.
- Winks, Robin W. (1997). The Blacks in Canada: A History. Montreal: McGill-Queen's Press – MQUP. ISBN 978-0921201007.
