= George Lang (builder) =

Scottish stonemason and master builder (1821–1881)

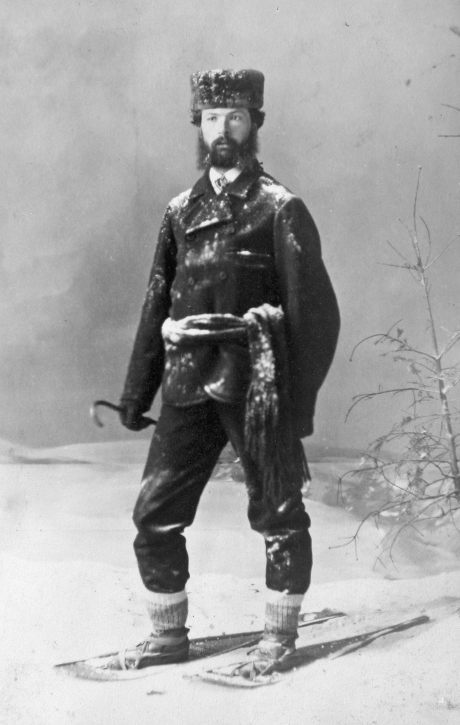
- Born: George Lang; 1821; Roxburghshire, Jedburgh, Scotland
- Died: 2 July 1881 (aged 59–60); Shubenacadie, Hants County, Nova Scotia, Canada
- Notable work: Halifax Court House; Halifax Club; Welsford-Parker Monument

George Lang (1821 – 2 July 1881) was a Scottish stonemason and master builder who built many buildings in Halifax, Nova Scotia during the 19th century.

== Early life ==
Lang was born in 1821 in the historic county of Roxburghshire, Scotland.

== Career ==
Lang was trained in Scotland as a mason, and worked on the Scott Monument in Edinburgh, erected between 1841 and 1846.

At Bishop Edward Feild's request, Lang relocated from Edinburgh to St. John's, Newfoundland, where he joined a group of Scottish masons in the late 1840s to work on the Cathedral of St. John the Baptist, designed by Sir Gilbert Scott.

After some time, Lang joined forces with Scottish-born Canadian architect David Stirling who had also been in St. John's. The pair opened the Albert Freestone Quarries in Albert County, New Brunswick in 1851, where Lang managed operations until 1858.

In 1858, Lang moved to Halifax to join the building industry in the Maritimes. In the previous year, Halifax had passed a law banning the construction of large wooden buildings after a fire ravaged Hollis Street. Between 1858 and 1865, Lang was granted government contracts to construct major public buildings in Halifax. Lang's first major project, the Halifax County Court House, was designed by William Thomas's Toronto-based architectural firm, and built from 1858 to 1860. Lang played a central role in rebuilding Granville Street, a prime commercial district in Halifax, after the block was wiped out by the 1859 Granville Street Fire. He secured the contract for three stores on Granville Street, designed by the Thomas firm.

Lang later carved the triumphal arch and lion of the Sebastopol Monument (also known as the Welsford-Parker Monument) in Halifax's St. Paul's Cemetery. On 17 July 1860, the military monument was unveiled, honoring Captain William Parker and Major Augustus Welsford, Nova Scotian heroes from the Crimean War. Lang, a member of the Chebucto Grays, attended the inauguration.

In 1861, he completed another detailed carving of a stone head for the Mary, Queen of Scots' house, which was built by George Blaiklock on Queen Street. That year, Lang submitted a winning bid of $10,567 for a project of a new engine-house at Richmond station. He later relinquished the contract to John Brookfield due to time constraints and prior commitments to other buildings. Contractors were typically responsible for financing their projects, sourcing supplies and labour, and completing construction within strict deadlines, often with penalty clauses for delays.

Having established himself as a master builder, Lang subsequently teamed up with David Stirling, his former associate who had since become a leading architect in Halifax. Stirling and his partner William Hay designed the Halifax Club, and Lang handled its construction. Lang completed the Italianate stone clubhouse for Halifax's first private social club on Hollis Street between 1862 and 1863. In 1863, he built Keith Hall on Hollis Street based on the designs of Stirling and Hay for Alexander Keith, a brewer and politician in Halifax.

Sustained by numerous commissions and supported by creditor James Forman Jr., Lang managed a workforce, a masons' workshop, carpentry practice, a slate quarry, and a steam engine by the mid-1860s. He also provided building plans, specifications, and jobbing services.

The Government of Nova Scotia commissioned Lang to build the Provincial Building (now the Art Gallery of Nova Scotia) on Hollis Street in 1864 for the General Post Office, Customs House, and Railway Department. Unable to meet the contract terms due to financial difficulties, Lang was replaced by John Brookfield in 1866, who completed the construction of the incomplete building by 1869. Bankruptcy during the Provincial Building project forced Lang to abandon large-scale construction and focus on material supplies and brick-making in 1865. He relocated to Shubenacadie, Nova Scotia, where he and Halifax carpenter James Thompson started a brick-making operation together.

== Death ==
George Lang died on 2 July 1881 in Shubenacadie, Hants County, Nova Scotia, Canada.
