= 85th Battalion (Nova Scotia Highlanders), CEF =

85th Canadian Infantry Battalion, CEF (Nova Scotia Highlanders)
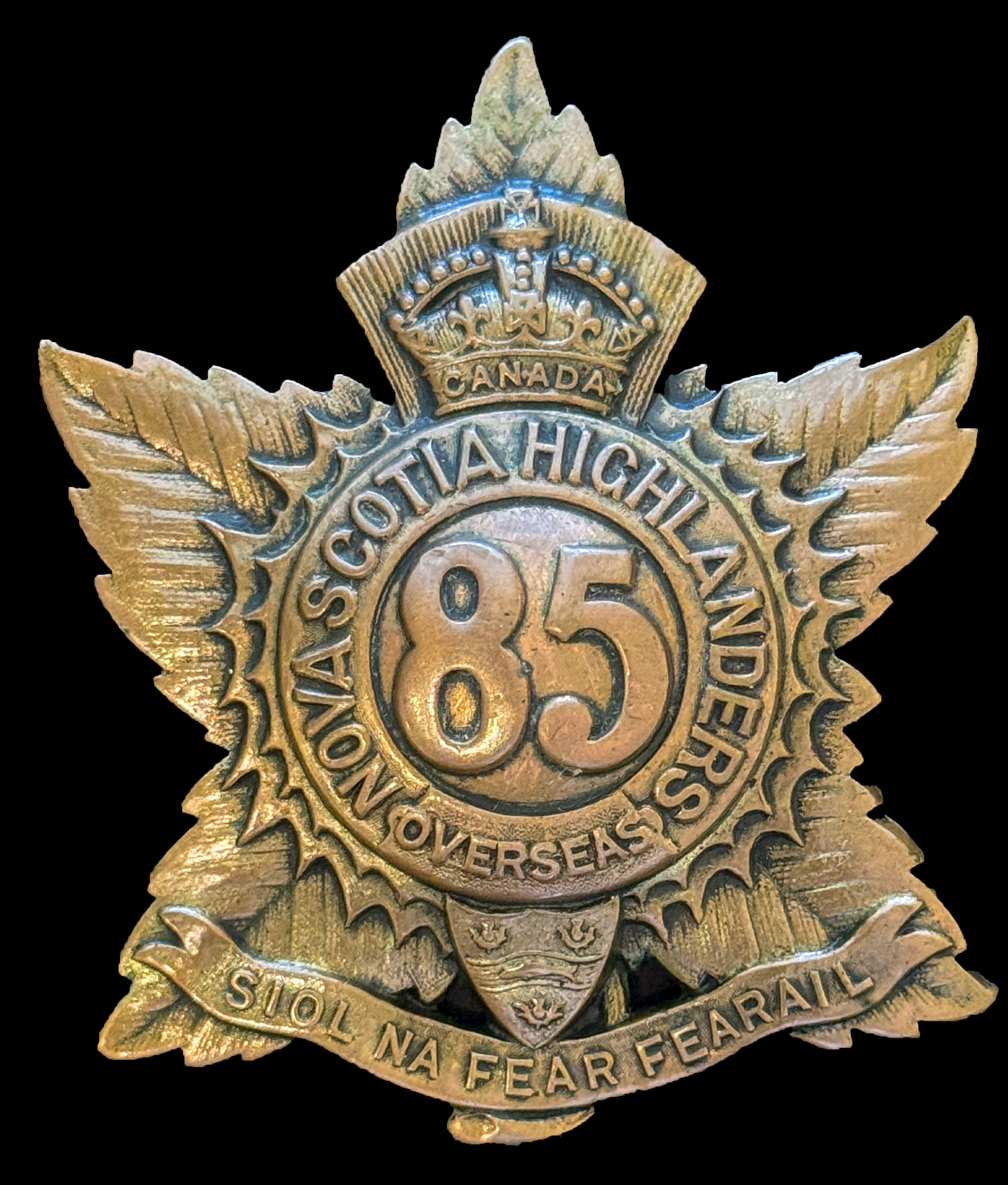
- 85th Battalion emblem, worn as a head dress cap badge
- Active: 1915–1919
- Country: Canada
- Branch: Canadian Expeditionary Force
- Type: Infantry
- Part of: 12th Infantry Brigade, 4th Canadian Division
- Motto: Siol na fear fearail (Breed of manly men)
- Anniversaries: April 9, 1917
- Engagements: Vimy Ridge, Passchendaele, Amiens, Hundred Days Offensive

The 85th Battalion (Nova Scotia Highlanders), CEF, was an infantry battalion of the Canadian Expeditionary Force during the Great War. The 85th Battalion was authorized on 14 September 1915 and embarked for Great Britain on 12 October 1916. Disembarking in France in February 1917, it fought as part of the 12th Infantry Brigade, 4th Canadian Division in France and Flanders until the end of the war. The battalion is most famous for capturing Hill 145 in their first battle. Today, the Vimy Memorial stands on Hill 145.

== History ==
The 85th Battalion was raised in Halifax on 14 September 1915 and it recruited throughout Nova Scotia. The battalion embarked for Great Britain on 12 October 1916, and landed in France on 10 February 1917.

Before the attack on Vimy Ridge the battalion had been used as a labour battalion and had not seen combat. They were the last remaining reserve battalion in the 12th Brigade when all of the ridge had been taken except for the highpoint Hill 145. Since this hill overlooked all of the newly taken Canadian positions it could not remain in German hands. At 6 pm the 85th launched an attack unsupported by artillery due to the closeness of the hill to the Canadians. Ten minutes later the battalion had taken the hill in a ferocious bayonet charge at the cost of 56 dead and almost 300 wounded, many of whom later died.

In May 1919 the city of Edinburgh hosted the battalion with a parade and special dinner. It was intended that the 85th would then tour Scotland but the high command informed them that their boat was ready to take them home. On May 31, 1919, the battalion departed from Liverpool, England, aboard SS Adriatic on its journey home to Canada. A total of 49 officers and 1,800 "other ranks" (including attached New Brunswick and PEI soldiers from other units) were on board. They arrived in Halifax on June 7, 1919.

The battalion disbanded on 15 September 1920.

== Perpetuation ==
The perpetuation of the 85th battalion was assigned in 1920 to 1st Battalion (85th Battalion, CEF), the Cape Breton Highlanders. The king's and regimental colours of the 85th were laid up in the foyer of Government House in Halifax, and as of 2020 they continued to be on permanent display there.

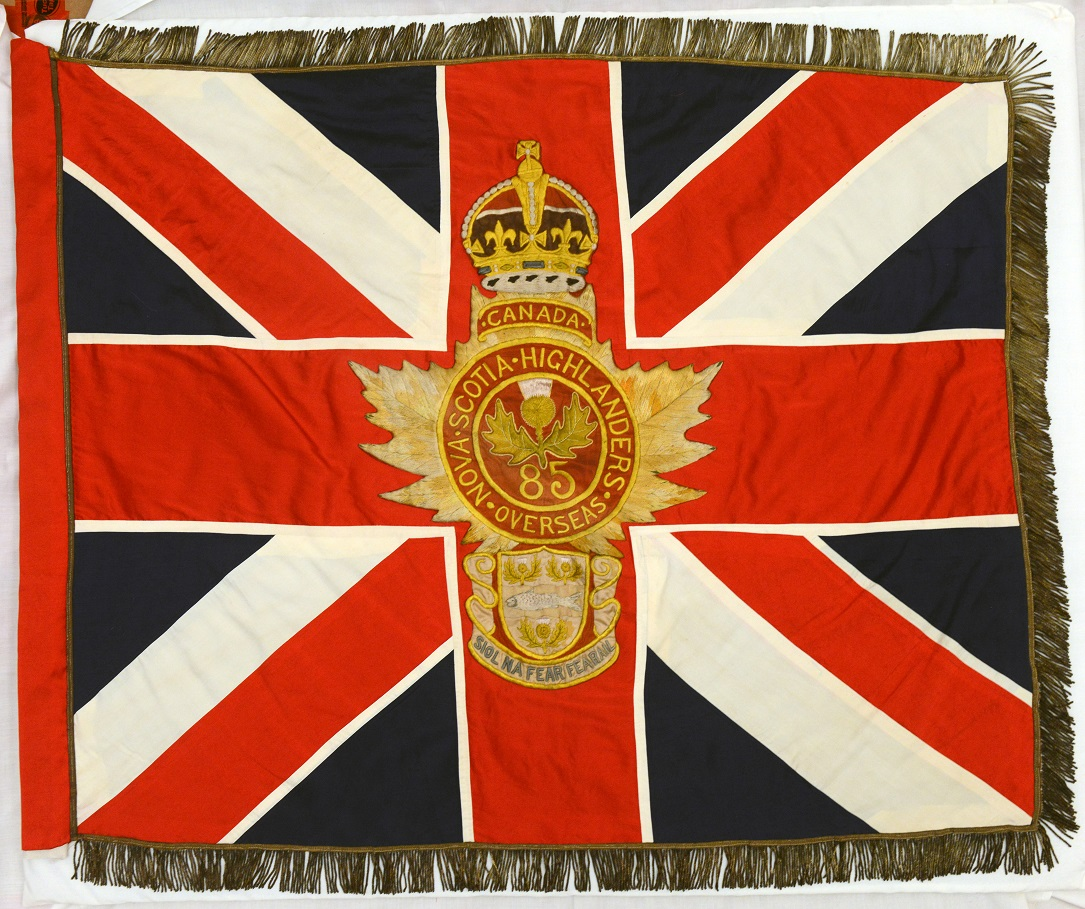
King's colour of the 85th Battalion

== Commanding officers ==
The 85th Battalion had six Officers Commanding:

- LCol A.H. Borden, 12 October 1916 – 6 July 1917
- Maj J.L. Ralston, DSO, 31 July 1917 – 11 September 1917
- LCol A.H. Borden, 11 September 1917 – 26 April 1918
- LCol J.L. Ralston, CMG, DSO, 26 April 1918 – 23 October 1918
- Maj J.M. Miller, DSO, MC, 23 October 1918 – 19 November 1918
- LCol J.L. Ralston, CMG, DSO, 19 November 1918-Demobilization

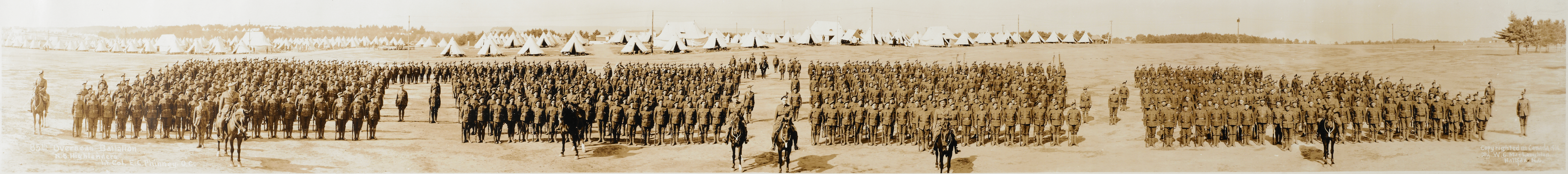

== Battle honours ==
The 85th Battalion was awarded the following battle honours:

- ARRAS, 1917, '18
- Vimy, 1917
- YPRES 1917
- Passchendaele
- Scarpe, 1918
- Amiens
- Drocourt-Quéant
- Hindenburg Line
- Canal du Nord
- Valenciennes
- SAMBRE
- FRANCE AND FLANDERS, 1917-18

== War poetry ==
In 1924, a poetic tribute to the 85th Battalion was composed in Canadian Gaelic by Alasdair MacÌosaig of St. Andrew's Channel, Cape Breton, Nova Scotia. The poem praised the courage of the fallen and told them that they had fought better against the Germans than the English did, while also lamenting the absence of the Battalion's fallen soldiers from their families and villages. The poem was first published in the Antigonish-based newspaper The Casket on February 14, 1924.

== Notable people ==
- William Gordon Ernst
- Isaac Phills

== See also ==
- List of infantry battalions in the Canadian Expeditionary Force

== Bibliography ==
Notes

References

- Hayes, Joseph (2016). The Eighty-Fifth in France and Flanders. WENTWORTH Press. ISBN 978-1-361-99884-7. - Total pages: 414
- Brian Douglas Tennyson, Nova Scotia at War 1914-1919. Halifax: Nimbus, 2017.

== Works cited ==
- Hayes, Joseph (1920). The Eighty-Fifth Canadian Infantry Battalion Nova Scotia Highlanders in France and Flanders. Halifax: Royal Print & Litho Limited.
