= Halifax Club =

Private club in Halifax (1862–2025)

Coordinates: 44.647150°N 63.572797°W

- Formation: 22 January 1862; 164 years ago
- Type: Private club
- Headquarters: 1682 Hollis Street, Halifax, Nova Scotia

The Halifax Club was a private club in Halifax, Nova Scotia that was established in 1862. The club served as a meeting place for business-minded men and women. It was a place where they can "meet, toast the day's successes, dine or simply relax in a warm atmosphere of history and tradition." The club had a substantial art collection including a self-portrait of Benjamin West and a painting by Robert Field. The club was built by George Lang.

== History ==
On January 22, 1862, 15 distinguished gentlemen of Halifax met in the Hollis Street office of Robie Uniacke to organize what was to become known as The Halifax Club. These men, whose names served as a Who's Who of Halifax at that time, were Edward Kenny, William A. Black, Mathers Byles Almon, Edward Binney, Captain W.W. Lyttleton, Colonel W.J. Myers, S.A. White, James C. Cogswell, Henry Pryor, John Tobin, Robert Morrow, Alfred G. Jones, M.B. Almon Jr. and William Cunard. Many of these men were also members of the Charitable Irish Society of Halifax, North British Society and the Chebucto Grays.

After many years of declining membership and financial difficulties, the Club and Building were purchased by developer Steve Caryi in 2015. He continued to operate the club through the Caryi Group, hosting weddings and other events, until his death and subsequent financial problems forced its closure in February 2025.

== Notable members ==
- Sir Robert Borden
- Sir Sandford Flemming
- Thomas Head Raddall
- Alexander Keith (Canadian politician)
- Charles Tupper
- Edward Kenny
- Sidney Culverwell Oland

== Gallery ==
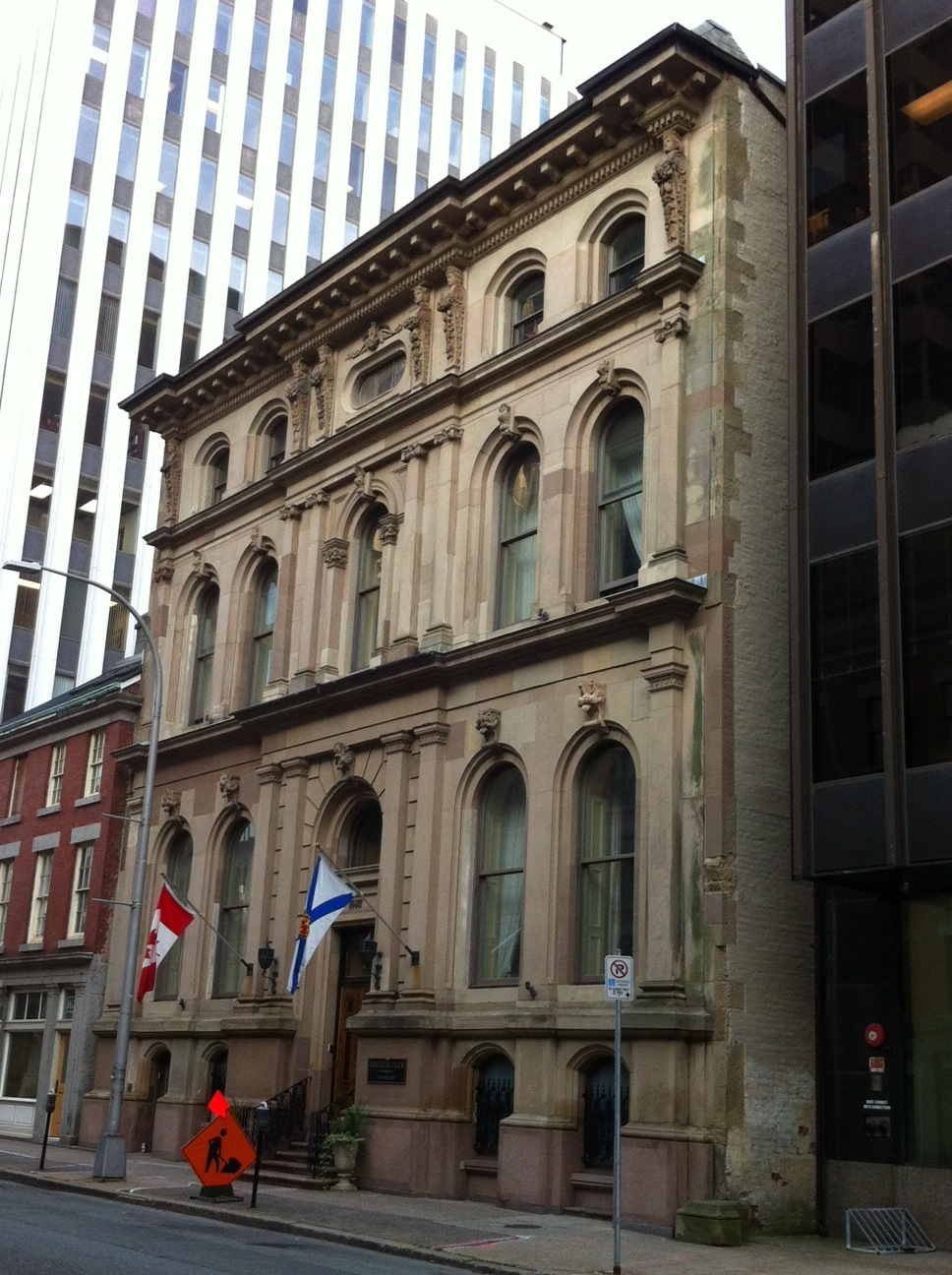
Halifax Club by George Lang (builder)

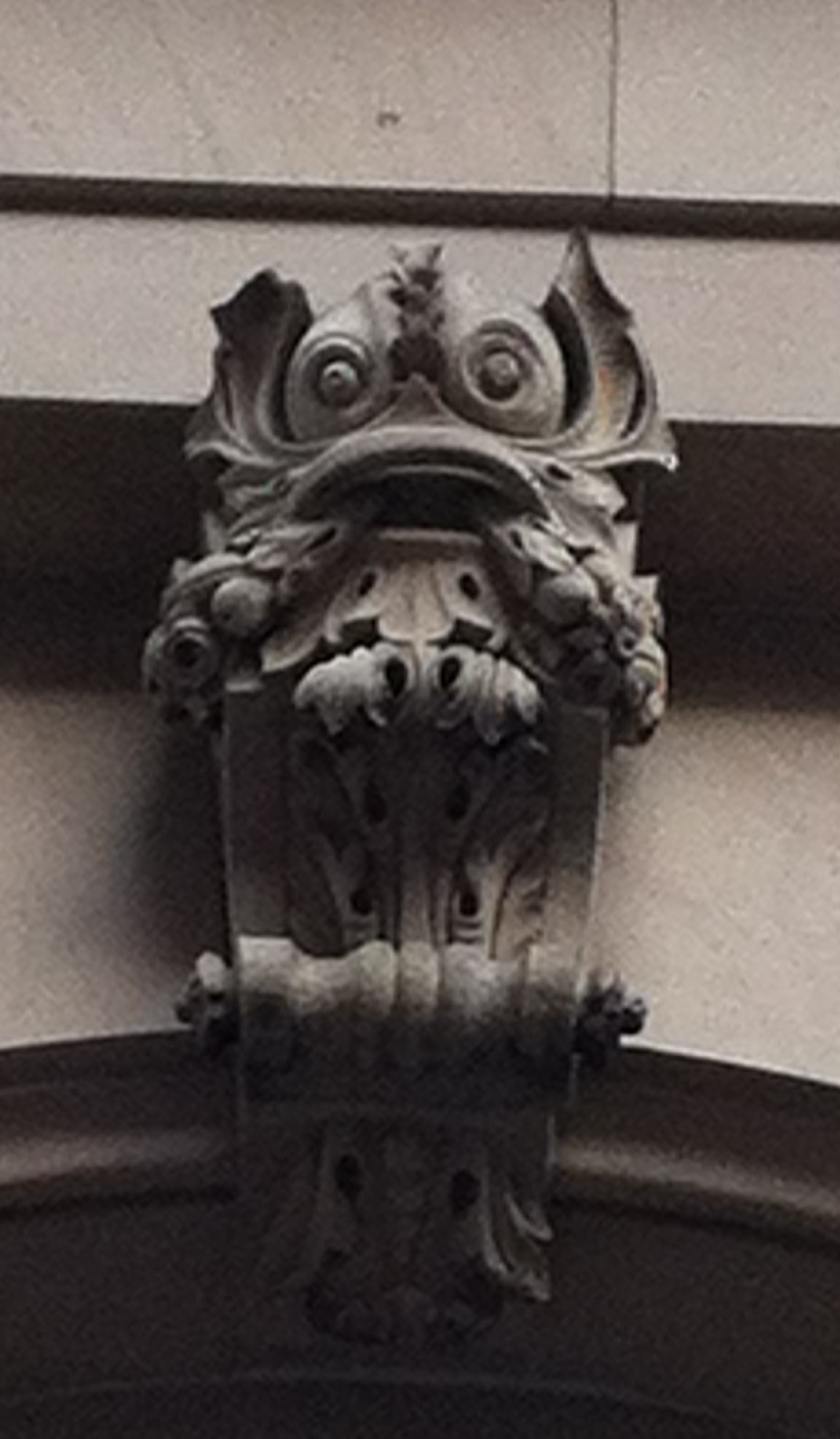
Halifax Club by George Lang (inset)

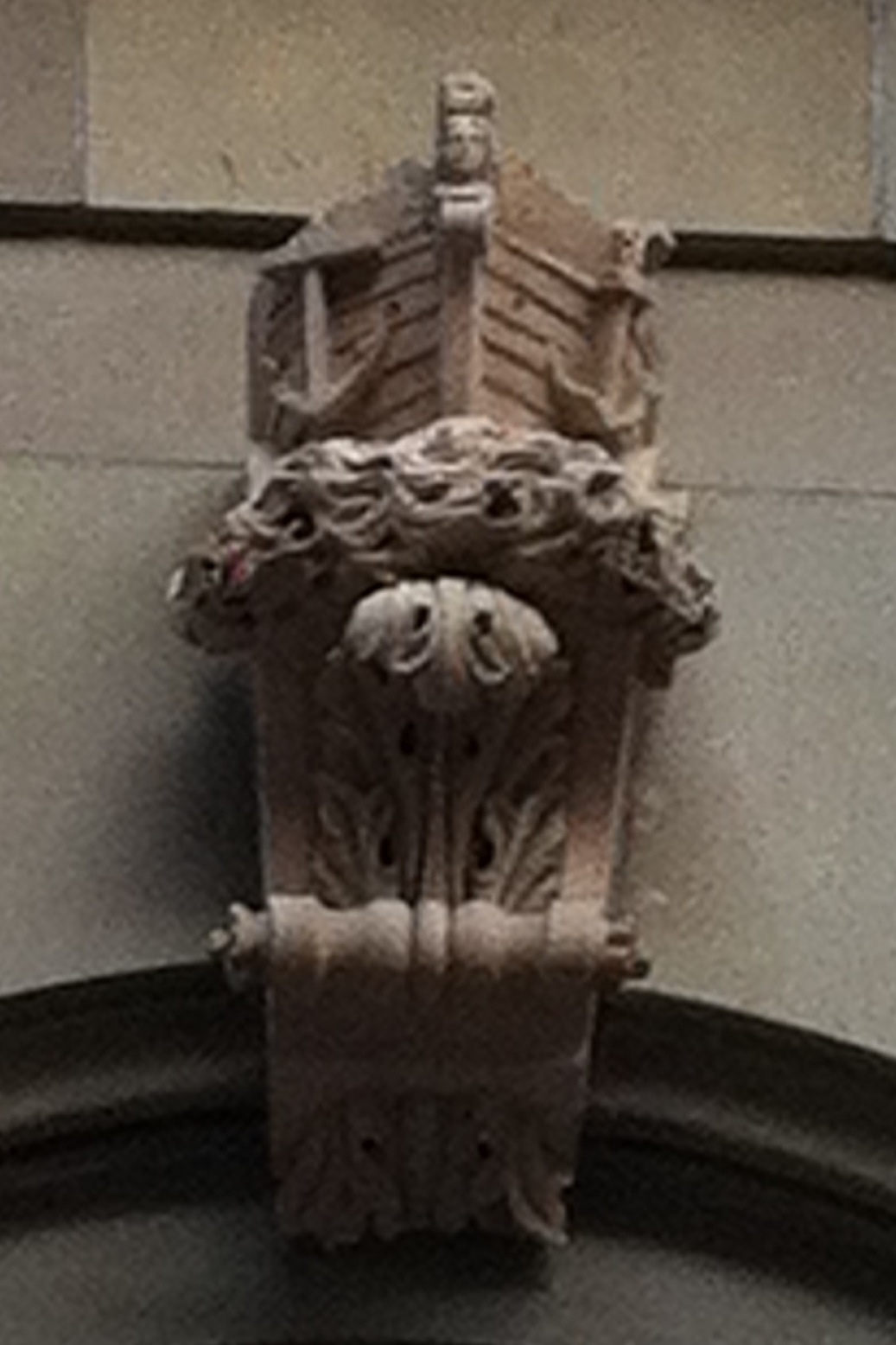
Halifax Club by George Lang (inset)

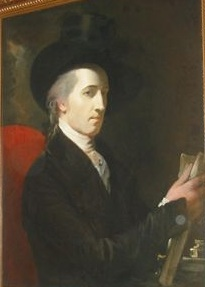
Benjamin West - Self Portrait

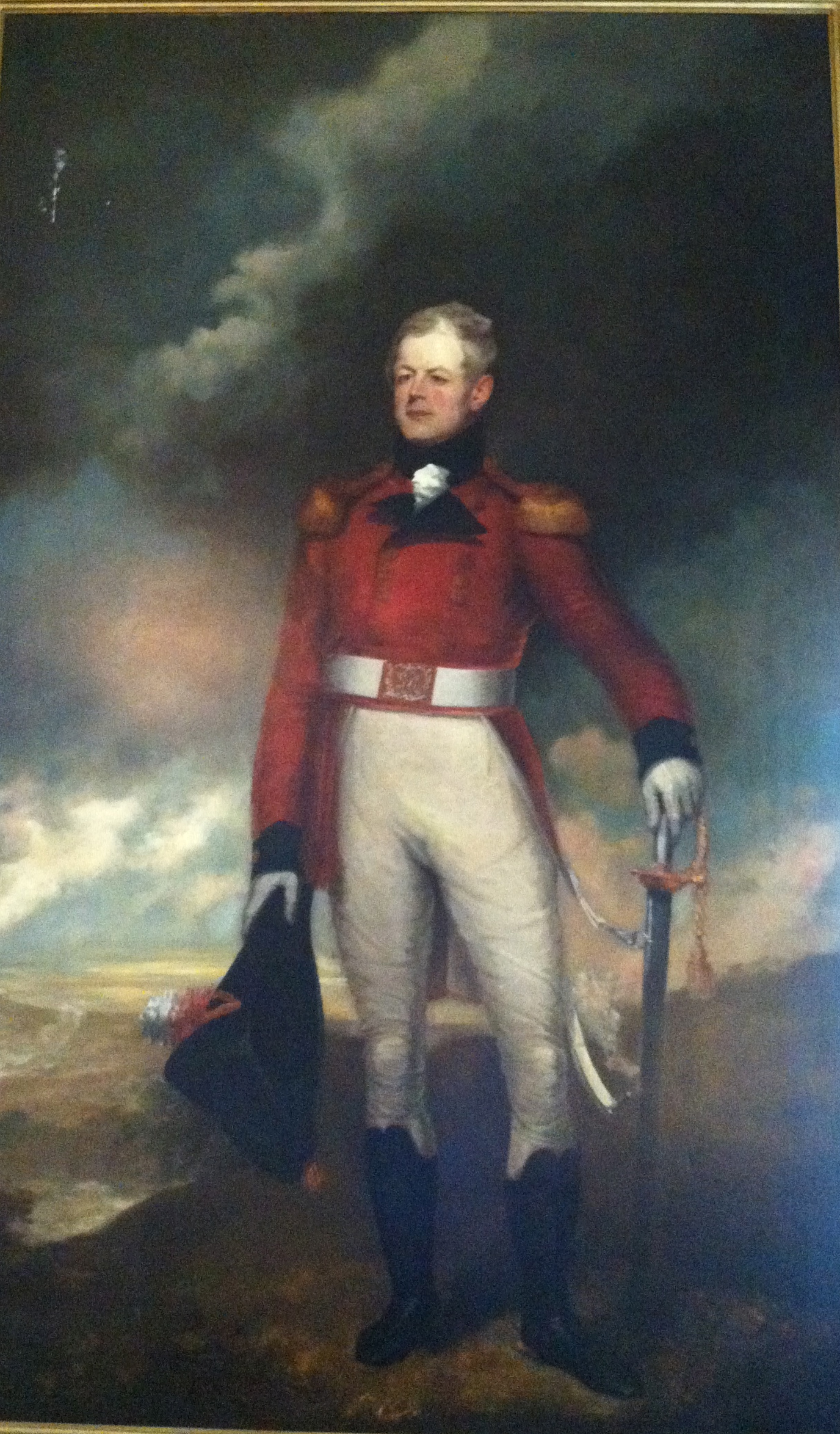
Sir George Prevost with sword from Nova Scotia House of Assembly to commemorate his victory at Martinique. By Robert Field

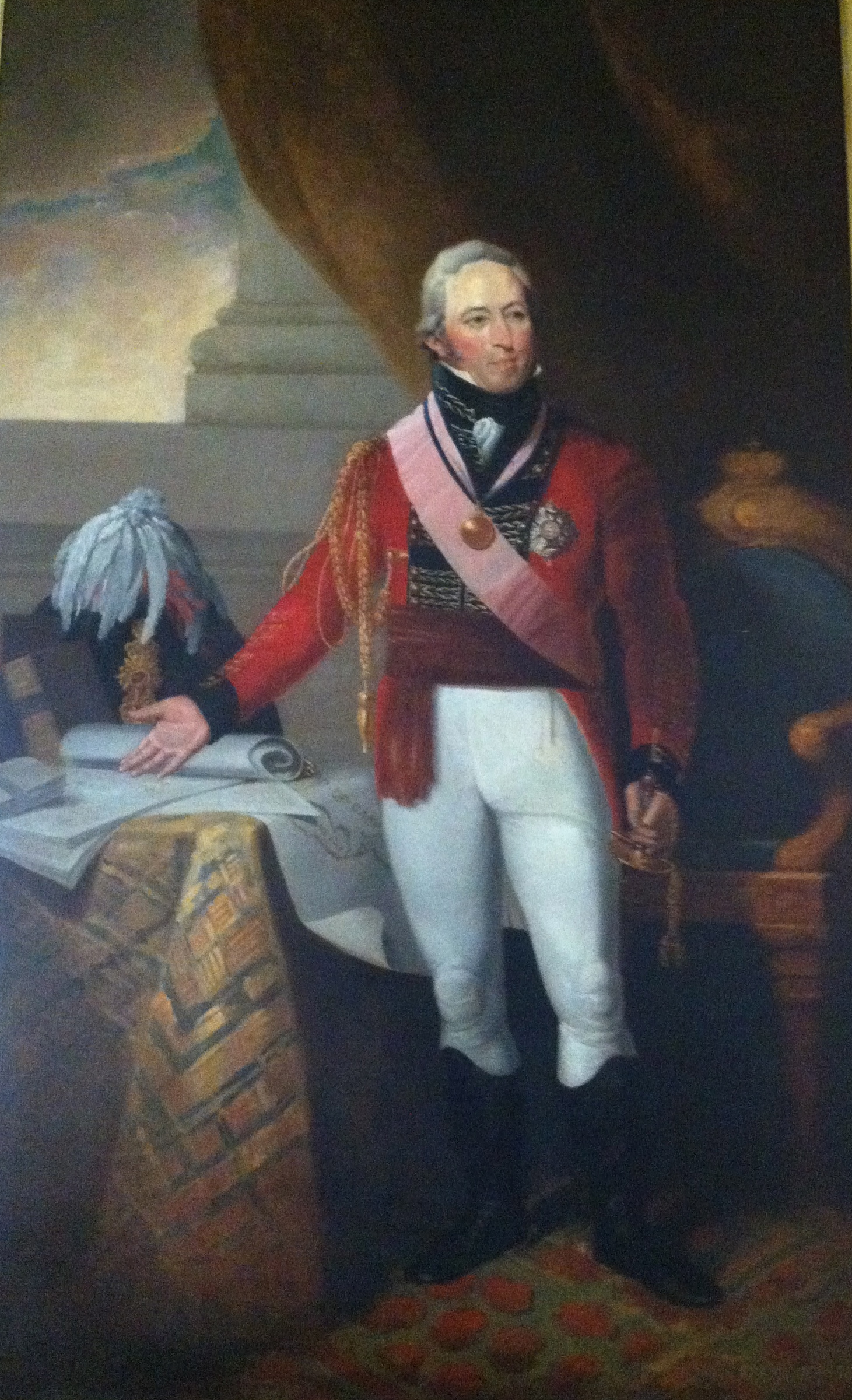
Sir John Coape Sherbrooke, Lt. Gov. of NS (1811–1816) by Robert Field

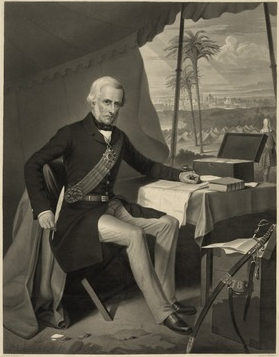
Sir Henry Havelock: Hero of Lucknow

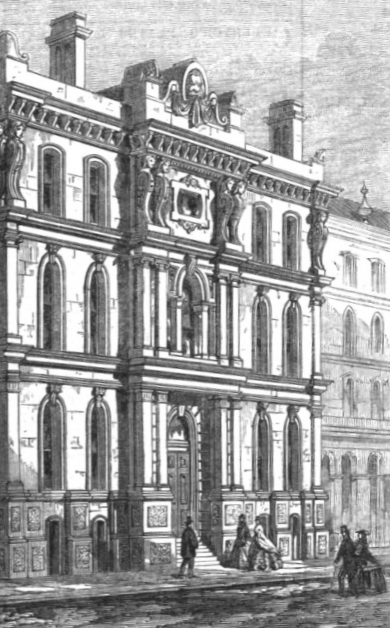
Drawing of the clubhouse that appeared in the Illustrated London News in 1863

== See also ==
- History of Nova Scotia
- List of gentlemen's clubs in Canada
- Military history of Nova Scotia
