= Belcher (surname) =

Belcher is an English surname of Norman origin. Notable people with the surname include:

== Acting ==
- Charles Belcher (actor) (1872–1943), American film actor
- Laurence Belcher (born 1995), English actor
- Marjorie Celeste Belcher (1919–2020), birth name of Marge Champion, American dancer and actress
- McKinley Belcher III (born 1984), American actor
- Patricia Belcher (born 1954), American film and television actress

== Military ==
- Douglas Walter Belcher (1889–1953), English recipient of the Victoria Cross
- Edward Belcher (1799–1877), British naval officer and explorer
- Ted Belcher (1924–1966), American soldier and recipient of the Medal of Honor
- Thomas Belcher (1834–1898), American soldier and recipient of the Medal of Honor

== Music ==
- Daniel Belcher (fl. 1990s–2010s), American operatic baritone
- Diane Meredith Belcher (born 1960), American concert organist, teacher, and church musician
- Supply Belcher (1751–1836), American composer, singer, and compiler of tune books

== Politics ==
- Andrew Belcher (merchant, born 1706) (1706–1771), American merchant and Governor's Council member in the province of Massachusetts Bay
- Andrew Belcher (merchant, born 1763) (1763–1841), British North American merchant and politician in Halifax, Nova Scotia
- Benjamin Belcher (1743–1802), British merchant and politician
- Cornell Belcher, American pollster and political strategist
- Helen Belcher (born 1963), British politician
- Hiram Belcher (1790–1857), American politician in Maine
- Jennifer Belcher (1944–2022), American politician in Washington
- John Belcher (politician) (1905–1964), British politician
- Jonathan Belcher (1682–1757), American merchant, businessman, and politician from colonial Massachusetts
- Jonathan Belcher (jurist) (1710–1776), American-Canadian lawyer and politician
- Larry Belcher (1947–2008), American politician in Kentucky, spouse of Linda
- Linda H. Belcher (born 1948), American politician in Kentucky, spouse of Larry
- Louis Belcher (born 1939), American mayor of Ann Arbor, Michigan
- Nathan Belcher (1813–1891), American politician in Connecticut
- Page Belcher (1899–1980), American politician in Oklahoma
- Robin Belcher (born 1976), American politician in Ohio
- Taylor G. Belcher (1920–1990), American diplomat who served as ambassador to Cyprus and Peru

== Religion ==
- John Belcher (Methodist preacher) (fl. 1721–1763), Welsh Methodist preacher
- Joseph Belcher (1699–1723), American minister in Dedham, Massachusetts
- Wilfrid Belcher (1891–1963), Anglican bishop

== Sport ==
=== Australian rules football ===
- Allan Belcher (1824–1921), Australian rules footballer
- Norman Belcher (1879–1947), Australian rules footballer
- Vic Belcher (1888–1977), Australian rules football player

=== Baseball ===
- Kevin Belcher (baseball) (born 1967), American baseball player
- Tim Belcher (born 1961), American baseball player

=== Basketball ===
- Cookie Belcher (born 1978), American basketball player
- Earl Belcher (born 1958), American basketball player

=== Cricket ===
- Charles Belcher (cricketer) (1872–1938), English cricketer
- Gordon Belcher (1885–1915), English cricketer
- Samuel Belcher (1834–1920), Australian cricketer
- Thomas Belcher (cricketer) (1847–1919), English cricketer

=== Football (gridiron) ===
- Jovan Belcher (1987–2012), American football player
- Kevin Belcher (center) (1961–2003), American football player
- Kevin Belcher (offensive tackle) (1961–1997), American football player
- Val Belcher (1954–2010), American player of Canadian football

=== Rugby league ===
- Gary Belcher (born 1962), Australian rugby league footballer

=== Rugby union ===
- Liam Belcher (born 1996), Welsh rugby union player

=== Water sports ===
- David Belcher (born 1967), Australian rower
- Friederike Belcher (born 1982), German sports sailor
- Lani Belcher (born 1989), British canoeist
- Mathew Belcher (born 1982), Australian sailor

=== Other ===
- Alan Belcher (born 1984), American mixed martial arts fighter
- Christopher Belcher (born 1994), American sprint athlete
- Fred Belcher (1887–1957), American racecar driver
- James Belcher (1781–1811), English bare-knuckle boxer
- Jimmy Belcher (1932–2023), English footballer
- Kelvin Belcher (1961–2017), American tennis player
- Rod Belcher (1920–2014), American radio play-by-play announcer
- Simon Belcher (born 1973), British racing driver

== Other ==
- Angela Belcher, American biochemist and materials scientist
- Brian Belcher, Canadian social scientist
- Charles Belcher (disambiguation), multiple people
  - Sir Charles Frederic Belcher (1876–1970), Australian ornithologist and British colonial jurist
- Clement Horton Belcher (1801–1869), Canadian bookseller and publisher from Halifax, Nova Scotia
- Cynthia Holmes Belcher (1827–1911), American journalist
- Donald D. Belcher (1938–2018), American business executive
- Ernest Belcher (1871–1949), British assistant general manager of the British Empire Exhibition
- George Belcher (1875–1947), English cartoonist, etcher, and painter
- Hilda Belcher (1881–1963), American artist
- Isaac S. Belcher (1825–1898), American attorney and an Associate Justice of the Supreme Court of California
- John Belcher (disambiguation), multiple people
  - John Belcher (architect) (1841–1913), English architect and writer
  - John E. Belcher, Irish-born Canadian civil engineer and architect
  - John Winston Belcher, American physicist
- Margaret Belcher (1936–2016), New Zealand literary scholar
- Marian Belcher (1849–1898), English educator and school administrator
- Marta Belcher, American technology attorney
- Muriel Belcher (1908–1979), English nightclub owner and artist's model
- Ruth Belcher (1901–2000), birth name of Ruth Dyk, American suffragist, psychologist and author
- William Belcher (1860–1926), New Zealand seaman and unionist
- William J. Belcher (1883–1949), New Zealand and Fijian wildlife artist

== See also ==
- Belcher (disambiguation)
- Belcher family, fictional main characters in the American animated series Bob's Burgers
