= Belcher =

Belcher may refer to:

== People ==
Last name

- Belcher (surname)

Middle name

Listed alphabetically by last name

- Timothy Belcher Dyk (born 1937), American federal judge
- Andrew Belcher Gray (1820–1862), American surveyor
- John Hill Belcher Mason (1858–1919), American stage actor
- George Belcher Murray (1895–1941), Canadian political figure in Nova Scotia

== Places ==
=== Canada ===
- Belcher station, a railway station in Manitoba
- Belcher Channel, a waterway in Nunavut
  - Belcher Channel Formation, a geologic formation
- Belcher Islands, an archipelago in Hudson Bay
- Belcher Mountains, a late Precambrian range in the Hudson Bay region

=== Hong Kong ===
- Belcher (constituency), a constituency in the Central and Western District
- Belcher Bay, on the northwest shore of Hong Kong Island
  - The Belcher's, a residential building near Belcher Bay
- Belcher Station, a former name of HKU station, an MTR station
- Belcher's Street, located in Kennedy Town

=== United States ===
Populated places

- Belcher, Kentucky, an unincorporated community in Pike County
- Belcher, Louisiana, a village in Caddo Parish
- Belcher's Town, Massachusetts, a former name of Belchertown, Massachusetts

Houses

- Belcher Family Homestead and Farm, a historic home and farm complex in Tioga County, New York
- Belcher-Holden Farm, a historic home and farm complex in Tioga County, New York
- Belcher-Rowe House, a historic home in Milton, Massachusetts
- Jonathan Belcher House, a historic house in Randolph, Massachusetts

Other

- Belcher Branch, a stream in West Virginia
- Belcher Camp, a ghost town located in Ferry County, Washington
- Belcher Mound Site, an archaeological site in Caddo Parish, Louisiana

=== Elsewhere ===
- Belcher, Kazakhstan, a village in Yrgyz District, Aktobe Region, also known as Belsher
- Belcher's Bar, a hamlet in Leicestershire, England

== Wildlife ==
- Belcher's sea snake, an extremely venomous species (Hydrophis belcheri)
- Belcher's gull, a bird found along the Pacific coast of South America (Larus belcheri)

== Other ==
- Autoclenz Ltd v Belcher, a landmark court case about labour law in the United Kingdom

== See also ==
- Bechler, a German surname
- Belching
