= John Belcher =

John Belcher may refer to:

- John Belcher (politician) (1905–1964), British Labour Party Member of Parliament 1945–1949
- John Belcher (architect) (1841–1913), English architect and writer
- John E. Belcher (1834–1915), Irish-born Canadian civil engineer and architect
- John Belcher (Methodist preacher) (fl. 1721–1763), Welsh Methodist preacher
- John Winston Belcher (born 1943), American physicist
