= Bechler =

Bechler is a surname of German origin. Notable people with the surname include:

- Karl Bechler (1886–1945), German athlete
- Helmut Bechler (1898–1971), German military officer
- John Christian Bechler (1784–1857), Moravian bishop and composer
- Lynn Bechler, member of the Kentucky House of Representatives
- Steve Bechler (1979–2003), American baseball player

== See also ==
- Belcher (disambiguation), a French surname
- Bechler River, a river in Yellowstone National Park named for Gustavus R. Bechler
- Bechler Falls, a waterfall in Yellowstone National Park named for Gustavus R. Bechler
