= Hill chain =

Elongated line of hills

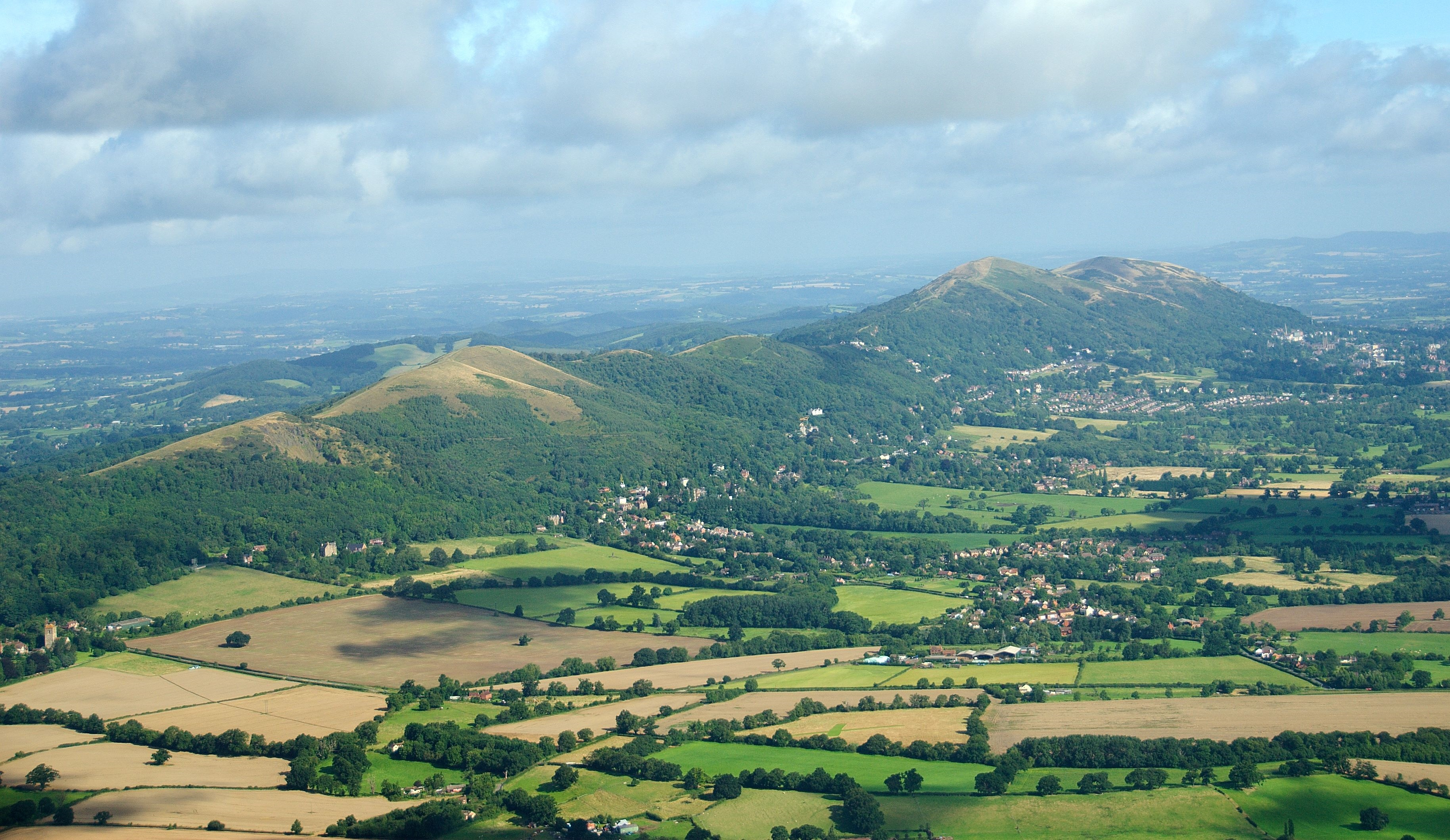
The Malvern Hills, a hill chain rising from the plain in west-central England

A hill chain, sometimes also hill ridge, is an elongated line of hills that usually includes a succession of more or less prominent hilltops, domed summits or kuppen, hill ridges and saddles and which, together with its associated lateral ridges and branches, may form a complex topographic structure. It may occur within a hill range, within an area of low rolling hill country or on a plain. It may link two or more otherwise distinct hill ranges. The transition from a hill chain to a mountain chain is blurred and depends on regional definitions of a hill or mountain. For example, in the UK and Ireland a mountain must officially be 600 m (2,000 ft) or higher, whereas in North America mountains are often (unofficially) taken as being 1,000 ft (300 m) high or more.

The chain-like arrangement of hills in a chain is a consequence of their collective formation by mountain building forces or ice age earth movements. Hill chains generally have a uniform geological age, but may comprise several types of rock or sediment.

Hill chains normally form a watershed. They are crossed by roads that often use a natural saddle in the terrain.

== Examples ==
- the Argonne hill chain, in France.
- the Fläming south of Berlin in Germany.
- the Malvern Hills in central England.
- the ridge between the Taunus and Vogelsberg, which lies south of Giessen and forms the watershed between the Lahn valley and the Wetterau in Germany.

== See also ==
- Mountain chain

== Literature ==
- Stebbing, W.P.D. (1940). "Some early references to geology from the sixteenth century onwards". Proceedings of the Geologists' Association. 51 (2): 49–63.
- Bünz, Enno (2008). Ostsiedlung und Landesausbau in Sachsen. Leipzig: Leipziger Universitätsverlag.
- Leggiere, Michael V. (2007). The Fall of Napoleon. Vol. 1. Cambridge University Press.
