= Port Williams, Nova Scotia =

Port Williams
- Village

- Seal
- Nicknames: The Port, P-Dubs
- Motto: A Progressive Community
- Location of Port Williams in Nova Scotia
- Coordinates: 45°05′52″N 64°24′34″W
- Country: Canada
- Province: Nova Scotia
- County: Kings County
- Founded: 1760
- Incorporated: 1951

Government
  - Chair: Lewis Benedict
  - Governing Body: Port Williams Village Commission

Area
  - Total: 2.93 km^{2} (1.13 sq mi)
- Highest elevation: 14 m (46 ft)
- Lowest elevation: 0 m (0 ft)

Population (2021)
  - Total: 1,110
  - Density: 379/km^{2} (981/sq mi)
- Time zone: UTC-4 (AST)
  - Summer (DST): UTC-3 (ADT)
- Postal code: B0P 1T0
- Area code: 902
- Telephone Exchange: 542
- Website: portwilliams.com

Port Williams is a Canadian village in Kings County, Nova Scotia. It is located on the north bank of the Cornwallis River, named after Edward Cornwallis, first governor of Nova Scotia. As of 2021, the population was 1,110.

== History ==
The village was once part of the Acadian settlement of Rivière-aux-Canards who created dykes along the river beginning in the late 1600s. These dykes protect valuable farm land that is used by the local agriculture industry every year, and is considered very productive farm land.

=== 18th Century ===
After the Expulsion of the Acadians in 1755, the area around Port Williams was settled by the New England Planters in 1760 as part of Cornwallis Township. The Terry and Lockwood families took up land at the site of Port Williams and the location became known as Terry's Creek. A small wooden bridge was built at Port Williams in 1780, followed by more permanent bridge in the 1830s which attracted more settlement.

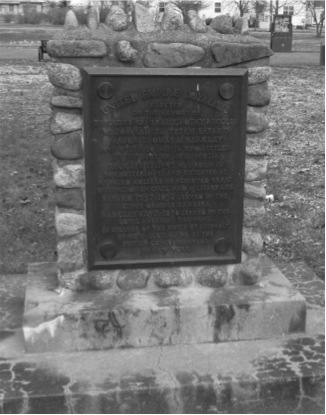
Monument to Samuel Bayard of the King's Orange Rangers, Middleton Park, Middleton, Nova Scotia, Canada

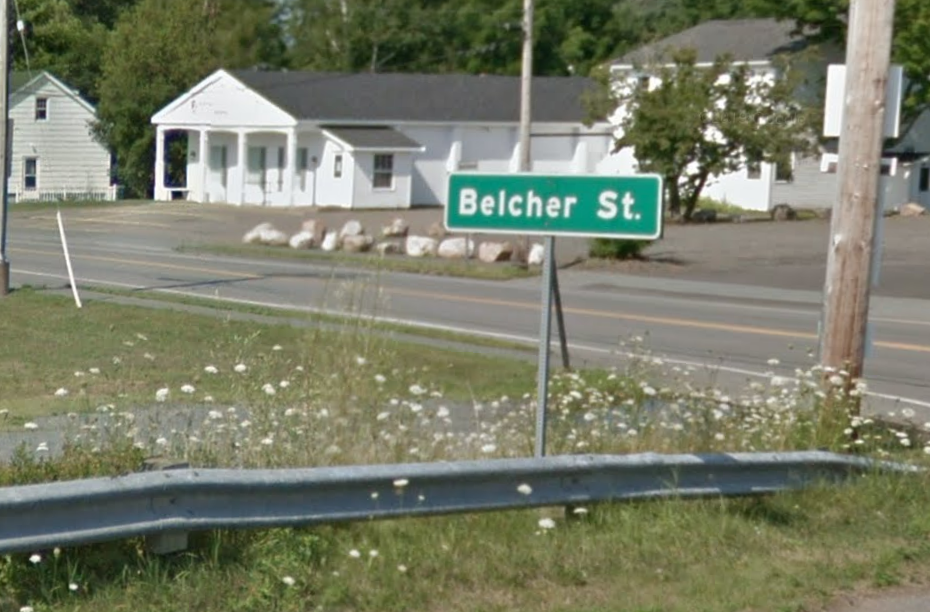
Hero of Battle of Blomindon, Lieutenant Benjamin Belcher is the namesake of Belcher St., Port Williams, Nova Scotia

During the American Revolution the local fortification Fort Hughes (Nova Scotia) was decommissioned in 1780. In the spring of 1781, Samuel Bayard (promoted to major on February 9, 1781) was ordered to take a detachment of King's Orange Rangers overland from Halifax to Cornwallis (near present-day Port Williams) to overawe local Planters who were planning to erect a Liberty Pole and thereby break with the King. There they fixed bayonets and "with bright weapons glittering, colours flying and drums beating, they marched up Church Street and back to Town Plot, where the barracks stood." This show of force brought the locals back in line. Months after the arrival of the King's Orange Rangers, American privateers were captured by the local militia in the Battle of Blomindon.

Bayard took an interest in the Annapolis Valley, and after the war he took up a grant of 4,730 acres (1,910 ha) at Wilmot Mountain.

The reputation of the Regiment grew in these later years. A few months before disbandment, Brigadier-General Henry Edward Fox expressed:

... the great satisfaction he has received in seeing the two provincial battalions of Royal N.S. Volunteers and the King's Orange Rangers, and highly approves of their discipline and military appearance ...

The King's Orange Rangers were disbanded in the autumn of 1783.

=== 19th Century ===
Port Williams became an important regional shipping point for lumber and agriculture. In the days of sailing vessels, the river was used extensively to bring ships into the port to transport apples, lumber and potatoes, to be shipped to the world market, especially Great Britain. The village was renamed in honour of Sir William Fenwick Williams, who fought in the Siege of Kars (which is the namesake of Kars Street, Port Williams). Sir Williams became the first post Canadian Confederation Lieutenant Governor of Nova Scotia. The railway arrived in 1869 with the construction of the Windsor and Annapolis Railway, later to become the Dominion Atlantic Railway. A station was built for Port Williams across the river in Greenwich. In 1884, Hantsport apple exporter W. H. Chase built the first apple warehouse in Nova Scotia beside the station, quickly followed by many others in the 1890s paving the way for a rapid growth in the apple industry in Nova Scotia.

=== 20th Century ===
Port Williams became a focus of the apple industry with a larger barrel making factory and a processing plant for apple exporter W.H. Chase. The wharves were rebuilt so serve large steamships in 1930 and continued in use until the 1970s. Although the apple industry declined after World War Two, several apple processing plants remained in Port Williams.

Pulpwood was actively shipped from the port in 1950-1971, from the field behind the Port Williams Elementary School. The hull of the ships were fully exposed when sitting on the flat cribwork of the dock.

Poultry, bulk feed and fuel feed plants were built around the railway until it ceased service to Port Williams in 2006. In 1972 the government gave $100,000 to renovate the wharf. Three years later the widest ship to dock at Port Williams brought a load of soybean meal to the port from Chicago.

The old wharf has restaurant / pubs and in nearby Starrs Point there is a Cheese Farm.

== Demographics ==
In the 2021 Census of Population conducted by Statistics Canada, Port Williams had a population of 1,110 living in 473 of its 492 total private dwellings, a change of −6.4% from its 2016 population of 1,186. With a land area of 2.93 km^{2} (1.13 sq mi), it had a population density of 378.8/km^{2} (981.2/sq mi) in 2021.

== Education ==
The village is home to Port Williams Elementary School, located on Belcher Street. The current school was built in 1966 to replace the previous one that burned down, and includes a gymnasium, modern music room and many class rooms.

== Gallery ==
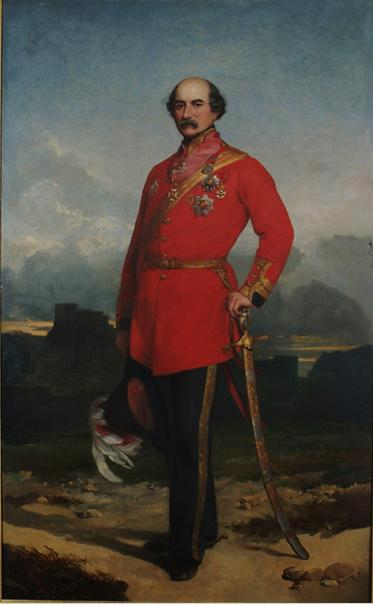
Sir William Williams, Province House (Nova Scotia)

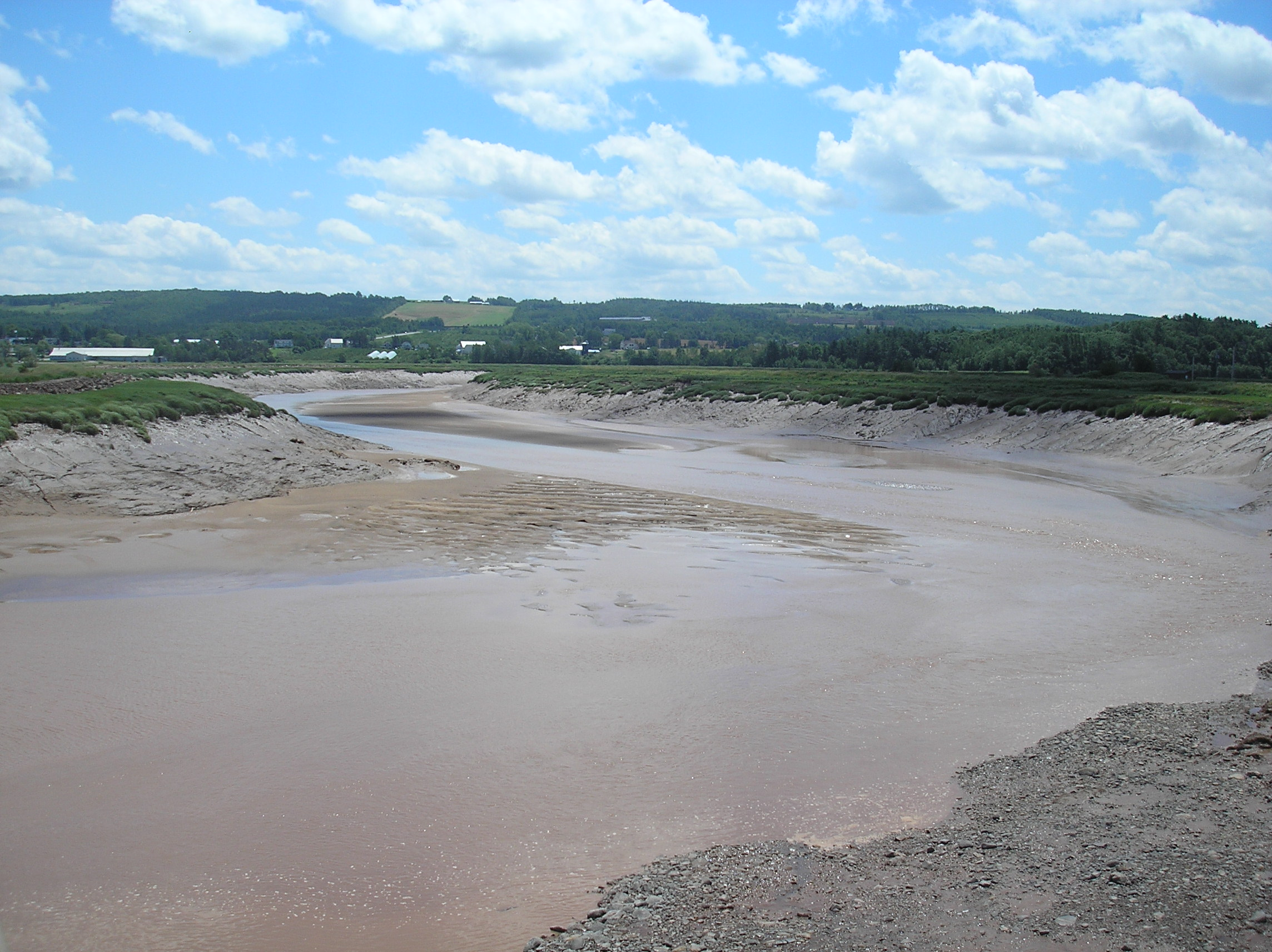
Cornwallis River near low tide

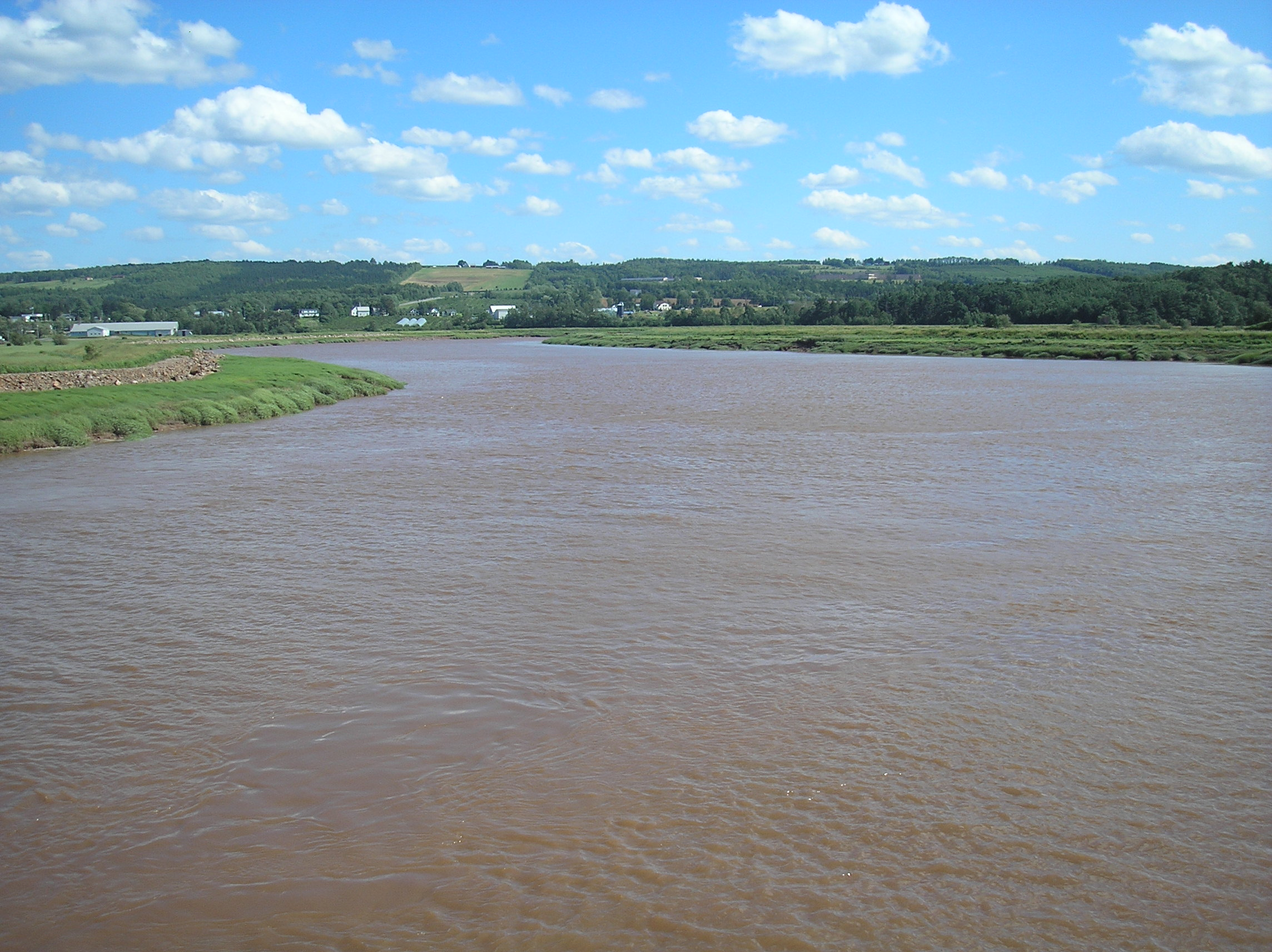
Cornwallis river near high tide

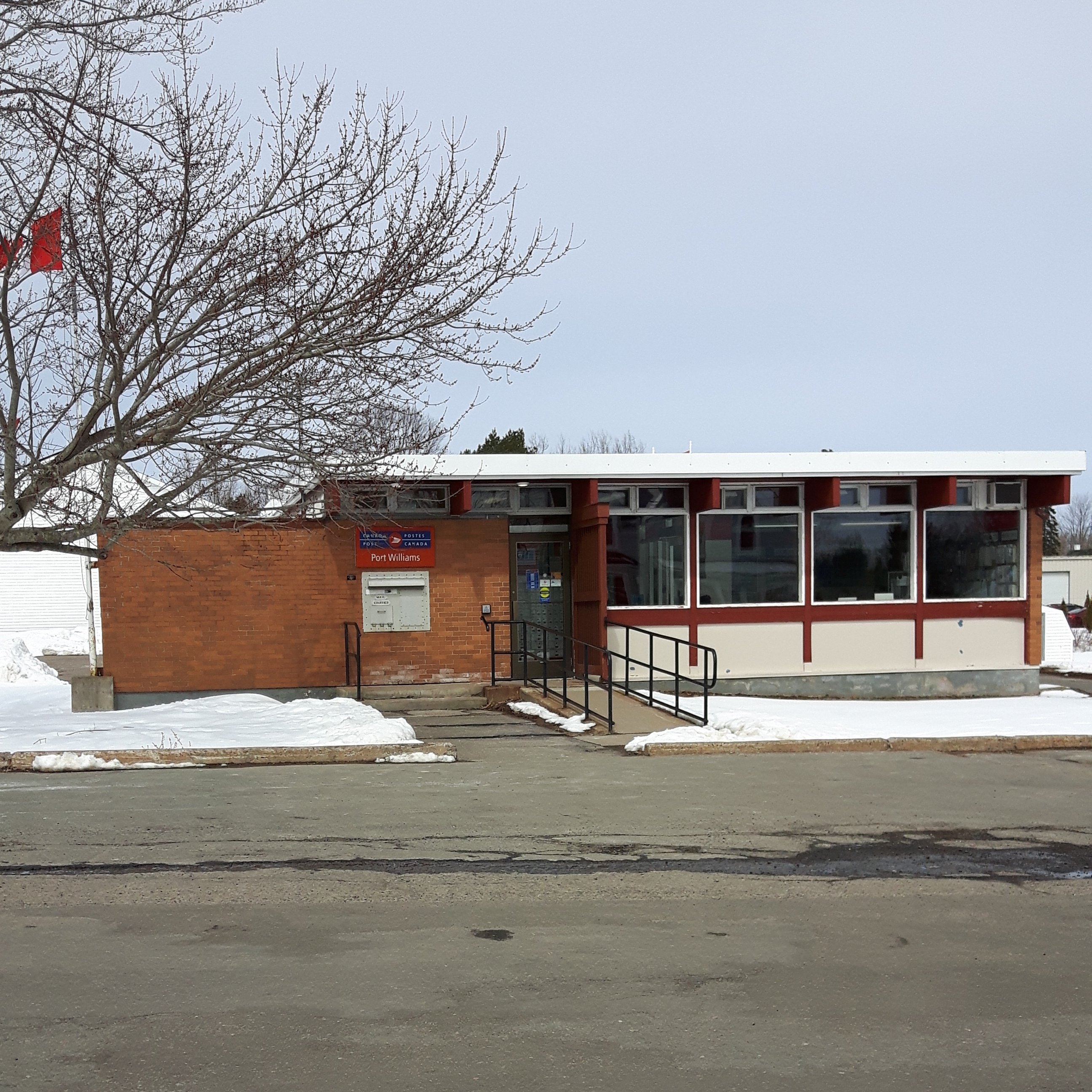
Post Office, Port Williams

== Notable residents ==
- Benjamin Belcher
- Samuel Bayard of the King's Orange Rangers
- Jacob Shaffelburg - professional footballer for Nashville SC
- Drake Batherson - professional hockey player for the Ottawa Senators
