= Belcher Mountains =

Former prehistoric mountain range

Coordinates: 56.4134°N 79.1676°W

The Belcher Mountains are a former mountain range that stood in the Hudson Bay region of Canada in the late Precambrian. The mountains have since been uplifted and folded erosion has beveled them into a nearly flat plain.

== Description ==
Exposed plunging folded sedimentary and volcanic strata in Canada's Hudson Bay region outline the former position of the Belcher Mountains that stood in the late Precambrian. The folds trend northward. In the millions of years since, the mountains were uplifted and folded erosion has beveled them into a nearly flat plain. The lines running across the units are fractures and faults caused by the deformation of the units.
