= Transverse valley =

Low-lying area deeply interrupting a mountain chain

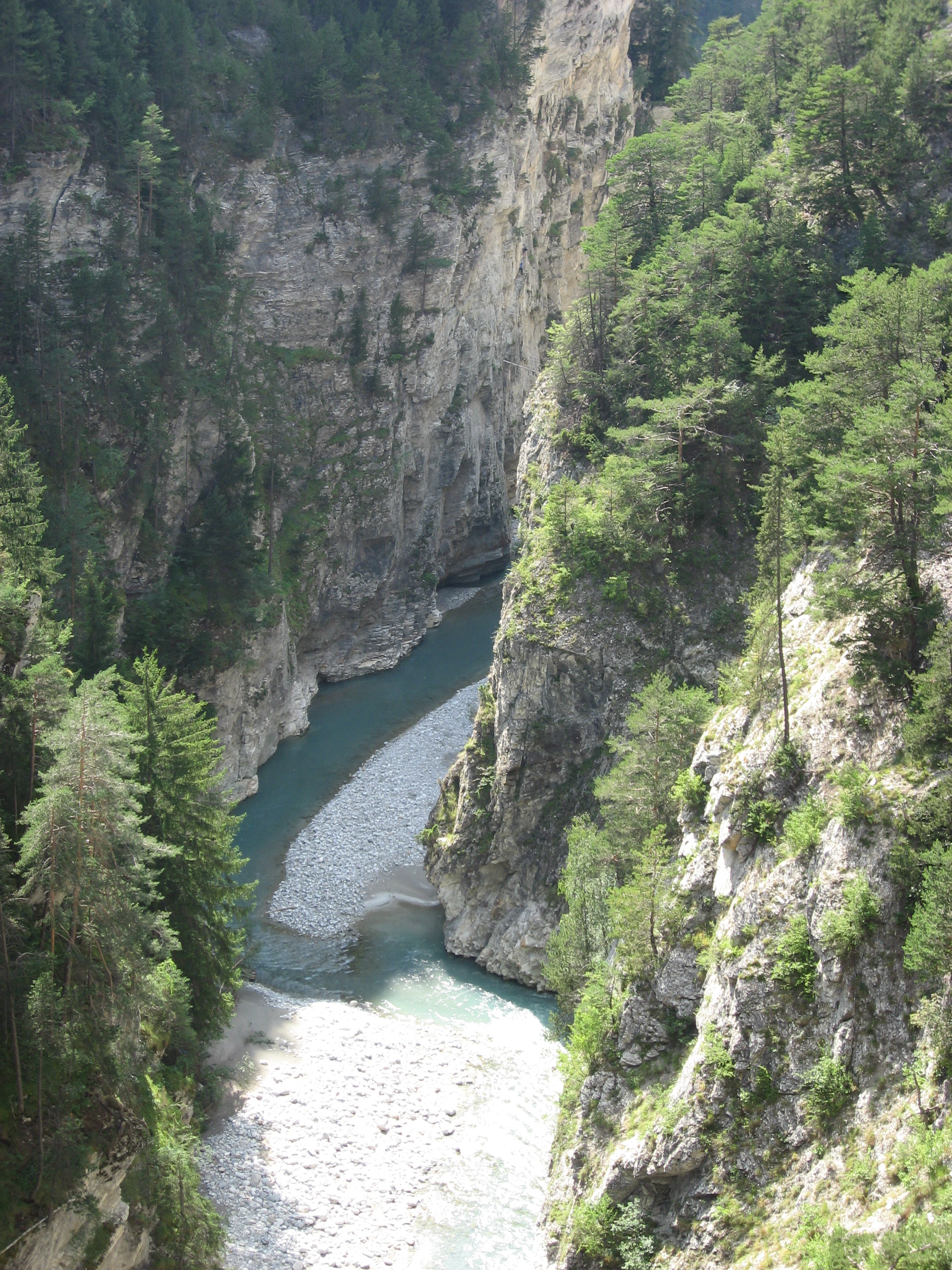
The River Arc, near Aussois, which runs through one of the largest transverse valleys of the Western Alps

A transverse valley is a valley which cuts at right angles across a ridge or, in mountainous terrain a valley that generally runs at right angles to the line of the main mountain chain or crest. Its geomorphological counterpart is the longitudinal valley.

During the course of a long valley, both forms may alternate.

Geologically transverse valleys frequently form a water gap where, during the course of earth history, the erosion of a river or large stream cuts a path through a mountain or hill range that stands tectonically at right angles to it.

The Val de Travers in the Jura Mountains is a longitudinal valley, despite its name.

== See also ==
- Transverse Valleys (Chile)
