= Benjamin Belcher =

Nova Scotian politician

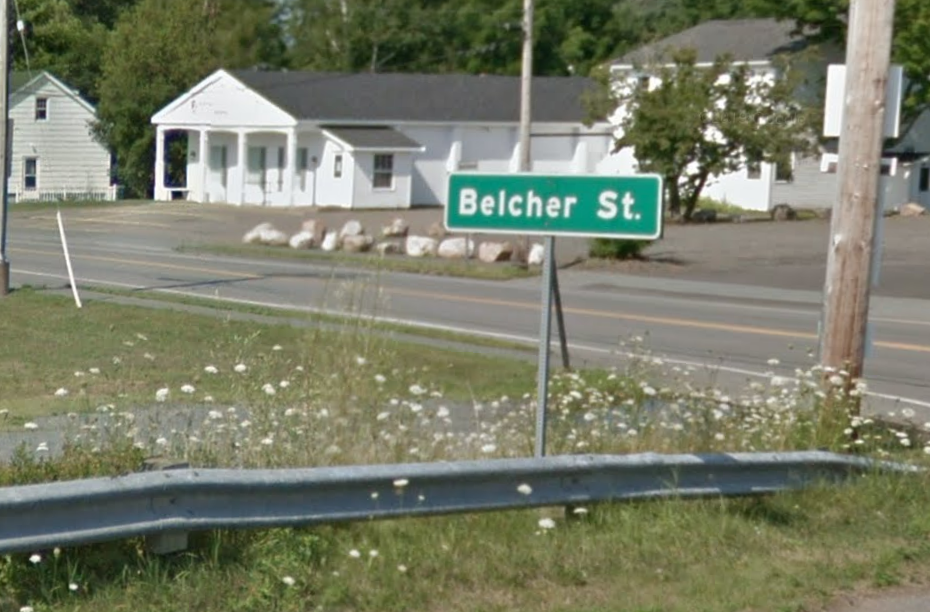
Lieutenant Belcher is the namesake of Belcher St., Port Williams, Nova Scotia

Benjamin Belcher (July 17, 1743 – May 14, 1802) was a merchant, militia leader, and political figure in Nova Scotia. He was victorious in the Battle off Cape Split during the American Revolution. He represented Cornwallis Township from 1785 to 1793 and King's County from 1793 to 1799 in the Nova Scotia House of Assembly.

He was born in Gibraltar and came to Nova Scotia around 1760, settling at Cornwallis years later. In 1764, he married Sarah Post. Belcher operated a general store and was involved in the trade with the West Indies bringing eggnog to the continent of North America.

He was a lieutenant in the local militia. During the American Revolution, he was in command of the Success and on 21 May 1781, he made a daring attack on American Privateers, killing one crew member and capturing 30 others.

Belcher died with Cornwallis at the age of 58. In his will he indicated that he had slaves.

His grandson Clement Horton Belcher was a publisher and book seller in Halifax, Nova Scotia.

== Legacy ==
- namesake of Belcher St., Port Williams, Nova Scotia

== See also ==
- Military history of Nova Scotia
