= Mountain chain =

Row of high mountain summits

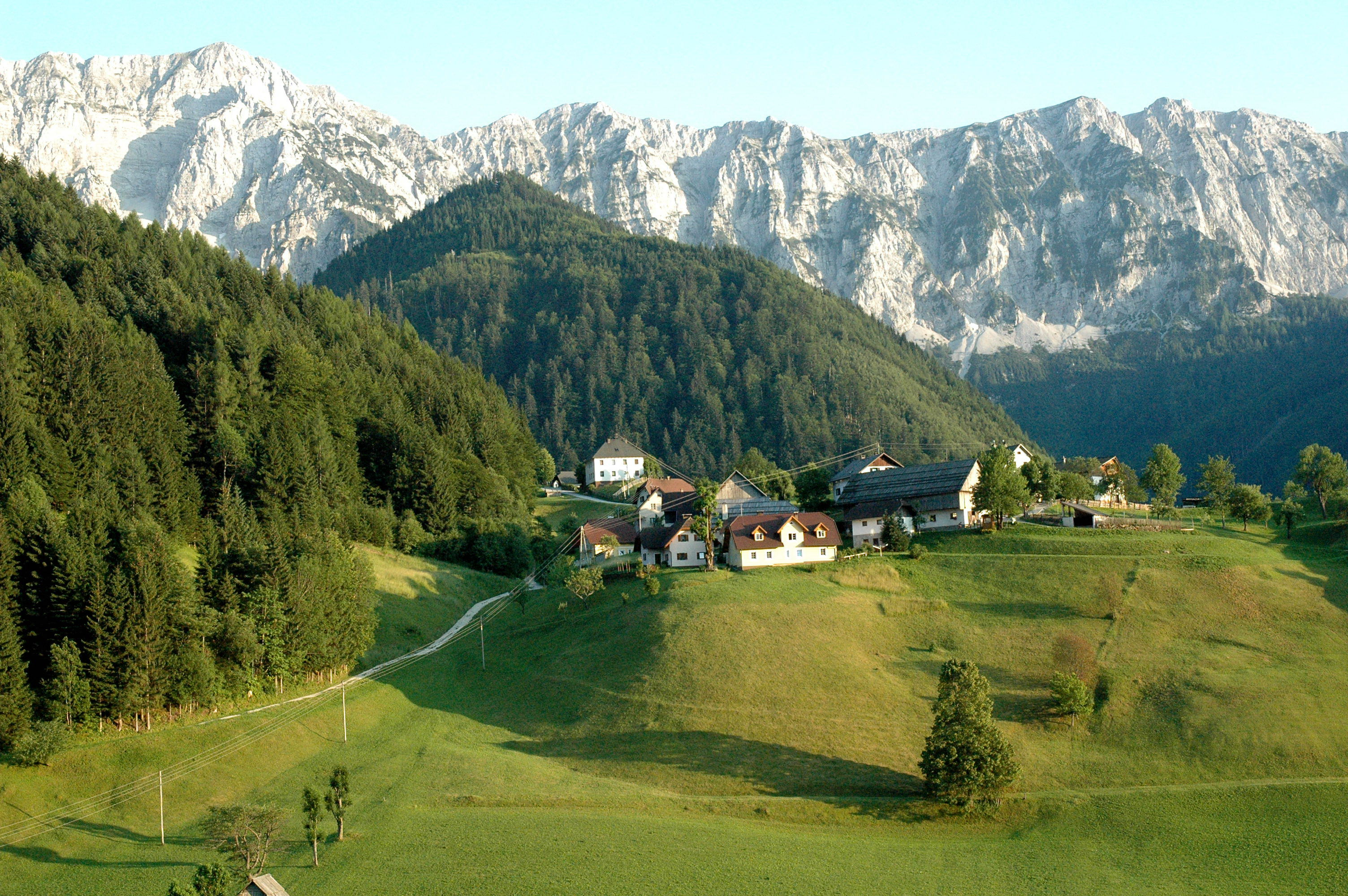
The Karawanks, a single, long mountain chain. This is the Koschuta ridge near Zell, Carinthia

A mountain chain is a row of high mountain summits, a linear sequence of interconnected or related mountains, or a contiguous ridge of mountains within a larger mountain range. The term is also used for elongated fold mountains with several parallel chains ("chain mountains").

While in mountain ranges, the term mountain chain is common, in hill ranges a sequence of hills tends to be referred to a ridge or hill chain.

Elongated mountain chains occur most frequently in the orogeny of fold mountains, (that are folded by lateral pressure), and nappe belts (where a sheetlike body of rock has been pushed over another rock mass). Other types of range such as horst ranges, fault block mountain or truncated uplands rarely form parallel mountain chains. However, if a truncated upland is eroded into a high table land, the incision of valleys can lead to the formation of mountain or hill chains.

== Formation of parallel mountain chains ==
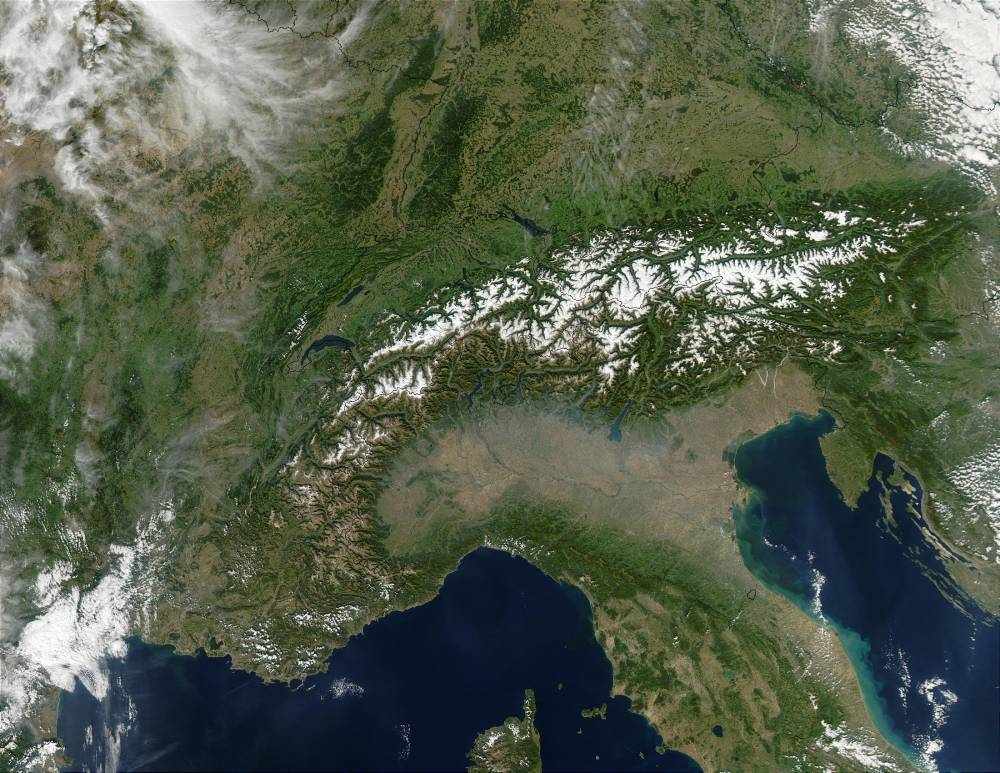
In this satellite image of the Alps, the snow limit picks out the individual mountain chains

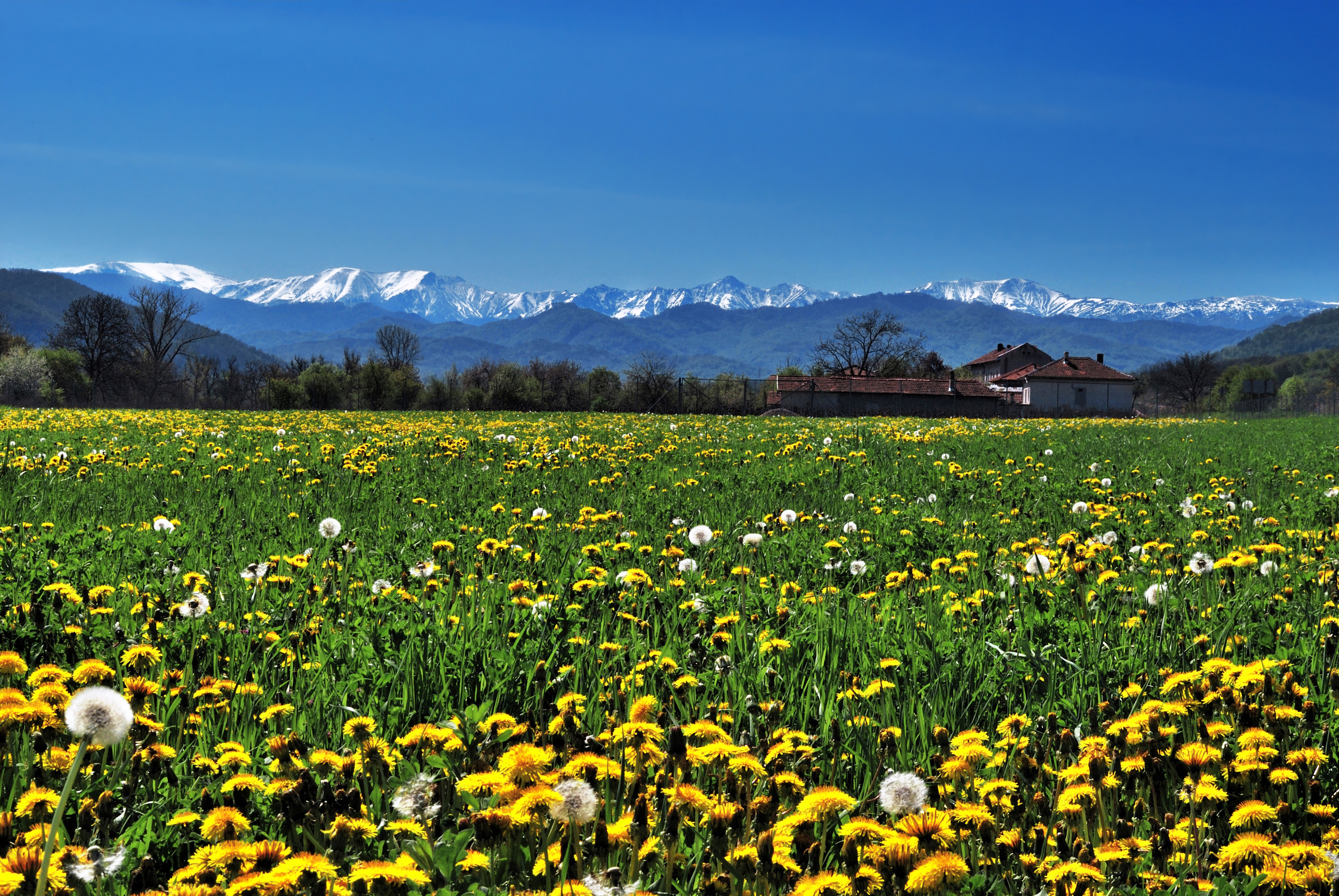
A view of the Balkan Mountains chain

The chain-like arrangement of summits and the formation of long, jagged mountain crests – known in Spanish as sierras ("saws") – is a consequence of their collective formation by mountain building forces. The often linear structure is linked to the direction of these thrust forces and the resulting mountain folding which in turn relates to the fault lines in the upper part of the Earth's crust, that run between the individual mountain chains. In these fault zones, the rock, which has sometimes been pulverised, is easily eroded, so that large river valleys are carved out. These, so called longitudinal valleys reinforce the trend, during the early mountain building phase, towards the formation of parallel chains of mountains.

The tendency, especially of fold mountains (e. g. the Cordilleras) to produce roughly parallel chains is due to their rock structure and the propulsive forces of plate tectonics. The uplifted rock masses are either magmatic plutonic rocks, easily shaped because of their higher temperature, or sediments or metamorphic rocks, which have a less robust structure, that are deposited in the synclines. As a result of orogenic movements, strata of folded rock are formed that are crumpled out of their original horizontal plane and thrust against one another. The longitudinal stretching of the folds takes place at right angles to the direction of the lateral thrusting. The overthrust folds of a nappe belt (e.g. the Central Alps) are formed in a similar way.

Although the fold mountains, chain mountains and nappe belts around the world were formed at different times in the Earth's history, all during their initial mountain building phases, they are nevertheless morphologically similar. Harder rock forms continuous arêtes or ridges that follow the strike of the beds and folds. The mountain chains or ridges therefore run approximately parallel to one another. They are only interrupted by short, usually narrow, transverse valleys, which often form water gaps. During the course of Earth history, erosion by water, ice and wind carried away the highest points of the mountain crests and carved out individual summits or summit chains. Between them, notches were formed that, depending on altitude and rock-type, form knife-edged cols or gentler mountain passes and saddles.

== Dominant rocks and mountain forms ==
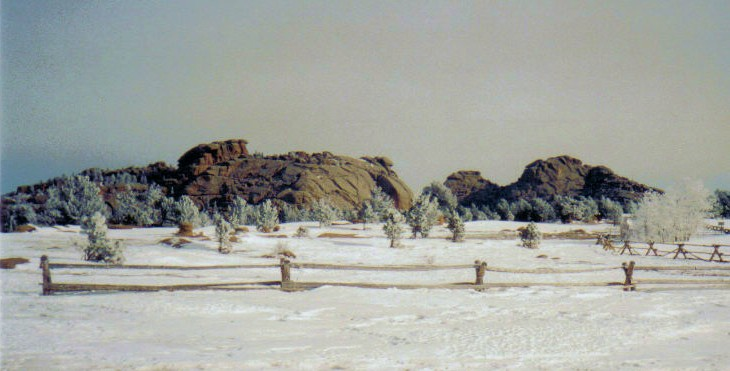
The remains of an old mountain chain in the Laramie Mountains, Colorado

Nappe or fold mountains, with their roughly parallel mountain chains, generally have a common geological age, but may consist of various types of rock. For example, in the Central Alps, granitic rocks, gneisses and metamorphic slate are found, while to the north and south, are the Limestone Alps. The Northern Limestone Alps are, in turn, followed by soft flysch mountains and the molasse zone.

The type of rock influences the appearance of the mountain ranges very markedly, because erosion leads to very different topography depending on the hardness of the rock and its petrological structure. In addition to height and climate, other factors are the layering of the rock, its gradient and aspect, the types of waterbody and the lines of dislocation. For hard rock massifs, rugged rock faces (e.g. in the Dolomites) and mighty scree slopes are typical. By contrast, flysch or slate forms gentler mountain shapes and kuppen or domed mountaintops, because the rock is not porous, but easily shaped.

== See also ==
- Orogeny
- Tectonics
- List of highest mountains on Earth
- List of mountain ranges

== Literature ==
- Wissen heute: Geologie. Kaiser-Verlag, Florence/Klagenfurt, 1995
- Der geologische Aufbau Österreichs. Geologische Bundesanstalt, Springer-Verlag Vienna/ New York
- PanGeo, Erdwissenschaften in Österreich. Conference proceedings, 200 pp., Sessions on the Neogene, TRANSALP I and II. Univ. Salzburg, 2005
- Fischer-Lexikon Geographie, pp. 101–129, Frankfurt, 1959
- Großer Weltatlas, Enzyklopädischer Teil (mountain building, folds and faults, the rock cycle). Publ. ÖAMTC, Vienna, ~1980
- André Cailleux: Der unbekannte Planet: Anatomie der Erde. Kindlers Universitätsbibliothek, Munich, 1968, Chapters 1 and 3
- Gebirge, in: Lueger, Otto: Lexikon der gesamten Technik und ihrer Hilfswissenschaften, Vol. 4 Stuttgart, Leipzig, 1906, pp. 316-317.
