= Longitudinal valley =

Low-lying area between two parallel mountain chains

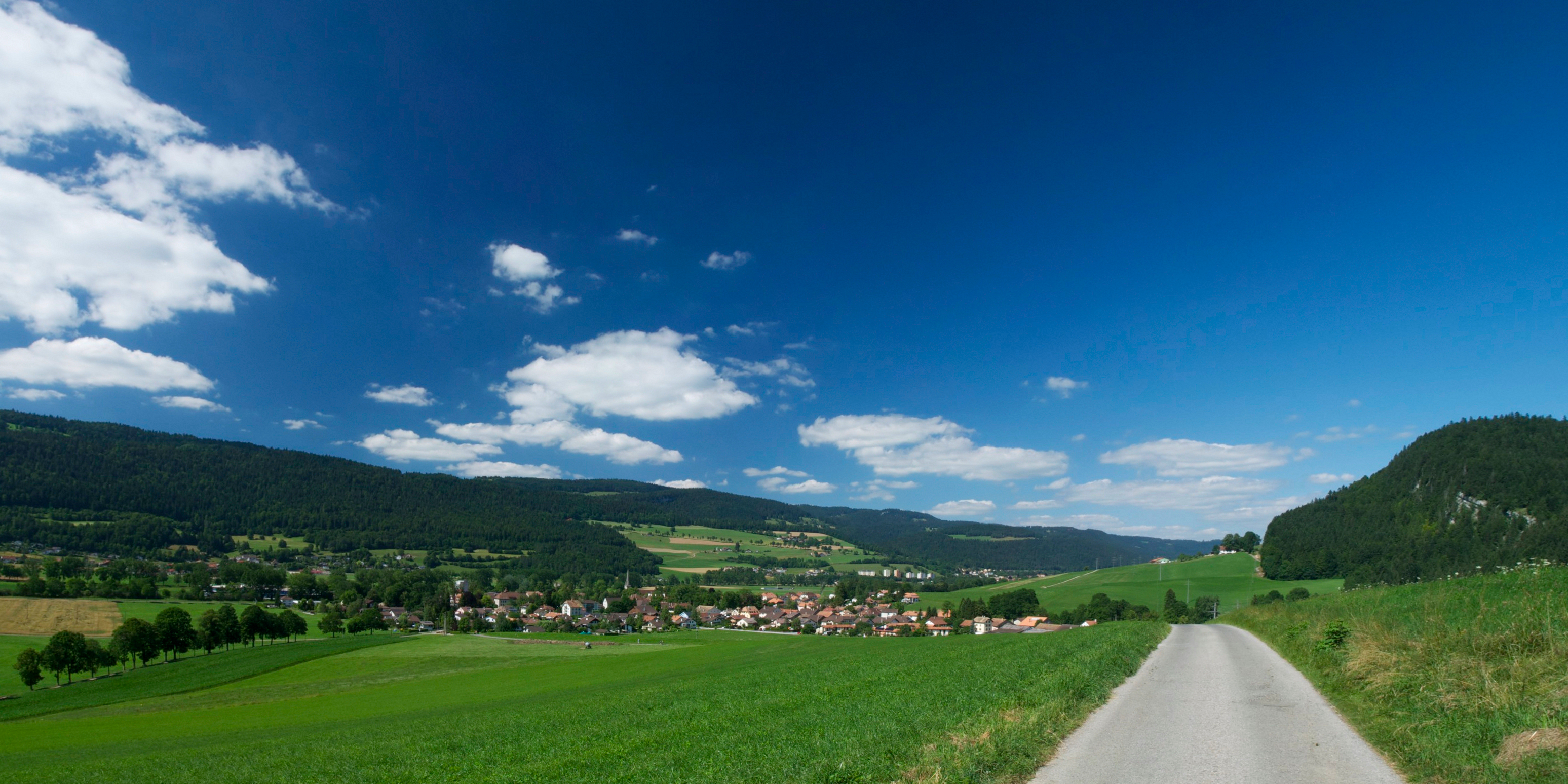
The Val de Travers which, despite its name, is a longitudinal valley

A longitudinal valley is an elongated valley found between two almost-parallel mountain chains in geologically young fold mountains, such as the Alps, Carpathians, Andes, or the highlands of Central Asia. They are often occupied and shaped by a subsequent stream. The term is frequently used if a mountain range also has prominent transverse valleys, where rivers cut through the mountain chains in so-called water gaps.

== Description ==
Many longitudinal valleys follow the strike of the rock strata or significant geological fault lines. These are formed in conjunction with the tectonic movements during mountain building, which in turn are due to plate tectonic processes. The faults are structures that reach deep into the lower part of the Earth's crust, which is already in place before the actual mountain building phase and is later reactivated. The Periadriatic Seam in the Alps is a good example of this. In the formation of longitudinal valleys, however, nappe overthrusts also play a major, if not the most important, role. The nappes that are present in many young fold mountain ranges are responsible to a large extent for the morphological division of a mountain belt into parallel chains. In such cases, longitudinal valleys generally run along the so-called leading edge of the nappe (the overthrust front) and are oriented at right angles to the direction of movement of the tectonic nappes, which in turn correspond to the direction of movement of the colliding continental blocks.

This configuration results in a course that runs with the strike of the geological units. This is an important criterion for the definition of a longitudinal valley. In contrast, a transverse valley cuts across the strike.

Particularly long valley systems that are occupied by several rivers, sometimes running in opposite directions, are known in German as Längstalfurchen ("longitudinal troughs"), as opposed to the usual Längstäler, although no such distinction is made in English. The Eastern Alps and other Alpine ranges have many such troughs, which are almost straight for a distance of several hundred miles and were accentuated by glacial processes during the Pleistocene.

== Examples ==
- the Inn-Salzach-Enns Valley of the Alps, through which flow the Inn, Salzach and Enns rivers (Austria)
- the Mur-Mürz Valley in the Eastern Alps – further south (Austria)
- the Drava-Gailtal lineament in the Eastern Alps (Austria, small portion in Slovenia)
- the Santa Clara Valley of the San Francisco Bay Area in California, lying between the San Andreas Fault and the Hayward Fault Zone
- the 200 to 300-kilometre-long longitudinal valley of the Pontic Mountains (Turkey)
- the longitudinal valleys (also known as Duns) of the upper courses of the Indus and Brahmaputra between the Himalayas (Nepal, China) like Dehradun, Patli Dun, Kotli Dun etc. They lie between Himachal and Shiwalik ranges of Himalayas.
- The line of the Upper Rhone and Anterior Rhine valleys – albeit separated by the Furka and Oberalp Passes – can also be seen as a longitudinal trough.
