= Charles Belcher =

Charles Belcher may refer to:

- Charles Frederic Belcher (1876–1970), Australian lawyer, author, British colonial jurist and amateur ornithologist
- Charles Belcher (actor) (1872–1943), American film actor
- Charles Belcher (cricketer) (1872–1938), English cricketer
- Charles Belcher (runner), winner of the 600 yards at the 1940 USA Indoor Track and Field Championships
