= Battle of Blomindon =

1781 battle

Battle of Blomidon
- Part of the American Revolutionary War
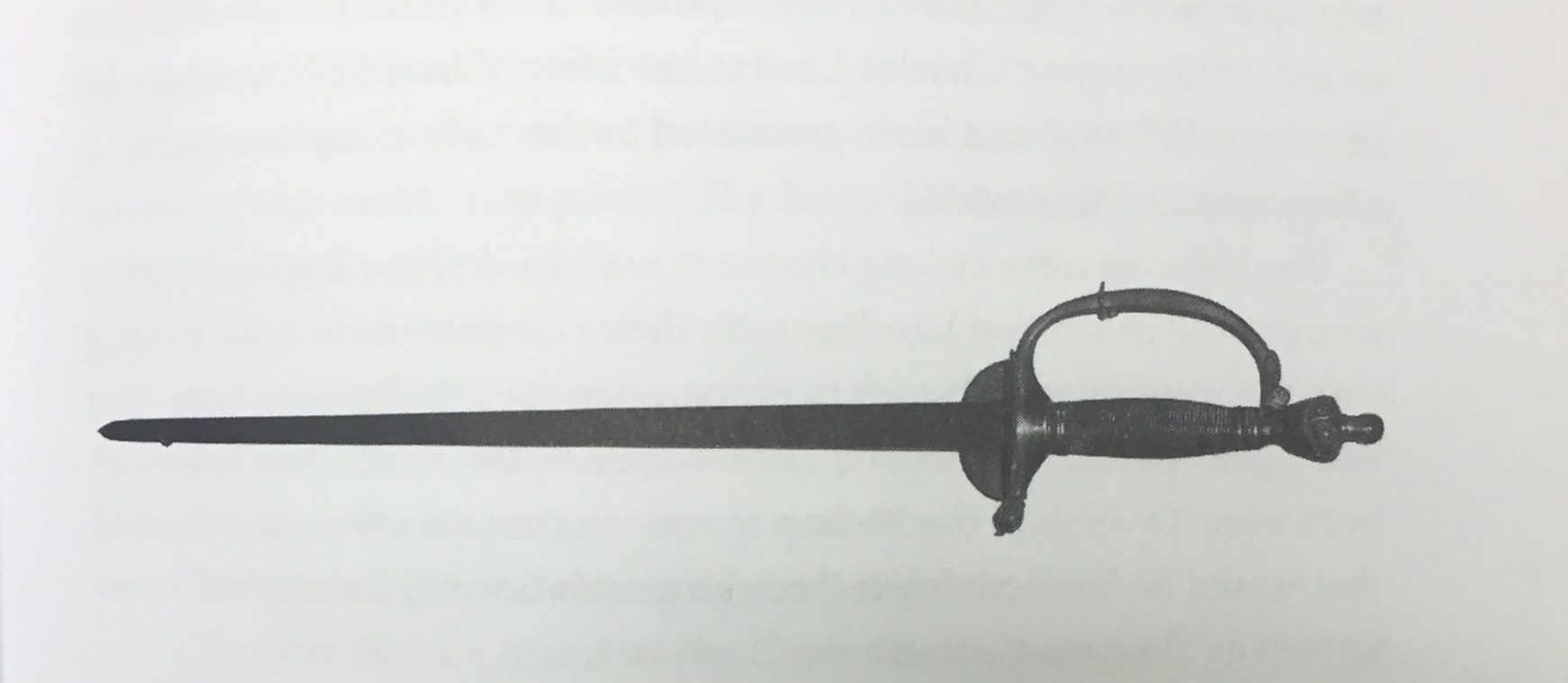
- Captain William Bishop's Sword from Battle; Kings County Museum, Nova Scotia
Date	21 May 1781
Location	off Wolfville, Nova Scotia
Result	British victory

Belligerents
United States	Great Britain

Commanders and leaders
	(Kingdom of Great Britain) William Bishop (Note: Member of the 3rd Connecticut Regiment during French and Indian War.) (Kingdom of Great Britain) Amos Sheffield (Kingdom of Great Britain) Benjamin Belcher (Kingdom of Great Britain) Jonathan Crane

Strength
28 privateers	1 schooner (35 men); Success (28 men)

Casualties and losses
1 killed	No casualties

The Battle of Blomidon took place on 21 May 1781 during the American Revolutionary War. The naval battle involved three armed U.S. privateer vessels against three Nova Scotian vessels off Cape Split, Nova Scotia. American Privateers caught two Nova Scotia Vessels. The first Nova Scotia vessel was re-captured by Lieut Benjamin Belcher. The second Nova Scotia vessel was overtaken by the captured crew under the command of Captain Bishop. The privateers were taken to Cornwallis and put on trial.

== Background ==
During the American Revolutionary War, the U.S. regularly attacked Nova Scotia by land and sea. U.S. privateers devastated the maritime economy by raiding many of the coastal communities, such as the numerous raids on Liverpool and on Annapolis Royal. After the British defeated the Penobscot Expedition, the U.S. privateers began their most fierce revenge by attacking Nova Scotia.

The engagement between the U.S. privateers and local militia was one of several in the region. On 2 May 1777, in the Minas Basin the Captain Collet ordered the capture the U.S. privateer schooner Sea Duck, under the command of John Bohannan. He had the vessel taken to Windsor. There was another raid on the Cornwallis Township in 1778. In June 1779, the British forces at Windsor captured 12 U.S. privateers in the Bay of Fundy.

On 10 July 1780, the British privateer brig Resolution (16 guns) under the command of Thomas Ross engaged the U.S. privateer Viper (22 guns and 130 men) off Halifax at Sambro Light. In what one observer described as "one of the bloodiest battles in the history of privateering", the two privateers began a "severe engagement" during which both pounded each other with cannon fire for about 90 minutes. The engagement resulted in the surrender of Resolution and the death of up to 18 British and 33 U.S. sailors.

== Battle ==
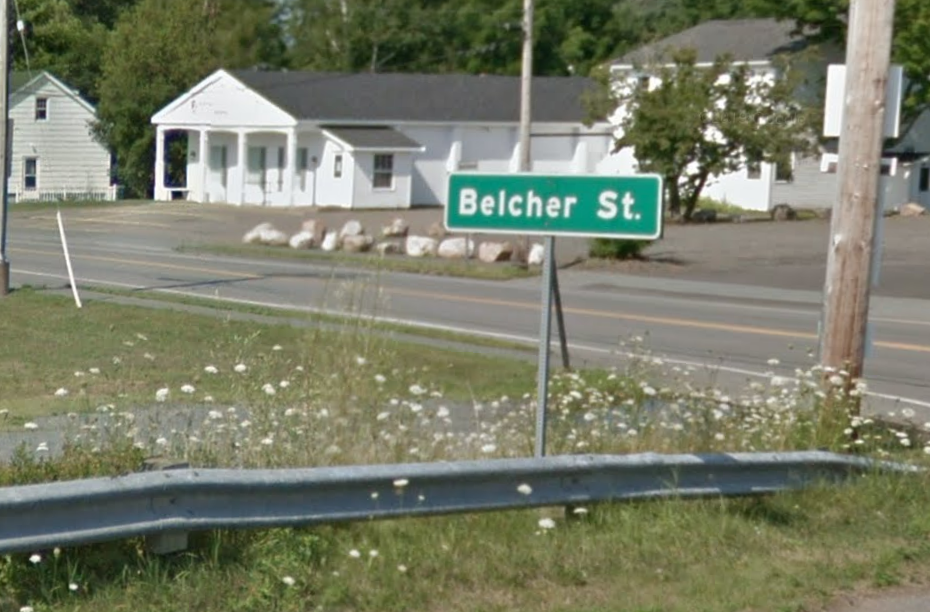
Lieutenant Benjamin Belcher is the namesake of Belcher St., Port Williams, Nova Scotia

There were 30 U.S. privateers in one armed shallop (one carriage gun and six swivels) and two whaleboats. They captured Captain Sheffield’s schooner.

Captain William Bishop, in a small schooner (35 men), pursued the three privateer vessels and their prize. Bishop was in a 25 minute naval battle with the privateers but was captured by them.

Lieutenant Belcher in the armed sloop Success (with 28 crewmen) pursued the three U.S. privateer vessels and their two prizes (Sheffield’s schooner and Bishop’s schooner). Belcher caught Sheffield’s vessel, killing one privateer in the process. Many of the privateers then escaped in their whaleboat to the shores of Cape Split.

Belcher then began to pursue Captain Bishop’s vessel. During the pursuit Captain Bishop overthrew his captors and regained command of his schooner. He sent the remaining U.S. privateer prisoners to Cornwallis.

== Afterward ==
U.S. privateers continued to attack vessels in the Bay of Fundy. On August 7, 1781 the British schooner Adventure captured the schooner Mary off Annapolis. In the fall of 1781, under orders of Captain James Nevins (Nevens, Nivens, Nuyens, Nevers), Mr. Low of the U.S. naval vessel Defence (18 men) went up the Bay of Fundy and was attacked by the Nova Scotia militia. The militia captured two of the Americans, while the rest of the crew fled into the woods and were rescued by Acadians.

== Legacy ==
- The sword used by Captain William Bishop in the battle is in the King's County Museum, Nova Scotia
- Lieut. Belcher is the namesake of Belcher St., Port Williams
- Poem entitled The Battle of Blomidon May 21, 1781 by Ms. Belle Belcher Robinson, Wolfville Historical Society

The cannon were seven that spoke from their sloop;
And hands that were greedy clutched gladly upon
A ship Amos Sheffield had filled for Saint John.
Their sally was smashed in ten minutes or sooner;
Yanks captured Will Bishop and Jonathan Crane
And all of their party who struggled in vain.
Thus loaded with loot and captives galore,
Three vessels set out from Cornwallis shore,

Then Benjamin Belcher, once born at Gibraltar,
Was fit to be tied in an over-sized halter;
He learned where a vessel with guns might be got,
And rode like a madman to Horton Town Plot.
We were twenty-eight strong in the schooner SUCCESS,
Militiamen bold who with Belcher did press
By horse out to Horton and clambered on board,
And sailed on the track of our foe-men abhorred.

The season was May and the orchards were white;
It seemed a grand day for a wonderful fight.
With the tide running in, they were caught at the Cape;
We hammered their sloop, and in haste to escape
Some took to their dories and scrambled to land
While others lay dead in the ship they had manned.
Still slowed by the tide was the schooner they'd taken
And this by its captors was quickly forsaken,

And promptly Will Bishop and Jonathan Crane
Discomfit their guards and a victory gain.
Thus over the Basin by noon we withdrew
With three captured ships and our jubilant crew.
"The blow that we struck at the Cape was a squelcher!"
Remarked our stout commodore, Benjamin Belcher.

== Aftermath ==
U.S. privateers remained a threat to Nova Scotian ports for the rest of the war. The following year, after a failed attempt to raid Chester, Nova Scotia, U.S. privateers struck again in the Raid on Lunenburg in 1782.

== See also ==
- American Revolution - Nova Scotia theatre
- Military history of Nova Scotia

== Bibliography ==
Secondary sources

- Joan Dawson. Captain William Bishop's sword. A History of Nova Scotia in Objects. pp 51–53
- Dr. Pitt Brechin "The Western Chronicle" of Kentville, NS, 4 Mar 1890
- Gardner W. Allen, A NAVAL HISTORY OF THE AMERICAN REVOLUTION (Boston, 1913), Chapter 17.
- Gwyn, Julian, Ashore and afloat
- Gwyn, Julian (2004), Frigates and Foremasts: The North American Squadron in Nova Scotia. Waters, 1745–1815, UBC Press.
- The history of Kings County, Nova Scotia, heart of the Acadian land.

Primary sources

- Nova Scotia Gazette of June 4, 1782
