= Truncated upland =

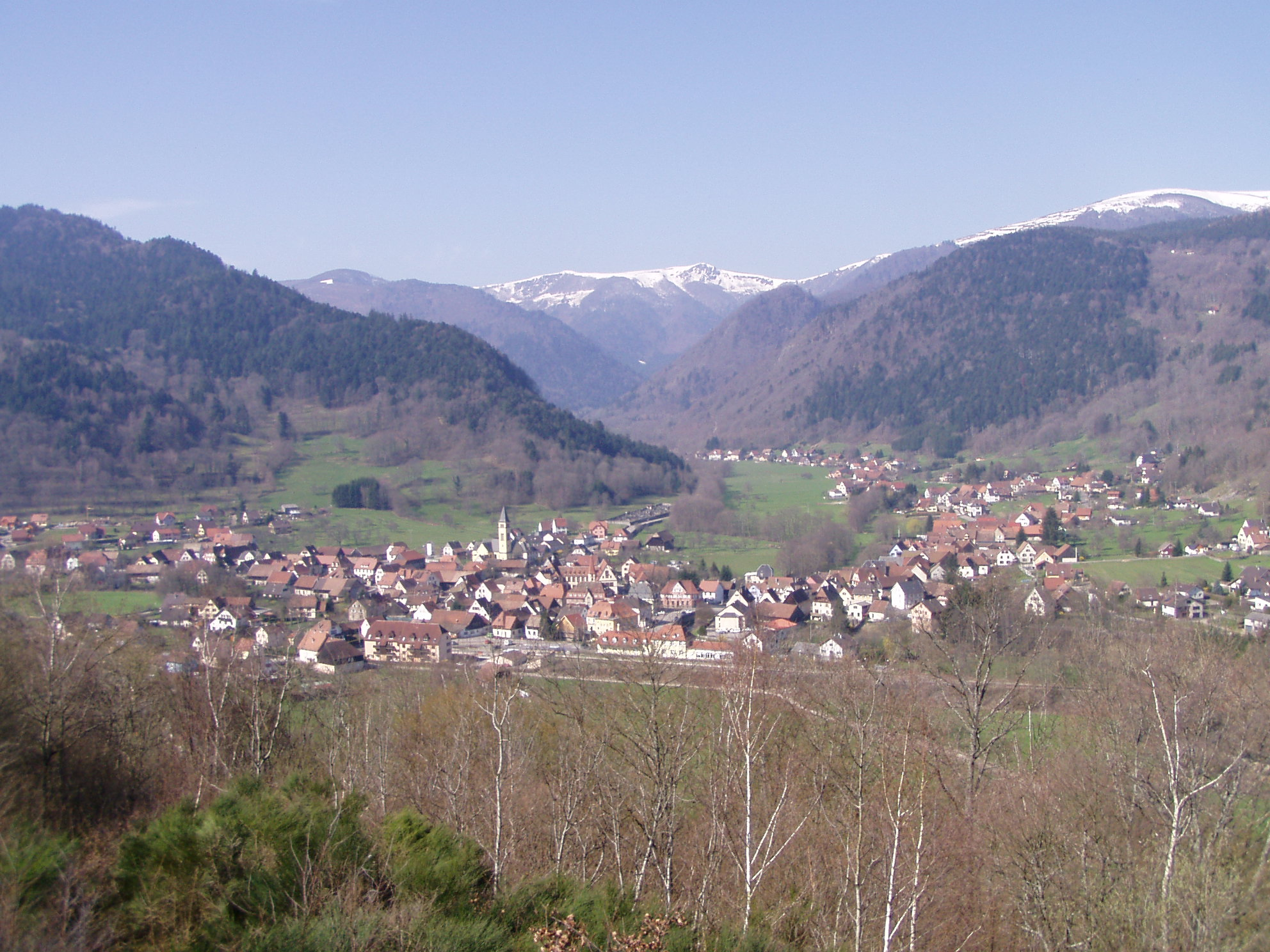
Typical landscape of the Vosges, a truncated upland in France

Truncated upland, truncated highland or bevelled upland (German: Rumpfgebirge) are the heavily eroded remains of a fold mountain range, often from an early period in earth history. The term Rumpfgebirge ("rump mountains") was first introduced into the literature in 1886 by Ferdinand von Richthofen. The rumps of the former mountain ranges may be found in many lowland regions of the Earth's crust (where they form the so-called basement rocks) and especially outcrop in Central Europe through more recent tectonics. This could result in an uplifted peneplain, which is one type of truncated upland.

The valley structures of truncated uplands are often more irregular than in the younger fold mountains, which is due to the considerably younger tectonic processes and stronger erosion of the former mountain ranges that were originally often up to several thousand metres high. By contrast, their plateaux are orographically similar in shape.

== Examples ==
In western Europe many of the Central Upland ranges fall into the category of truncated uplands – for example the Harz, the Ore Mountains, the Fichtel Mountains and the Rhenish Massif. Other ranges also date to the time of the Variscan orogeny, including those on either side of the Rhine, such as the Black Forest and Vosges and, from the Bavarian Forest in northeast Bavaria, through the Bohemian Forest in the Czech Republic to the Bohemian Massif in Austria and the Czech Republic, not to mention the French Massif Central. This mountain formation took place in the Middle Palaeozoic, during the Devonian and Carboniferous epochs about 350 to 250 million years ago. Already by the Permian the Variscan mountains had been eroded into the so-called Permian peneplain and overlain by sedimentary strata. These remains survive as Variscan "islands" between the younger sedimentary rocks of the Mesozoic. During the course of subsequent earth history, fault block tectonics followed, which characterised the present appearance of the German Central Uplands. These truncated Variscan mountains are usually strongly affected by magmatic processes.

The erosion of the mountains exposed numerous mineral resources e.g. silver and iron ore in the Harz as well as copper (the Rammelsberg is a type locality for SEDEX deposits), or uranium in the Ore Mountains.

Even older are the Caledonian Mountains of Scotland and the rest of the plateaux and coastal mountains in Scandinavia, which were formed about 500 million years ago.

In North America the almost 3,000-kilometre-long mountain chain of the Appalachians is one of the largest areas of truncated highland in the world. It extends in widths of 200 to 300 kilometres from the southern states of the United States to the east Canadian Newfoundland, but only reaches heights of just over 2,000 metres in the south. Many mineral deposits of coal, mineral oil and iron ore, as well as fertile plains make the range and its surrounding area into one of the richest regions of America.

The Urals between eastern Europe and Siberia have a similar importance in terms of mining and the economy; and the extent of these mountains in Russia, which are up to 1,900 metres high, is similar to that of the Appalachians.

== Literature ==
- Ferdinand von Richthofen (1886), "II. Rumpfgebirge oder Abrasionsgebirge", Führer für Forschungsreisende : Anleitung zu Beobachtungen über Gegenstände der physischen Geographie und Geologie (Online) (in German), Berlin: Oppenheim, pp. 669–676
