= Samuel Belcher =

Australian cricketer

Personal information
- Born: 1 November 1834; Sheffield, England
- Died: 22 August 1920 (aged 85); Garroorigang, New South Wales, Australia
- Source: ESPNcricinfo, 22 December 2016

Samuel Belcher (1 November 1834 – 22 August 1920) was an Australian cricketer. He played one first-class match for New South Wales in 1866/67.

== See also ==
- List of New South Wales representative cricketers
