= William J. Belcher =

New Zealand painter

William Belcher (1883–1949) was a New Zealand painter who spent much of the later part of his life in Fiji where he produced a collection of about 90 water-colour paintings illustrating the birdlife of the islands.

== New Zealand ==
Belcher was born in England and emigrated to New Zealand at the age of three. He grew up on a farm at Taranaki where he showed an early interest in sketching and painting. He later took some lessons in painting at an Auckland studio but was largely self-taught. He married in 1918 and worked by operating river launches in the Te Aroha region.

== Fiji ==
In the early 1920s Belcher moved to Fiji where he managed a shooting gallery in Suva. There his artistic talents were recognised by American ornithologist Casey Wood who took him on a bird collecting expedition on which he started illustrating the birds seen and collected. He was later employed by Rollo Beck on the Whitney South Seas Expedition. He travelled through the Fiji islands studying and painting the birds as well as the orchids.

Belcher married for a second time in 1938, to Rose Tapa’au Adams, a Samoan from Apia. He died in Fiji at the age of 66 and was buried in the Old Suva Cemetery. Most of his bird and orchid paintings were bought by the Fiji Museum.
