= Bechler Falls =

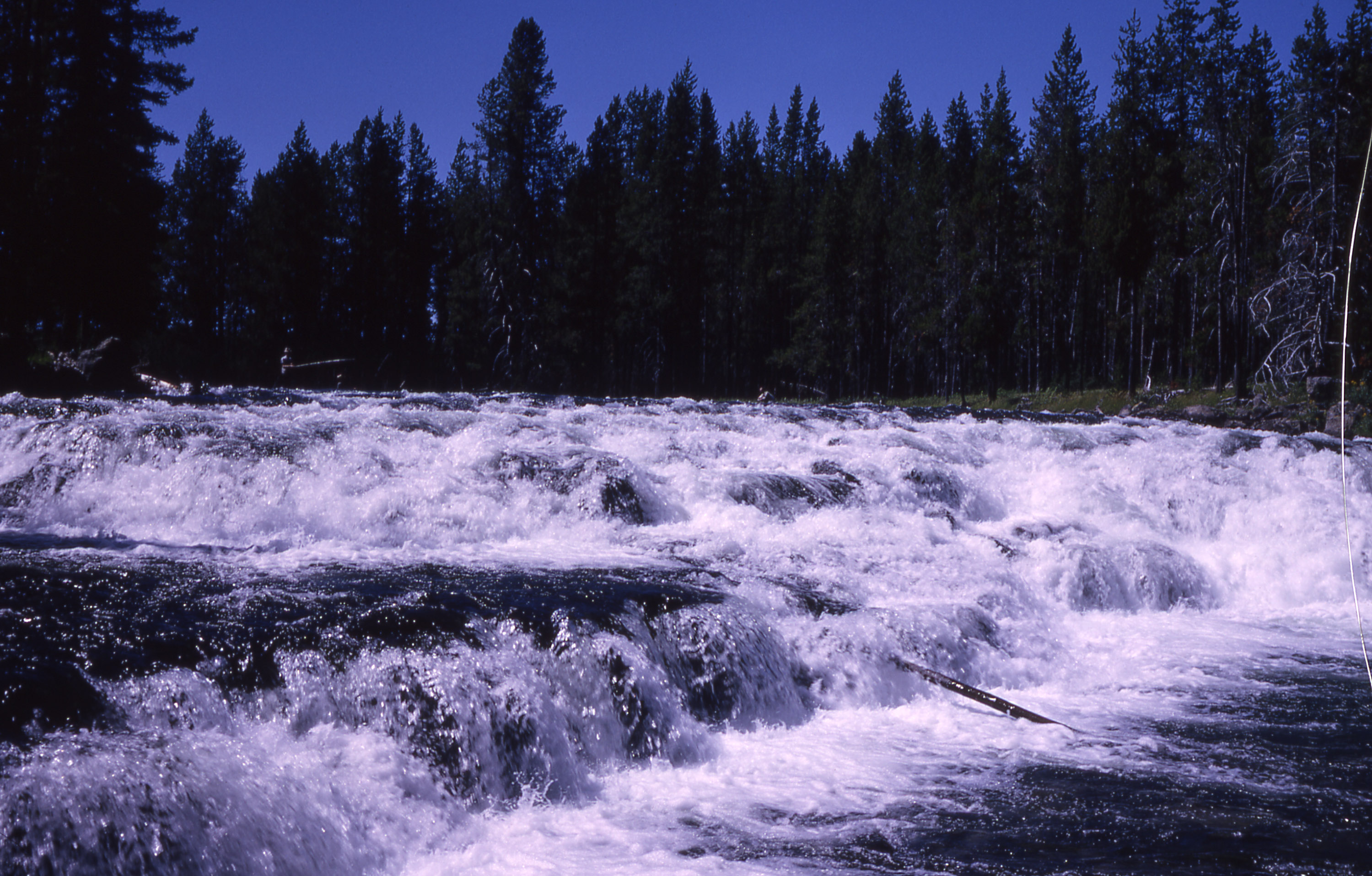
- 1964
- Interactive map of Bechler Falls
- Location: Yellowstone National Park, Teton County, Wyoming
- Coordinates: 44°08′57″N 111°00′36″W
- Type: Cascade, block
- Total height: 15 feet (4.6 m)
- Watercourse: Bechler River

Bechler Falls ht. 15 feet (4.6 m) is a waterfall on the Bechler River in Yellowstone National Park. Bechler Falls is the last waterfall on the Bechler River and is approximately 1 mile (1.6 km) from the confluence with the Fall River. It can be reached via the Bechler River trail approximately 3.5 miles (5.6 km) from the Cave Falls trailhead at the south boundary of the park. The falls were named in 1921 by explorers E. C. Gregg and C.H. Birdseye.

Images of Bechler Falls
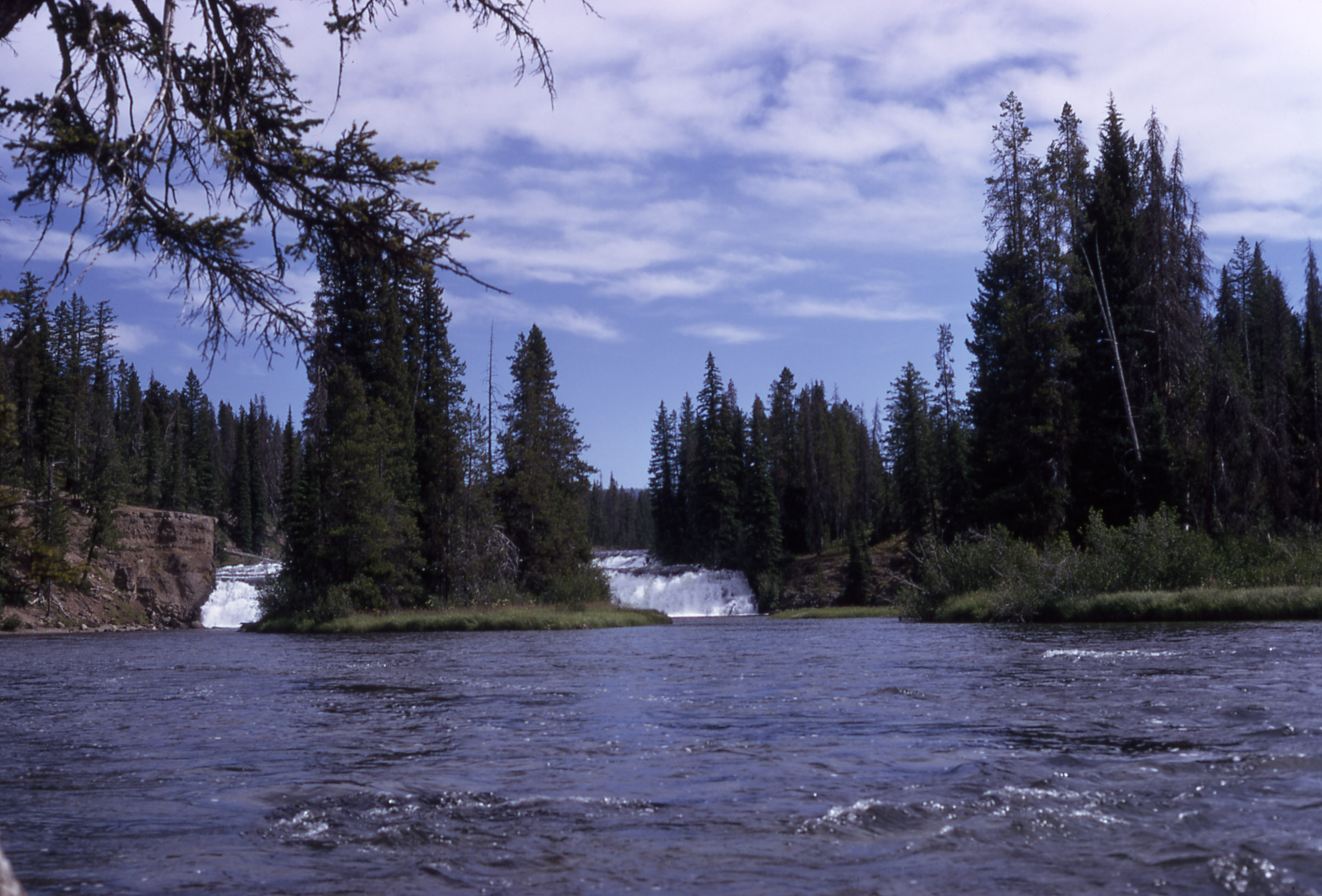
1974

== See also ==
- Waterfalls in Yellowstone National Park
