= Brian Belcher =

Canadian social scientist

Brian M. Belcher is a Canadian sustainability researcher at Royal Roads University and former Canada Research Chair in Sustainability Research Effectiveness.

Belcher holds a BSc in ecology from the University of Winnipeg, a Master of Natural Resources Management degree from the University of Manitoba, and a PhD (completed from 1992 to 1997) in forestry from the University of Minnesota. From 1989 to 1997, Belcher was employed at the International Development Research Centre; for the next decade, Belcher worked as a scientist at the Center for International Forestry Research in Bogor, Indonesia. He joined Royal Roads University in 2007.

In fall of 2013, Belcher was named Canada Research Chair in Sustainability Research Effectiveness, a Tier 1 chair funded by the Social Sciences and Humanities Research Council. He served a seven-year term in his chair, during which time he studied the effectiveness and impact of research in the social sciences. From October through December 2015, he was a fellow of the Institute of Advanced Study at Durham University. Belcher was appointed Ashoka Research Chair in 2019, receiving funding from Ashoka Canada to continue his research.

At Royal Roads University, Belcher is a professor in the College of Interdisciplinary Studies and directs the Sustainability Research Effectiveness program.
