= Clement Horton Belcher =

Canadian publisher (1801–1869)

Clement Horton Belcher (March 5, 1801 – May 23, 1869) was a bookseller and publisher from Halifax, Nova Scotia.

== Biography ==
Belcher was born in 1801 in Cornwallis, Nova Scotia. As a young man, he was apprenticed to the owner of a dry goods store. At age 21, Belcher assumed control of a bookstore that had belonged to a relative.

Belcher was notable for a number of his publications. The best known was The farmer's almanack, for the year of our Lord... which he began in 1824. In 1832 it was renamed Belcher's farmer's almanack. Another publication, Nova Scotia temperance almanack is attributed to him as well as other diverse works.

The Almanack and Belcher's name was known throughout the province. Well researched and widely distributed, the publication became part of most households and continued until 1930 under Belcher's name. At that time, publication ceased.

== See also ==
- Almanac
