= John Belcher (Methodist preacher) =

Welsh Methodist preacher

John Belcher (fl. 1721–1763) was a Welsh Methodist preacher. His father, Edmund Belcher, of Eglwys Ilan, was a local smith, and John himself initially joined him in the trade. By 1743 however he was working with the Watford Association. In 1744 he became an assistant of Howel Harris. He then was directed to tour North Wales. He enlisted in the army in 1758. His date of death is uncertain, but believed to be sometime after 1763.
