= John Winston Belcher =

American physicist

- Born: Louisiana, United States
- Education: Rice University (1965 SM); Caltech (1971 Ph.D.)
- Awards: NASA Exceptional Scientific Achievement Medal (1980 and 1990) and Hans Christian Oersted Medal (2016)
- Scientific career
- Fields: Professor, Physics at Massachusetts Institute of Technology
- Workplaces: Massachusetts Institute of Technology

John Winston Belcher (born 1943) is a professor of physics emeritus holding the "Class of '22" professorship at Massachusetts Institute of Technology. Professor Belcher's research interests are within the areas of space plasma physics. He was the principal investigator on the Voyager Plasma Science Experiment and is now a co-investigator on the Plasma Science Experiment on board the Voyager Interstellar Mission. Professor Belcher has twice received the NASA Exceptional Scientific Achievement Medal, and received the 2016 Oersted Medal for his exceptional work in revolutionizing the Undergraduate Physics department at MIT by introducing novel teaching formats such as TEAL. Belcher is actively involved in Mental Health initiatives at the institute and is an active MacVicar Faculty Fellow (2000–2006)

== Background ==
Belcher was born in Louisiana in 1943 and graduated from Odessa High School in 1961. Belcher later graduated at Rice University with a double major in mathematics and physics. He later went to the California Institute of Technology and received a Ph.D. in astrophysics. Shortly after which Belcher came to MIT and began work with the Space Plasma Group on the Voyager project.

== Work ==
- Postdoctoral fellow, Interplanetary Plasma Group, 1971
- Assistant professor, MIT Physics, 1971–1975
- Associate professor, MIT Physics, 1975–1982
- Professor, MIT Physics, 1982–present
- Class of '22 Professorship, 2004–present
- Associate chair of the MIT faculty, 2013–2014

== Honors and achievements ==
- 2016 Hans Christian Oersted Medal of the American Association of Physics Teachers
- 2008 APS Fellow
- 1990 NASA Exceptional Scientific Achievement Medal
- 1980 NASA Exceptional Scientific Achievement Medal
