= Charles Belcher (cricketer) =

English cricketer

Personal information
- Born: 15 December 1872; Berkeley, Gloucestershire, England
- Died: 1 April 1938 (aged 65); Caernarvon, Wales
- Batting: Right-handed

Domestic team information
- Years: Team
- 1890–1892: Gloucestershire
- Source: Cricinfo, 30 March 2014

Charles Belcher (15 December 1872 – 1 April 1938) was an English cricketer. He played for Gloucestershire between 1890 and 1892.
